= Mikkabi Station =

Railway station in Hamamatsu, Japan

Mikkabi Station 三ヶ日駅
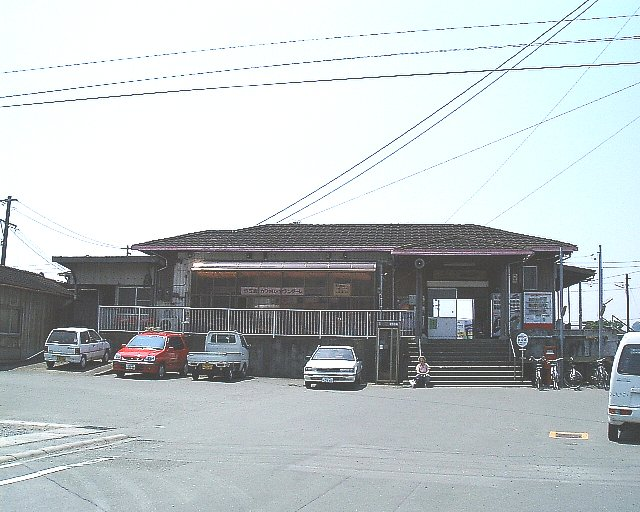
- Mikkabi Station in March 2006

General information
- Location: Mikkabi-cho, Mikkabi 1148-3, Hamana-ku, Hamamatsu-shi, Shizuoka-ken 431-1414; Japan
- Coordinates: 34°48′09″N 137°33′06″E
- Operator: Tenryū Hamanako Railroad
- Line: ■ Tenryū Hamanako Line
- Distance: 55.6 kilometers from Kakegawa
- Platforms: 1 side +1 island platforms

Other information
- Website: Official website

History
- Opened: May 6, 1936

Passengers
- FY2016: 218 daily
Location
- Location within Shizuoka Prefecture Location within Japan

Mikkabi Station (三ヶ日駅, Mikkabi-eki) is a railway station in Hamana-ku, Hamamatsu, Shizuoka Prefecture, Japan, operated by the third sector Tenryū Hamanako Railroad.

== Lines ==
Mikkabi Station is served by the Tenryū Hamanako Line, and is located 55.6 kilometers from the starting point of the line at Kakegawa Station.

== Station layout ==
The station has a side platform and an island platform connected to a wooden one-story station building by a level crossing. The station is staffed. The station building is protected as Registered Tangible Cultural Properties of Japan since 2011.

== Adjacent stations ==
«	Service	»
Tenryū Hamanako Railroad
Tenryū Hamanako Line
Tsuzuki	-	Okuhamanako

== Station History ==
Mikkabi Station was established on May 6, 1936 as the terminal station of the Japan National Railways Futamata-nishi Line, with the other terminal at Shinjohara Station. By April 1, 1938, the line was extended onwards to Kanasashi Station. Freight services were discontinued in 1970. On March 15, 1987, the station came under the control of the Tenryū Hamanako Line.

== Passenger statistics ==
In fiscal 2016, the station was used by an average of 218 passengers daily (boarding passengers only).

== Surrounding area ==
- former Mikkabi Town Hall
- Japan National Route 362

== See also ==
- List of railway stations in Japan
