= Tsuzuki Station =

Railway station in Hamamatsu, Japan

Tsuzuki Station 都筑駅
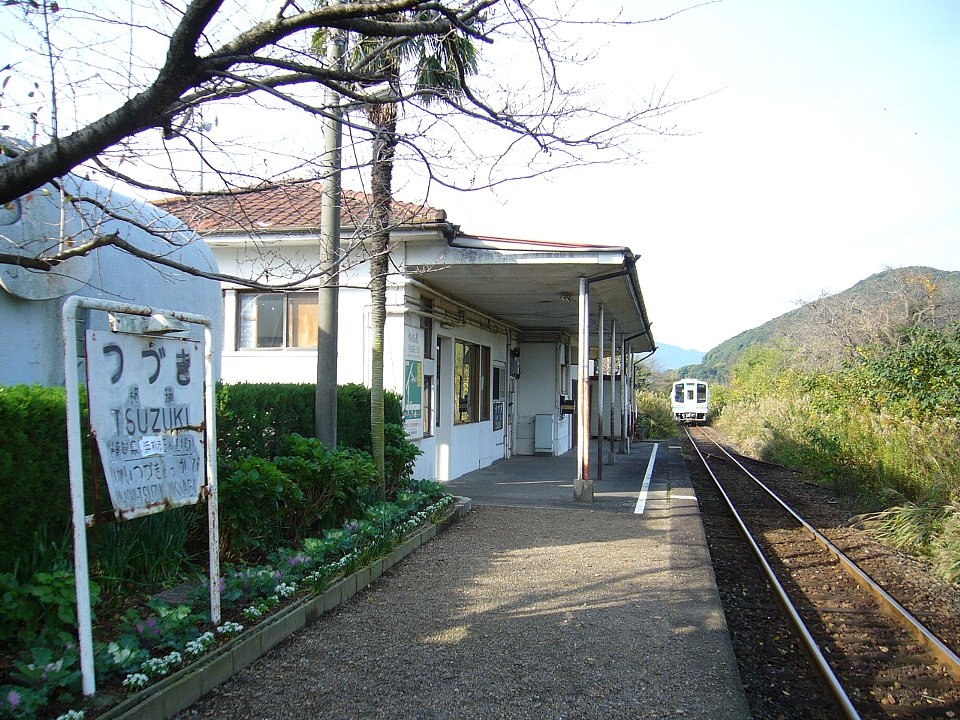
- Tsuzuki Station

General information
- Location: Mikkabi-cho, Tsuzuki 1789-3, Hamana-ku, Hamamatsu-shi, Shizuoka-ken 431-1402; Japan
- Coordinates: 34°47′45″N 137°34′28″E
- Operator: Tenryū Hamanako Railroad
- Line: ■ Tenryū Hamanako Line
- Distance: 53.3 kilometers from Kakegawa
- Platforms: 1 side platform

Other information
- Website: Official website

History
- Opened: April 1, 1938

Passengers
- FY2016: 39 daily
Location
- Location within Shizuoka Prefecture Location within Japan

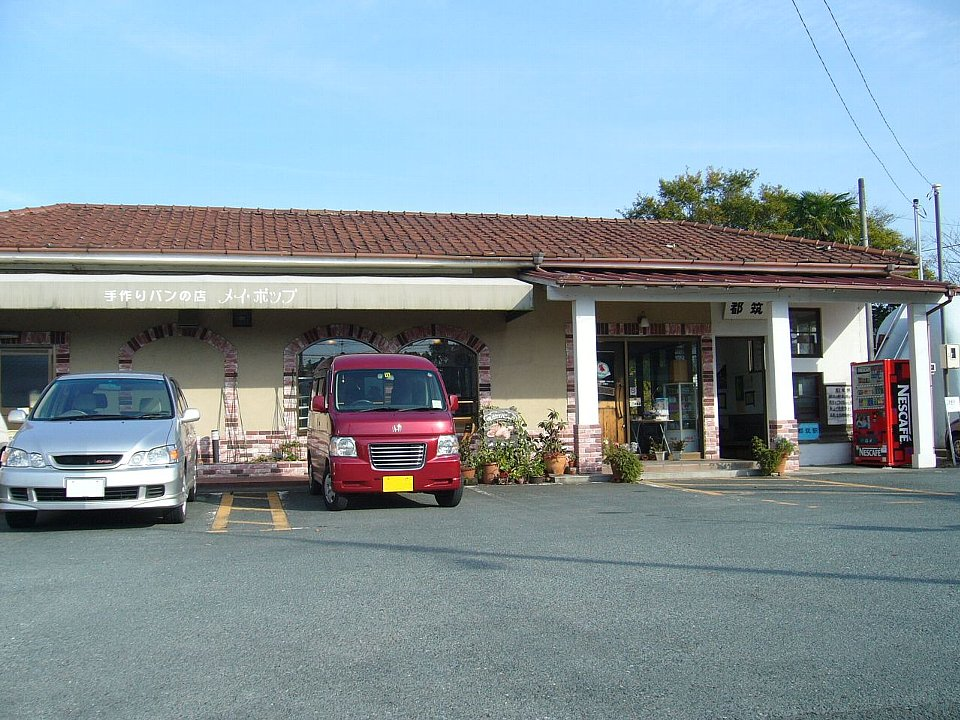
Station building

Tsuzuki Station (都筑駅, Tsuzuki-eki) is a railway station in Hamana-ku, Hamamatsu, Shizuoka Prefecture, Japan, operated by the third sector Tenryū Hamanako Railroad.

== Lines ==
Tsuzuki Station is served by the Tenryū Hamanako Line, and is located 53.3 kilometers from the starting point of the line at Kakegawa Station.

== Station layout ==
The station has a single side platform and a single-story station building which also serves as the local bakery.

== Adjacent stations ==
«	Service	»
Tenryū Hamanako Railroad
Tenryū Hamanako Line
Higashi-Tsuzuki	-	Mikkabi

== Station history ==
Tsuzuki Station was established on April 1, 1938 as a station of the Japan National Railways Futamata Line with the completion of the Kanasashi-Mikkabi extension. Freight services were discontinued from 1962, and small parcel services from 1970, after which time the station was no longer staffed. On March 15, 1987, the station came under the control of the Tenryū Hamanako Line.

== Passenger statistics ==
In fiscal 2016, the station was used by an average of 39 passengers daily (boarding passengers only).

== Surrounding area ==
- Lake Hamana
- Tōmei Expressway

== See also ==
- List of railway stations in Japan
