= Shikiji Station =

Railway station in Iwata, Shizuoka Prefecture, Japan

Shikiji Station 敷地駅
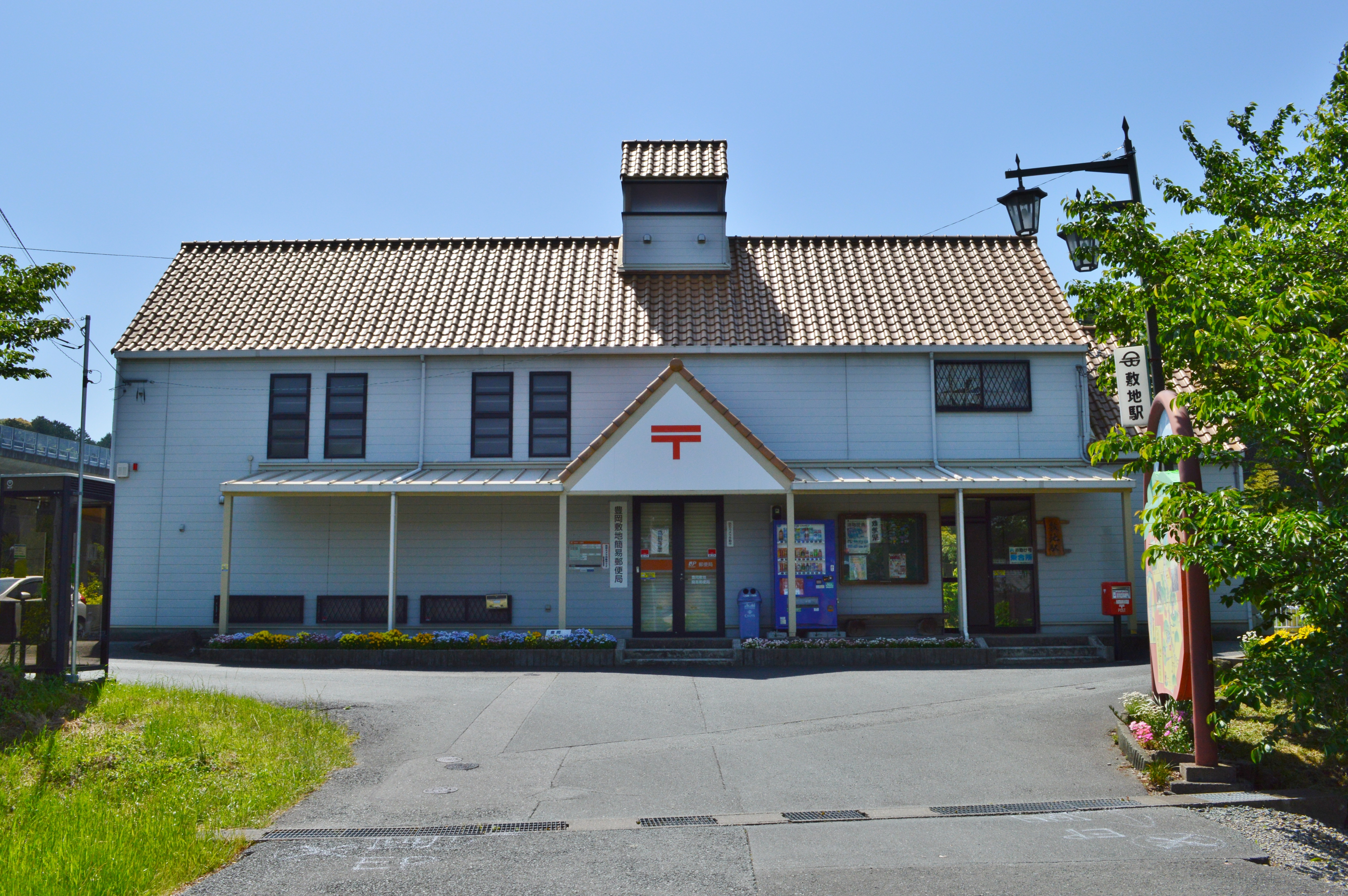
- Shikiji Stationing April 2018

General information
- Location: 404-2 Shikiji, Iwata-shi, Shizuoka-ken 438-0106; Japan
- Coordinates: 34°49′34.47″N 137°51′51.54″E
- Operator: Tenryū Hamanako Railroad
- Line: ■ Tenryū Hamanako Line
- Distance: 18.9 kilometers from Kakegawa
- Platforms: 1 side platform

Other information
- Status: Unstaffed
- Website: Official website

History
- Opened: June 1, 1940

Passengers
- FY2016: 59 daily
Location
- Location within Shizuoka Prefecture Location within Japan

Shikiji Station (敷地駅, Shikiji-eki) is a railway station in the city of Iwata, Shizuoka Prefecture, Japan, operated by the third sector Tenryū Hamanako Railroad.

== Lines ==
Shikijii Station is served by the Tenryū Hamanako Line, and is located 18.9 kilometers from the starting point of the line at Kakegawa Station.

== Station layout ==
The station has one side platform serving a single bi-directional track. The wooden station building is unattended, but also serves as the local post office.

== Station history ==
Shikiji Station was established on June 1, 1940 when the section of the Japan National Railways Futamata Line was extended from Enshū-Mori Station to Kanasashi Station. On March 15, 1987, the station came under the control of the Tenryū Hamanako Line.

== Passenger statistics ==
In fiscal 2016, the station was used by an average of 59 passengers daily (boarding passengers only).

== Surrounding area ==
- Yamaha Motor Company Toyooka factory

== Adjacent stations ==
«	Service	»
Tenryū Hamanako Railroad
Tenryū Hamanako Line
Tōtōmi-Ichinomiya	-	Toyooka

== See also ==
- List of railway stations in Japan
