= Tōtōmi-Ichinomiya Station =

Railway station in Mori, Shizuoka Prefecture, Japan

Tōtōmi-Ichinomiya Station 遠江一宮駅
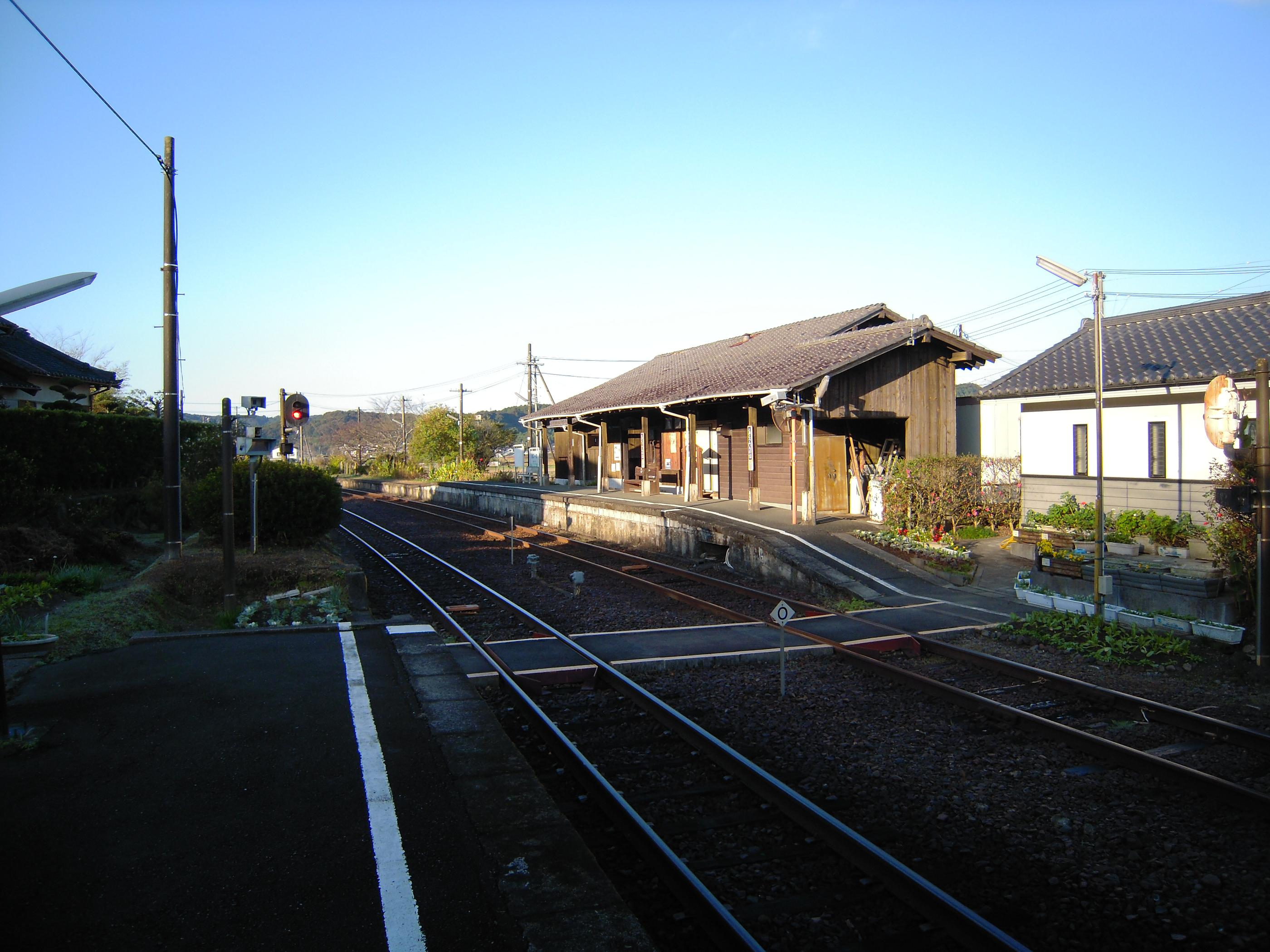
- Tōtōmi-Ichinomiya Station

General information
- Location: Ichinomiya 2431-2, Mori-machi, Shūchi-gun, Shizuoka-ken 437-0226; Japan
- Coordinates: 34°49′5.02″N 137°53′19.74″E
- Operator: Tenryū Hamanako Railroad
- Line: ■ Tenryū Hamanako Line
- Distance: 16.4 kilometers from Kakegawa
- Platforms: 2 side platforms

Other information
- Status: Staffed
- Website: Official website

History
- Opened: June 1, 1940

Passengers
- FY2016: 54 daily
Location
- Location within Shizuoka Prefecture Location within Japan

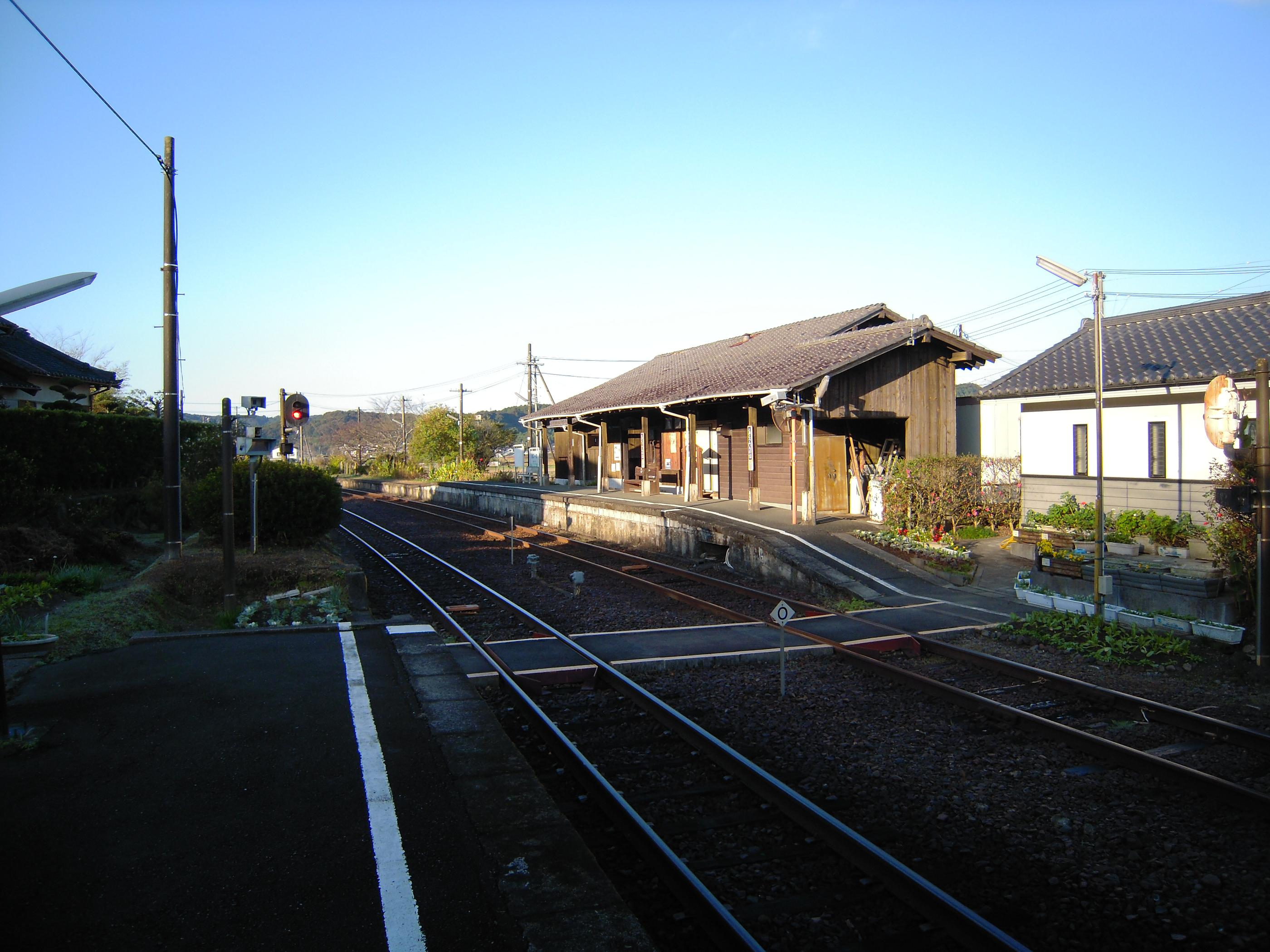
Tōtōmi-Ichinomiya Station

Tōtōmi-Ichinomiya Station (遠江一宮駅, Tōtōmi-Ichinomiya-eki) is a railway station in the town of Mori, Shizuoka Prefecture, Japan, operated by the third sector Tenryū Hamanako Railroad.

== Lines ==
Tōtōmi-Ichinomiya Station is served by the Tenryū Hamanako Line, and is located 16.4 kilometers from the starting point of the line at Kakegawa Station.

== Station layout ==
The station has two opposing side platforms, connected to an old wooden station building by a level crossing. The station is staffed. The station building, which was built in 1940, was designated a Registered Tangible Cultural Property in 2011.

== Adjacent stations ==
«	Service	»
Tenryū Hamanako Line
Enden	-	Shikiji

== History ==
Tōtōmi-Ichinomiya Station opened on June 1, 1940, when the section of the Japanese National Railways (JNR) Futamata Line was extended from Enshū-Mori Station to Kanasashi Station.. After the privatization of JNR on March 15, 1987, the station came under the control of the Tenryū Hamanako Line.

== Passenger statistics ==
In fiscal 2016, the station was used by an average of 54 passengers daily (boarding passengers only).

== Surrounding area ==
- Oguni Jinja

== See also ==
- List of railway stations in Japan
