= Toyooka Station (Shizuoka) =

Railway station in Iwata, Shizuoka Prefecture, Japan

Toyooka Station 豊岡駅
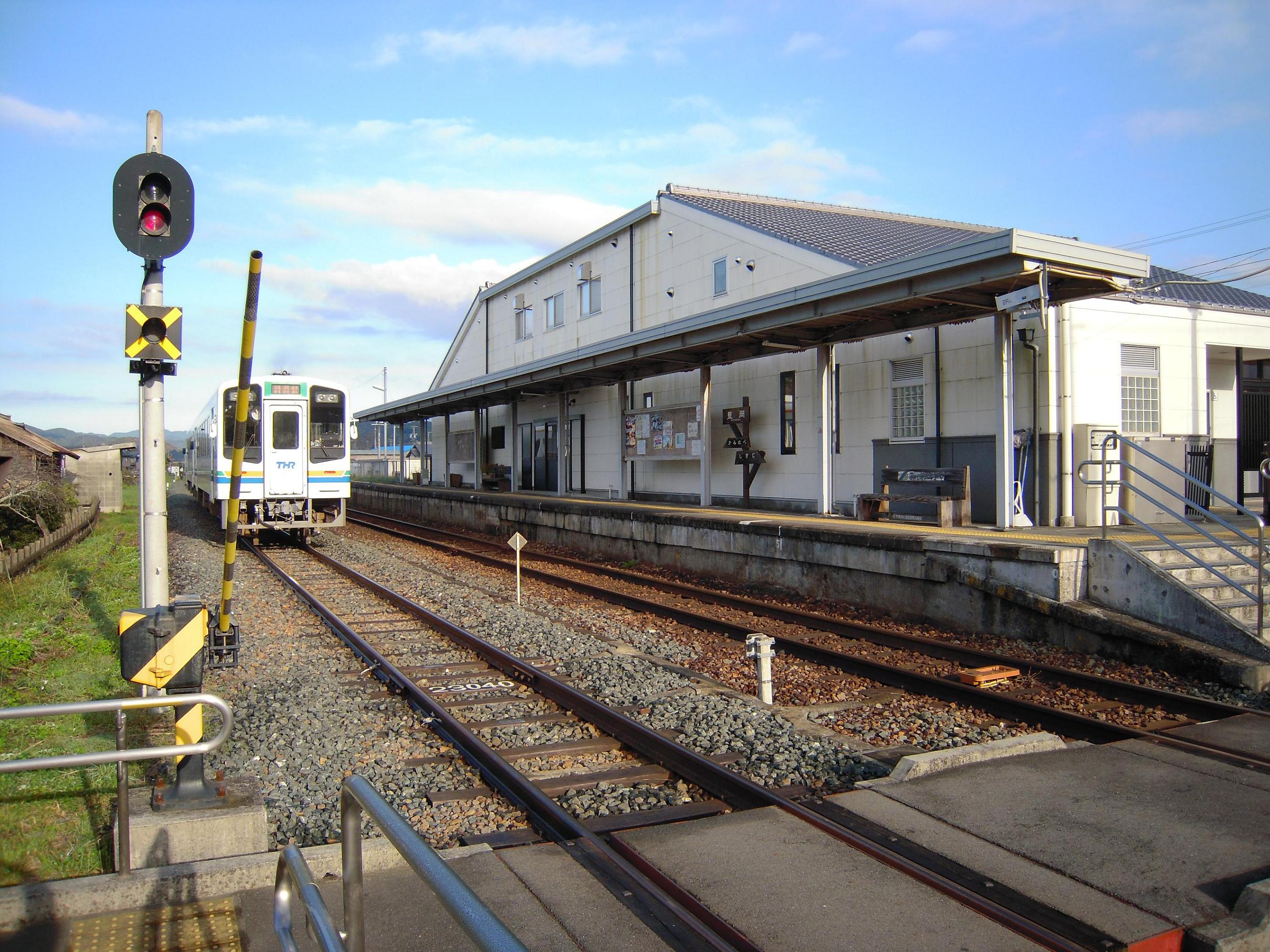
- Toyooka Station in November 2009

General information
- Location: 114-1 Shinkai, Iwata-shi, Shizuoka-ken 438-0113; Japan
- Coordinates: 34°50′14.25″N 137°50′23.31″E
- Operator: Tenryū Hamanako Railroad
- Line: ■ Tenryū Hamanako Line
- Distance: 23.0 kilometers from Kakegawa
- Platforms: 2 side platforms

Other information
- Status: Unstaffed
- Website: Official website

History
- Opened: June 1, 1940
- Former names: Nobe (to 1987)

Passengers
- FY2016: 77 daily
Location
- Location within Shizuoka Prefecture Location within Japan

Toyooka Station (豊岡駅, Toyooka-eki) is a railway station in the city of Iwata, Shizuoka Prefecture, Japan, operated by the third sector Tenryū Hamanako Railroad.

== Lines ==
Toyooka Station is served by the Tenryū Hamanako Line, and is located 23.0 kilometers from the starting point of the line at Kakegawa Station.

== Station layout ==
The station has two opposed side platforms connected by a level crossing. The wooden station building is unattended.

== Adjacent stations ==
«	Service	»
Tenryū Hamanako Railroad
Tenryū Hamanako Line
Shikiji	-	Kaminobe

== Station history ==
Toyooka Station was established on June 1, 1940, in former Toyora village as Nobe Station (野部駅, Nobe-eki), when the section of the Japan National Railways Futamata Line was extended from Enshū-Mori Station to Kanasashi Station. Scheduled freight services were discontinued from February 1964. On March 15, 1987, the station came under the control of the Tenryū Hamanako Line and was renamed to its present name. The station was rebuilt in 2003 through the efforts of the local Chamber of Commerce, and an additional platform was added at that time.

== Passenger statistics ==
In fiscal 2016, the station was used by an average of 77 passengers daily (boarding passengers only).

== Surrounding area ==
- Toyooka Kita Elementary School

== See also ==
- List of railway stations in Japan
