= Tokohadaigakumae Station =

Railway station in Hamamatsu, Japan

Tokohadaigakumae Station 常葉大学前駅
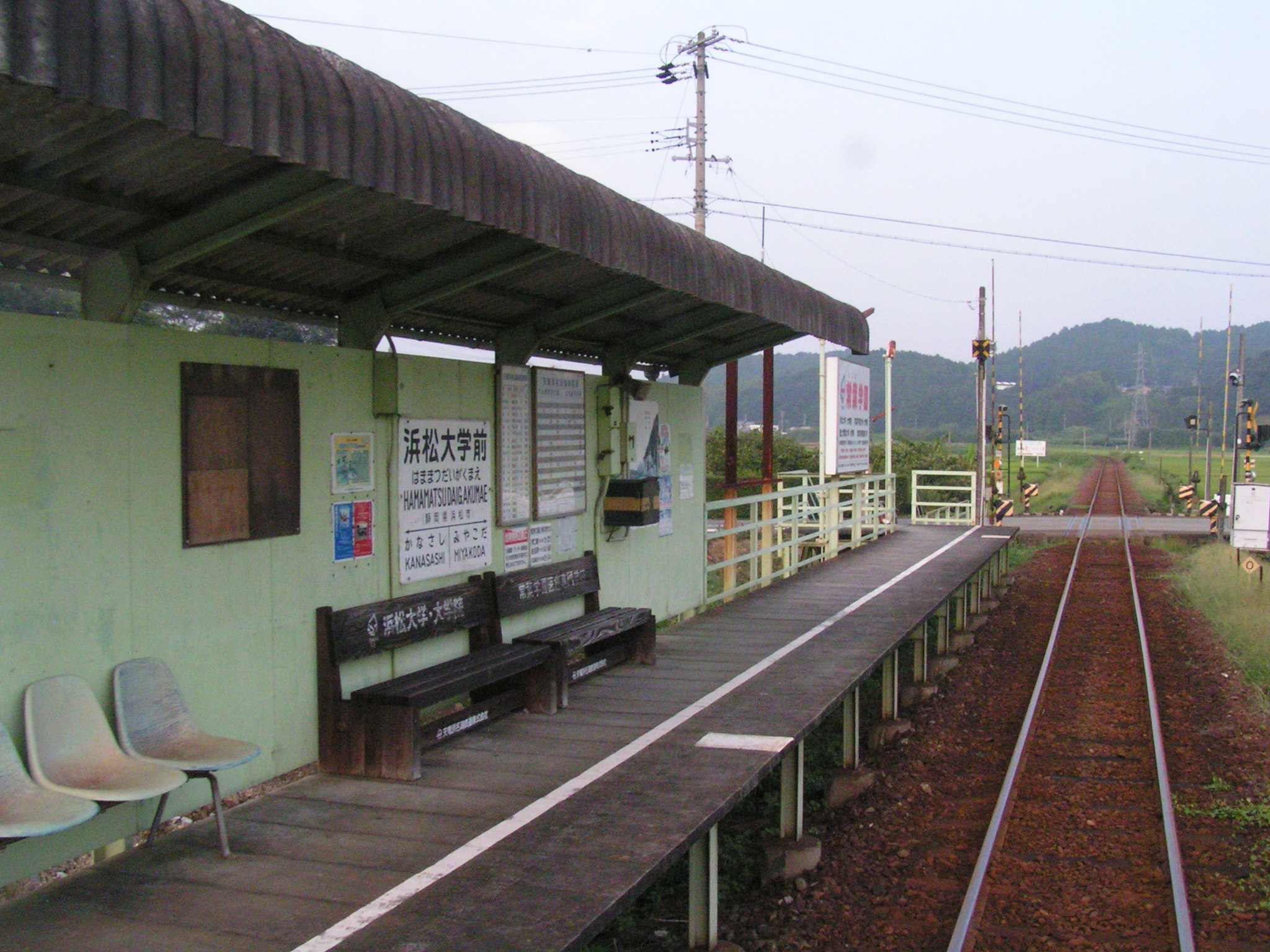
- Hamamatsudaigakumae Station in August 2006

General information
- Location: Miyakoda, Hamana, Hamamatsu, Shizuoka （静岡県 浜松市浜名区都田町字吉影） Japan
- Coordinates: 34°49′12″N 137°42′34″E
- Operator: Tenryū Hamanako Railroad
- Line: ■ Tenryū Hamanako Line
- Distance: 39.1 kilometers from Kakegawa
- Platforms: 1 side platform

Other information
- Status: Unstaffed
- Website: Official website

History
- Opened: March 13, 1988
- Former names: Hamamatsudaigakumae (to 2013)

Passengers
- FY2016: 22 daily
Location
- Location within Shizuoka Prefecture Location within Japan

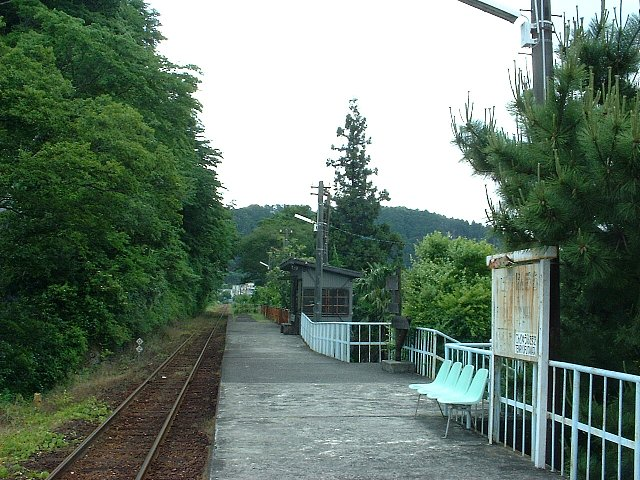
Platform

Tokohadaigakumae Station (常葉大学前駅, Tokohadaigakumae-eki) is a railway station in Hamana-ku, Hamamatsu, Shizuoka Prefecture, Japan, operated by the third sector Tenryū Hamanako Railroad.

== Lines ==
Tokohadaigakumae Station is served by the Tenryū Hamanako Line, and is located 39.1 kilometers from the starting point of the line at Kakegawa Station.

== Station layout ==
The station has a single side platform serving one bi-directional track. The station is unattended.

== Adjacent stations ==
«	Service	»
Tenryū Hamanako Railroad
Tenryū Hamanako Line
Miyakoda	-	Kanasashi

== Station history ==
Tokohadaigakumae Station was established on March 13, 1988, as Hamamatsudaigakumae Station (浜松大学前駅) part of the expansion of services by the Tenryū Hamanako Line after the privatization of Japan National Railways in 1987. It is located to service Hamamatsu University which is within sight of the station. The station was renamed to its present name on April 1, 2013, when the university was renamed.

== Passenger statistics ==
In fiscal 2016, the station was used by an average of 22 passengers daily (boarding passengers only).

== Surrounding area ==
- Tokoha University

== See also ==
- List of railway stations in Japan
