= Okuhamanako Station =

Railway station in Hamamatsu, Japan

Okuhamanako Station 奥浜名湖駅
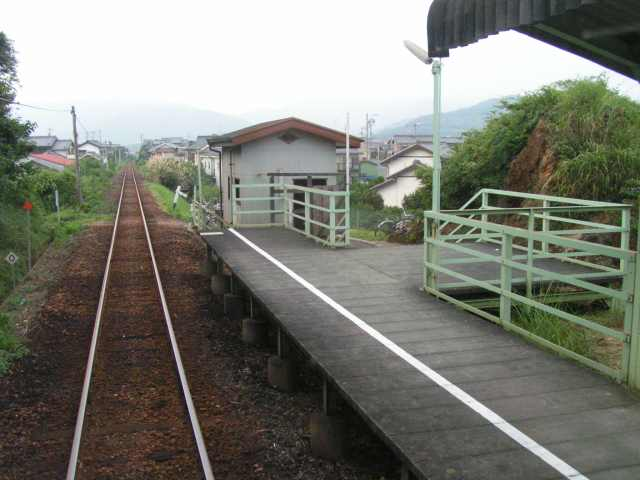
- Okuhamanako Station in August 2006

General information
- Location: Mikkabi-cho, Shimo-ona 1-10, Hamana-ku, Hamamatsu-shi, Shizuoka-ken 431-1424; Japan
- Coordinates: 34°47′42.4″N 137°32′45.4″E
- Operator: Tenryū Hamanako Railroad
- Line: ■ Tenryū Hamanako Line
- Distance: 56.8 kilometers from Kakegawa
- Platforms: 1 side platform

Other information
- Website: Official website

History
- Opened: March 13, 1988

Passengers
- FY2016: 26 daily
Location
- Location within Shizuoka Prefecture Location within Japan

Okuhamanako Station (奥浜名湖駅, Okuhamanako-eki) is a railway station in Hamana-ku, Hamamatsu, Shizuoka Prefecture, Japan, operated by the third sector Tenryū Hamanako Railroad.

== Lines ==
Okuhamanako Station is served by the Tenryū Hamanako Line, and is located 56.8 kilometers from the starting point of the line at Kakegawa Station.

== Station layout ==
The station has a single side platform. The station is unattended.

== Adjacent stations ==
«	Service	»
Tenryū Hamanako Railroad
Tenryū Hamanako Line
Mikkabi	-	Ona

== Station history ==
Okuhamanako Station was established on March 13, 1988 as part of the expansion of services on the Tenryū Hamanako Line after the privatization of JNR in 1987.

== Passenger statistics ==
In fiscal 2016, the station was used by an average of 26 passengers daily (boarding passengers only).

== Surrounding area ==
- Lake Hamana
- Japan National Route 362

== See also ==
- List of railway stations in Japan
