= Higashi-Tsuzuki Station =

Railway station in Hamamatsu, Japan

Higashi-Tsuzuki Station 東都筑駅
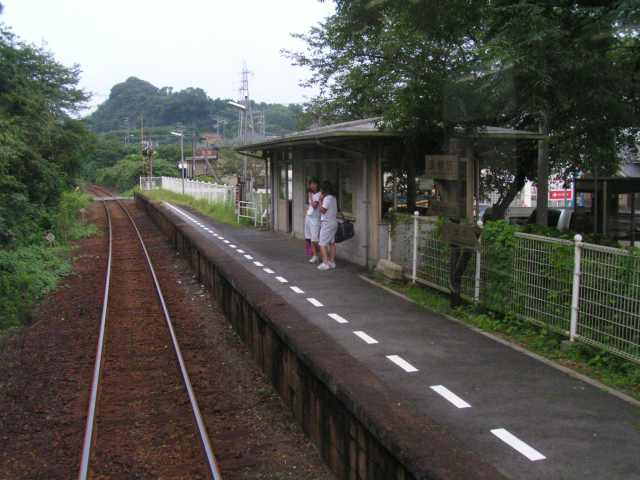
- Higashi-Tsuzuki Station in August 2006

General information
- Location: Mikkabi-cho, Tsuzuki 1089-4, Hamana-ku, Hamamatsu-shi, Shizuoka-ken 431-1402; Japan
- Coordinates: 34°47′25″N 137°35′12″E
- Operator: Tenryū Hamanako Railroad
- Line: ■ Tenryū Hamanako Line
- Distance: 51.9 kilometers from Kakegawa
- Platforms: 1 side platform

Other information
- Website: Official website

History
- Opened: July 8, 1953

Passengers
- FY2016: 39 daily
Location
- Location within Shizuoka Prefecture Location within Japan

Higashi-Tsuzuki Station (東都筑駅, Higashi-Tsuzuki-eki) is a railway station in Hamana-ku, Hamamatsu, Shizuoka Prefecture, Japan, operated by the third sector Tenryū Hamanako Railroad.

== Lines ==
Higashi-Tsuzuki Station is served by the Tenryū Hamanako Line, and is located 51.9 kilometers from the starting point of the line at Kakegawa Station.

== Station layout ==
The station has a single side platform, with a small weather shelter built adjacent to the platform. The station is unattended.

== Adjacent stations ==
«	Service	»
Tenryū Hamanako Railroad
Tenryū Hamanako Line
Hamanako-Sakume	-	Tsuzuki

== Station history ==
Higashi-Tsuzuki Station was established on July 8, 1953, as a station of the Japan National Railways Futamata Line. On March 15, 1987, the station came under the control of the Tenryū Hamanako Line.

== Passenger statistics ==
In fiscal 2016, the station was used by an average of 39 passengers daily (boarding passengers only).

== Surrounding area ==
- Lake Hamana
- Tōmei Expressway

== See also ==
- List of railway stations in Japan
