= Ona Station =

Railway station in Hamamatsu, Japan

Ona Station 尾奈駅
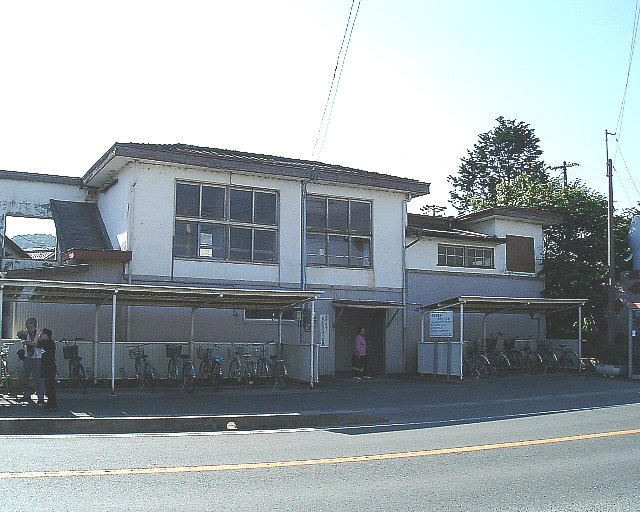
- Ona Station in December 2009

General information
- Location: Mikkabi-cho, Shimo-Ona 1170-4, Hamana-ku, Hamamatsu-shi, Shizuoka-ken 431-1424; Japan
- Coordinates: 34°47′02″N 137°32′30″E
- Operator: Tenryū Hamanako Railroad
- Line: ■ Tenryū Hamanako Line
- Distance: 58.1 kilometers from Kakegawa
- Platforms: 1 side platform

Other information
- Website: Official website

History
- Opened: December 1, 1936

Passengers
- FY2016: 56 daily
Location
- Location within Shizuoka Prefecture Location within Japan

Ona Station (尾奈駅, Ona-eki) is a railway station in Hamana-ku, Hamamatsu, Shizuoka Prefecture, Japan, operated by the third sector Tenryū Hamanako Railroad.

== Lines ==
Ona Station is served by the Tenryū Hamanako Line, and is located 58.1 kilometers from the starting point of the line at Kakegawa Station.

== Station history ==
Ona Station was established on December 1, 1936 as a station of the Japan National Railways Futamata Line. Scheduled freight services were discontinued from August 1962. On March 15, 1987, the station came under the control of the Tenryū Hamanako Line.

== Passenger statistics ==
In fiscal 2016, the station was used by an average of 56 passengers daily (boarding passengers only).

== Station layout ==
The station has a single side platform with a two-story station building. The station is unattended.

== Adjacent stations ==
«	Service	»
Tenryū Hamanako Railroad
Tenryū Hamanako Line
Okuhamanako	-	Chibata

== Surrounding area ==
- Japan National Route 301

== See also ==
- List of railway stations in Japan
