= Tenryū-Futamata Station =

Railway station in Hamamatsu, Japan

Tenryū-Futamata Station 天竜二俣駅
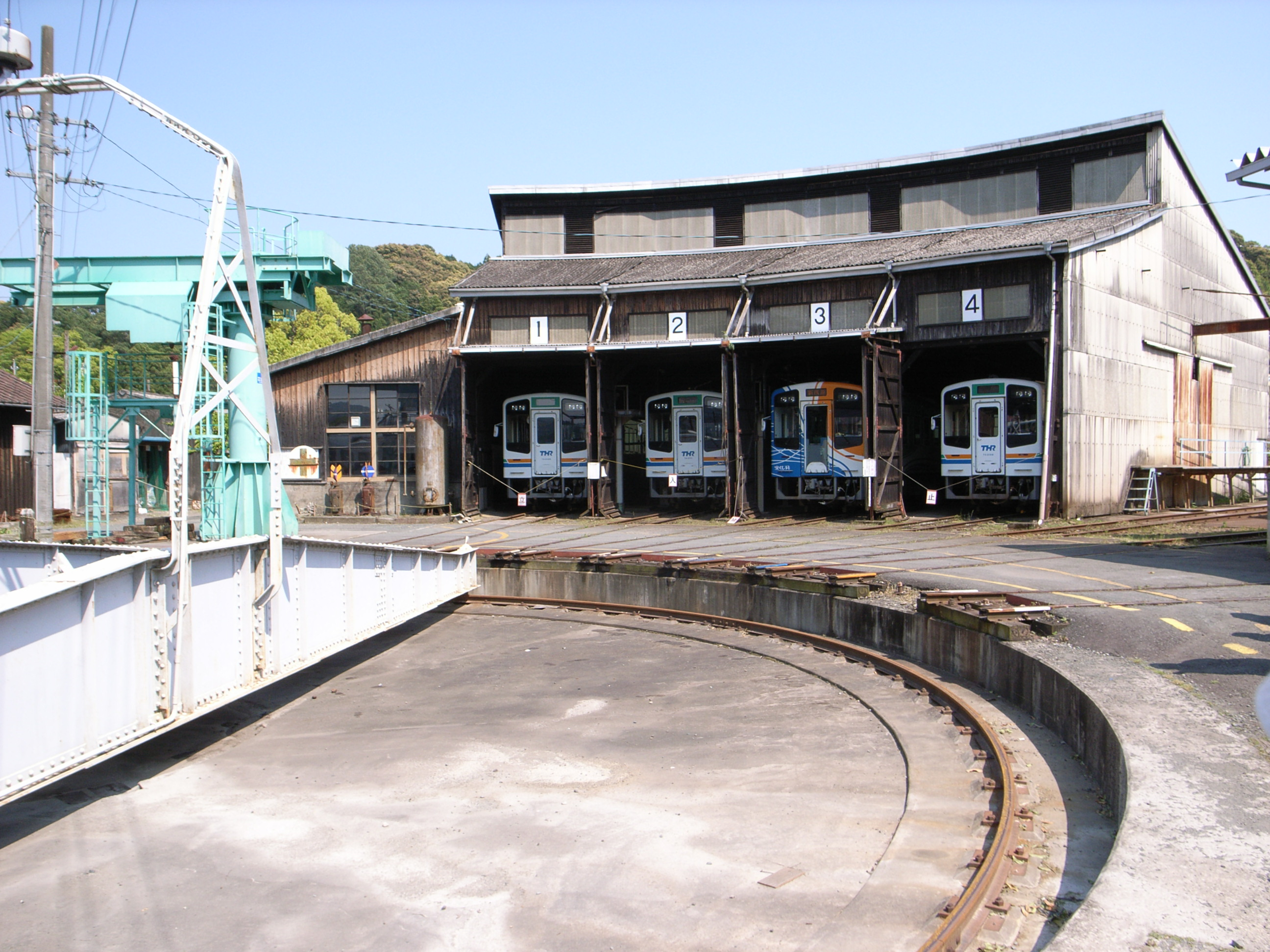
- Tenryū-Futamata Tenryū-Futamata Turntable and Roundhouse in 2005

General information
- Location: Futamata-cho, Akura, Tenryū-ku, Hamamatsu-shi, Shizuoka-ken 431-3311; Japan
- Coordinates: 34°51′34.08″N 137°49′11.16″E
- Operator: Tenryū Hamanako Railroad
- Line: ■ Tenryū Hamanako Line
- Distance: 26.2 kilometers from Kakegawa
- Platforms: 1 side + 1 island platform

Other information
- Status: Staffed
- Website: Official website

History
- Opened: June 1, 1940

Passengers
- FY2016: 256 daily
Location
- Location within Shizuoka Prefecture Location within Japan

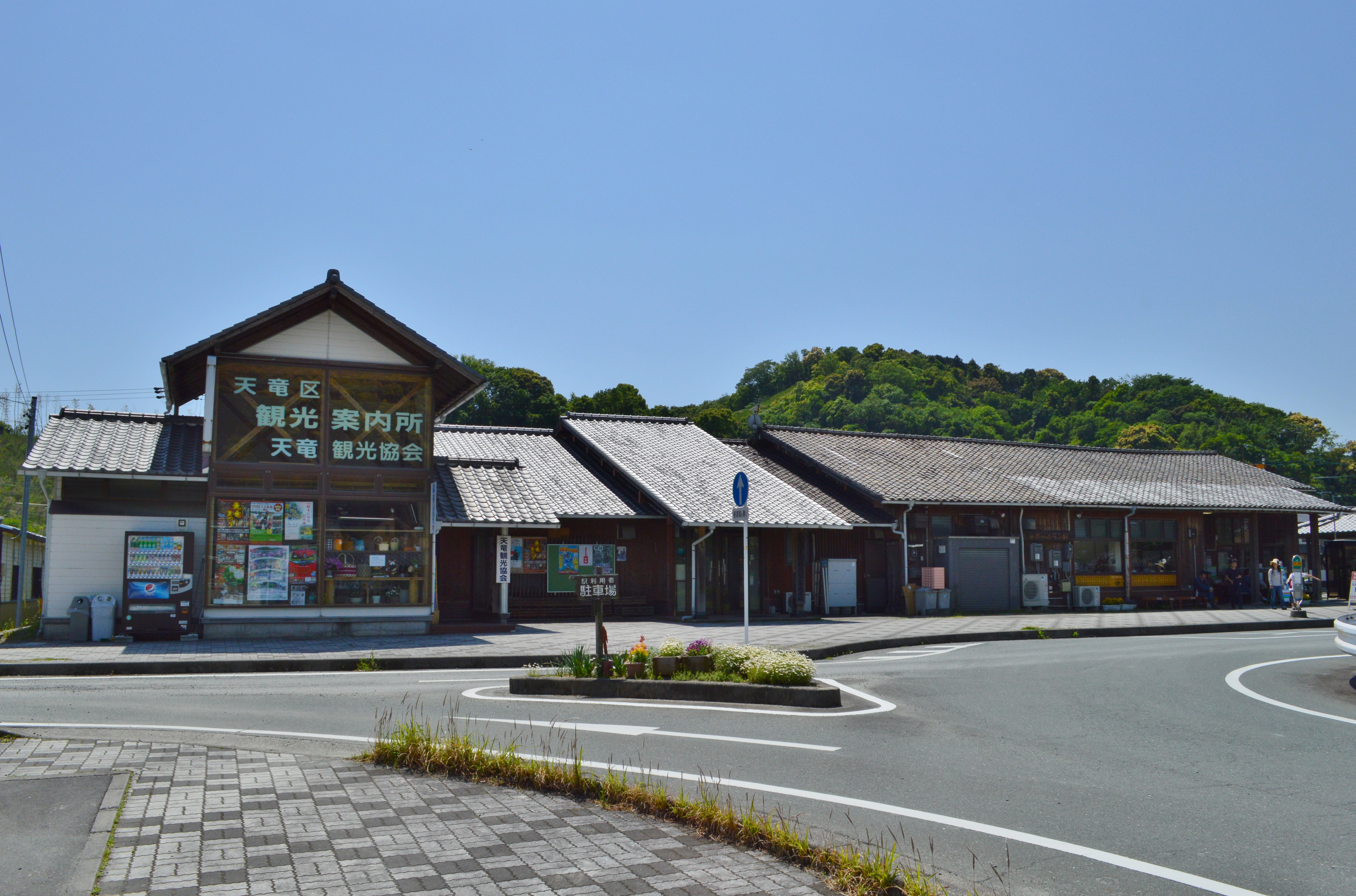
Tenryū-Futamata Station building in April 2008

Tenryū-Futamata Station (天竜二俣駅, Tenryū-Futamata-eki) is a railway station in Tenryū-ku, Hamamatsu, Shizuoka Prefecture, Japan, operated by the third sector Tenryū Hamanako Railroad.

== Lines ==
Tenryū-Futamata Station is served by the Tenryū Hamanako Line, and is located 26.2 kilometers from the starting point of the line at Kakegawa Station.

== Station layout ==
The station has one side platform and one island platform serving three tracks. The station is staffed. The rail yard for the Tenryū Hamanako Line is located next to this station, and retains the roundhouse and turntable from the days the line used steam locomotives. Both are listed by that national government as Registered Tangible Cultural Properties under the category of “Heritage of Industrial Modernization”.

== Adjacent stations ==
«	Service	»
Tenryū Hamanako Railroad
Tenryū Hamanako Line
Kaminobe	-	Futamata-Hommachi

== Station History ==
Tenryū-Futamata Station was established on April 1, 1940 when the section of the Japan National Railways Futamata Line was extended from Enshū-Mori Station to Kanasashi Station. Scheduled freight services were discontinued from 1982. On March 15, 1987, the station came under the control of the Tenryū Hamanako Line.

== Passenger statistics ==
In fiscal 2016, the station was used by an average of 256 passengers daily (boarding passengers only).

== Surrounding area ==
- Locomotive Park
- Hamamatsu City Tenryu Public Library

== See also ==
- List of railway stations in Japan
