= Okaji Station =

Railway station in Hamamatsu, Japan

Okaji Station 岡地駅
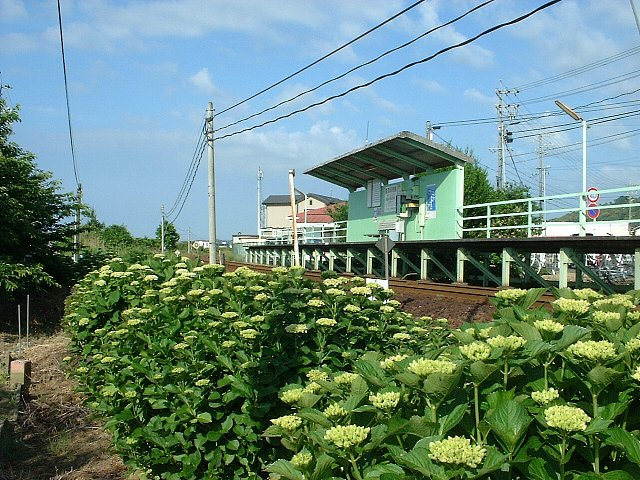
- Okaji Station (then called Kigakōkōmae Station) in March 2006

General information
- Location: Hosoe-chō Nakagawa 4672-3, Hamana-ku, Hamamatsu-shi, Shizuoka-ken 431-1304; Japan
- Coordinates: 34°48′44″N 137°39′56″E
- Operator: Tenryū Hamanako Railroad
- Line: ■ Tenryū Hamanako Line
- Distance: 43.5 kilometers from Kakegawa
- Platforms: 1 side platform

Other information
- Status: Unstaffed
- Website: Official website

History
- Opened: March 15, 1987
- Former names: Kigakōkōmae (until 2015)

Passengers
- FY2017: 24 daily
Location
- Location within Shizuoka Prefecture Location within Japan

Okaji Station (岡地駅, Okaji-eki) is a railway station in Hamana-ku, Hamamatsu, Shizuoka Prefecture, Japan, operated by the third sector Tenryū Hamanako Railroad.

== Lines ==
Okaji Station is served by the Tenryū Hamanako Line, and is located 43.5 kilometers from the starting point of the line at Kakegawa Station.

== Station layout ==
The station has single side platform and no station building. It is unattended.

== Adjacent stations ==
«	Service	»
Tenryū Hamanako Railroad
Tenryū Hamanako Line
Kanasashi	-	Kiga

== Station history ==
The station, originally called Kigakōkōmae Station (気賀高校前駅, Kigakōkōmae-eki), was established on March 15, 1987, the date the former Futamata Line of the Japanese National Railways was succeeded by the Tenryū Hamanako Railroad as its Tenryū Hamanako Line. The station was used by students of nearby Kiga High School, from which the station took the name.

The station name was changed to the present one on March 14, 2015, concurrently with the opening of Morimachibyōin-mae Station.

== Passenger statistics ==
In fiscal 2016, the station was used by an average of 24 passengers daily (boarding passengers only).

== Surrounding area ==
- Japan National Route 362

== See also ==
- List of railway stations in Japan
