= Kaminobe Station =

Railway station in Iwata, Shizuoka Prefecture, Japan

Kaminobe Station 上野部駅
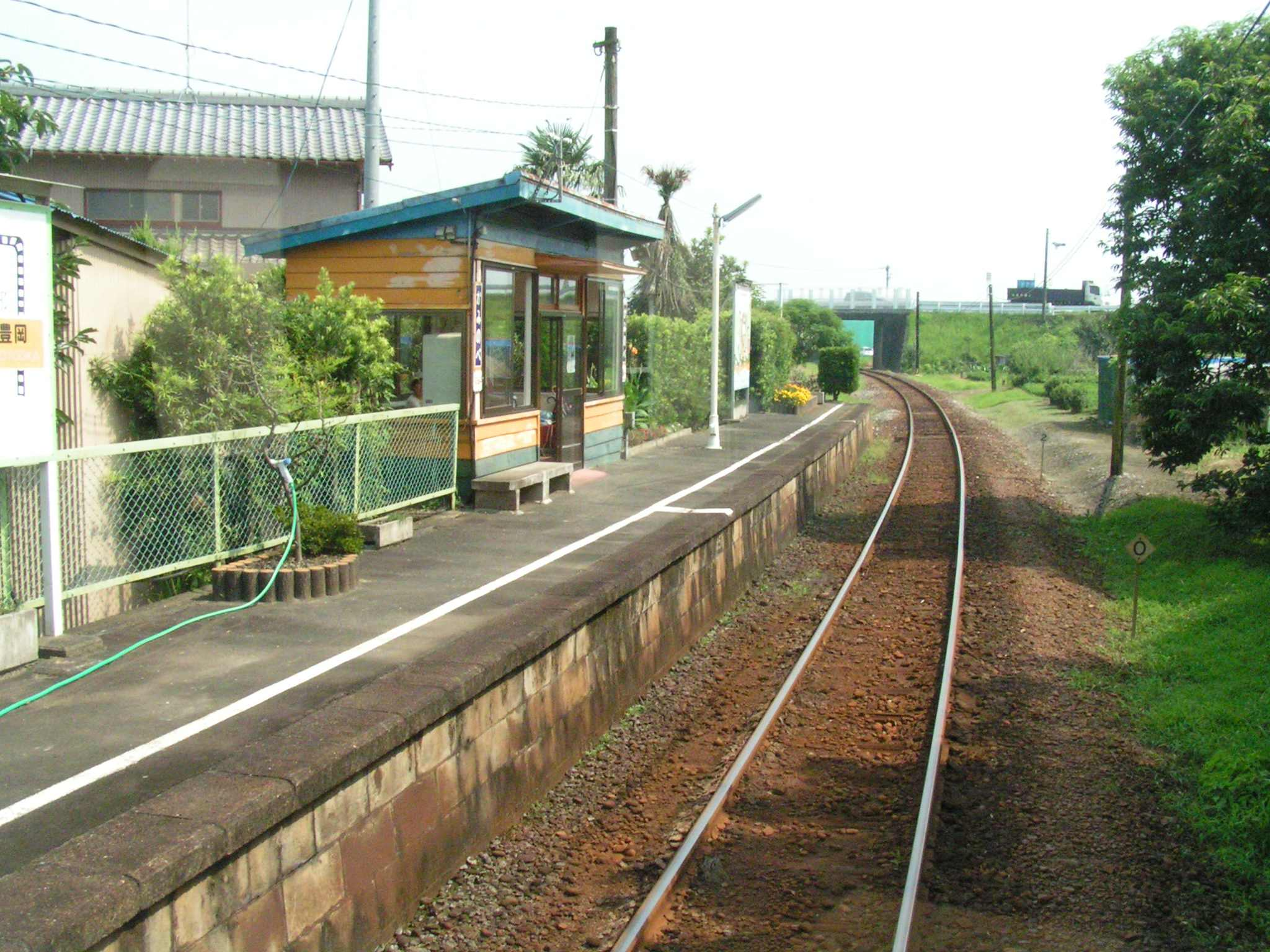
- Kaminobe Stationing August 2006

General information
- Location: 2704-2 Kaminobe, Iwata-shi, Shizuoka-ken 438-0111; Japan
- Coordinates: 34°50′50.89″N 137°49′48.06″E
- Operator: Tenryū Hamanako Railroad
- Line: ■ Tenryū Hamanako Line
- Distance: 24.4 kilometers from Kakegawa
- Platforms: 1 side platform

Other information
- Status: Unstaffed
- Website: Official website

History
- Opened: May 6, 1955

Passengers
- FY2016: 11 daily
Location
- Location within Shizuoka Prefecture Location within Japan

Kaminobe Station (上野部駅, Kaminobe-eki) is a railway station in the city of Iwata, Shizuoka Prefecture, Japan, operated by the third sector Tenryū Hamanako Railroad.

== Lines ==
Kaminobe Station is served by the Tenryū Hamanako Line, and is located 24.4 kilometers from the starting point of the line at Kakegawa Station.

== Station layout ==
The station has one side platform serving a single bi-directional track. There is no station building, but n enclosed wooden shelter on the platform. The station is unattended.

== Adjacent stations ==
«	Service	»
Tenryū Hamanako Railroad
Tenryū Hamanako Line
Toyooka	-	Tenryū-Futamata

== Station History ==
Kaminobe Station was established on May 6, 1955 as part of the Japan National Railways Futamata Line. On March 15, 1987, the station came under the control of the Tenryū Hamanako Line.

== Passenger statistics ==
In fiscal 2016, the station was used by an average of 11 passengers daily (boarding passengers only).

== Surrounding area ==
The station is located in a rural area with no settlement nearby

== See also ==
- List of railway stations in Japan
