= Harada Station =

Railway station in Kakegawa, Shizuoka Prefecture, Japan

Coordinates: 34°49′12.43″N 137°57′10.62″E

Harada Station 原田駅
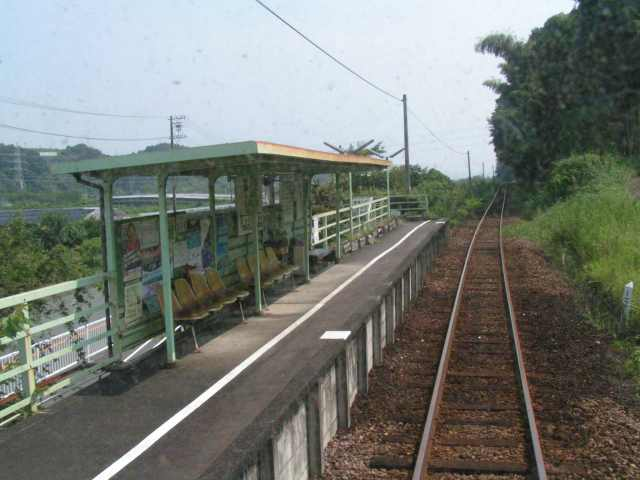
- Harada Station

General information
- Location: Itagaya, Kakegawa, Shizuoka （静岡県 掛川市板谷） Japan
- Operator: Tenryū Hamanako Railroad
- Line: Tenryū Hamanako Line

History
- Opened: 1988
Location

Harada Station (原田駅, Harada-eki) is a train station on the Tenryū Hamanako Line in Kakegawa, Shizuoka Prefecture, Japan. It is located 9.4 rail kilometers from the terminus of the line at Kakegawa Station.

== Station history ==
Harada Station was established on March 13, 1988.

It is often used as a set for movies and TV dramas due to its scenic location, surrounded by hills and rice fields in a relatively unpopulated area.

== Lines ==
- Tenryū Hamanako Railroad
  - Tenryū Hamanako Line

== Layout ==
Harada Station is an unstaffed station with a single elevated side platform,.

== Adjacent stations ==
«	Service	»
Tenryū Hamanako Railroad
Tenryū Hamanako Line
Haranoya	-	Towata
