= Haranoya Station =

Railway station in Kakegawa, Shizuoka Prefecture, Japan

Coordinates: 34.808647°N 137.955000°E

Haranoya Station 原谷駅
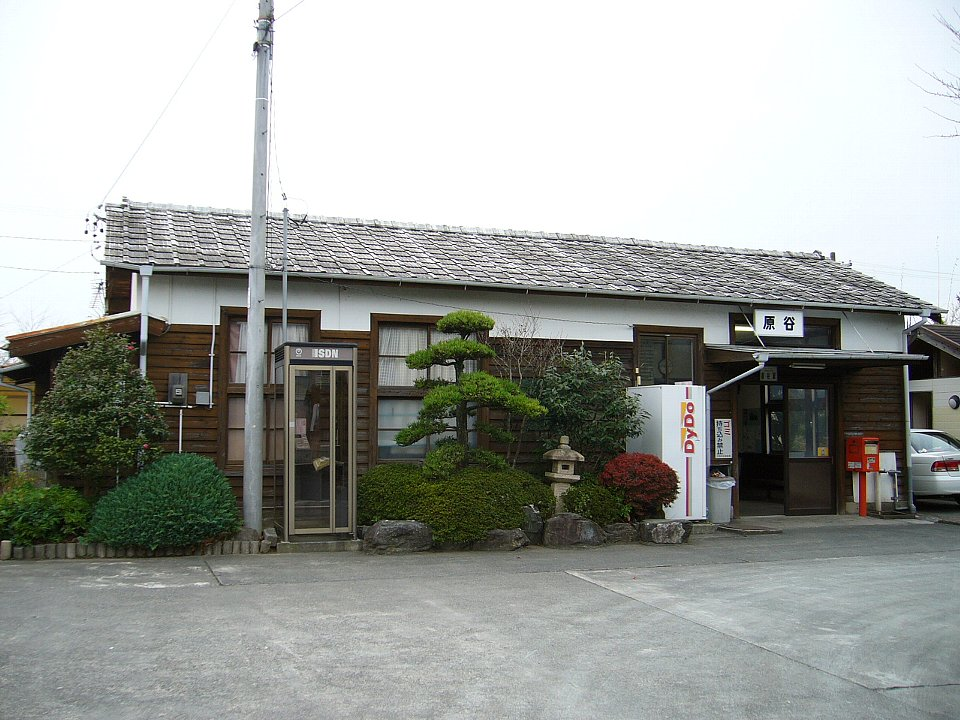
- Haranoya Station

General information
- Location: Hongo, Kakegawa, Shizuoka （静岡県 掛川市本郷） Japan
- Operator: Tenryū Hamanako Railroad
- Line: Tenryū Hamanako Line

History
- Opened: 1935
Location

Haranoya Station (原谷駅, Haranoya-eki) is a train station on the Tenryū Hamanako Line in Kakegawa, Shizuoka Prefecture, Japan. It is 5.9 rail kilometers from the terminus of the line at Kakegawa Station.

== Station history ==
Haranoya Station was established on April 17, 1935 as a station on the Japan National Railway Futamata line. Scheduled freight services were discontinued from August 1962.On March 15, 1987, the station came under the control of the Tenryū Hamanako Line. It was used as a set for Water Boys 2 (ウォーターボーイズ2, Wōtā Bōizu Tsū), a Japanese television drama series on Fuji Television in 2004.

== Lines ==
- Tenryū Hamanako Railroad
  - Tenryū Hamanako Line

== Layout ==
Haranoya Station has two opposed, elevated side platforms, and a small wooden station building.

== Adjacent stations ==
«	Service	»
Tenryū Hamanako Railroad
Tenryū Hamanako Line
Hosoya	-	Harada
