= Futamata-Hommachi Station =

Railway station in Hamamatsu, Japan

Futamata-Hommachi Station 二俣本町駅
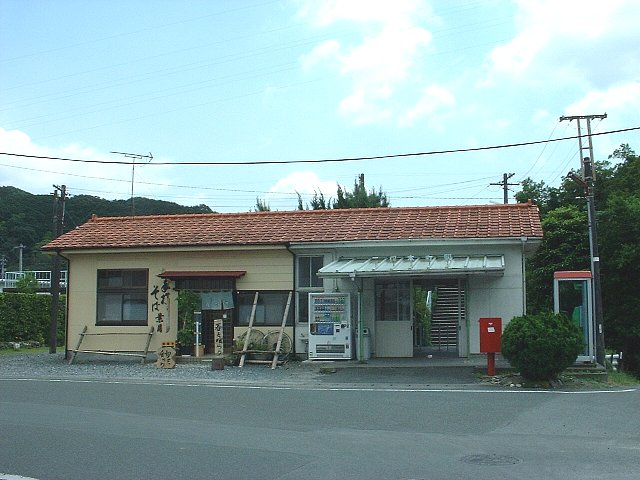
- Futamata-Hommachi Station in March 2006

General information
- Location: Futamata-cho, Futamata, Tenryū-ku, Hamamatsu-shi, Shizuoka-ken 431-3314; Japan
- Coordinates: 34°51′33.71″N 137°48′45.12″E
- Operator: Tenryū Hamanako Railroad
- Line: ■ Tenryū Hamanako Line
- Distance: 26.8 kilometers from Kakegawa
- Platforms: 1 island platform

Other information
- Status: Unstaffed
- Website: Official website

History
- Opened: December 15, 1956

Passengers
- FY2016: 54 daily
Location
- Location within Shizuoka Prefecture Location within Japan

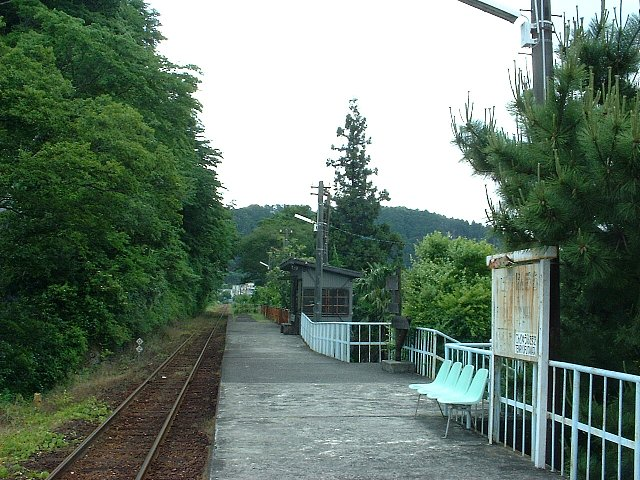
Platform

Futamata-Hommachi Station (二俣本町駅, Futamata-Hommachi-eki) is a railway station in Tenryū-ku, Hamamatsu, Shizuoka Prefecture, Japan, operated by the third sector Tenryū Hamanako Railroad.

== Lines ==
Futamata-Hommachi Station is served by the Tenryū Hamanako Line, and is located 26.8 kilometers from the starting point of the line at Kakegawa Station.

== Station layout ==
The station has one island platform located on an embankment, with the station building at a lower level. The station is unattended, but half of the station building is occupied by a privately operated café.

== Adjacent stations ==
«	Service	»
Tenryū Hamanako Railroad
Tenryū Hamanako Line
Tenryū-Futamata	-	Nishi-Kajima

== Station history ==
Futamata-Hommachi Station was established on December 15, 1956, as a passenger station on the Japan National Railways Futamata Line. After the privatization of JNR on March 15, 1987, the station came under the control of the Tenryū Hamanako Line.

== Passenger statistics ==
In fiscal 2016, the station was used by an average of 54 passengers daily (boarding passengers only).

== Surrounding area ==
- for Tenryu City Hall

== See also ==
- List of railway stations in Japan
