= Okaji =

Okaji may refer to:

- Okaji no Kata (1578–1642), a Japanese noblelady in the Sengoku era
- Okaji, a character in the 2013 Japanese Western film Unforgiven
- Okaji, a boss in the 2010 action video game Red Steel 2
- Okaji Station, a station in the Tenryū Hamanako Railroad line/system
