= Tenryū Hamanako Line =

Railway line in Shizuoka Prefecture, Japan

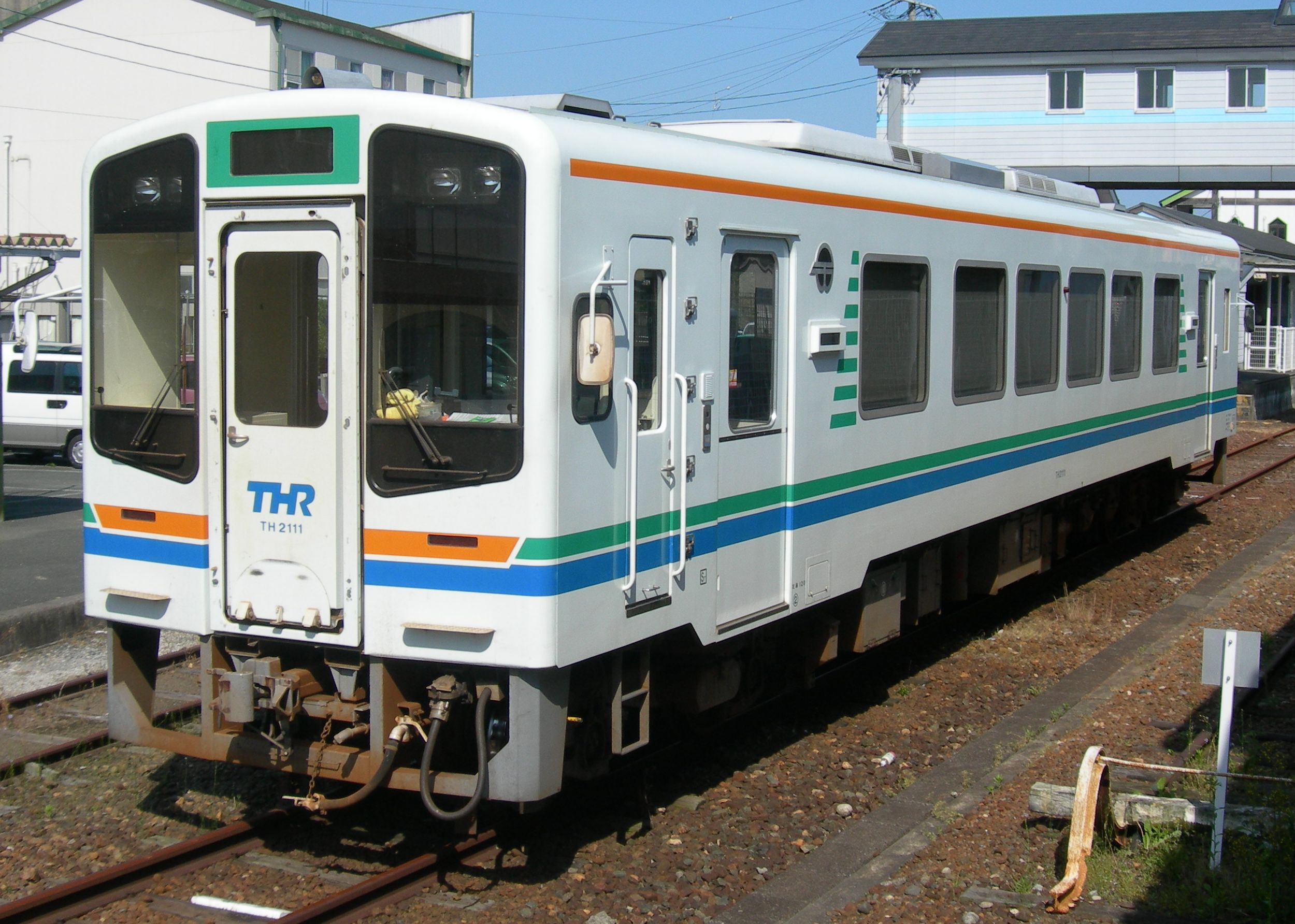
- TH2100 series train

Overview
- Locale: Shizuoka Prefecture
- Termini: Kakegawa; Shinjohara
- Stations: 37

Service
- Type: Heavy rail
- Operator: Tenryū Hamanako Railway

History
- Opened: 1936

Technical
- Line length: 67.7 kilometres (42.1 mi)
- Track gauge: 1,067 mm (3 ft 6 in)

Graphical Map

The Tenryū Hamanako Line (天竜浜名湖線, Tenryū Hamanako-sen), or Tenhama Line (天浜線, Tenhama-sen) for short, is a Japanese railway line in Shizuoka Prefecture, paralleling the north coast of Lake Hamana between Kakegawa Station in Kakegawa and Shinjohara Station in Kosai. This is the only railway line of Tenryū Hamanako Railroad (天竜浜名湖鉄道, Tenryū Hamanako Tetsudō).

== History ==
The Japanese National Railways Futamata Line (二俣線, Futamata sen) was built as an alternative route for the Tokaido Main Line and in particular as a backup for the bridge over Lake Hamana, which was considered potentially vulnerable to weather disruption. The Japanese military also supported the project as the new line would be less vulnerable to coastal attack than the existing section of the Tokaido Main Line. Operations began on April 17, 1935, between Kakegawa and Enshū-Mori. Construction work progressed in the opposite direction with the Futamata-Nishi Line (二俣西線, Futamata-Nishi sen) connecting Shinjohara with Mikkabi on December 1, 1936. This line was extended to Kaminobe by April 1, 1938, and the two lines were connected on June 1, 1940.

The line was used as a detour for the Tokaido Main Line following damage to it caused by the Tōnankai earthquake in December 1944 and military actions in July 1945.

Steam locomotives ceased service on the line in 1971, and all scheduled freight services were discontinued from 1984.

Operations of the former Futamata Line were taken over by the third-sector company Tenryū Hamanako Railroad in 1987, the same year Japanese National Railways was privatized.

Thirty-six features of the line (including bridges and station buildings) are registered tangible cultural properties of Japan.

=== Former connecting lines ===
- Tenryu-Futamata station – Construction started on a 35 km line to Chubu-Tenryu on the Iida Line in 1967. Proposed to involve 20 bridges and 14 tunnels, about 13 km of roadbed, and about 50% of the overall work had been completed when construction was abandoned in 1980.
- Kanasashi station – The 26 km 762mm gauge line from Entetsu Hamamatsu station on the Enshu Railway Line to Okuyama opened between 1914 and 1923. The 8 km Entetsu Hamamatsu - Hikuma section was electrified at 600 VDC in 1950, the line closing in 1963/4.

== Description ==
- Track: Single
- Power: Internal Combustion (Diesel)
- Railway signalling: Simplified automatic

== Stations ==
Name		Distance (km)	Connecting lines	Location	
Kakegawa	掛川	0.0	JR Central: Tōkaidō Shinkansen, Tōkaidō Main Line	Kakegawa	Shizuoka
Kakegawa-shiyakusho-mae	掛川市役所前	1.3		Kakegawa	Shizuoka
Nishi-Kakegawa	西掛川	1.8		Kakegawa	Shizuoka
Sakuragi	桜木	4.0		Kakegawa	Shizuoka
Ikoinohiroba	いこいの広場	5.5		Kakegawa	Shizuoka
Hosoya	細谷	6.0		Kakegawa	Shizuoka
Haranoya	原谷	7.9		Kakegawa	Shizuoka
Harada	原田	9.4		Kakegawa	Shizuoka
Towata	戸綿	12.0		Mori; Shūchi District	Shizuoka
Enshū-Mori	遠州森	12.8		Mori; Shūchi District	Shizuoka
Morimachibyōin-mae	森町病院前	13.6		Mori; Shūchi District	Shizuoka
Enden	円田	14.7		Mori; Shūchi District	Shizuoka
Tōtōmi-Ichinomiya	遠江一宮	16.4		Mori; Shūchi District	Shizuoka
Shikiji	敷地	19.9		Iwata	Shizuoka
Toyooka	豊岡	23.0		Iwata	Shizuoka
Kaminobe	上野部	24.4		Iwata	Shizuoka
Tenryū-Futamata	天竜二俣	26.2		Tenryū-ku; Hamamatsu	Shizuoka
Futamata-Hommachi	二俣本町	26.8		Tenryū-ku; Hamamatsu	Shizuoka
Nishi-Kajima	西鹿島	28.5	Enshū Railway Line	Tenryū-ku; Hamamatsu	Shizuoka
Gansuiji	岩水寺	30.3		Hamana-ku; Hamamatsu	Shizuoka
Miyaguchi	宮口	32.3		Hamana-ku; Hamamatsu	Shizuoka
Fruit Park	フルーツパーク	36.2		Hamana-ku; Hamamatsu	Shizuoka
Miyakoda	都田	37.7		Hamana-ku; Hamamatsu	Shizuoka
Tokohadaigakumae	常葉大学前	39.1		Hamana-ku; Hamamatsu	Shizuoka
Kanasashi	金指	41.9		Hamana-ku; Hamamatsu	Shizuoka
Okaji	岡地	43.5		Hamana-ku; Hamamatsu	Shizuoka
Kiga	気賀	44.8		Hamana-ku; Hamamatsu	Shizuoka
Nishi-Kiga	西気賀	47.7		Hamana-ku; Hamamatsu	Shizuoka
Sunza	寸座	49.4		Hamana-ku; Hamamatsu	Shizuoka
Hamanako-Sakume	浜名湖佐久米	50.7		Hamana-ku; Hamamatsu	Shizuoka
Higashi-Tsuzuki	東都筑	51.9		Hamana-ku; Hamamatsu	Shizuoka
Tsuzuki	都筑	53.3		Hamana-ku; Hamamatsu	Shizuoka
Mikkabi	三ヶ日	55.6		Hamana-ku; Hamamatsu	Shizuoka
Okuhamanako	奥浜名湖	56.8		Hamana-ku; Hamamatsu	Shizuoka
Ona	尾奈	58.1		Hamana-ku; Hamamatsu	Shizuoka
Chibata	知波田	62.9		Kosai	Shizuoka
Ōmori	大森	65.0		Kosai	Shizuoka
Asumomae	アスモ前	66.7		Kosai	Shizuoka
Shinjohara	新所原	67.7	JR Central: Tōkaidō Main Line	Kosai	Shizuoka

== See also ==
- List of railway companies in Japan
- List of railway lines in Japan
