= Nishi-Kakegawa Station =

Railway station in Kakegawa, Shizuoka Prefecture, Japan

Coordinates: 34.7720°N 137.9951°E

Nishi-Kakegawa Station 西掛川駅
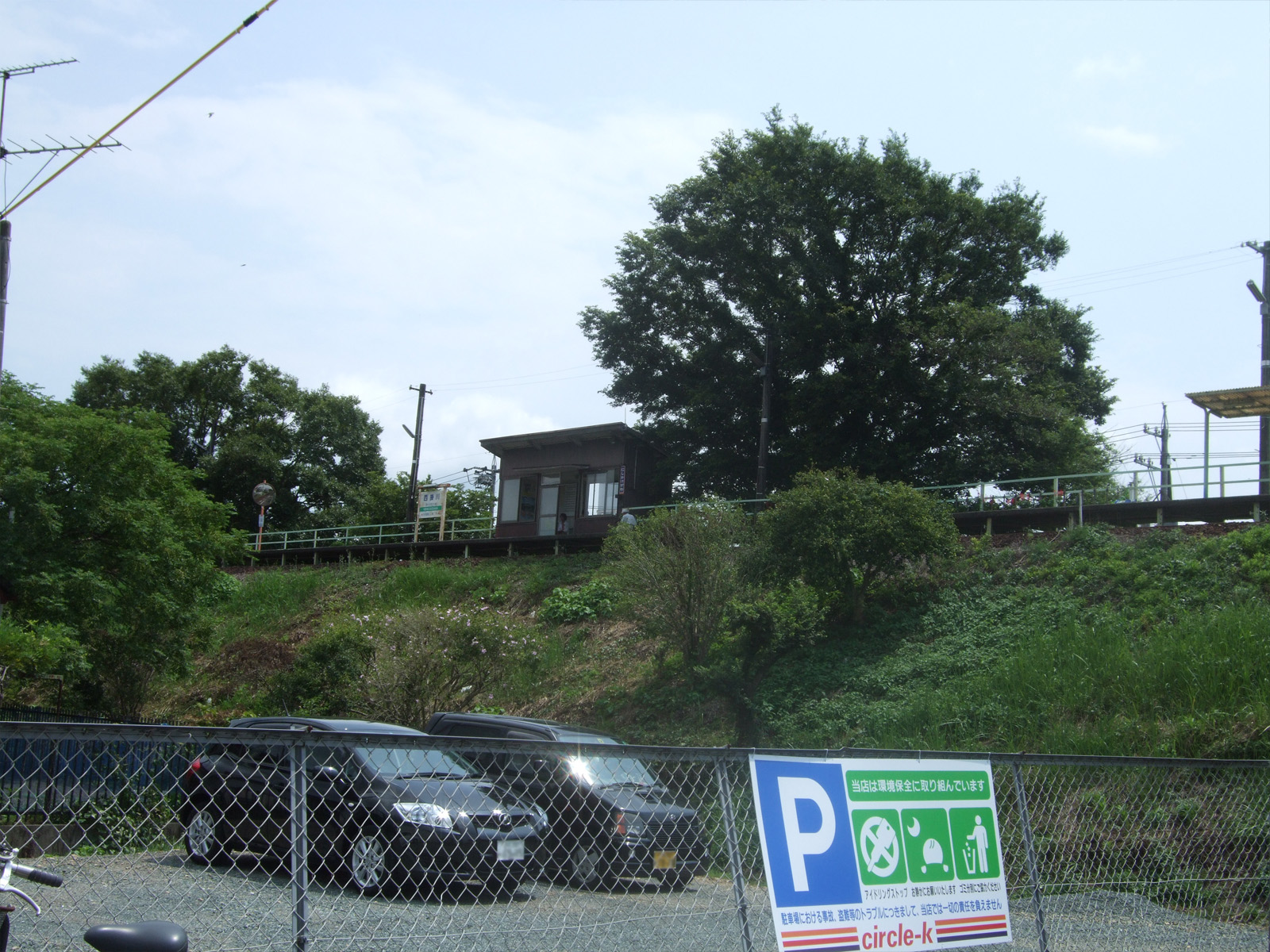
- Nishi-Kakegawa Station

General information
- Location: 934-3 Oike, Kakegawa, Shizuoka （静岡県 掛川市大池934-3） Japan
- Operator: Tenryū Hamanako Railroad
- Line: Tenryū Hamanako Line

History
- Opened: 1954
Location

Nishi-Kakegawa Station (西掛川駅, Nishi-Kakegawa-eki) is a train station in Kakegawa, Shizuoka Prefecture, Japan. It is located 1.8 rail kilometers from the terminus of the line at Kakegawa Station.

== Station History ==
Nishi-Kakegaa Station was established on May 10, 1956 as a passenger station on the Japan National Railway Futamata Line. After the privatization of JNR on March 15, 1987, the station came under the control of the Tenryū Hamanako Line.

== Lines ==
- Tenryū Hamanako Railroad
  - Tenryū Hamanako Line

== Layout ==
Nishi-Kakegawa Station is an unstaffed station with a single, elevated side platform.

== Adjacent stations ==
«	Service	»
Tenryū Hamanako Railroad
Tenryū Hamanako Line
Kakegawa-shiyakusho-mae	-	Sakuragi
