= Sakuragi Station =

Sakuragi Station (桜木駅) is the name of two train stations in Japan:

- Sakuragi Station (Chiba)
- Sakuragi Station (Shizuoka)
