= Towata Station =

Railway station in Mori, Shizuoka Prefecture, Japan

Towata Station 戸綿駅
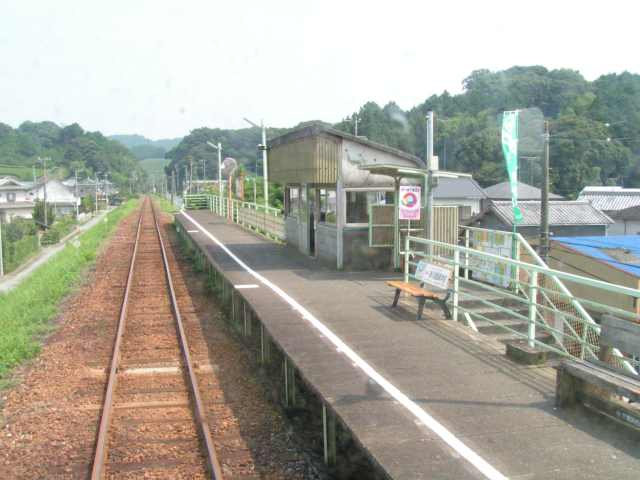
- Towata Station in August 2006

General information
- Location: Mutsumi, Mori-machi, Shūchi-gun, Shizuoka-ken; Japan
- Coordinates: 34°49′53.23″N 137°55′50.80″E
- Operator: Tenryū Hamanako Railroad
- Line: ■ Tenryū Hamanako Line
- Distance: 12.0 kilometers from Kakegawa
- Platforms: 1 side platform

Other information
- Status: Unstaffed
- Website: Official website

History
- Opened: April 13, 1960

Passengers
- FY2016: 128 daily
Location
- Location within Shizuoka Prefecture Location within Japan

Towata Station (戸綿駅, Towata-eki) is a railway station in the town of Mori, Shizuoka Prefecture, Japan, operated by the third sector Tenryū Hamanako Railroad.

== Lines ==
Towata Station is served by the Tenryū Hamanako Line, and is located 12.0 kilometers from the starting point of the line at Kakegawa Station.

== Station layout ==
The station has one elevated side platform serving a single track. The station is built on an embankment, with a small station building located at the platform, connected to the street by stairs. The station is unattended.

== Adjacent stations ==
«	Service	»
Tenryū Hamanako Railroad
Tenryū Hamanako Line
Harada	-	Enshū-Mori

== Station history ==
Towata Station was established on April 13, 1960, a station on the Japan National Railway Futamata line. On March 15, 1987, the station came under the control of the Tenryū Hamanako Line.

== Passenger statistics ==
In fiscal 2016, the station was used by an average of 128 passengers daily (boarding passengers only).

== Surrounding area ==
The station is located in a residential area.

== See also ==
- List of railway stations in Japan
