= Ōmori Station (Shizuoka) =

Railway station in Kosai, Shizuoka Prefecture, Japan

Ōmori Station 大森駅
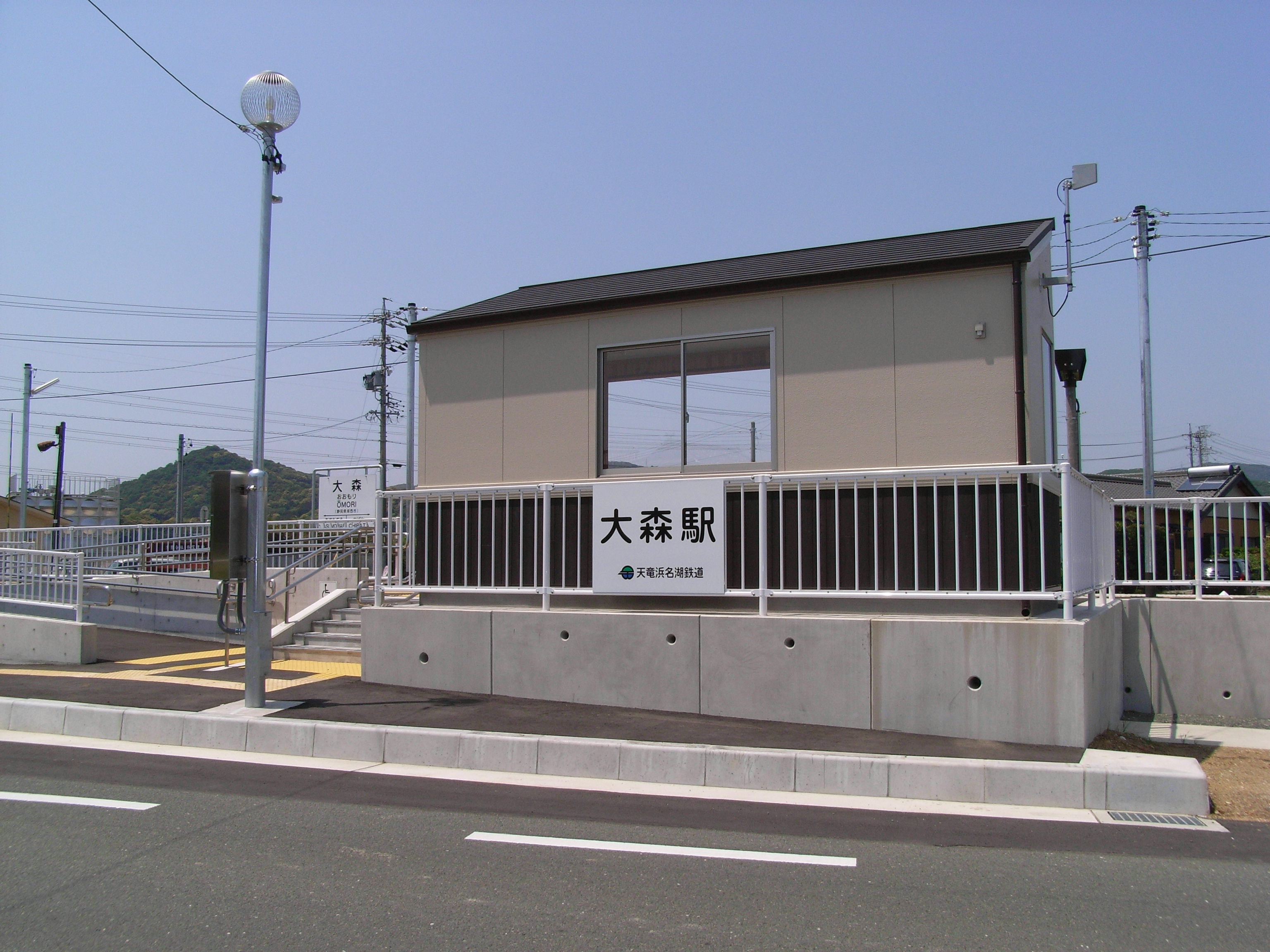
- Ōmori Station in 2009

General information
- Location: 5404-1 Shinjo, Kosai-shi, Shizuoka-ken 431-0421; Japan
- Coordinates: 34°44′16″N 137°30′35″E
- Operator: Tenryū Hamanako Railroad
- Line: ■ Tenryū Hamanako Line
- Distance: 65.0 kilometers from Kakegawa
- Platforms: 1 side platform

Other information
- Status: Unstaffed
- Website: Official website

History
- Opened: April 1, 2009

Passengers
- FY2016: 24 daily
Location
- Location within Shizuoka Prefecture Location within Japan

Ōmori Station (大森駅, Ōmori-eki) is a railway station in the city of Kosai, Shizuoka Prefecture, Japan, operated by the third sector Tenryū Hamanako Railroad.

== Lines ==
Ōmori Station is served by the Tenryū Hamanako Line, and is located 65.0 kilometers from the starting point of the line at Kakegawa Station.

== Station layout ==
The station has one side platform serving a single bi-directional track. The station is unattended.

== Adjacent stations ==
«	Service	»
Tenryū Hamanako Railroad
Tenryū Hamanako Line
Chibata	-	Asumomae

== History ==
Ōmori Station is newest station on the Tenryū Hamanako Line and opened on April 1, 2009.

== Passenger statistics ==
In fiscal 2016, the station was used by an average of 24 passengers daily (boarding passengers only).

== Surrounding area ==
- Japan National Route 301
- Kosai Junior High School

== See also ==
- List of railway stations in Japan
