= Asumomae Station =

Railway station in Kosai, Shizuoka Prefecture, Japan

Asumomae Station アスモ前駅
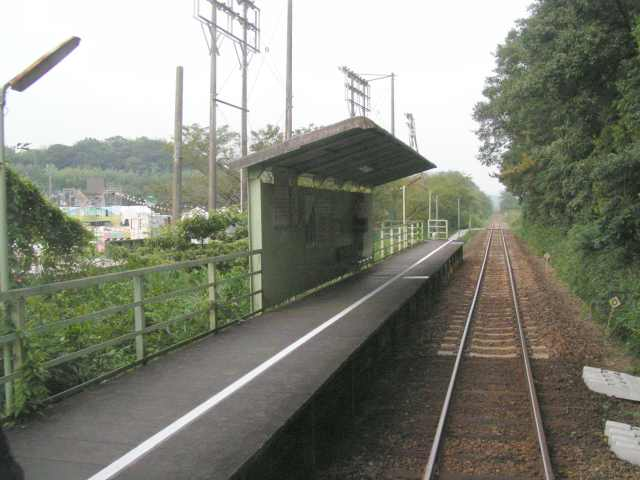
- Asumomae Station

General information
- Location: 52-3 Okazaki, Kosai-shi, Shizuoka-ken 431-0422; Japan
- Coordinates: 34°43′40″N 137°29′39″E
- Line: ■ Tenryū Hamanako Line
- Distance: 21.0 kilometers from Kakegawa
- Platforms: 1 side platform

Other information
- Status: Unstaffed
- Website: Official website

History
- Opened: March 15, 1988

Passengers
- FY2016: 21 daily
Location
- Location within Shizuoka Prefecture Location within Japan

Asumomae Station (アスモ前駅, Asumomae-eki) is a railway station in the city of Kosai, Shizuoka Prefecture, Japan, operated by the third sector Tenryū Hamanako Railroad. It is located in front of the former headquarters and factory of ASMO, an automobile components manufacturer and former subsidiary of Denso. For fiscal reasons, the station name is retained despite ASMO being absorbed by Denso in April 2018.

== Lines ==
Asumomae Station is served by the Tenryū Hamanako Line, and is located 66.7 kilometers from the starting point of the line at Kakegawa Station.

== Station layout ==
The station has one side platform serving a single bi-directional track. The station is unattended.

== Adjacent stations ==
«	Service	»
Tenryū Hamanako Railroad
Tenryū Hamanako Line
Ōmori	-	Shinjohara

== Station history ==
Asumomae Station was established on March 15, 1987, as part of the expansion of services on the Tenryū Hamanako Line after the privatization of JNR in 1987.

== Passenger statistics ==
In fiscal 2016, the station was used by an average of 21 passengers daily (boarding passengers only).

== Surrounding area ==
- Denso - Kosai factory

== See also ==
- List of railway stations in Japan
