= Toyooka (disambiguation) =

Toyooka is a city in Hyōgo Prefecture, Japan.

Toyooka may also refer to:

- Toyooka, Nagano, a village in Shimoina District, Nagano Prefecture, Japan
- Toyooka, Shizuoka, a former village in Iwata District, Shizuoka Prefecture, Japan
- Toyooka Domain, a feudal domain of Japan
- Toyooka Station (disambiguation), multiple railway stations in Japan

== People with the surname ==
- Hiroshi Toyooka (豊岡 弘, born 1969), Japanese cyclist
