= Kakegawa-shiyakusho-mae Station =

Railway station in Kakegawa, Shizuoka Prefecture, Japan

Coordinates: 34.770372°N 137.999851°E

Kakegawa Shiyakusho Mae Station 掛川市役所前駅
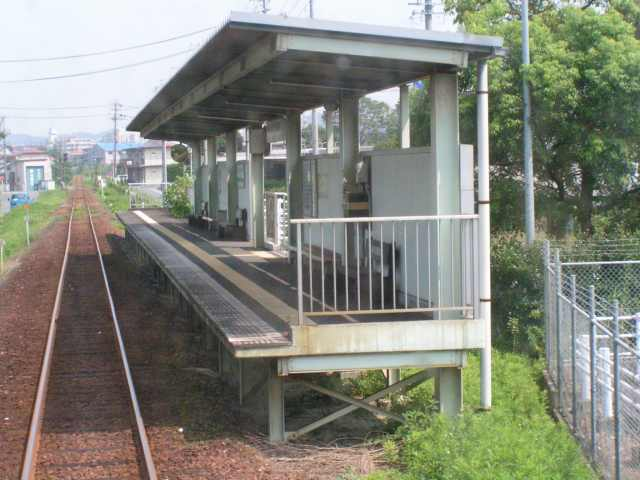
- Kakegawa-shiyakusho-mae Station platform

General information
- Location: Shimomata, Kakegawa, Shizuoka （静岡県 掛川市下俣ノ谷） Japan
- Operator: Tenryū Hamanako Railroad
- Line: Tenryū Hamanako Line

History
- Opened: 1996
Location

Kakegawa-shiyakusho-mae Station (掛川市役所前駅, Kakegawa-shiyakusho-mae-eki) is a train station on the Tenryū Hamanako Line in Kakegawa, Shizuoka Prefecture, Japan. It is located 1.3 rail kilometers from the terminus of the line at Kakegawa Station.

== Station History ==
Kakegawa-shiyakusho-mae Station was established on March 18, 1996 as a commuter station after the relocation of Kakegawa city hall to a nearby location. The station is also located near a number of large factories.

== Lines ==
- Tenryū Hamanako Railroad
  - Tenryū Hamanako Line

== Layout ==
Kakegawa-shiyakusho-mae Station is an unstaffed station with a single, elevated side platform.

== Adjacent stations ==
«	Service	»
Tenryū Hamanako Railroad
Tenryū Hamanako Line
Kakegawa	-	Nishi-Kakegawa
