= Morimachibyōin-mae Station =

Railway station in Mori, Shizuoka Prefecture, Japan

Morimachibyōin-mae Station 森町病院前駅
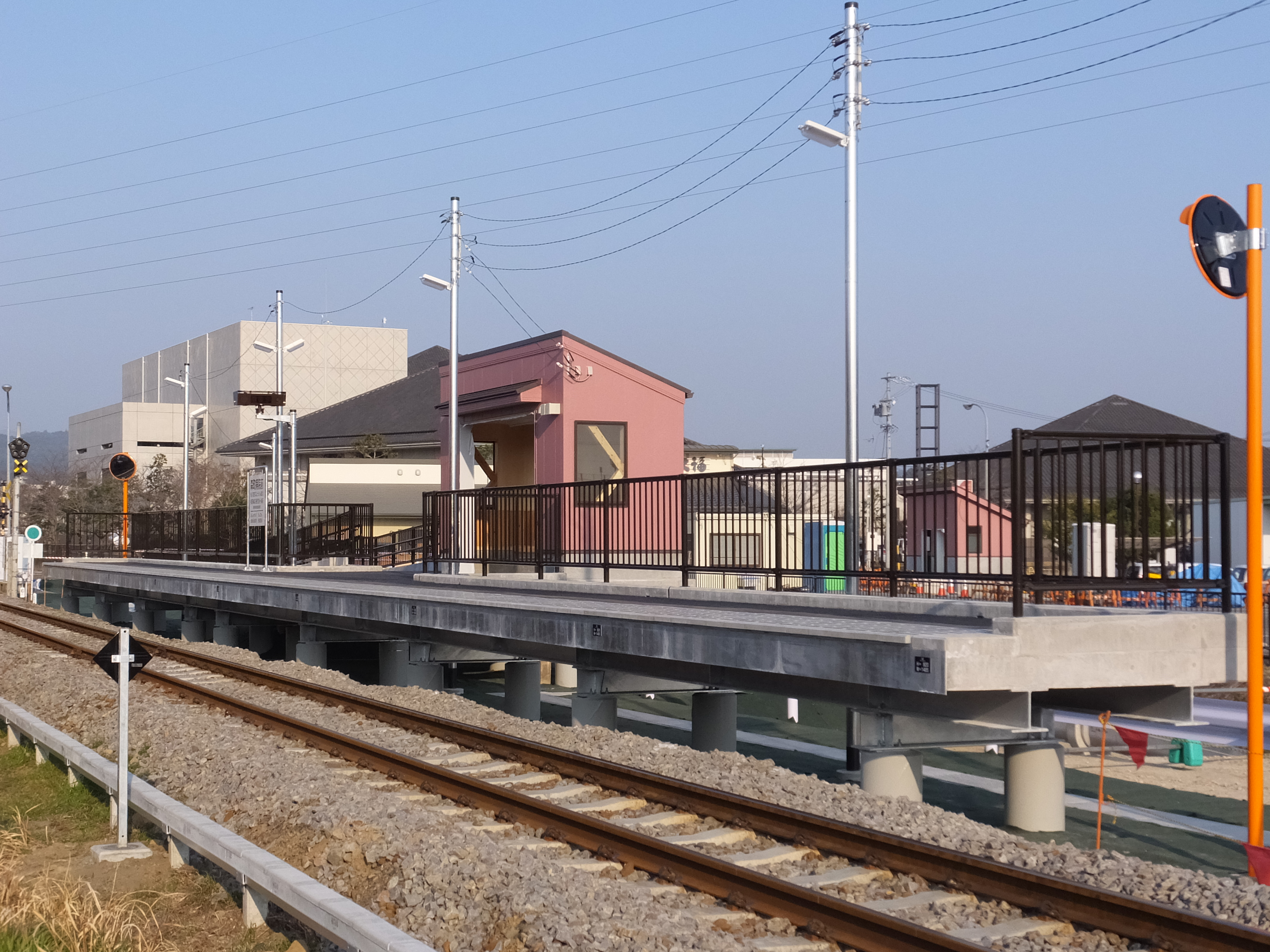
- Morimachibyōin-mae Station in February 2015

General information
- Location: Kusagaya 37.2, Mori-machi, Shūchi-gun, Shizuoka-ken 437-0214; Japan
- Coordinates: 34°49′35.0″N 137°55′04.6″E
- Operator: Tenryū Hamanako Railroad
- Line: ■ Tenryū Hamanako Line
- Distance: 13.6 kilometers from Kakegawa
- Platforms: 1 side platform

Other information
- Status: Unstaffed
- Website: Official website

History
- Opened: March 14, 2015

Passengers
- FY2016: 34 daily
Location
- Location within Shizuoka Prefecture Location within Japan

Morimachibyōin-mae Station (森町病院前駅, Morimachibyōin-mae-eki) is a railway station in the town of Mori, Shizuoka Prefecture, Japan, operated by the third sector Tenryū Hamanako Railroad.

== Lines ==
Morimachibyōin-mae Station is served by the Tenryū Hamanako Line, and is located 13.6 kilometers from the starting point of the line at Kakegawa Station.

== Station layout ==
The station has one side platform serving a single track. The station had a shelter on the platform, but no station building. The station is unattended.

== Adjacent stations ==
«	Service	»
Tenryū Hamanako Railroad
Tenryū Hamanako Line
Enshū-Mori	-	Enden

== Station History ==
Morimachibyōin-mae Station was established on March 14, 2015.

== Passenger statistics ==
In fiscal 2016, the station was used by an average of 34 passengers daily (boarding passengers only).

== Surrounding area ==
- Mori town hospital

== See also ==
- List of railway stations in Japan
