= Sakuragi Station (Shizuoka) =

Railway station in Kakegawa, Shizuoka Prefecture, Japan

Coordinates: 34.778279°N 137.972960°E

Sakuragi Station 桜木駅
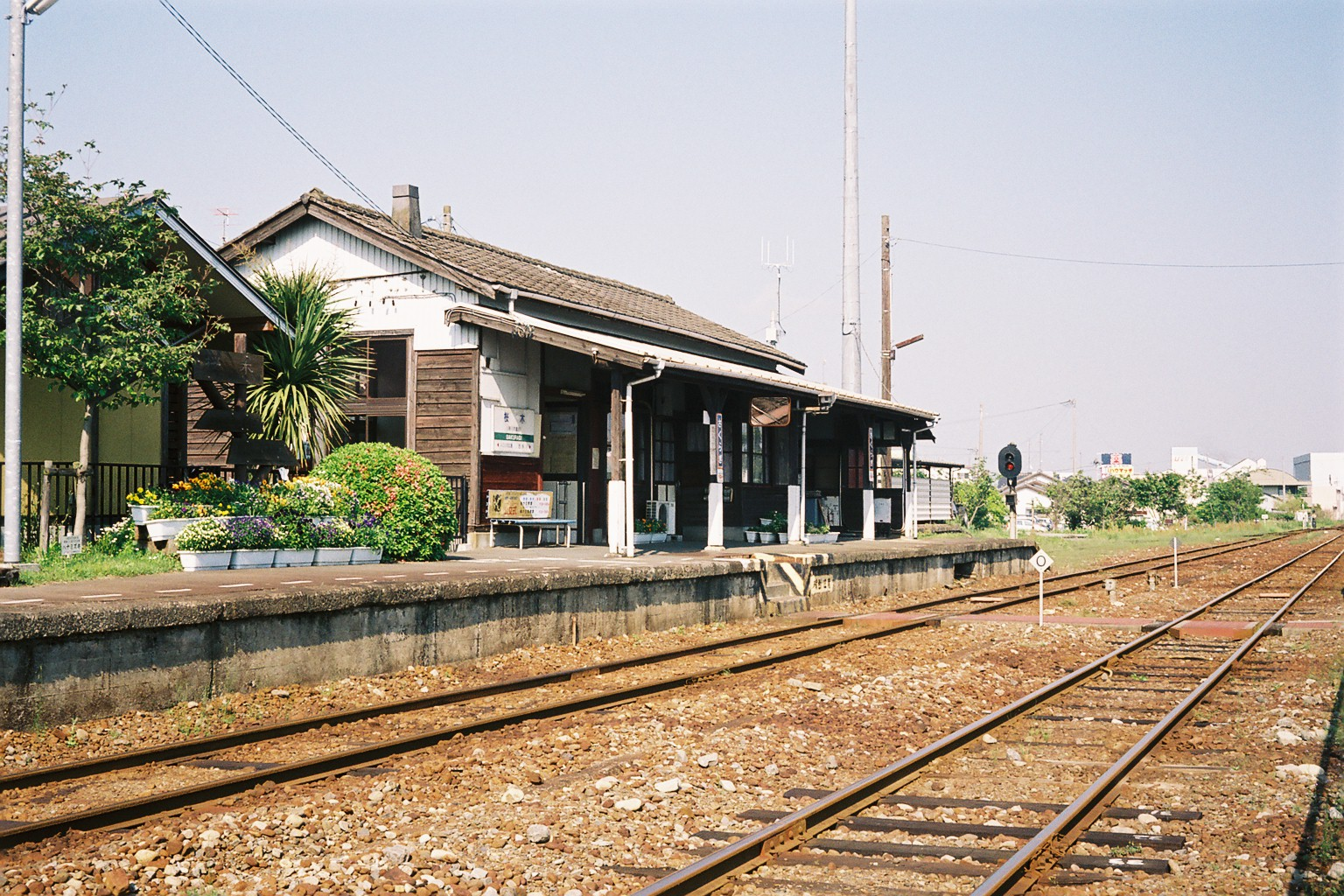
- Sakuragi Station platform

General information
- Location: Tonbe, Kakegawa, Shizuoka （静岡県 掛川市富部） Japan
- Operator: Tenryū Hamanako Railroad
- Line: Tenryū Hamanako Line

History
- Opened: 1935
Location

Sakuragi Station (桜木駅, Sakuragi-eki) is a train station on the Tenryū Hamanako Line in Kakegawa, Shizuoka Prefecture, Japan. It is 4.0 rail kilometers from the terminus of the line at Kakegawa Station.

== Station history ==
Sakuragi Station was established on April 17, 1935 as a station on the Japan National Railway Futamata line named Tōtōmi-Sakuragi Station (遠江桜木駅). Scheduled freight services were discontinued from November 1971. On March 15, 1987, the station came under the control of the Tenryū Hamanako Line.

== Lines ==
- Tenryū Hamanako Railroad
  - Tenryū Hamanako Line

== Layout ==
Sakuragi Station has two opposed, elevated side platforms, and a small wooden station building.

== Adjacent stations ==
«	Service	»
Tenryū Hamanako Railroad
Tenryū Hamanako Line
Nishi-Kakegawa	-	Ikoinohiroba
