= Toyooka Station =

Toyooka Station (豊岡駅) is the name of two train stations in Japan:

- Toyooka Station (Hyōgo)
- Toyooka Station (Shizuoka)
