= Shinjohara Station =

Railway station in Kosai, Shizuoka Prefecture, Japan

CA40 Shinjohara Station 新所原駅
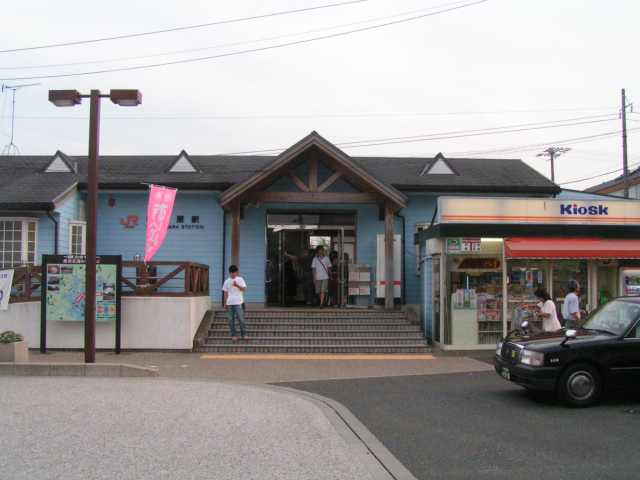
- JR Shinjohara Station in 2008

General information
- Location: 3-4-1 Shinjohara, Kosai-shi, Shizuoka-ken 431-0424; Japan
- Coordinates: 34°43′24″N 137°29′06″E
- Operator: JR Central; Tenryū Hamanako Railroad
- Lines: Tōkaidō Main Line; ■ Tenryū Hamanako Line
- Distance: 282.4 km from Tokyo
- Platforms: 1 side + 1 island + 1 side platform
- Connections: Bus terminal

History
- Opened: 1 December 1936

Passengers
- 3,636 daily (JR Central 2023–2024); 558 daily (Tenryū Hamanako Line 2006–2007)
Location
- Location within Shizuoka Prefecture Location within Japan

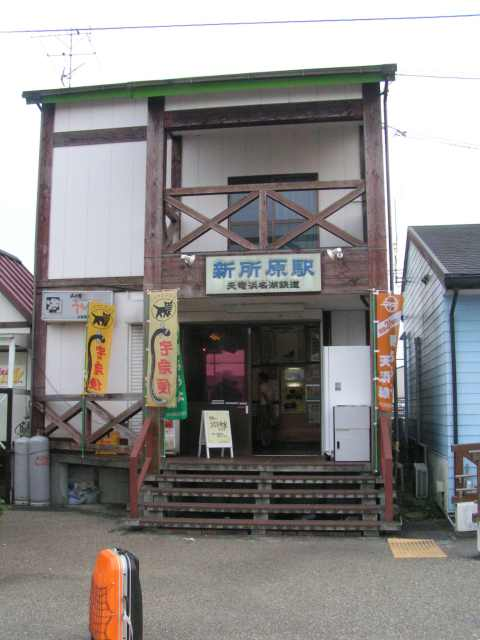
Tenryū Hamanako Line Shinjohara Station

Shinjohara Station (新所原駅, Shinjohara-eki) is a railway station in the city of Kosai, Shizuoka, Japan operated by both JR Central and by the third sector Tenryū Hamanako Railroad. The station serves both Kosai, and a portion of Toyohashi. The border between Shizuoka Prefecture and Aichi Prefecture bisects the platform of Shinjohara Station.

== Lines ==
Shinjohara Station is served by the Tōkaidō Main Line and is located 282.4 kilometers from the starting point of the line at Tokyo Station. It is also a terminal station for the Tenryū Hamanako Line and is located 67.7 kilometers from the opposing terminus at Kakegawa Station.

== Station layout ==
The JR Central portion of the station has a side platform serving track 1 and an island platform serving tracks 2 and 3, but track 3 is seldom used. The platforms are connected by a footbridge. The station building has automated ticket machines, TOICA automated ticket barriers, and a staffed ticket office. The Tenryū Hamanako Line Station a single dead-headed side platform serving one track. The station building is a two-story structure located to the east of the single-story JR building.

=== Platforms ===
1	■ Tōkaidō Main Line	for Hamamatsu, Shizuoka, and Numazu
2・3	■ Tōkaidō Main Line	for Toyohashi, Nagoya, Ogaki, and Maibara
1	■ Tenryū Hamanako Line	for Kakegawa

== Adjacent stations ==
«	Service	»
Tōkaidō Main Line
Washizu	Special Rapid	Futagawa
Washizu	New Rapid	Futagawa
Washizu	Local	Futagawa
Tenryū Hamanako Line
Asumomae	-	Terminus

== History ==
The station opened on December 1, 1936. With the privatization of Japanese National Railways (JNR) on 1 April 1987, the station came under the control of JR Central.

Station numbering was introduced to the section of the Tōkaidō Line operated JR Central in March 2018; Shinjohara Station was assigned station number CA40.

== Passenger statistics ==
In fiscal 2017, the JR portion of the station was used by an average of 3975 passengers daily and the Tenryū Hamanako Railroad portion was used by 762 passengers daily (boarding passengers only).

== Surrounding area ==
- former Shinjo village hall

== See also ==
- List of railway stations in Japan
