= Enshū-Mori Station =

Railway station in Mori, Shizuoka Prefecture, Japan

Enshū-Mori Station 遠州森駅
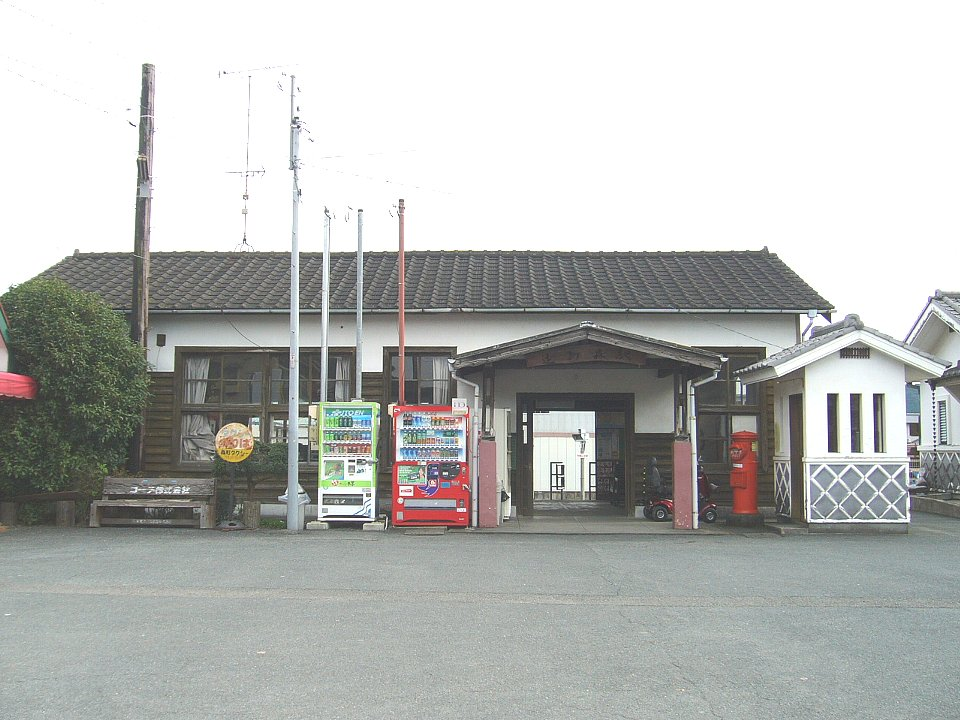
- Enshū-Mori Station in November 2006

General information
- Location: Mori 980-2, Mori-machi, Shūchi-gun, Shizuoka-ken 437-0215; Japan
- Coordinates: 34°49′51.24″N 137°55′25.37″E
- Operator: Tenryū Hamanako Railroad
- Line: ■ Tenryū Hamanako Line
- Distance: 12.8 kilometers from Kakegawa
- Platforms: 1 side + 1 island platform

Other information
- Status: Staffed
- Website: Official website

History
- Opened: April 17, 1935

Passengers
- FY2016: 362 daily
Location
- Location within Shizuoka Prefecture Location within Japan

Enshū-Mori Station (遠州森駅, Enshū-Mori-eki) is a railway station in the town of Mori, Shizuoka Prefecture, Japan, operated by the third sector Tenryū Hamanako Railroad.

== Lines ==
Enshū-Mori Station is served by the Tenryū Hamanako Line, and is located 12.8 kilometers from the starting point of the line at Kakegawa Station.

== Station layout ==
The station has a side platform and an island platform serving three tracks, connected to an old wooden station building by a level crossing. The station is staffed. The station building and platform, which were built in 1935 were designated a Registered Tangible Cultural Property in 2011.

== Adjacent stations ==
«	Service	»
Tenryū Hamanako Railroad
Tenryū Hamanako Line
Towata	-	Morimachibyōin-mae

== Station History ==
Enshū-Mori Station was established on April 17, 1935, the terminal station on the Japan National Railway Futamata line, until the extension of the line to Kanasashi Station on June 1, 1940. Freight services were discontinued in 1970. On March 15, 1987, the station came under the control of the Tenryū Hamanako Line.

== Passenger statistics ==
In fiscal 2016, the station was used by an average of 362 passengers daily (boarding passengers only).

== Surrounding area ==
- Mori town hall

== See also ==
- List of railway stations in Japan
