= Kanasashi Station =

Railway station in Hamamatsu, Japan

Kanasashi Station 金指駅
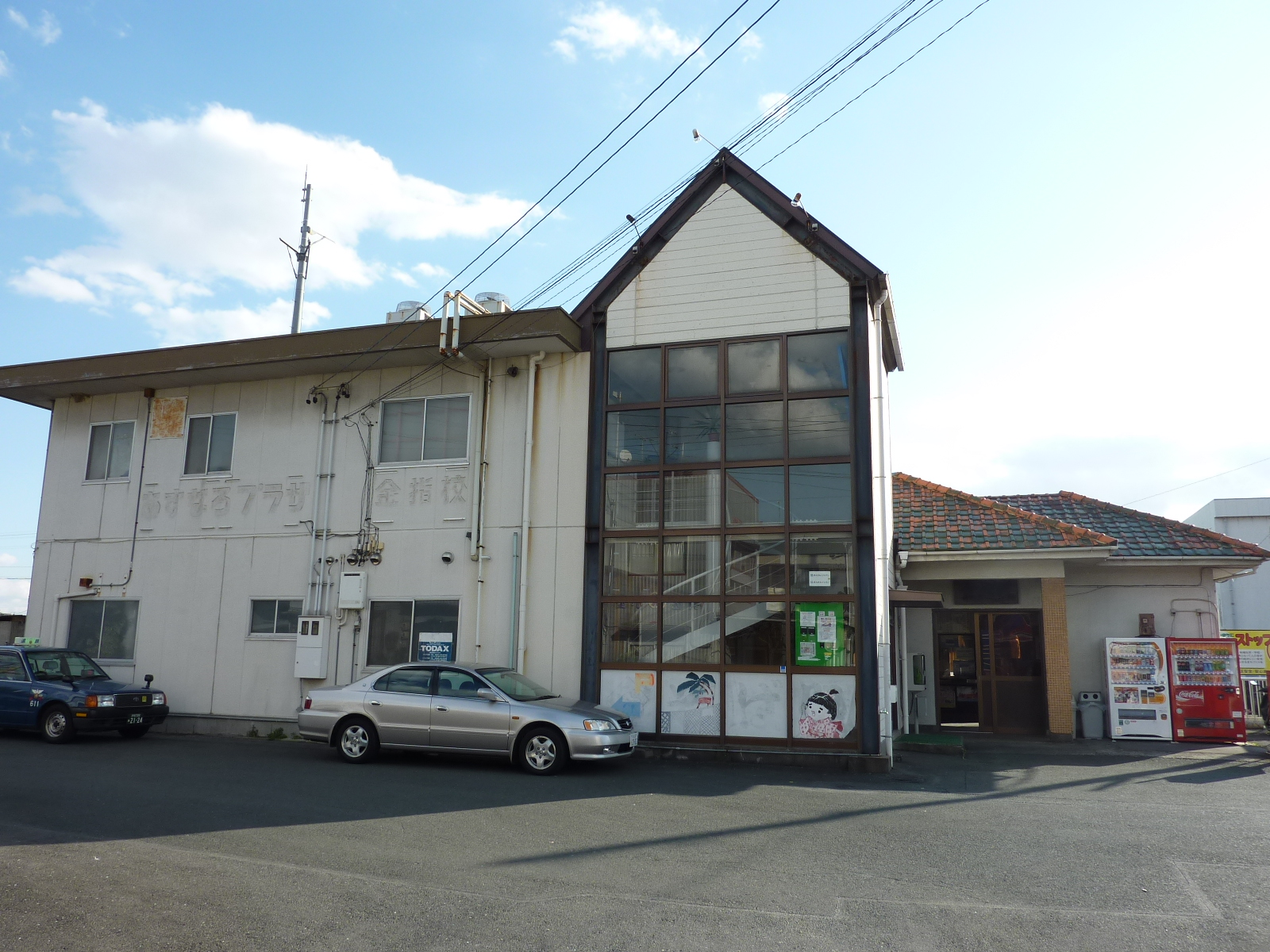
- Kanasashi Station in December 2009

General information
- Location: Inasa-cho, Kanasahi, Hamana-ku, Hamamatsu-shi, Shizuoka-ken 431-2213; Japan
- Coordinates: 34°49′01″N 137°40′52″E
- Operator: Tenryū Hamanako Railroad
- Line: ■ Tenryū Hamanako Line
- Distance: 41.9 kilometers from Kakegawa
- Platforms: 1 island platform

Other information
- Status: Unstaffed
- Website: Official website

History
- Opened: April 1, 1938

Passengers
- FY2016: 339 daily
Location
- Location within Shizuoka Prefecture Location within Japan

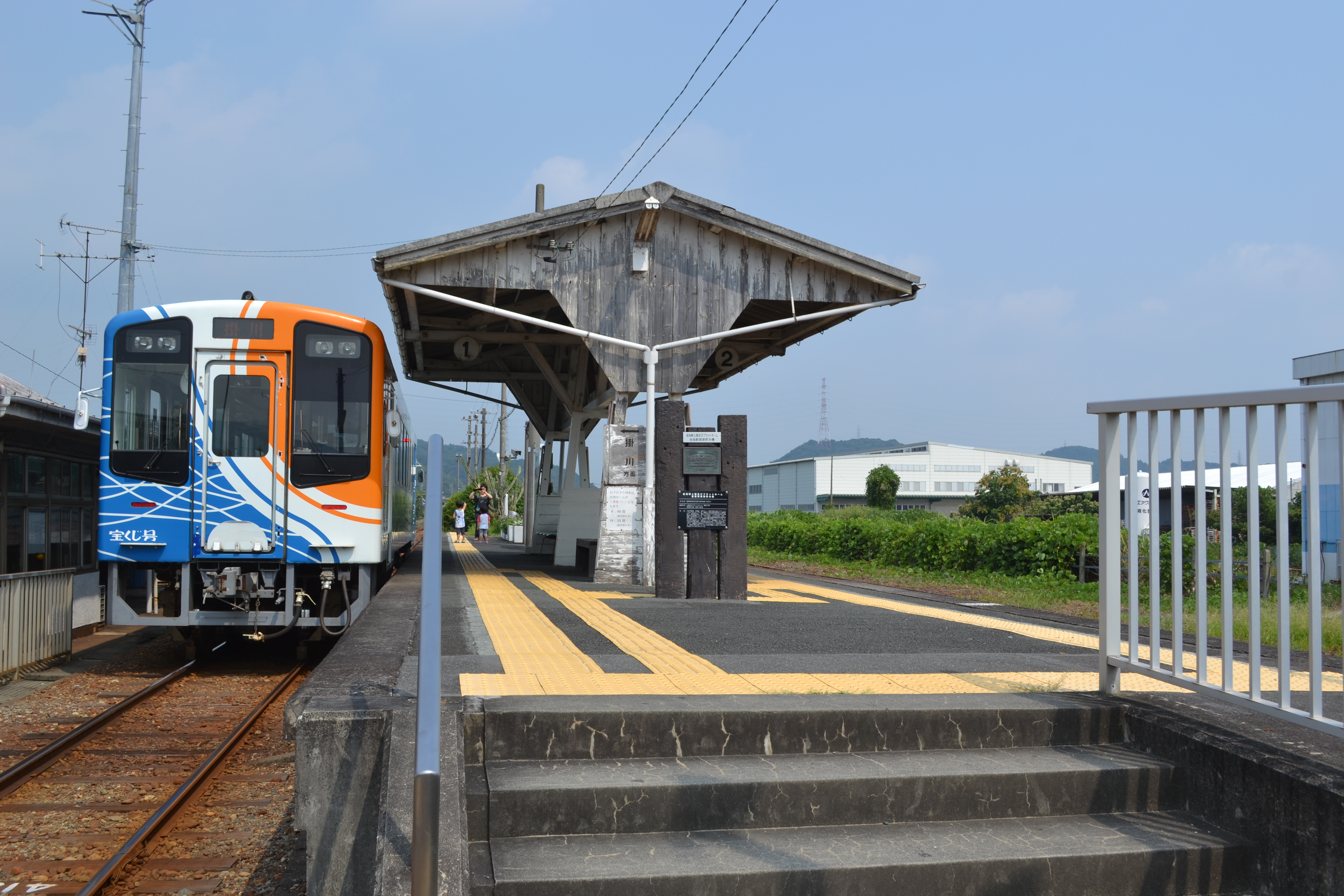
Platform

Kanasashi Station (金指駅, Kanasashi-eki) is a railway station in Hamana-ku, Hamamatsu, Shizuoka Prefecture, Japan, operated by the third sector Tenryū Hamanako Railroad.

== Lines ==
Kanasashi Station is served by the Tenryū Hamanako Line, and is located 41.9 kilometers from the starting point of the line at Kakegawa Station.

== Station layout ==
The station has a single island platform and a two-story station building. Until 1964, an adjacent island platform to the south of the station served a spur line of the Enshū Railway. The station building, platform and water tower are protected as Registered Tangible Cultural Properties of Japan since 2011.

== Adjacent stations ==
«	Service	»
Tenryū Hamanako Railroad
Tenryū Hamanako Line
Tokohadaigakumae	-	Okaji

== Station History ==
Kanasashi Station was established on April 1, 1938, as the terminal station of the Japan National Railways Futamata Line. The line was further extended to Enshū-Mori Station by June 1, 1940. Scheduled freight services were discontinued from March 1985, marking the final end of all freight services on the line. On March 15, 1987, the station came under the control of the Tenryū Hamanako Line.

== Passenger statistics ==
In fiscal 2016, the station was used by an average of 339 passengers daily (boarding passengers only).

== Surrounding area ==
- Hamamatsu Kohoku High School
- Japan National Route 362

== See also ==
- List of railway stations in Japan
