= Hamana-ku =

Hamana 浜名区
- Ward
- Hamana Ward
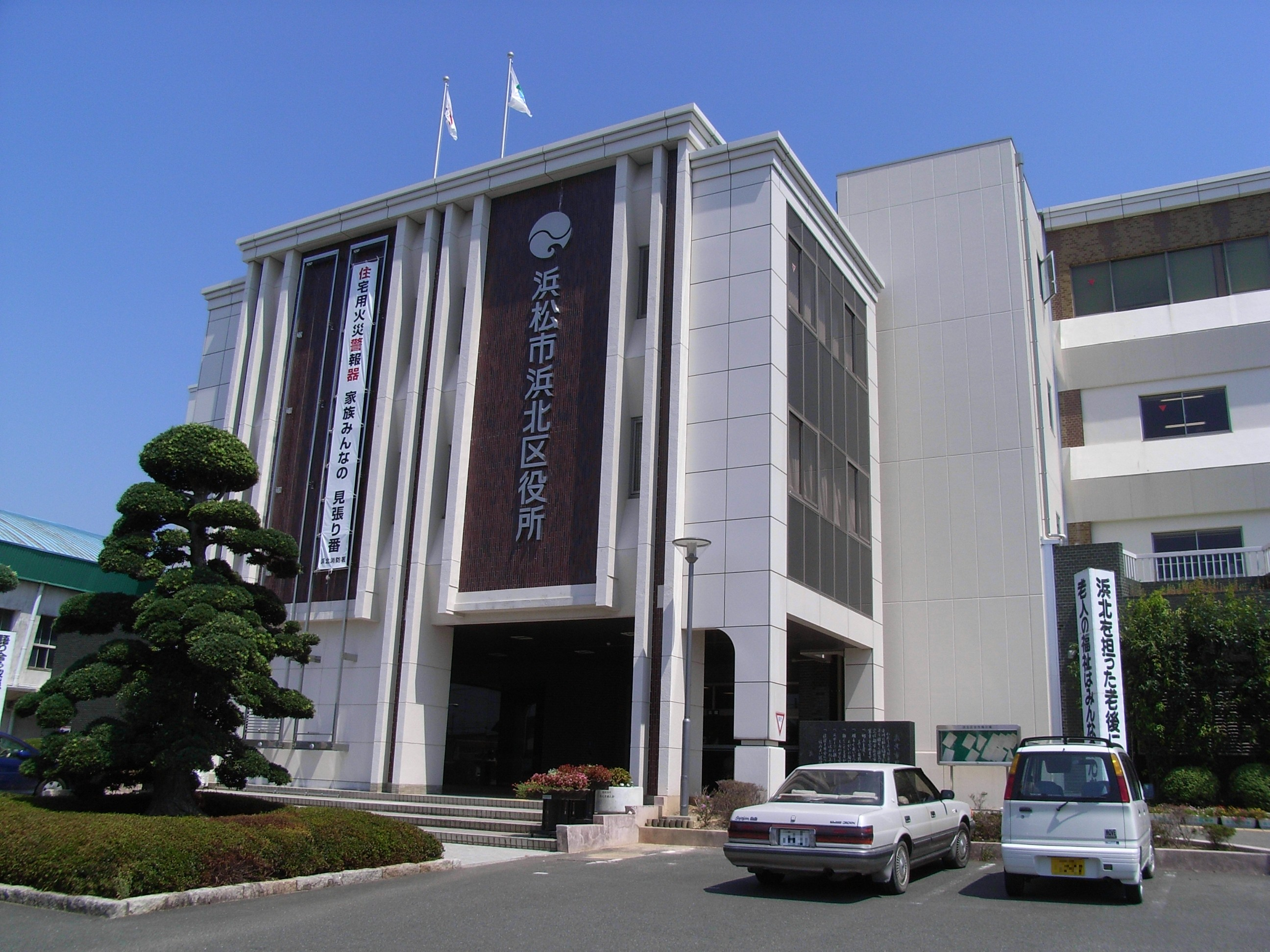
- Hamakita Ward Office, which will become Hamana Ward Office

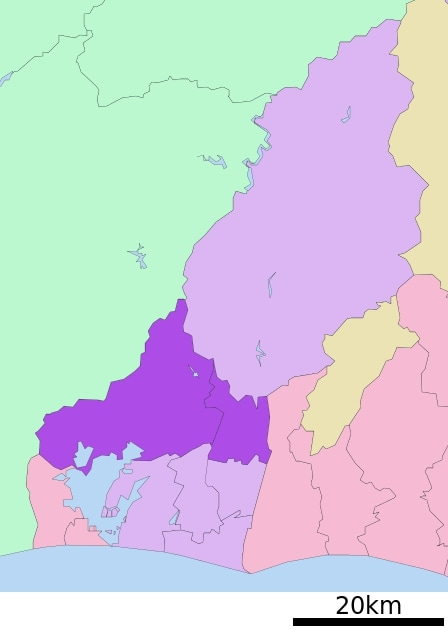
- Location of Hamana-ku in Shizuoka

- Coordinates: 34°46′30″N 137°48′56″E
- Country: Japan
- Region: Chūbu
- Prefecture: Shizuoka
- City: Hamamatsu

Area
  - Total: 345.77 km^{2} (133.50 sq mi)
- area of the region which will be Hamana-ku

Population (October 1, 2023)
  - Total: 155,996
  - Density: 451.16/km^{2} (1,168.5/sq mi)
- population of the area which will be Chūō-ku
- Time zone: UTC+9 (Japan Standard Time)
- Phone number: 053-926-1111
- Address: Nishimisono 6-banchi, Hamana-ku, Hamamatsu, Shizuoka 434-8550

Hamana-ku (浜名区, Hamana-ku) is one of the three wards of Hamamatsu, Shizuoka, Japan, located in the middle part of the city. It is bordered by Chūō-ku, Tenryū-ku, Iwata, Shizuoka, Kosai, Shizuoka, Shinshiro, Toyohashi.

== History ==
- January 1, 2024 - Former wards of Hamakita-ku and most of Kita-ku formed Hamana-ku.
