= Kakegawa Station =

Railway station in Kakegawa, Shizuoka Prefecture, Japan

CA27 Kakegawa Station 掛川駅
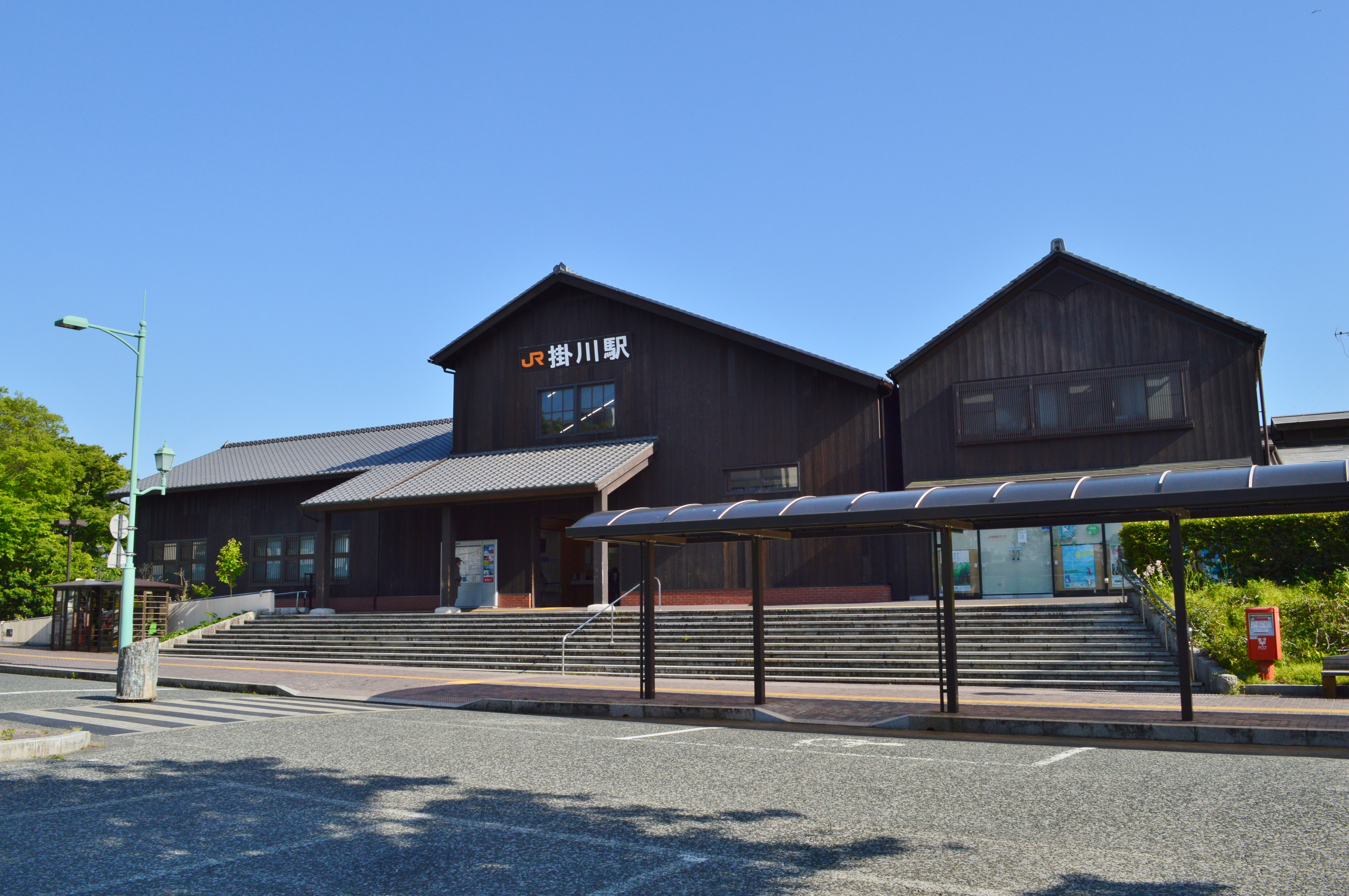

General information
- Location: 1-1-1 Minami, Kakegawa-shi, Shizuoka-ken; Japan
- Coordinates: 34°46′11″N 138°00′54″E
- Operator: JR Central; Tenryū Hamanako Railroad
- Lines: Tokaido Shinkansen; Tōkaidō Main Line; Tenryū Hamanako Line
- Distance: 229.3 km (142.5 mi) from Tokyo
- Connections: Bus terminal

Other information
- Status: Staffed
- Website: Official website

History
- Opened: 16 April 1889; 137 years ago

Passengers
- FY 2023: 21,187 daily (JR Central); 7,926 daily (Shinkansen)

Services
Preceding station	JR Central	Following station
Hamamatsu towards Shin-Ōsaka	Tokaido Shinkansen Kodama	Shizuoka towards Tokyo
Location
- Location within Shizuoka Prefecture Location within Japan

Kakegawa Station (掛川駅, Kakegawa-eki) is an interchange railway station in the city of Kakegawa, Shizuoka Prefecture, Japan, jointly operated by Central Japan Railway Company (JR Tōkai). It is connected to the adjacent Tenryū-Hamanako Railway Kakegawa Station, which is located in a separate building.

== Lines ==
Kakegawa Station is served by the Tōkaidō Shinkansen and the Tōkaidō Main Line and is 229.3 kilometers (142.5 mi) from Tokyo Station. It is also the terminus for the Tenryū Hamanako Railroad Tenryū Hamanako Line and is located 67.7 kilometers (42.1 mi) from the opposing terminus at Shinjohara Station.

== Layout ==
JR Kakegawa Station has five platforms serving eight tracks. The Tōkaidō Main Line Track 1 is served by a side platform connected to the main station building's north exit and the Tenryū Hamanako Line station. It is used for departing both east and west. Track 2 and Track 3 are served by an island platform. Both platforms are connected to the station building by an underpass, which also connects to the two elevated side platforms used by the Shinkansen (Track 4 and Track 5, with two additional centre tracks for non-stop passing trains). The north side of the station is a wooden structure dating from 1940. The station building has automated ticket machines, TOICA automated turnstiles and a staffed ticket office.

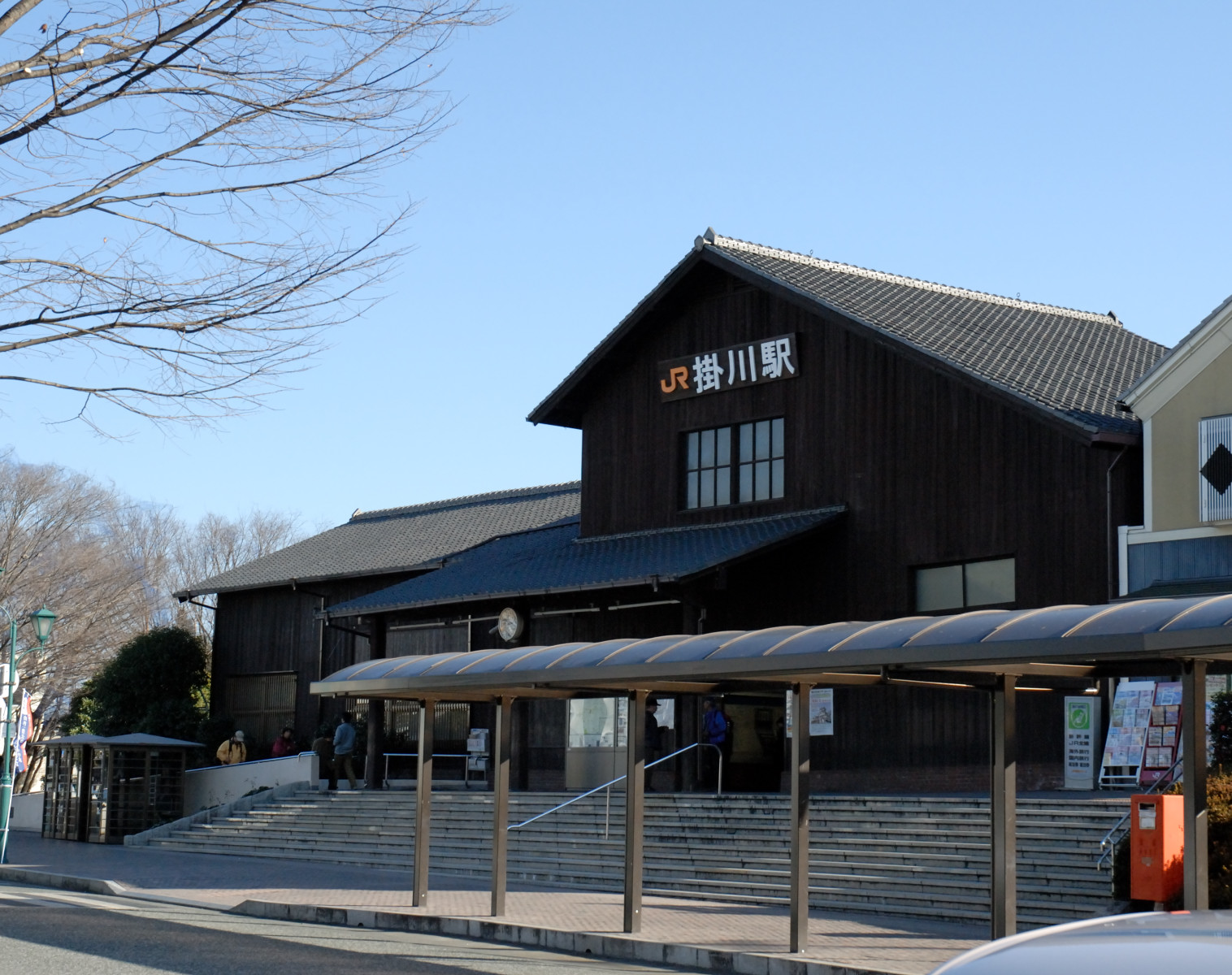
North exit to JR Kakegawa Station

=== Platforms ===
1	■ Tōkaidō Main Line	Shimada・Shizuoka・Hamamatsu・Toyohashi
2	■ Tōkaidō Main Line	Shimada・Shizuoka
3	■ Tōkaidō Main Line	Hamamatsu・Toyohashi
4	■ Tōkaidō Shinkansen	Shizuoka ・ Tokyo
5	■ Tōkaidō Shinkansen	Nagoya ・ Shin-Osaka

=== Transfers ===
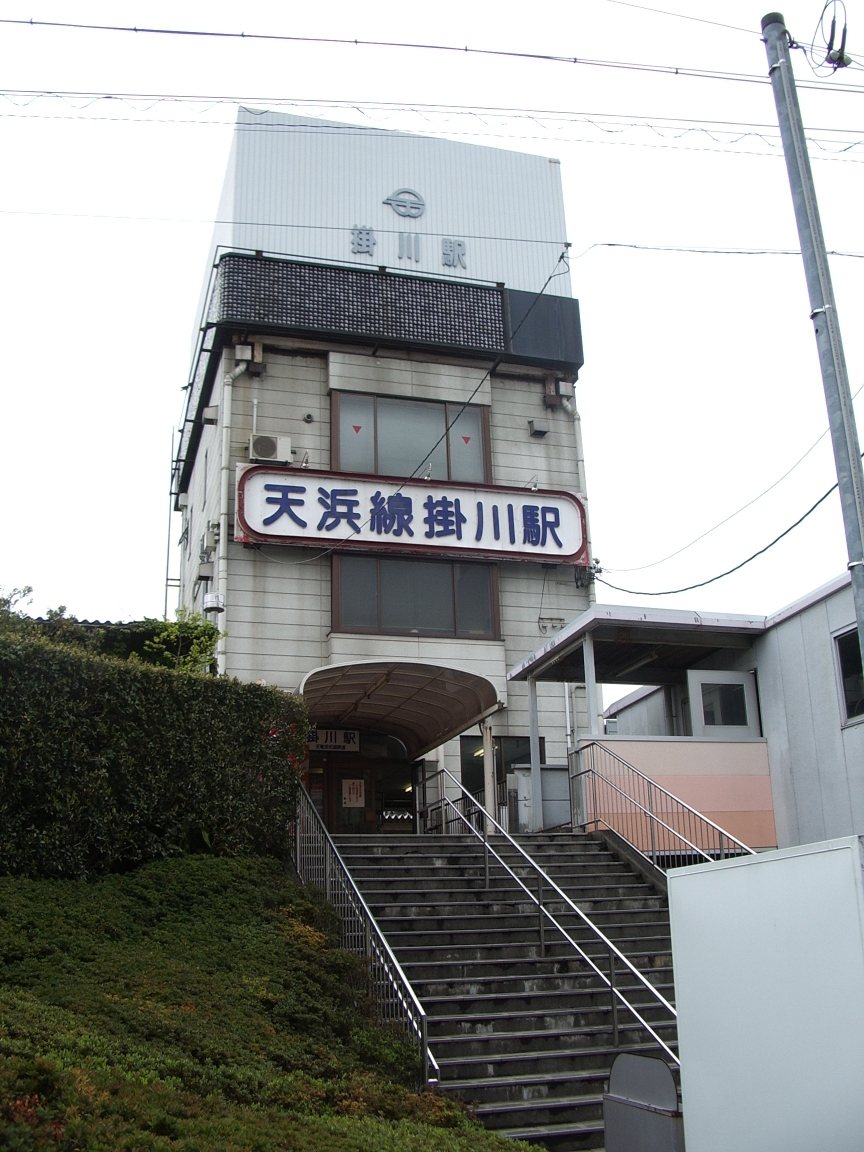
Tenryū Hamanako Kakegawa Station

Transfer is available from the JR line to the Tenryū Hamanako Line, whose terminus bay platform is in a separate building adjacent to the north exit of the JR station.

1・2	■ Tenryū-Hamanako Railway	Tenryū Futamata Station・Shinjohara Station

== Adjacent stations ==
«	Service	»
Tōkaidō Main Line
Kikugawa	Local	Aino
Kikugawa	Home Liner	Fukuroi
Tenryū Hamanako Line
Terminus	-	Kakegawa-shiyakusho-mae

== History ==
Kakegawa Station was first opened on April 16, 1889 when the section of the Tōkaidō Main Line connecting Shizuoka with Hamamatsu was completed. In 1935 the first section of the Tenryū Hamanako Line opened, with Kakegawa Station as its terminus. On March 13, 1988 the Tōkaidō Shinkansen platforms opened on the south side of the station.

Station numbering was introduced to the section of the Tōkaidō Line operated JR Central in March 2018; Kakegawa Station was assigned station number CA27.

== Passenger statistics ==
In fiscal 2017, the local portion of the station was used by an average of 11,292 passengers daily (boarding passengers only) and the Tenryū Hamanako portion was used by 995 passengers daily.

== Surrounding area ==
- Kakegawa Castle

== See also ==
- List of railway stations in Japan
