= Futagawa =

Futagawa (written: 二川 lit. "two rivers") is a Japanese surname. Notable people with the surname include:

- Buntarō Futagawa (二川 文太郎, 1899–1966), Japanese film director and writer
- Takahiro Futagawa (二川 孝広, born 1980), Japanese footballer

== See also ==
- Futagawa-juku (二川宿), a station of the Tōkaidō in Toyohashi, Aichi Prefecture, Japan
- Futagawa Station (二川駅, Futagawa-eki), a railway station in Toyohashi, Aichi Prefecture, Japan
