= Ōchiwatoge temple ruins =

- 大知波峠廃寺跡
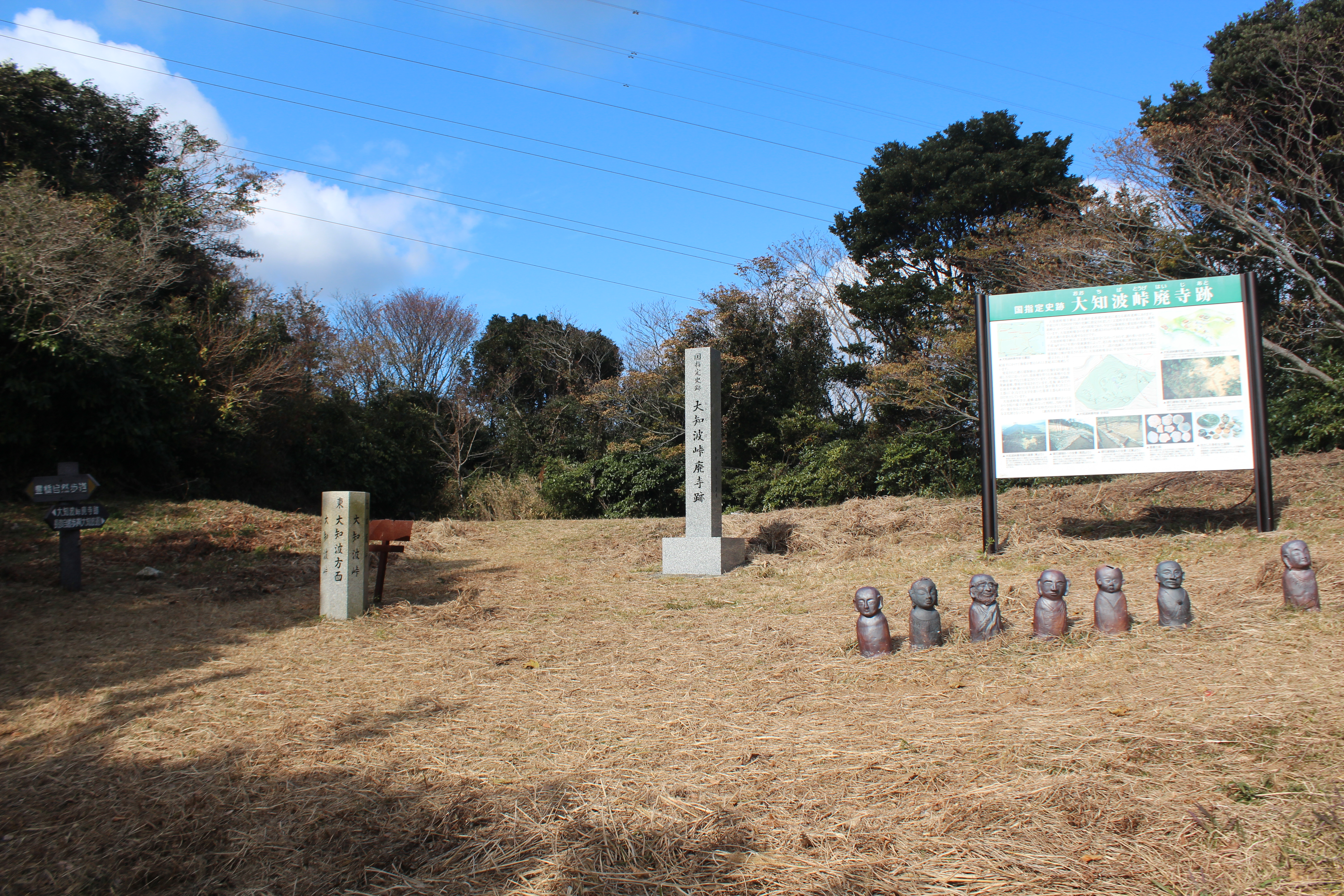
- Ōchiwatoge temple ruins

- Location within Shizuoka Prefecture Location within Japan

Religion
- Affiliation: Buddhist
- Status: ruins

Location
- Location: Kosai, Shizuoka
- Country: Japan
- Interactive map of Ōchiwatoge temple ruins
- Coordinates: 34°46′55.3″N 137°28′59.9″E

The Ōchiwatoge temple ruins (大知波峠廃寺跡, Ōchiwatoge haji ato) is an archaeological site with the ruins of a Heian period Buddhist temple located in the Ochiwa neighborhood of the city of Kosai, Shizuoka, Japan. The temple no longer exists, but the temple grounds were designated as a National Historic Site in 2001.

== Overview ==
The Ōchiwatoge temple ruins are located at an elevation of 340 meters in the Ōchiwa Pass which connects the city of Kosai in Shizuoka Prefecture with the city of Toyokawa in Aichi Prefecture, and overlooks Lake Hamana. The area is maintained as part of a hiking course today. It is approximately one hour 45 minutes on foot from Tenryū Hamanako Line Chibata Station.

The presence of ruins in the Ōchiwa Pass was known for many years; however, there was no mention of any settlement in literature, and the nature of these ruins was unknown. Starting in 1989, the Kosai City Board of Education conducted archaeological excavations for seven years, discovering the foundation of twelve buildings, remnants of a gardens with ponds, and monumental a gate, built in two terraces on the hillside. Of these building, five were clearly Buddhist temple structures, the largest of which was a 7x4 bay hall, with dimensions of 16 x 11 meters. Numerous pottery and ceramic shards were uncovered, including 445 examples with ink-painted inscriptions, from which the site could be dated from the 8th century through the end of the 11th century. From the inscriptions, it appears that this was either a Tendai or Shingon temple, and burnt soil and stones from the remains of the altar along with Haji ware pottery and glazed pottery indicate that esoteric Buddhist ceremonies using fire were performed. The ruins of other buildings are thought to be residential facilities for the monks are located to the east of the ruins of the pond. A small Jizō-dō chapel was erected on top of the earlier ruins in the latter half of the 12th century.

With the introduction of esoteric Buddhism in the early Heian period, temples such as Enryaku-ji and Kongōbu-ji appeared in the mountainous areas of the Kinki region, and with the spread and penetration of Buddhist culture into the regions, temples such as Yama-dera in Yamagata, Enichi-ji in Fukushima, and others were built in the mountains of other areas. The Ōchiwatoge temple appears to be one of temples that emerged during this period.

The site has been backfilled, and there are no ruins visible today.

== See also ==
- List of Historic Sites of Japan (Shizuoka)
