= Suzuki Alto Lapin =

Kei hatchback produced by Suzuki

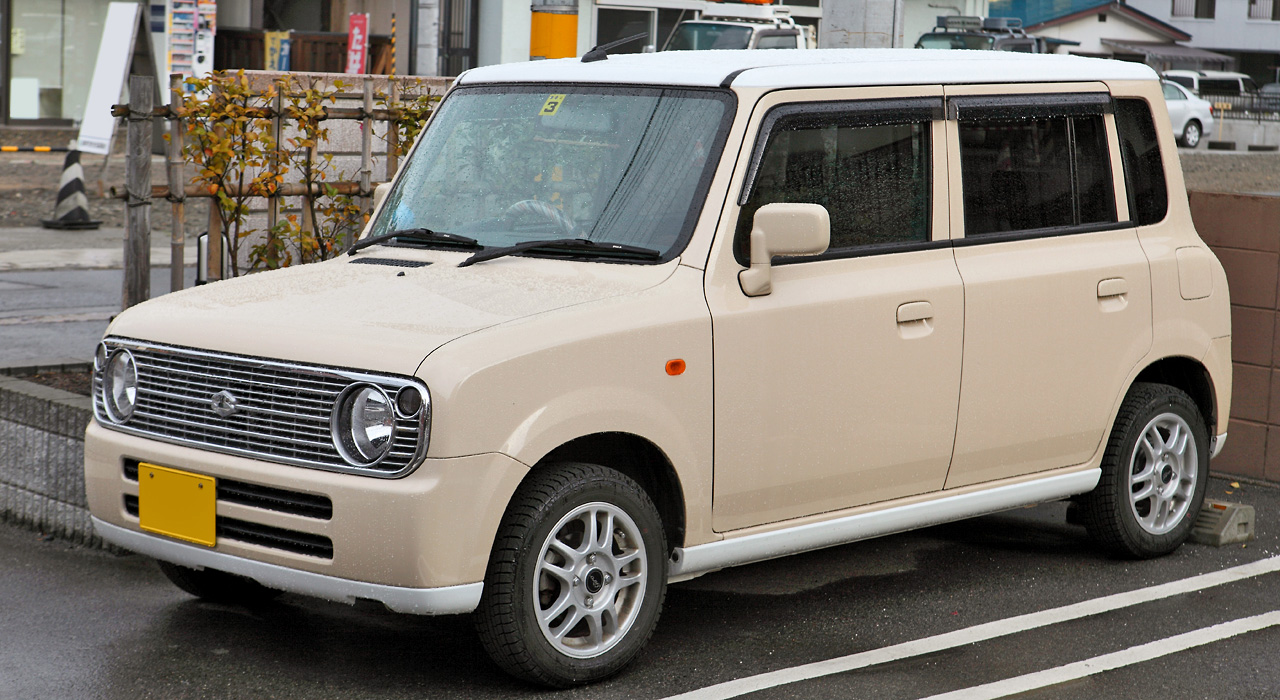

Overview
- Manufacturer: Suzuki
- Also called: Mazda Spiano (first generation only)
- Production: 2002–present; 2002–2008 (Mazda Spiano)
- Assembly: Japan: Kosai, Shizuoka

Body and chassis
- Class: Kei car
- Body style: 5-door hatchback
- Layout: Front-engine, front-wheel-drive Front-engine, four-wheel-drive
- Related: Suzuki Alto; Suzuki Wagon R

The Suzuki Alto Lapin (Japanese: スズキ アルト ラパン, Hepburn: Suzuki Aruto Rapan) (or simply called Suzuki Lapin) is a kei car with a five-door hatchback body, manufactured since 2002 by Suzuki for the Japanese market only, and it is based on Suzuki's popular Alto kei car.

The name "Lapin" stems from the French word for "rabbit". Lapins do not carry the Suzuki "S" emblem; instead they feature rabbit-head badging in the front grille, and a chromed Lapin logo on the rear.

== Overview ==
The prototype was unveiled at 2001 Tokyo Motor Show as the Suzuki Lapin. The Lapin's distinctive, boxy shape, proved popular with female buyers. In the development of the third generation, the majority of users are young women aged between 20 and 30 years.

The Alto Lapin was awarded the 2008 Japanese Good Design Award.

The first generation Alto Lapin was also marketed by Mazda as Mazda Spiano under an OEM agreement through their Autozam dealerships until 2008. The Mazda version has differences concerning some styling details, including a different front end.

== First-generation (HE21S; 2002–2008) ==
First Generation
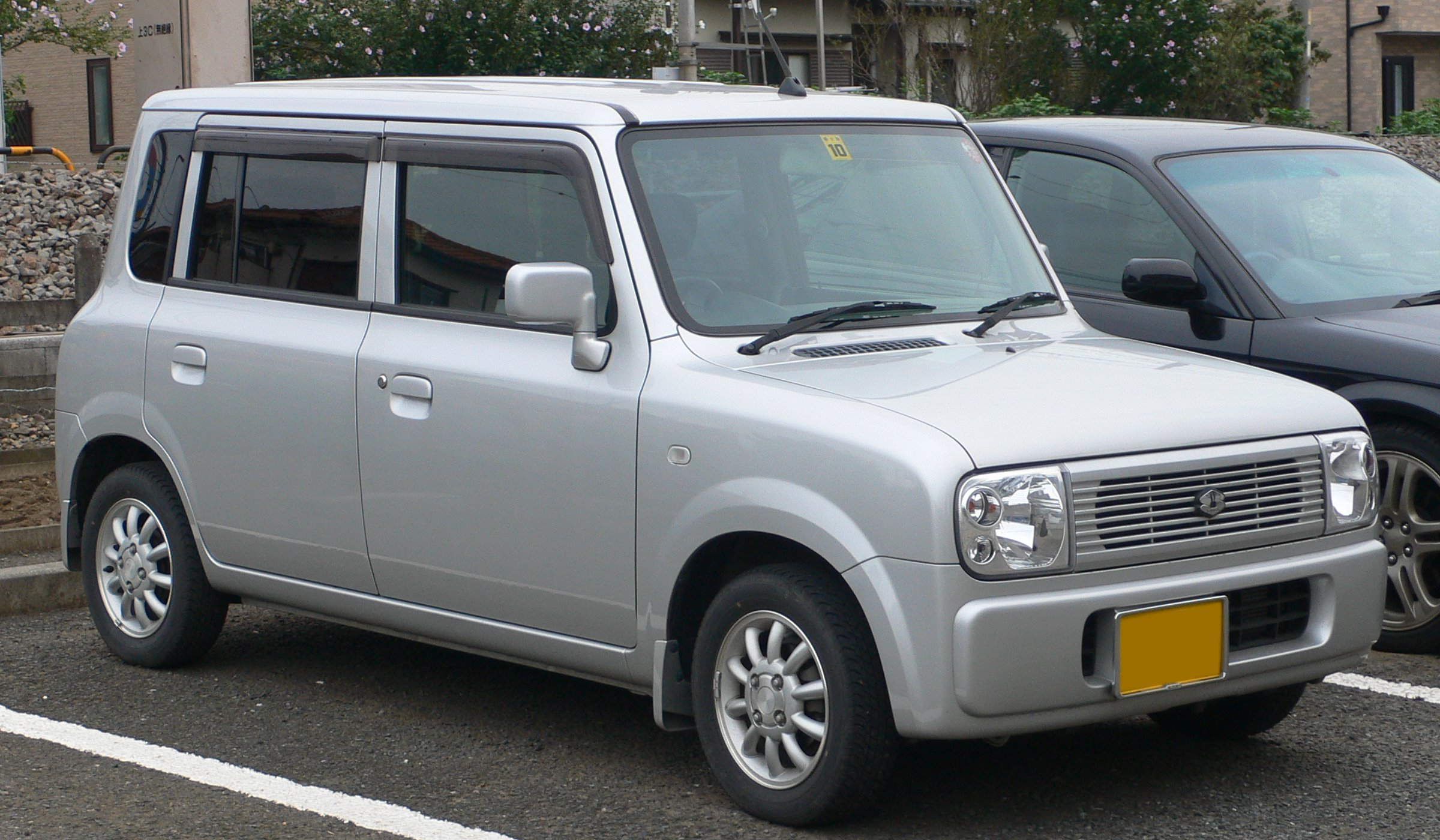

Overview
- Manufacturer: Suzuki
- Also called: Mazda Spiano
- Production: January 2002 – October 2008
- Assembly: Japan: Kosai, Shizuoka

Body and chassis
- Body style: 5-door hatchback
- Layout: Front-engine, front-wheel-drive Front-engine, four-wheel-drive
- Related: Suzuki MR Wagon

Powertrain
- Engine: 657 cc K6A I3; 657 cc K6A turbo I3
- Power output: 40 kW (54 PS; 54 hp) (naturally aspirated); 44 kW (60 PS; 59 hp) (turbocharged)
- Transmission: 4-speed automatic; 5-speed manual; CVT

Dimensions
- Wheelbase: 2,360 mm (92.9 in)
- Length: 3,395 mm (133.7 in)
- Width: 1,475 mm (58.1 in)
- Height: 1,495–1,505 mm (58.9–59.3 in)
- Curb weight: 780–850 kg (1,720–1,874 lb)

The first-generation Alto Lapin was introduced on 22 January 2002 with four trims, G, X, Z, and X2. The top grade X2 feature a two-tone colour. The car is powered by the Suzuki's K6A kei car engine, 0.66 L naturally aspirated, 54 PS (40 kW) with either front-wheel drive or all-wheel drive. All grades were paired by a four-speed automatic transmission.

- In October 2002, Suzuki launched the "Turbo". It has a turbocharged 60 PS (44 kW) motor and a 5-speed manual option.
- In February 2003, a canvas top version was available. Only available in 4-speed automatic option.
- In September 2003, the series II model was introduced and two new versions "SS" and "L" were added. The SS features a sportier design, round headlights, and MOMO steering wheel.
- In October 2004, the series III model was introduced and "L" discontinued.
- In December 2005, the series IV model was introduced and the canvas top version was discontinued.
- In April 2006, the series V model introduced and round-shape headlamps "L" added. The X2 grade was discontinued.
- In May 2007, the series VI model introduced and received new shape front grille.
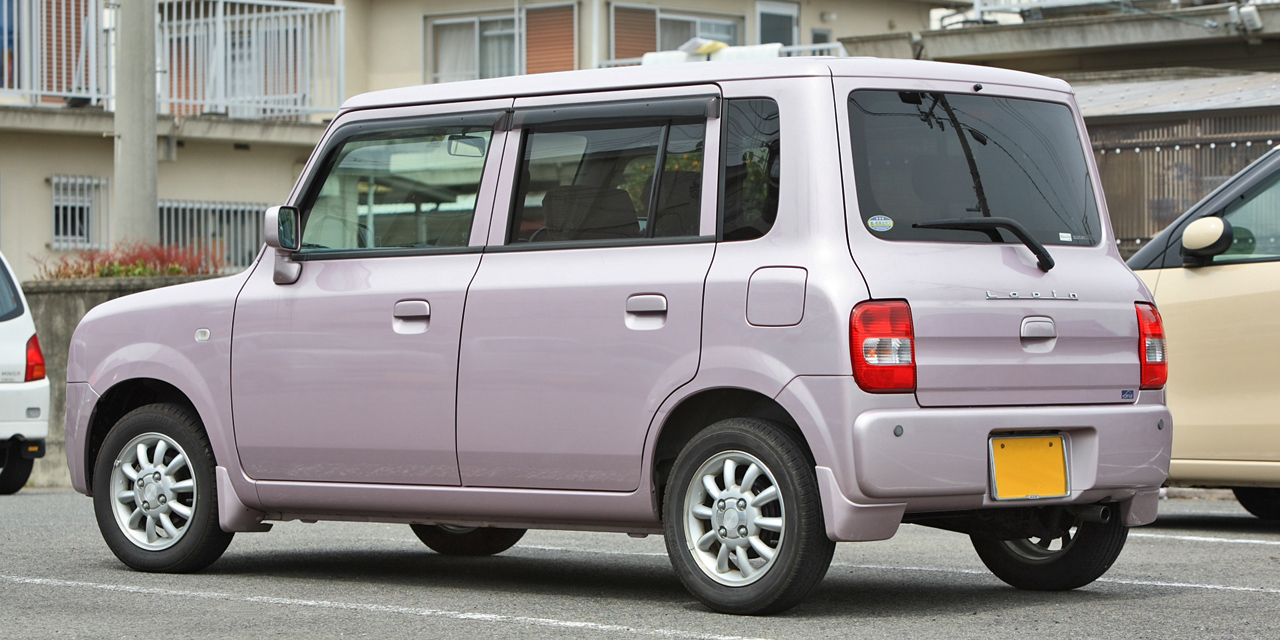
Rear view

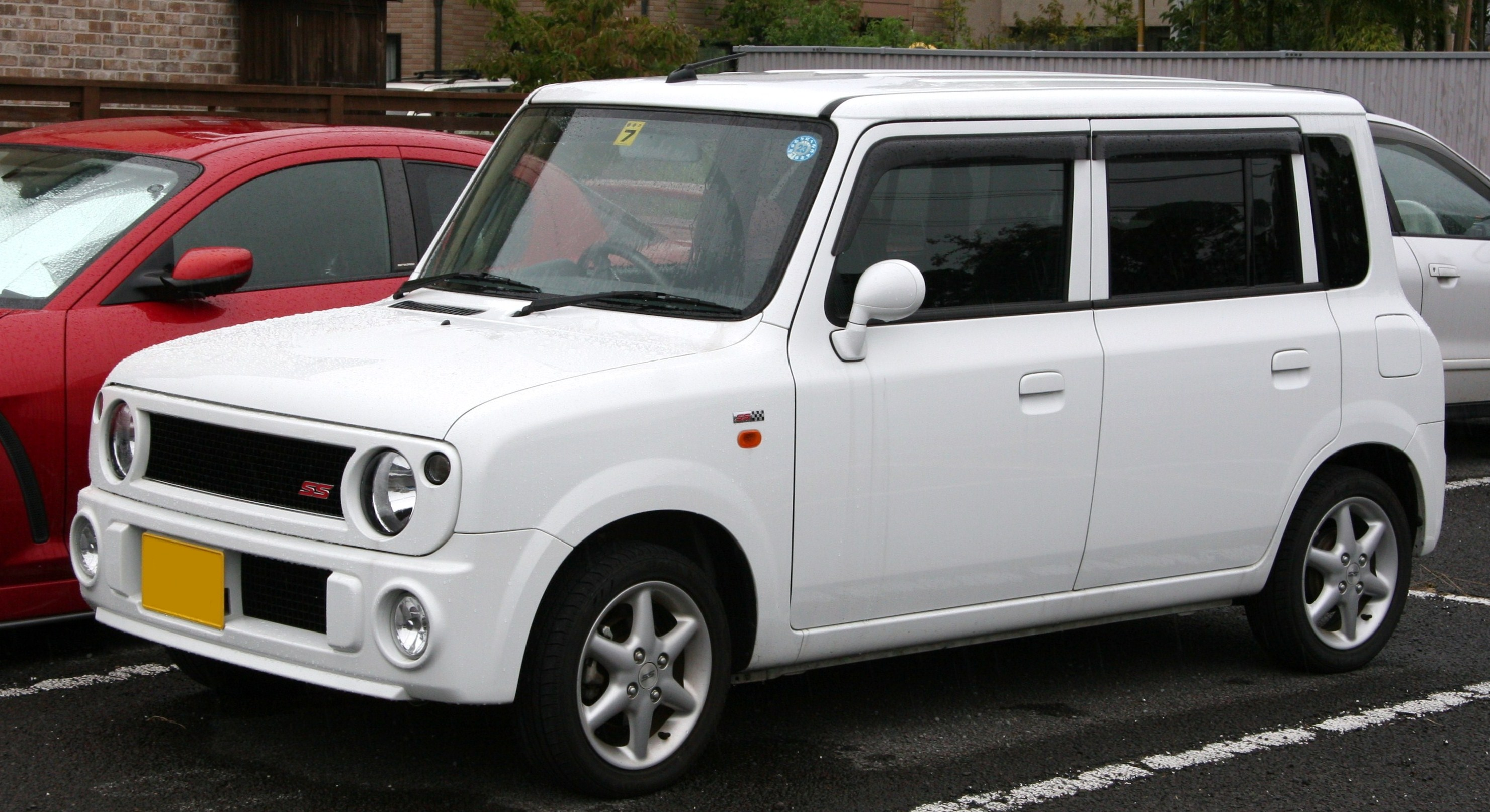
Suzuki Alto Lapin SS

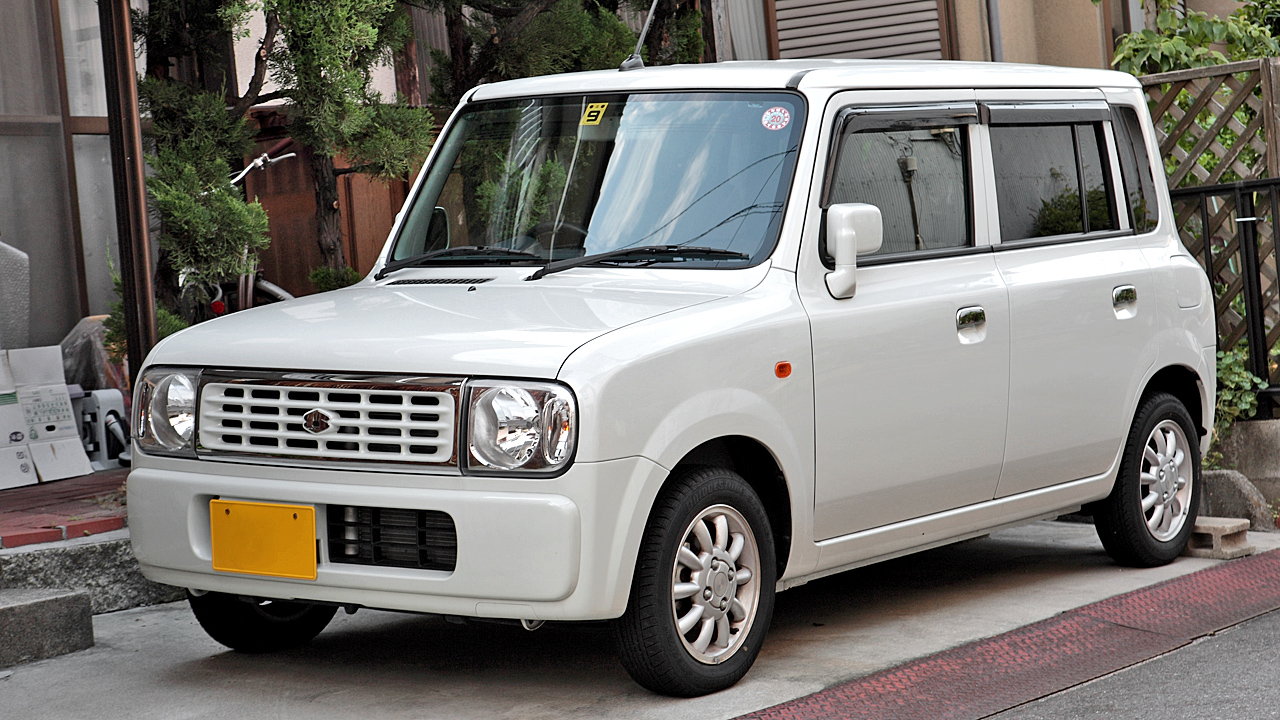
2007 facelift

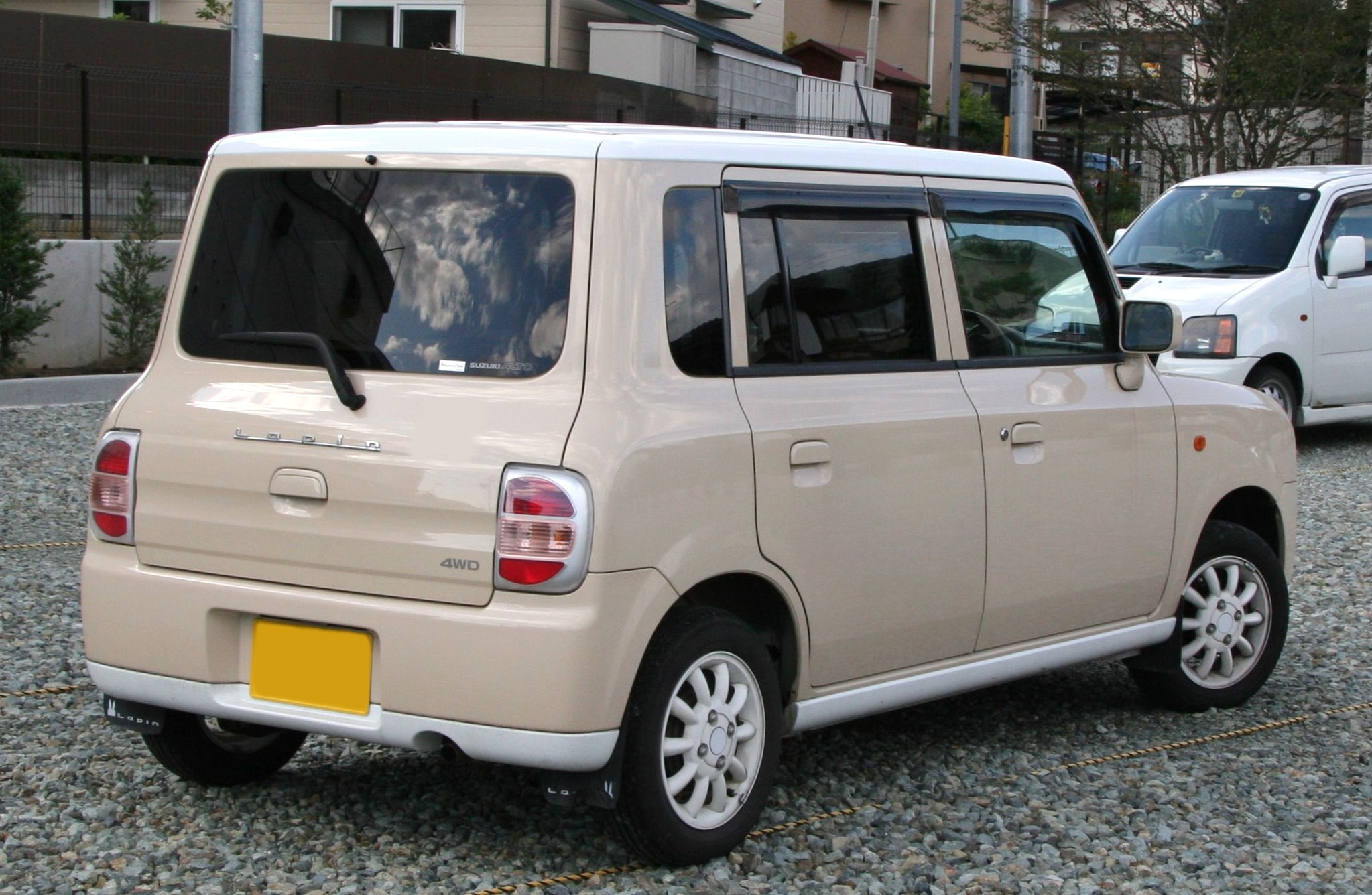
Facelift rear view

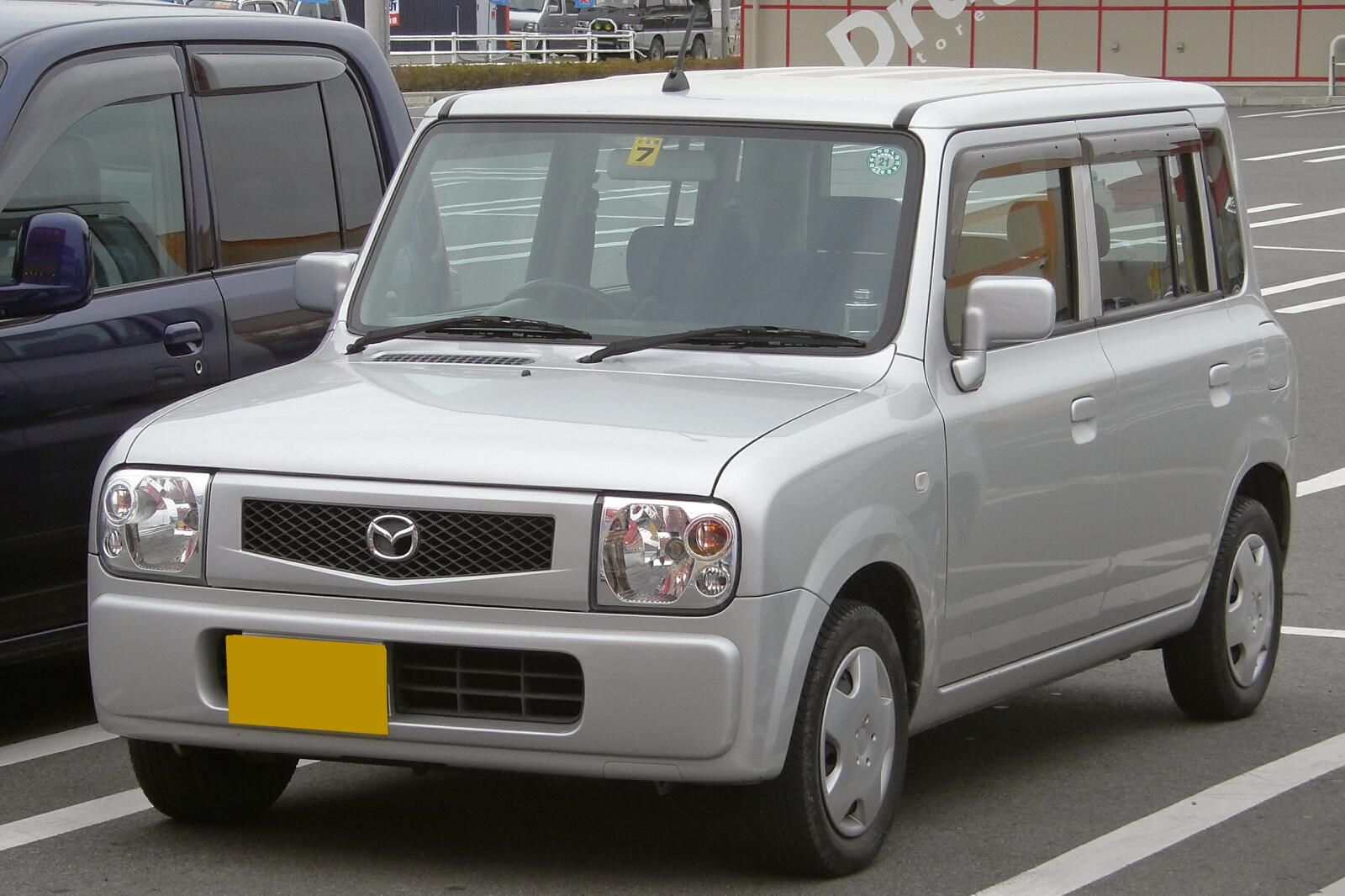
Mazda Spiano

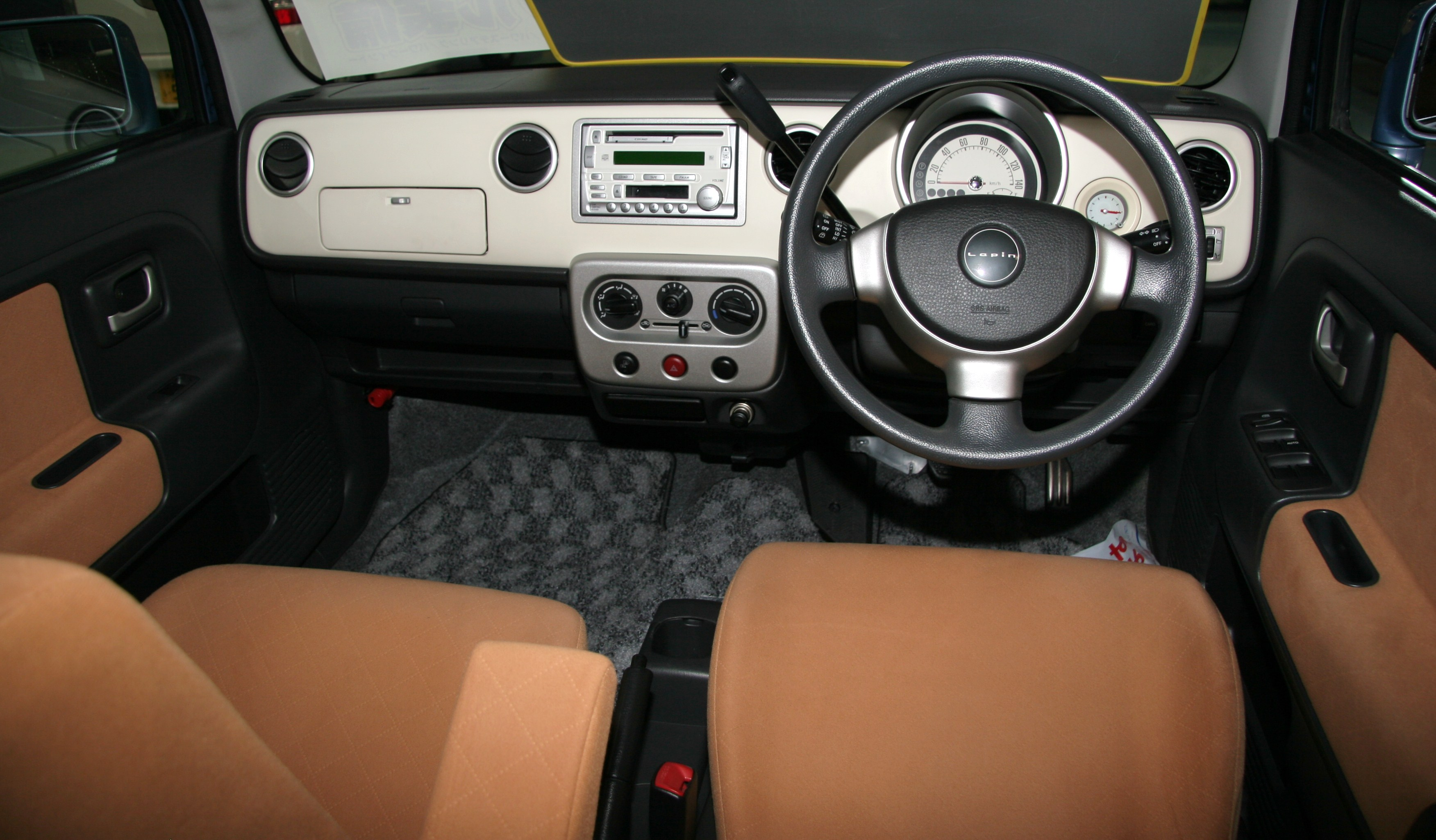
Interior

== Second-generation (HE22S; 2008–2015) ==
Second Generation
- Alto Lapin X

Overview
- Manufacturer: Suzuki
- Production: November 2008 – May 2015
- Assembly: Japan: Kosai, Shizuoka

Body and chassis
- Body style: 5-door hatchback
- Layout: Front-engine, front-wheel-drive Front-engine, four-wheel-drive

Powertrain
- Engine: 657 cc K6A I3; 657 cc K6A turbo I3
- Transmission: 4-speed automatic; CVT

Dimensions
- Wheelbase: 2,400 mm (94.5 in)
- Length: 3,395 mm (133.7 in)
- Width: 1,475 mm (58.1 in)
- Height: 1,495–1,510 mm (58.9–59.4 in)
- Curb weight: 790–870 kg (1,742–1,918 lb)

The second-generation Alto Lapin was introduced in November 2008 with four trims: "G", "X", "T" and "T L package". CVT was added and manual transmission was dropped. Unlike its predecessor, there is no longer a Mazda Spiano counterpart.

- In May 2010, all models got CVT and a four-speed auto was discontinued.
- In August 2010, the series II model was introduced.
- In May 2012, the series III model was introduced.
- In June 2013, the Lapin Chocolat G features a round headlights and taillights was added. In October the same year, the Chocolat G received the Good Design Award.
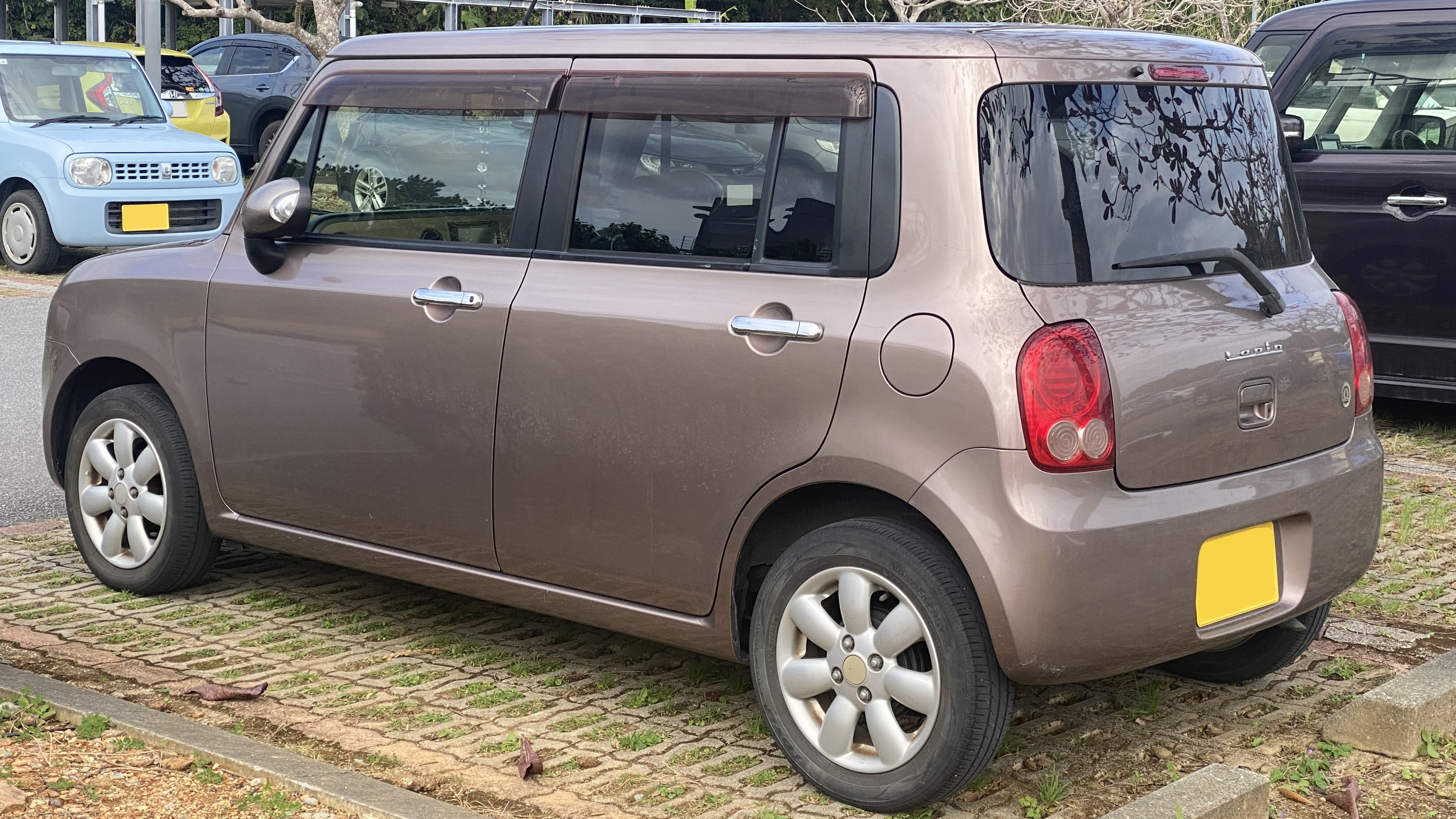
Rear view

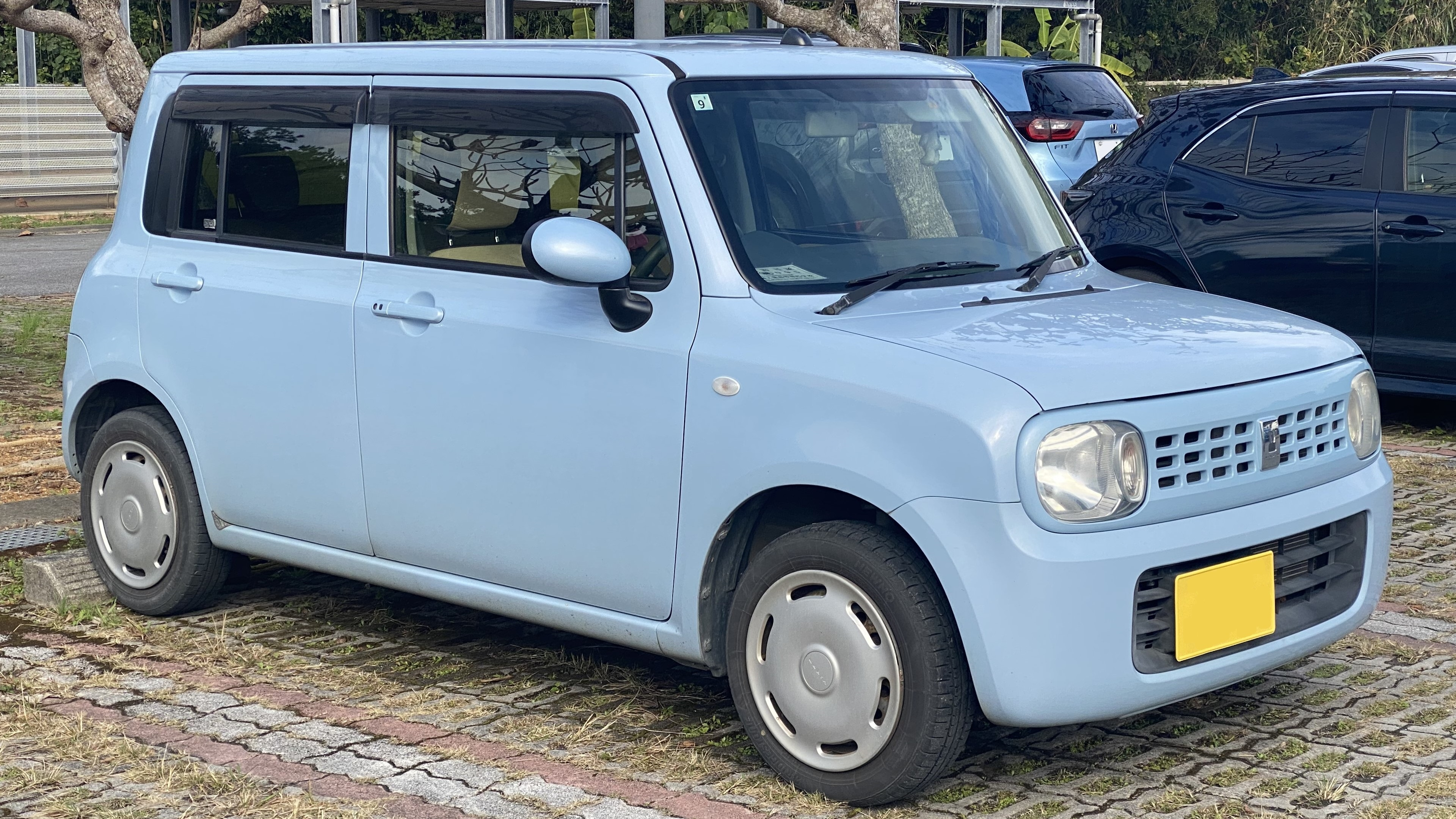
Suzuki Alto Lapin G

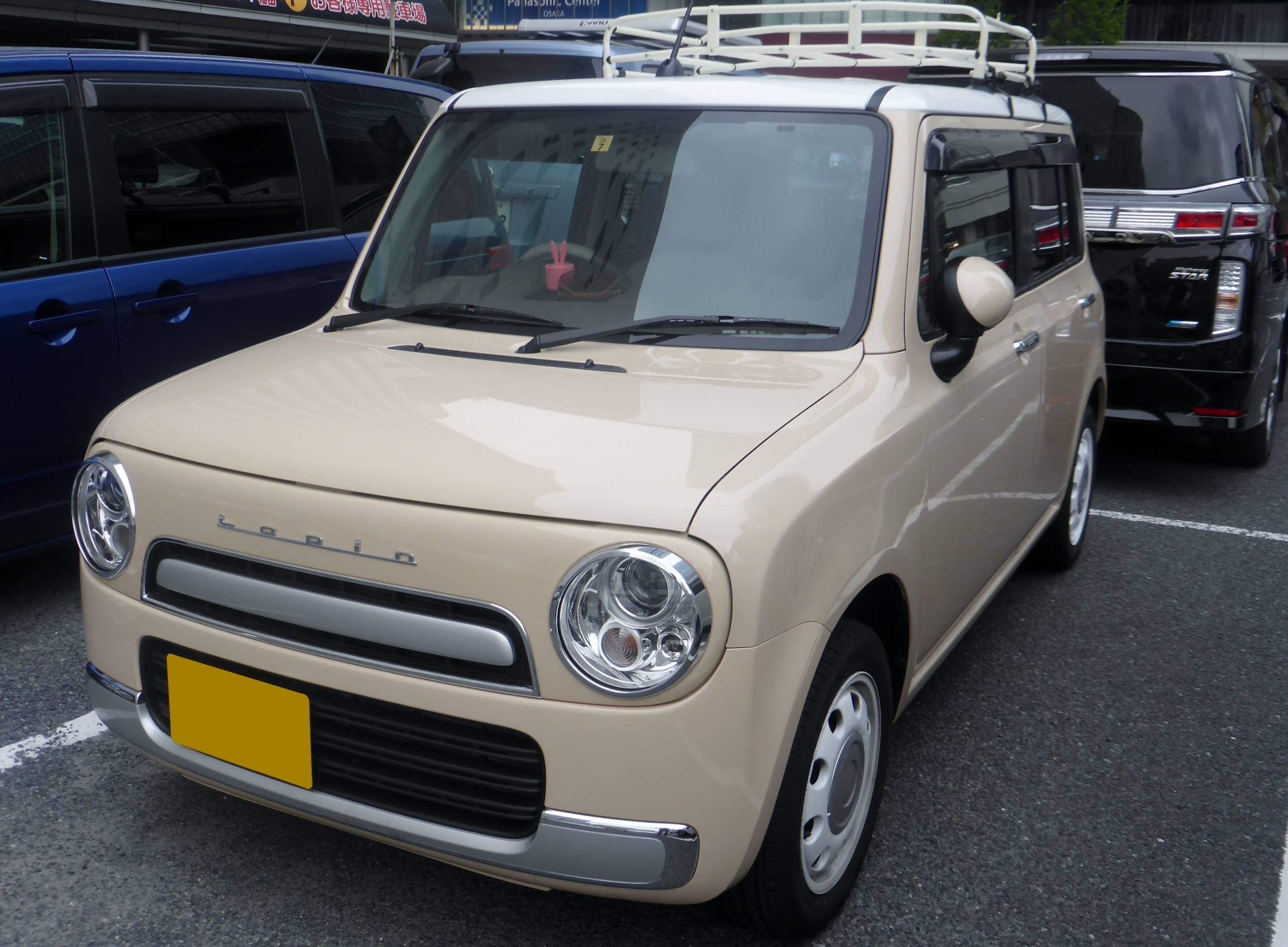
Alto Lapin Chocolat G

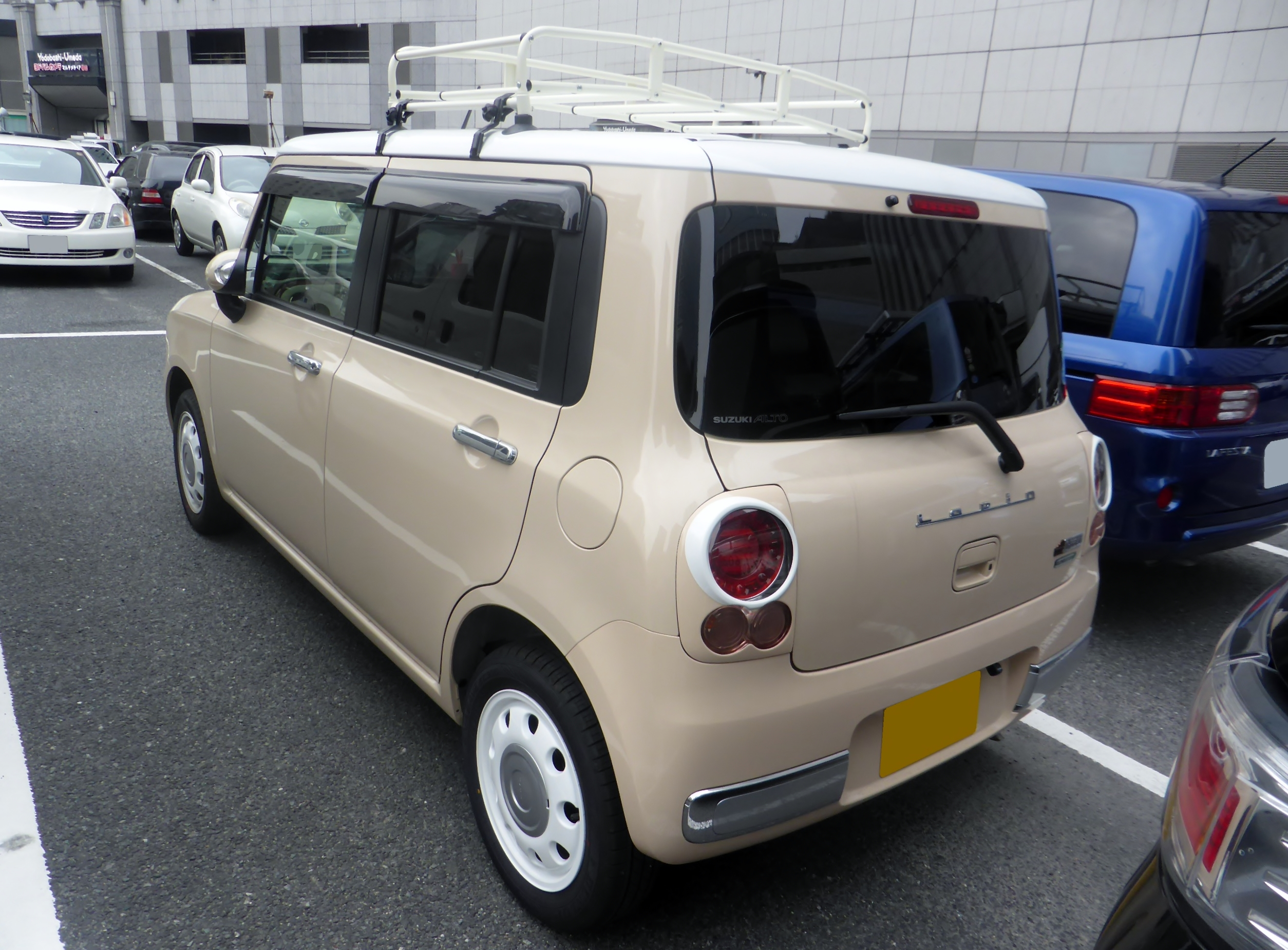
Alto Lapin Chocolat G

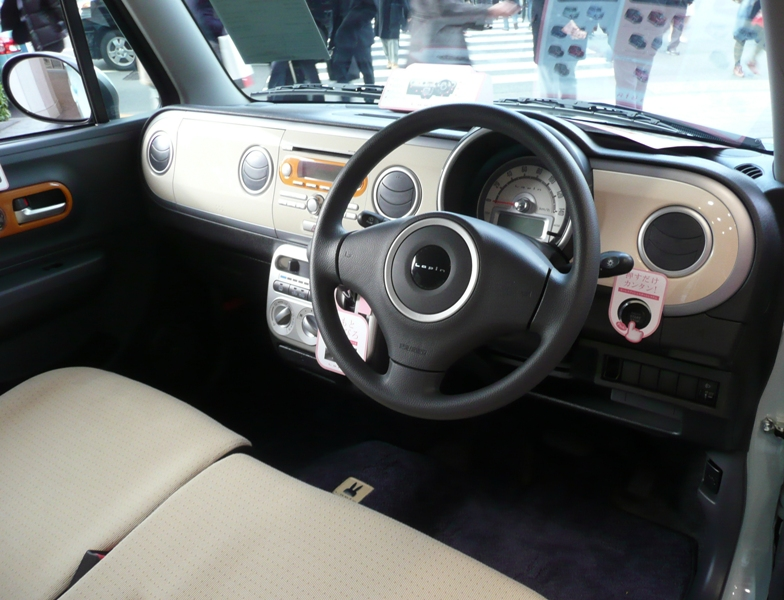
Interior

== Third-generation (HE33S/HE93S; 2015–present) ==
Third Generation
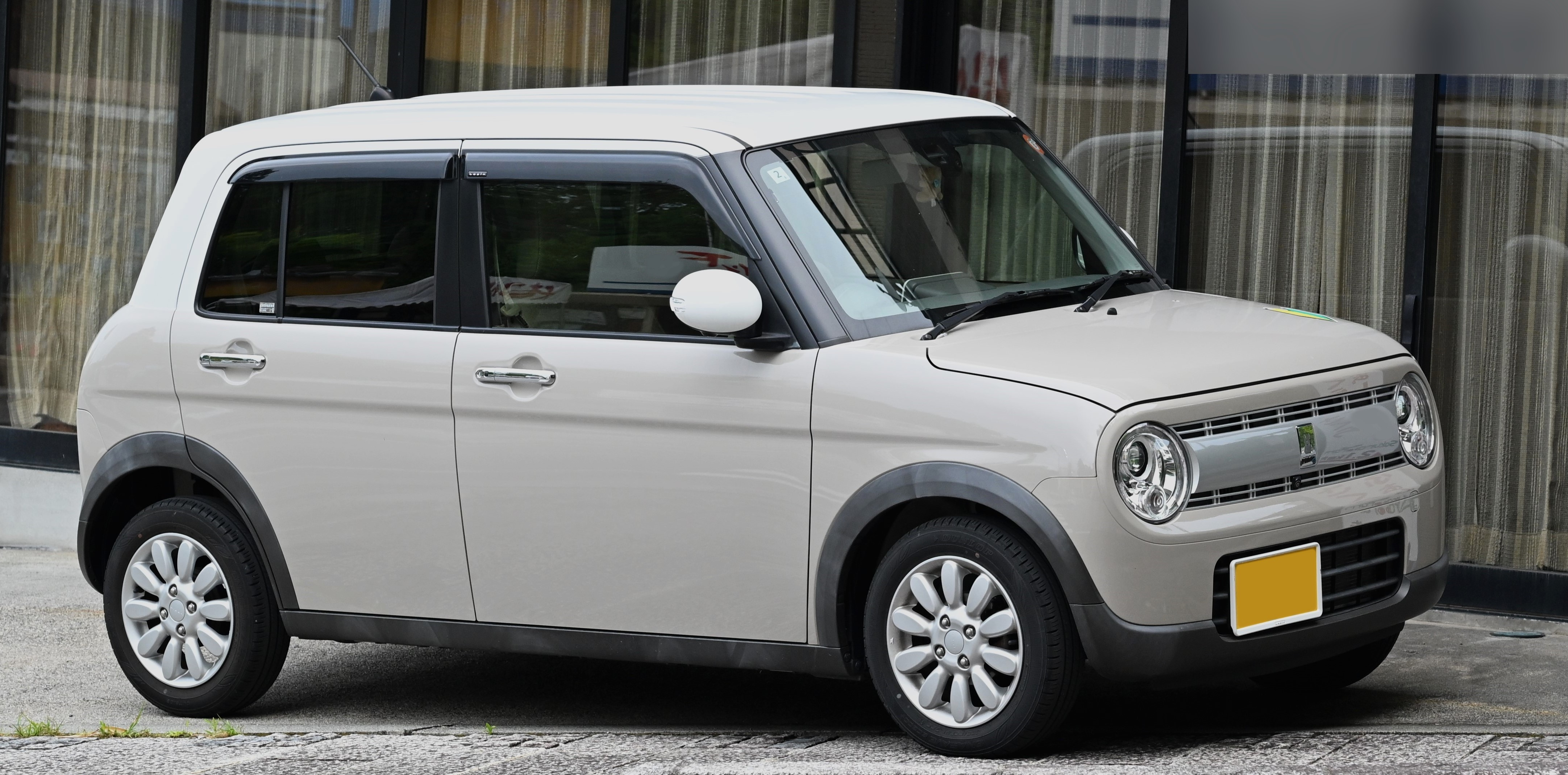

Overview
- Manufacturer: Suzuki
- Production: June 2015 – present
- Assembly: Japan: Kosai, Shizuoka

Body and chassis
- Body style: 5-door hatchback
- Layout: Front-engine, front-wheel-drive; Front-engine, four-wheel-drive
- Platform: HEARTECT
- Related: Suzuki Alto; Suzuki Wagon R

Powertrain
- Engine: 658 cc R06A I3; 657 cc R06D I3; 657 cc R06D I3 mild hybrid
- Electric motor: 1.9 kW (2.6 PS) WA04C DC synchronous
- Transmission: 4-speed AGS automatic; CVT
- Hybrid drivetrain: mild hybrid (2025-present)

Dimensions
- Wheelbase: 2,460 mm (96.9 in)
- Length: 3,395 mm (133.7 in)
- Width: 1,475 mm (58.1 in)
- Height: 1,525 mm (60.0 in)
- Curb weight: 650–730 kg (1,433–1,609 lb)

The third-generation Alto Lapin was released on 3 June 2015.

A derivative model called Lapin LC was released on 17 June 2022; it features a redesigned front fascia inspired by the 1960s LC10 Fronte 360.

The facelift model was launched in June 2022, while the Lapin LC was received a facelift in 2025.

This retro-styled kei car is powered by a 660 cc petrol engine producing 52 PS (38 kW) and 60 N⋅m (44 lb⋅ft) of torque, paired with a continuously variable transmission (CVT). It is available in both front-wheel-drive and four-wheel-drive configurations. The Lapin LC measures 3,395 mm in length, 1,475 mm in width, and 1,525 mm in height, with a wheelbase of 2,460 mm. In its most efficient configuration, it achieves an average fuel consumption of up to 26.2 km/L.

In July 2025, a R06D mild hybrid version became available.

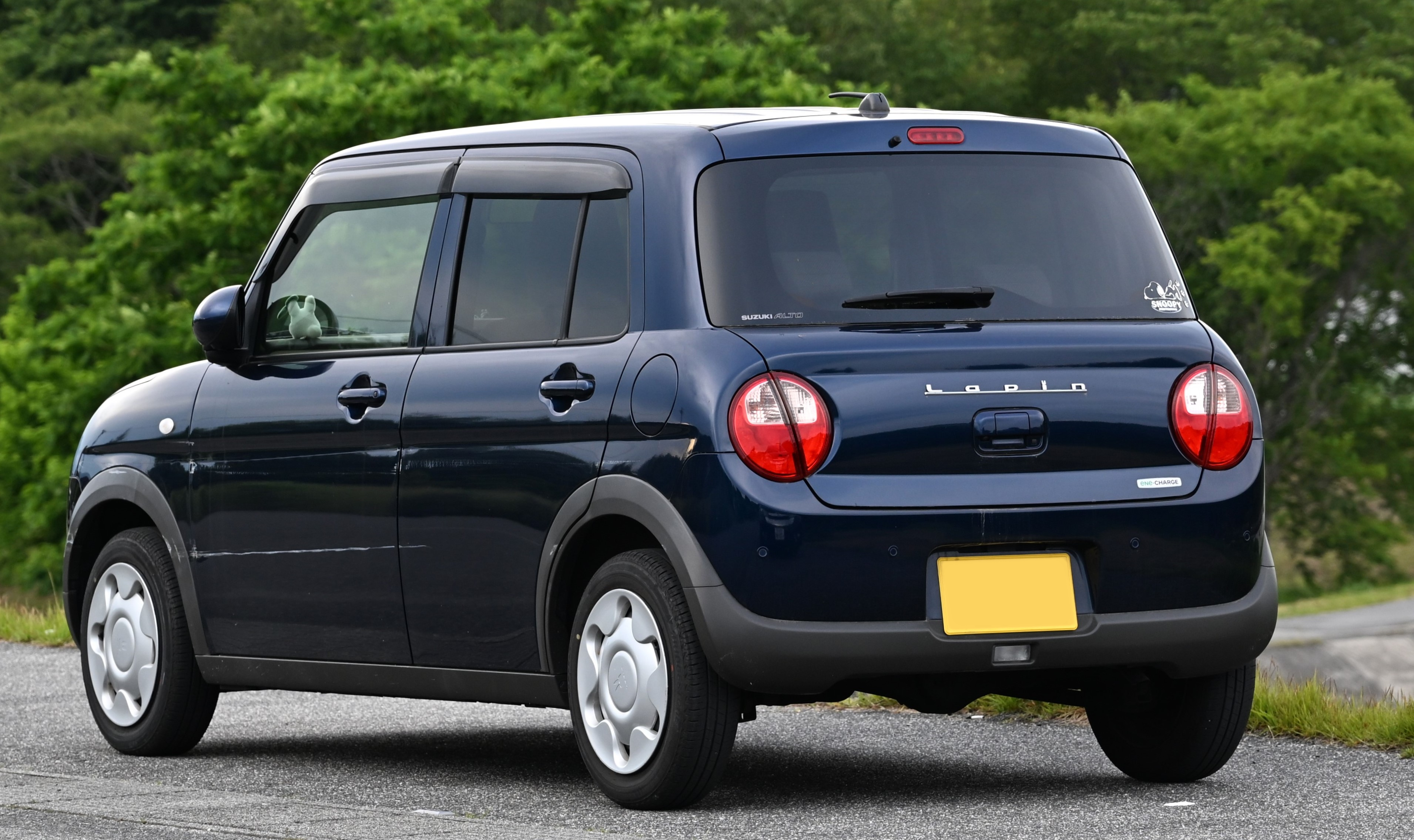
Rear view

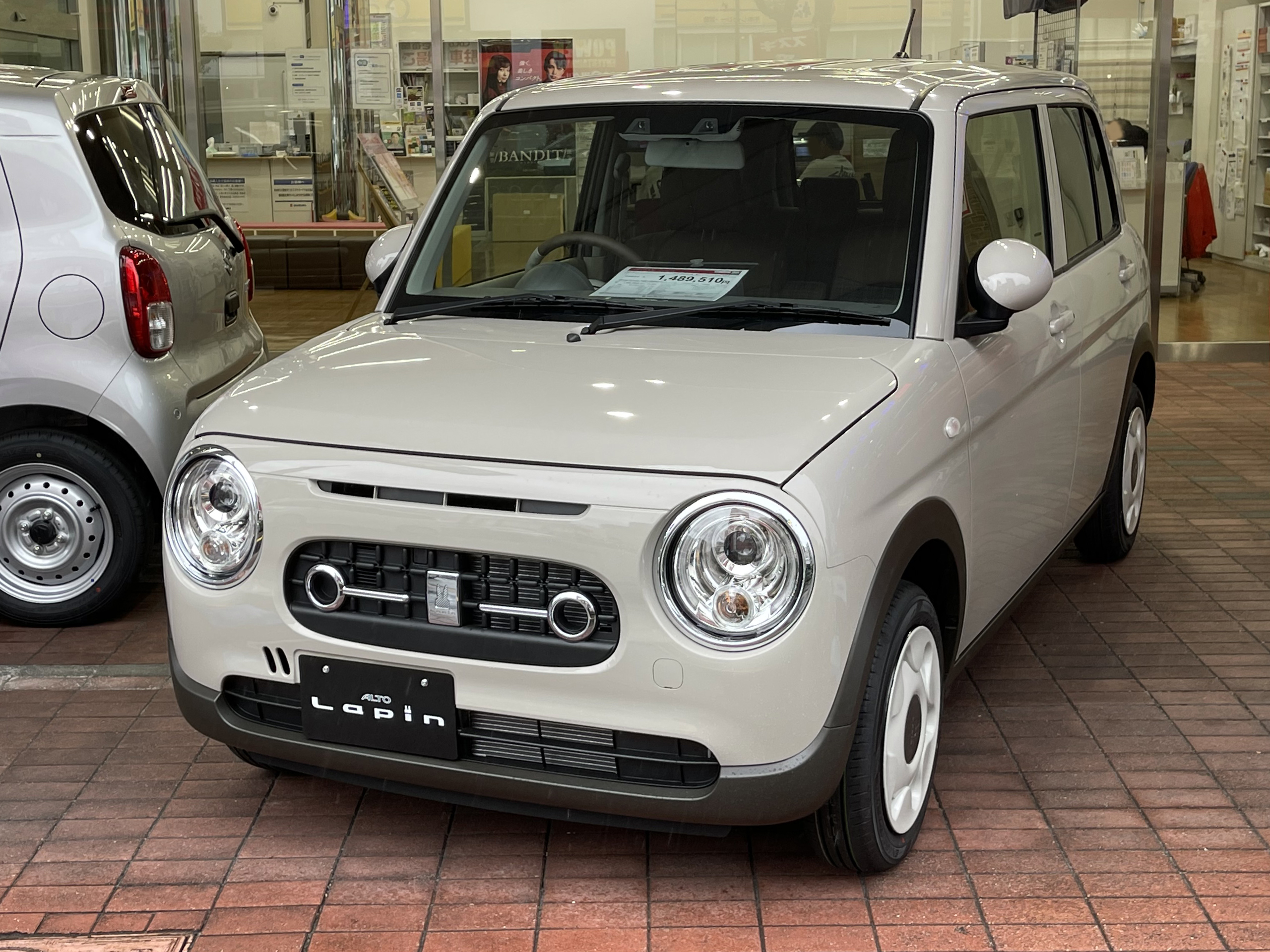
Suzuki Alto Lapin LC

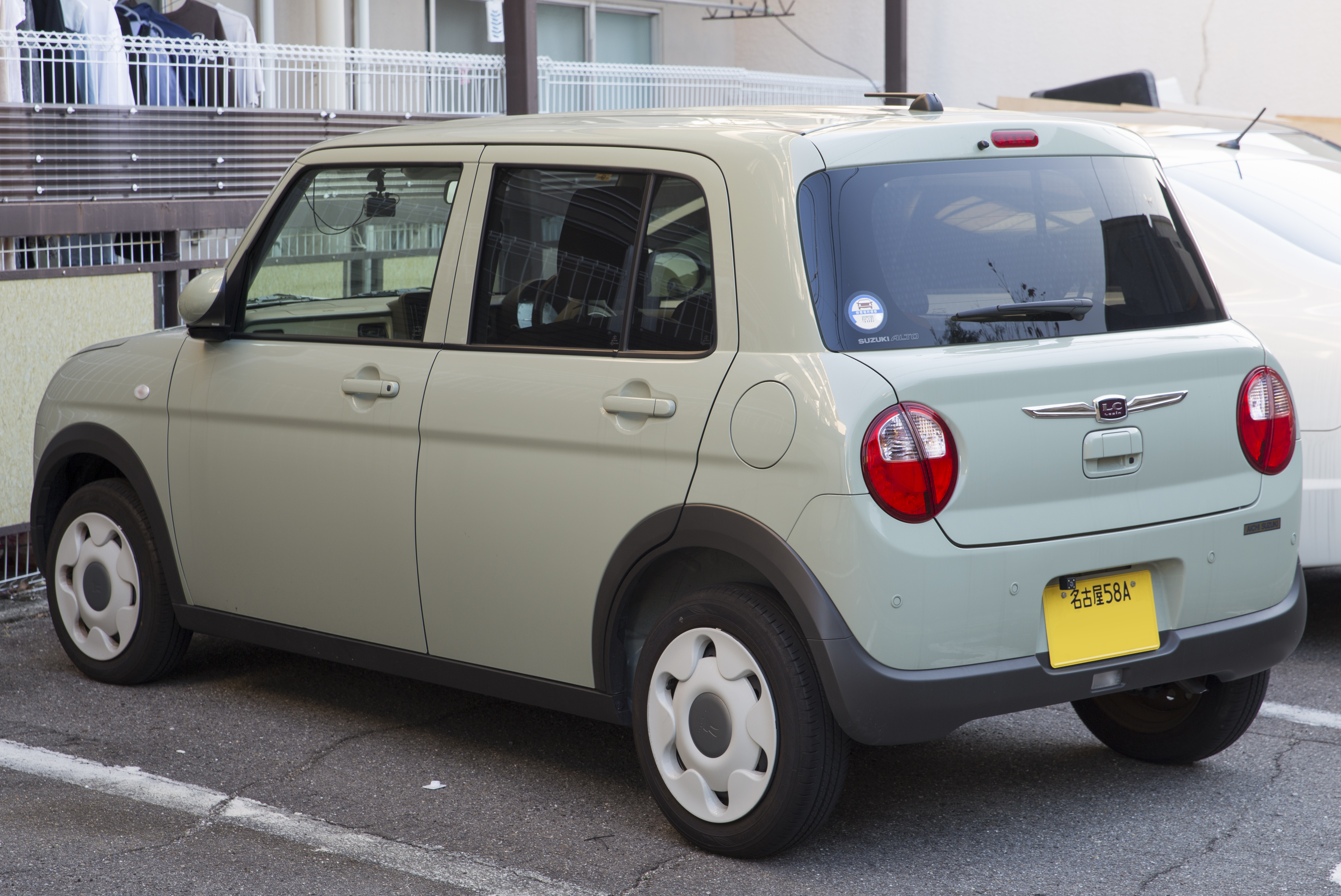
Lapin LC rear view, featuring the unique Lapin LC logo

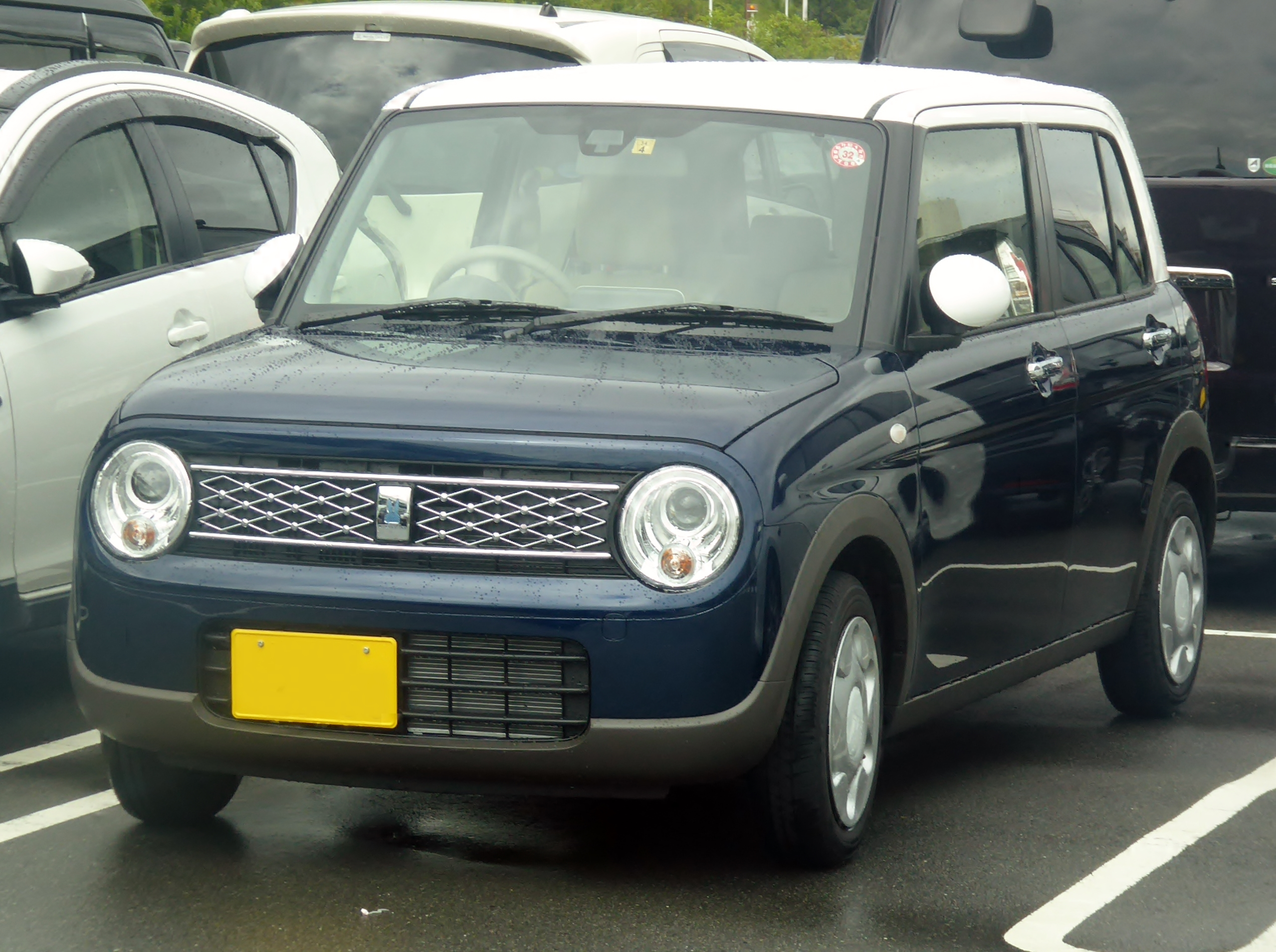
Suzuki Alto Lapin Mode

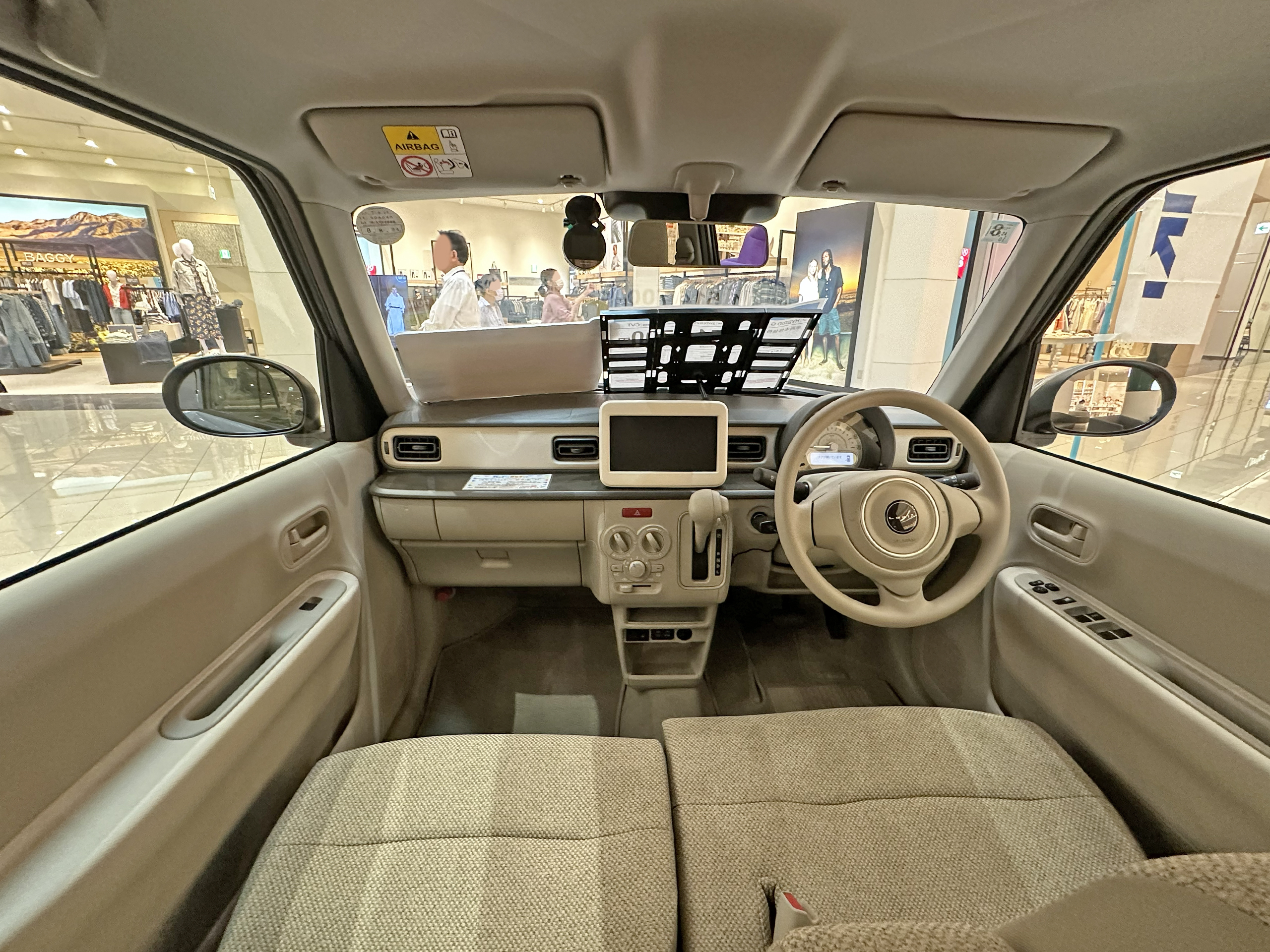
Interior

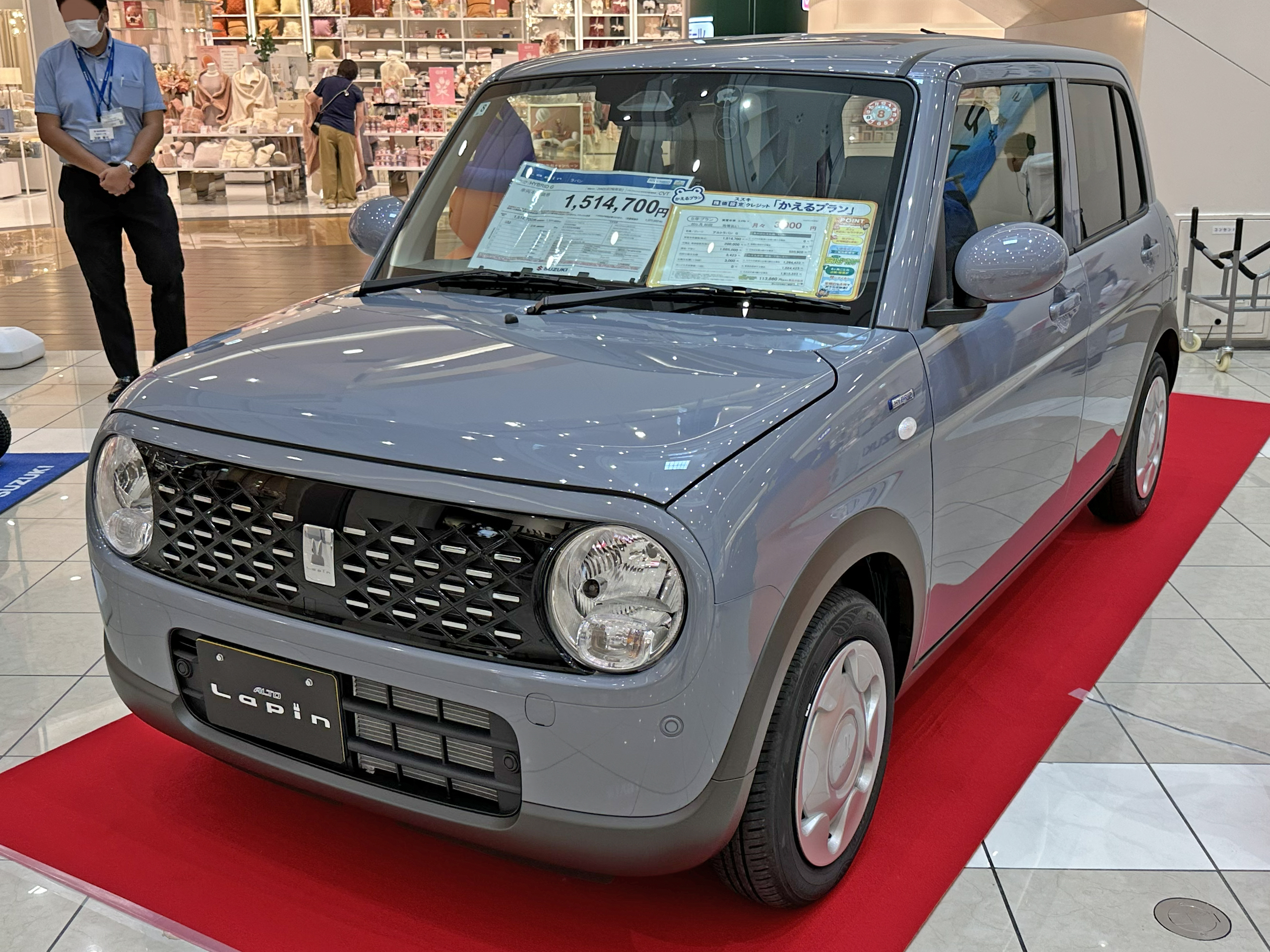
2022 Facelift

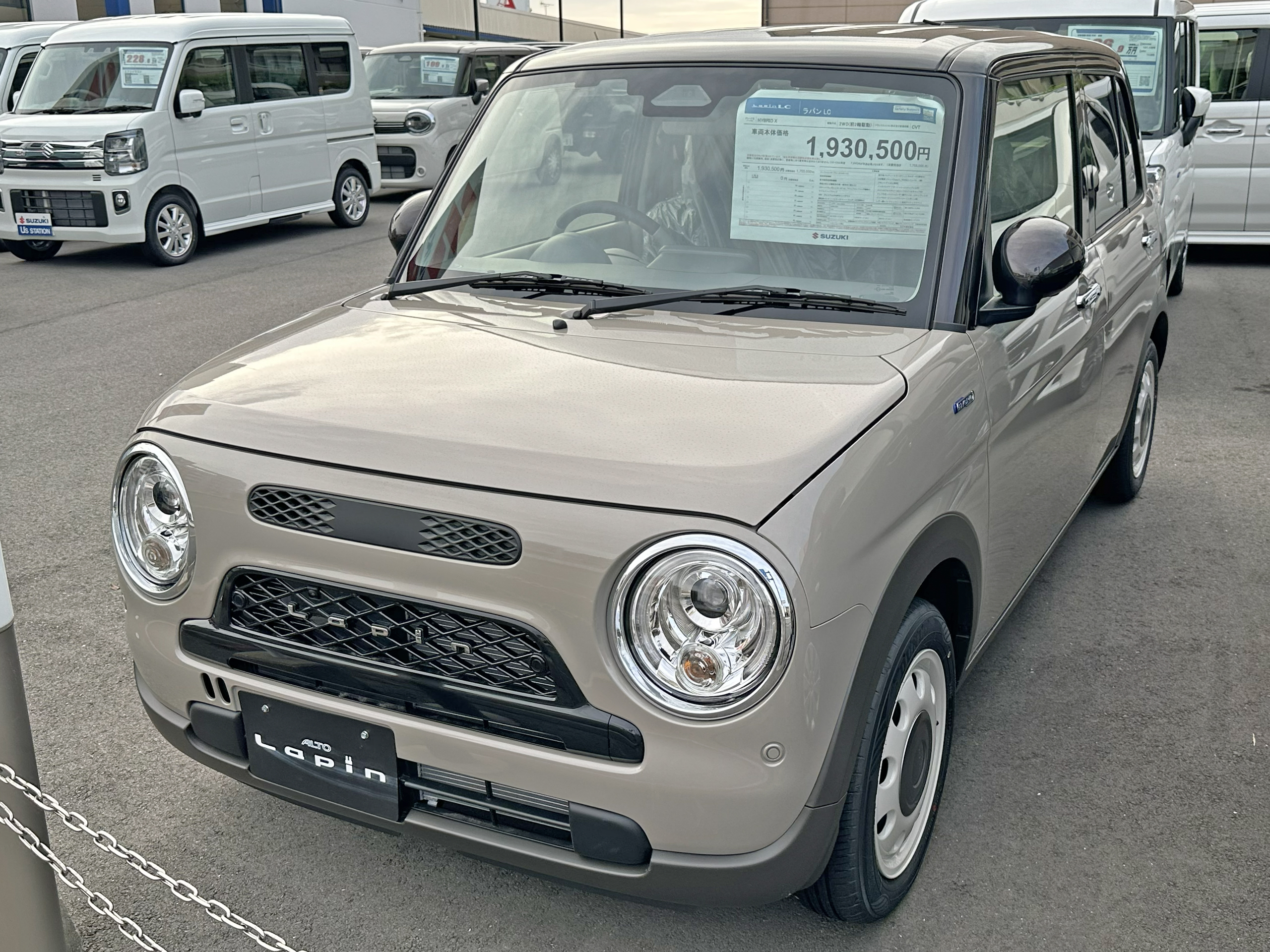
Alto Lapin LC facelift

== Sales ==
Year	Japan
2002	72,057
2003	85,040
2004	68,911
2005	55,806
2006	46,746
2007	31,391
2008	28,893
2009	40,947
2010	40,545
2011	32,178
2012	40,841
2013	43,181
2014	40,421
2015	35,905
2016	35,299
2017	30,161
2018	27,927
2019	26,546
2020	25,011
2021	25,865
2022	29,482
2023	28,268
2024	25,376
2025	27,939
