= Shirasuka-juku =

Thirty-second of the 53 stations of the Tōkaidō in Japan

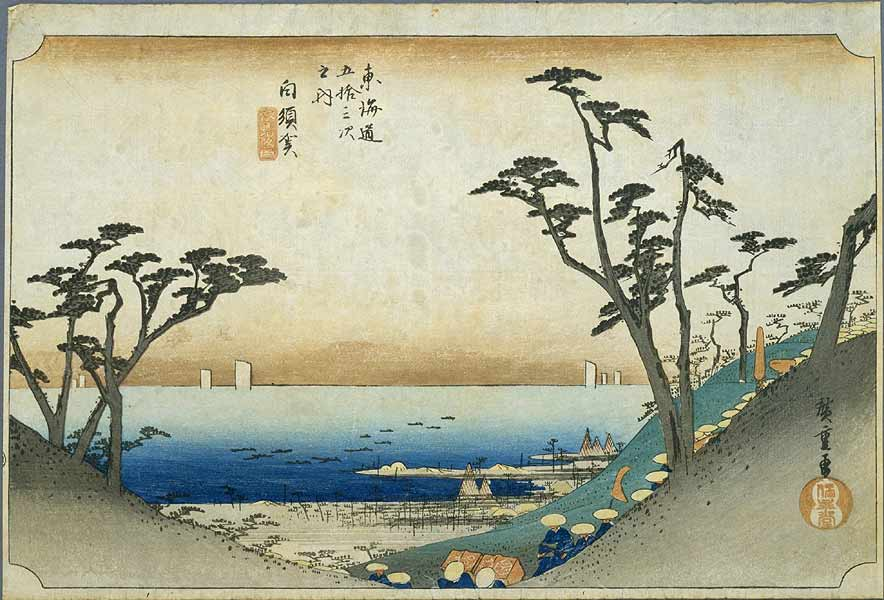
Shirasuka-juku in the 1830s, as depicted by Hiroshige in The Fifty-three Stations of the Tōkaidō

Shirasuka-juku (白須賀宿, Shirasuka-juku) was the thirty-second of the fifty-three stations of the Tōkaidō. It is located in Kosai, Shizuoka Prefecture, Japan. During the Edo period, it was the westernmost post station of Tōtōmi Province.

== History ==
Originally, Shirasuka-juku was located very close to the shore of the ocean. However, in the earthquake of 1707, the earthquake and its tsunami devastated the region. After that, the post station was moved to its present location on a plateau. Before the 1707 earthquake, it was recorded to have 27 inns for travelers, making it a middle-sized post station.

When the post station was decommissioned in 1889, it was replaced with the new town of Shirasuka, which later merged with the city of Kosai in 1955.

During the Meiji period, the Tōkaidō Main Line was established. However, the train line did not come through Kosai and major developments in the area were kept to a minimum. As a result, there are still a few areas with buildings from the Edo period in existence today. There is also a historical archives museum that was established to mark the 400th anniversary of the founding of the post station, with the purpose of expanding knowledge of the culture and history of the post station.

The classic ukiyo-e print by Andō Hiroshige (Hōeido edition) from 1831–1834 depicts a daimyō procession on sankin-kōtai, heading towards Edo from one of the domains in eastern Japan.

== Neighboring post towns ==
Tōkaidō
Arai-juku - Shirasuka-juku - Futagawa-juku
