= Kosai, Shizuoka =

Kosai 湖西市
- City
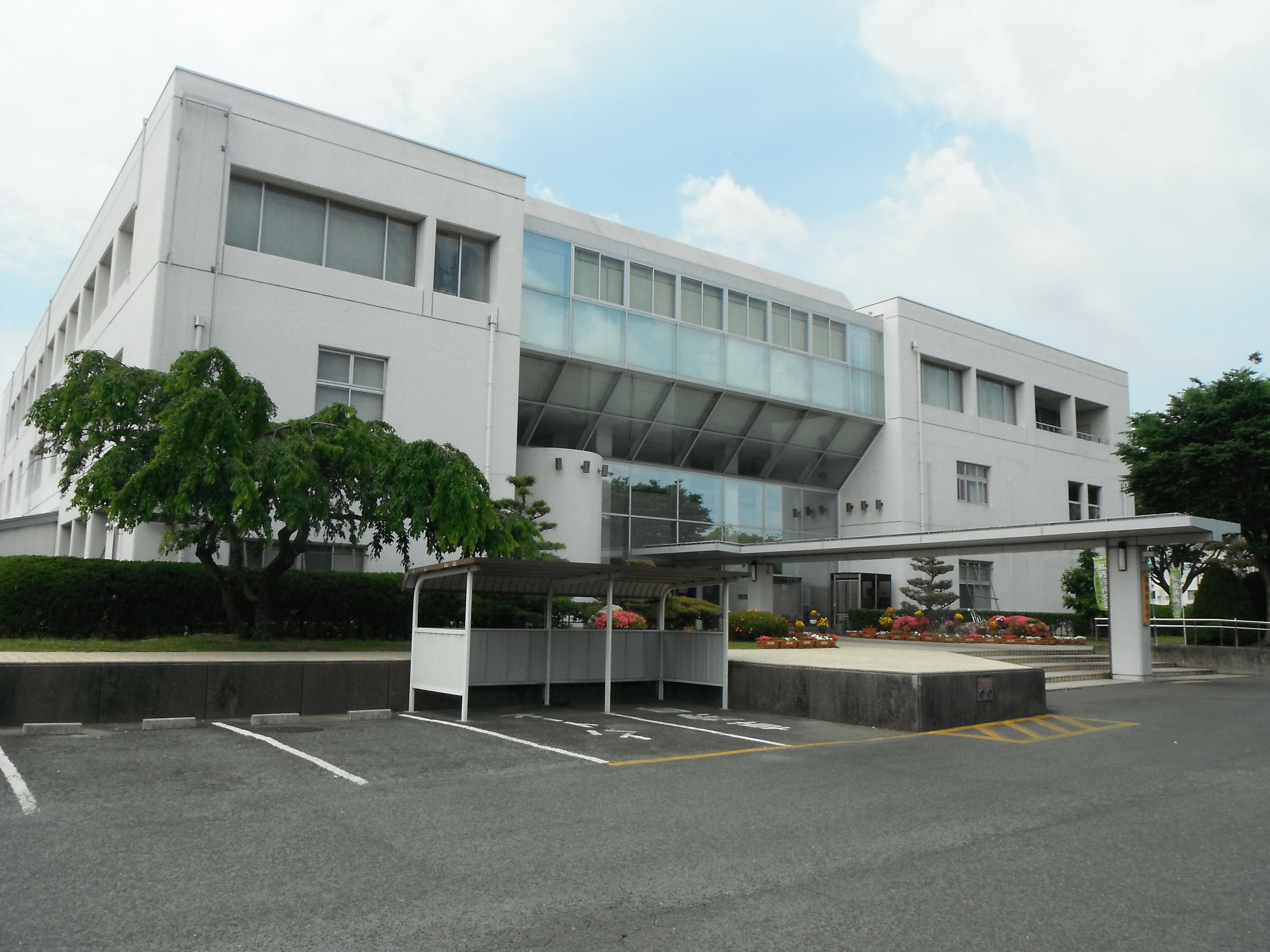
- Kosai City Hall

- Flag Seal

- Location of Kosai in Shizuoka Prefecture

- Coordinates: 34°43′6.4″N 137°31′53.8″E
- Country: Japan
- Region: Chūbu (Tōkai)
- Prefecture: Shizuoka

Government
  - - Mayor: Hiroyuki Tanai

Area
  - Total: 86.56 km^{2} (33.42 sq mi)

Population (October 2020)
  - Total: 57,885
  - Density: 668.7/km^{2} (1,732/sq mi)
- Time zone: UTC+9 (Japan Standard Time)
- Tree: Japanese black pine
- Flower: Common Gardenia
- Phone number: 053-576-1111
- Address: 3268 Kibi, Kosai-shi, Shizuoka-ken 431-0492
- Website: Official website

Kosai (湖西市, Kosai-shi) is a city located in far western Shizuoka Prefecture, Japan. As of 30 June 2019, the city had an estimated population of 57,885 in 24,232 households, and a population density of 668.7 persons per km^{2}. The total area of the city is 85.65 square kilometres (33.07 sq mi).

== Geography ==
Kosai is located in the far southwest corner of Shizuoka Prefecture, bordered by Aichi Prefecture to the west, Lake Hamana to the east. The name of the city means "west of the lake", in reference to its location near Lake Hamana. The city is bordered to the south by the Enshū Gulf of Pacific Ocean. Due to its location, the warm Kuroshio Current offshore provides for a temperate maritime climate with hot, humid summers and mild, cool winters.

=== Neighboring municipalities ===
Aichi Prefecture

- Toyohashi

Shizuoka Prefecture

- Hamamatsu

== Demographics ==
Per Japanese census data, the population of Kosau has been relatively steady over the past 30 years.

Historical population
Year	Pop.	±%
1940	30,843	—
1950	38,884	+26.1%
1960	41,449	+6.6%
1970	46,126	+11.3%
1980	54,252	+17.6%
1990	59,926	+10.5%
2000	60,827	+1.5%
2010	60,043	−1.3%
2020	57,885	−3.6%

=== Climate ===
The city has a climate characterized by characterized by hot and humid summers, and relatively mild winters (Köppen climate classification Cfa). The average annual temperature in Kosai is 16.0 °C. The average annual rainfall is 1942 mm with September as the wettest month. The temperatures are highest on average in August, at around 27.3 °C, and lowest in January, at around 5.5 °C.

== History ==
The area around Kosai has been noted for the production of Japanese pottery and porcelain since the Kofun period. During the Edo period, Kosai was tenryō territory administered directly by the Tokugawa shogunate, and the location of a barrier gate regulating traffic on the old Tōkaidō highway connecting Edo with Kyoto. A post station named Shirasuka-juku developed near the barrier, and this was the forerunner of modern Kosai. During the establishment of the modern municipalities system of the early Meiji period in 1889, the area was reorganized into five villages within Hamana District, Shizuoka. Four of these villages (Washizu, Iride, Shirasuka, Chibata) merged to form the city of Kosai on January 1, 1972.

On March 23, 2010, the town of Arai (from Hamana District) was merged into Kosai. Hamana District was dissolved as a result of this merger.

== Government ==
Kosai has a mayor-council form of government with a directly elected mayor and a unicameral city legislature of 18 members. The city contributes one member to the Shizuoka Prefectural Assembly.

== Economy ==
The economy of Kosai is dominated by light manufacturing of automobile components and electronics, as well as commercial fishing. Kosai is home to Suzuki Motor Corporation's Kosai Assembly Plant, Suzuki's main domestic production plant as well as to plants owned by Panasonic and Sony. Commercial fishing and aquaculture on Lake Hamana is also a component of the city's economy.

== Education ==
Kosai has six public elementary schools and five public middle schools operated by the city government. The city has two public high schools operated by the Shizuoka Prefectural Board of Education. The prefecture also operates a special education school for the handicapped.

The ENE - Escola Nova Era, a Brazilian international school is also located in Kosai. During 1971-1992 a Swedish school was located in Chibata.

== Transportation ==
=== Railway ===
- Central Japan Railway Company - Tōkaidō Main Line
  - Araimachi - Washizu - Shinjohara
- Tenryū Hamanako Railroad Tenryū Hamanako Line
  - Chibata - Ōmori - Asumomae - Shinjohara

=== Highway ===
- National Route 1
- National Route 42
- National Route 301

== Sister cities ==
- Geraldton, Western Australia, Australia, since September 1998 with former Arai town

== Local attractions ==
- Arai Barrier Museum
- Honko-ji temple
- Ōchiwatoge temple ruins, a National Historic Site
- Toyoda Sakichi Memorial Museum

== Notable people from Kosai ==
- Shozo Makino, Olympic silver-medalist swimmer
- Yasuji Miyazaki, Olympic gold-medalist swimmer
- Sakichi Toyoda, founder of Toyota
