= Futagawa Station =

Railway station in Toyohashi, Aichi Prefecture, Japan

CA41 Futagawa Station 二川駅
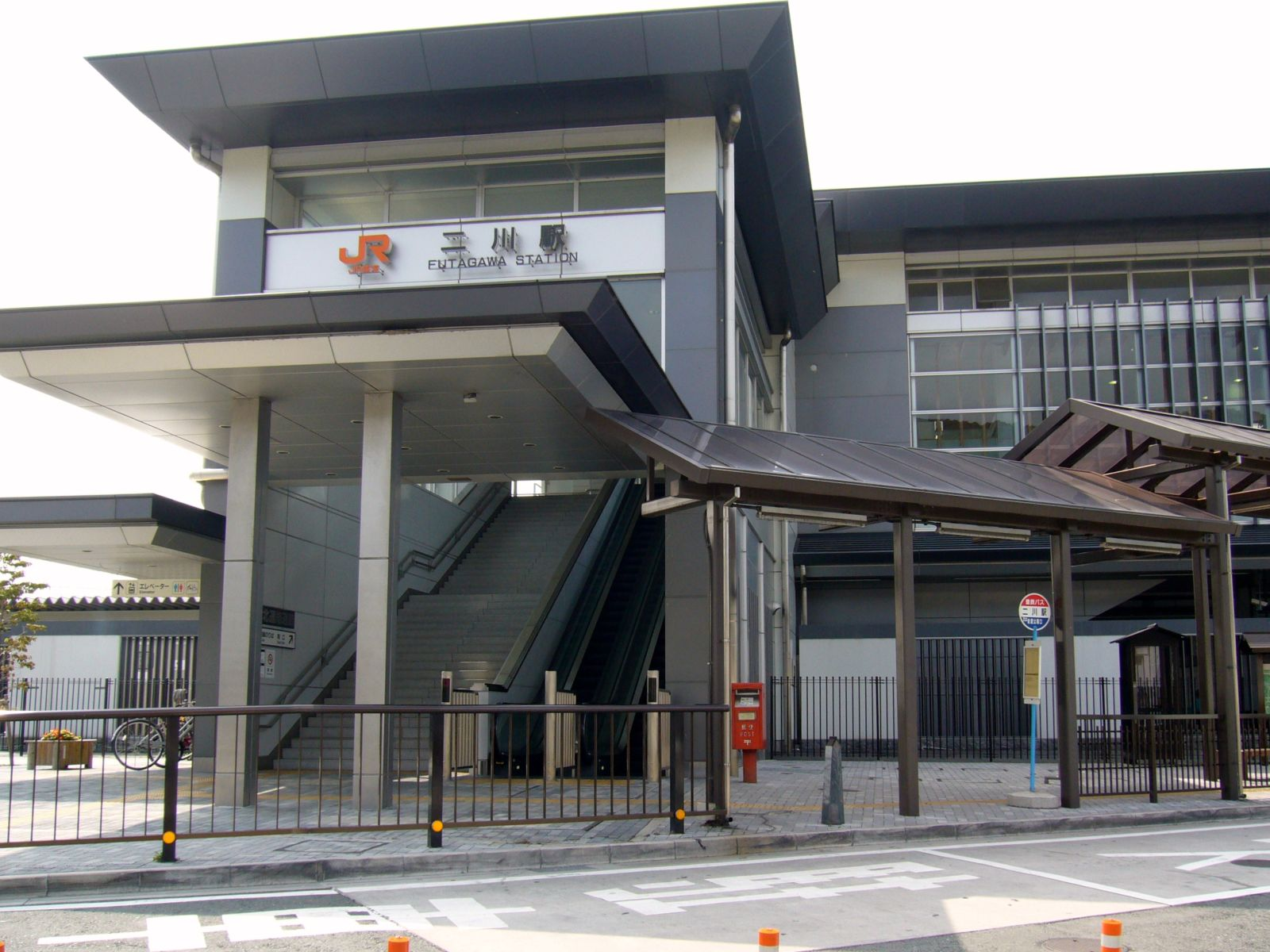
- Futagawa Station in October 2005

General information
- Location: Minamimotoyashiki Oiwacho, Toyohashi-shi, Aichi-ken 441-3144; Japan
- Coordinates: 34.7259°N 137.4388°E
- Operator: JR Central
- Line: Tōkaidō Main Line
- Distance: 286.7 kilometers from Tokyo
- Platforms: 2 island platforms

Other information
- Status: Staffed
- Station code: CA41
- Website: Official website

History
- Opened: April 7, 1896

Passengers
- 2023–2024: 5,486 daily
Location
- Location within Aichi Prefecture Location within Japan

Futagawa Station (二川駅, Futagawa-eki) is a railway station in the city of Toyohashi, Aichi Prefecture, Japan, operated by Central Japan Railway Company (JR Tōkai).

== Lines ==
Futagawa Station is served by the Tōkaidō Main Line, and is located 286.7 kilometers from the southern terminus of the line at Tokyo Station.

== Station layout ==
The station has a two island platforms connected to the station building by a footbridge; however, track 1 is not in use. The station building has automated ticket machines, TOICA automated turnstiles and is staffed.

=== Platforms ===
1	■ Tōkaidō Main Line	For Hamamatsu, Shizuoka
2・3	■ Tōkaidō Main Line	For Toyohashi, Nagoya

== Adjacent stations ==
«	Service	»
Central Japan Railway Company
Tōkaidō Main Line
Shinjohara	Special Rapid	Toyohashi
Shinjohara	New Rapid	Toyohashi
Shinjohara	Local	Toyohashi

== Station history ==
Futagawa Station was opened on April 7, 1896 on the Japanese Government Railway (JGR) Tōkaidō Line. The JGR became the JNR after World War II. Freight service was discontinued in 1971 and small parcel service from 1979. Along with the division and privatization of JNR on April 1, 1987, the station came under the control and operation of the Central Japan Railway Company. A new station building was completed from 2000-2002 (JR Tōkai). Automated turnstiles using the TOICA IC Card system came into operation from November 25, 2006.

Station numbering was introduced to the section of the Tōkaidō Line operated JR Central in March 2018; Futagawa Station was assigned station number CA41.

== Passenger statistics ==
In fiscal 2017, the station was used by an average of 3110 passengers daily.

== Surrounding area ==
- Futagawa-juku

== See also ==
- List of railway stations in Japan
