= Futagawa-juku =

Thirty-third of the 53 stations of the Tōkaidō

Coordinates: 34°43′24″N 137°26′59″E

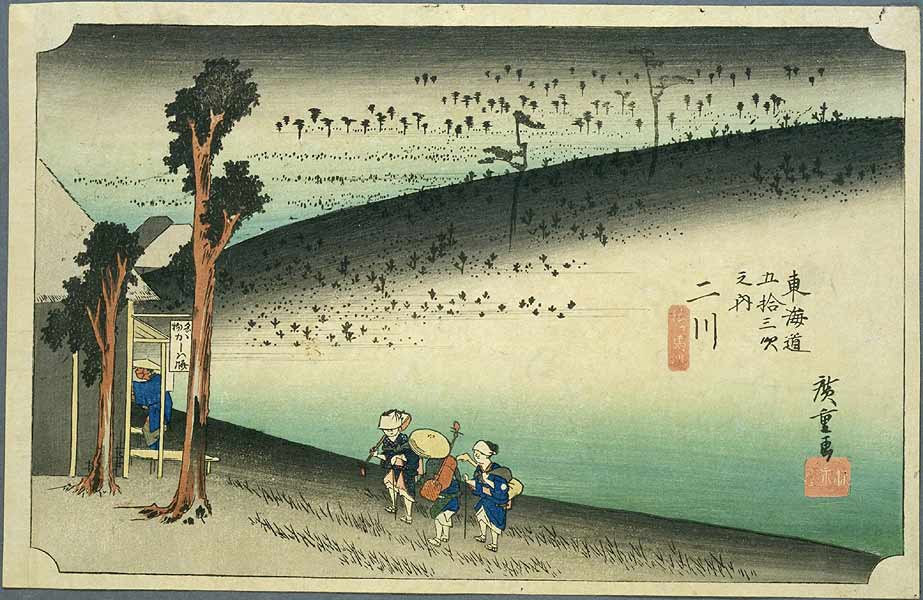
Futagawa-juku in the 1830s, as depicted by Hiroshige in the Hōeidō edition of The Fifty-three Stations of the Tōkaidō 1831–1834)

Futagawa-juku (二川宿, Futagawa-juku) was the thirty-third of the fifty-three stations of the Tōkaidō. It is located in what is now the city of Toyohashi, Aichi Prefecture, Japan. It was the easternmost post station in Mikawa Province.

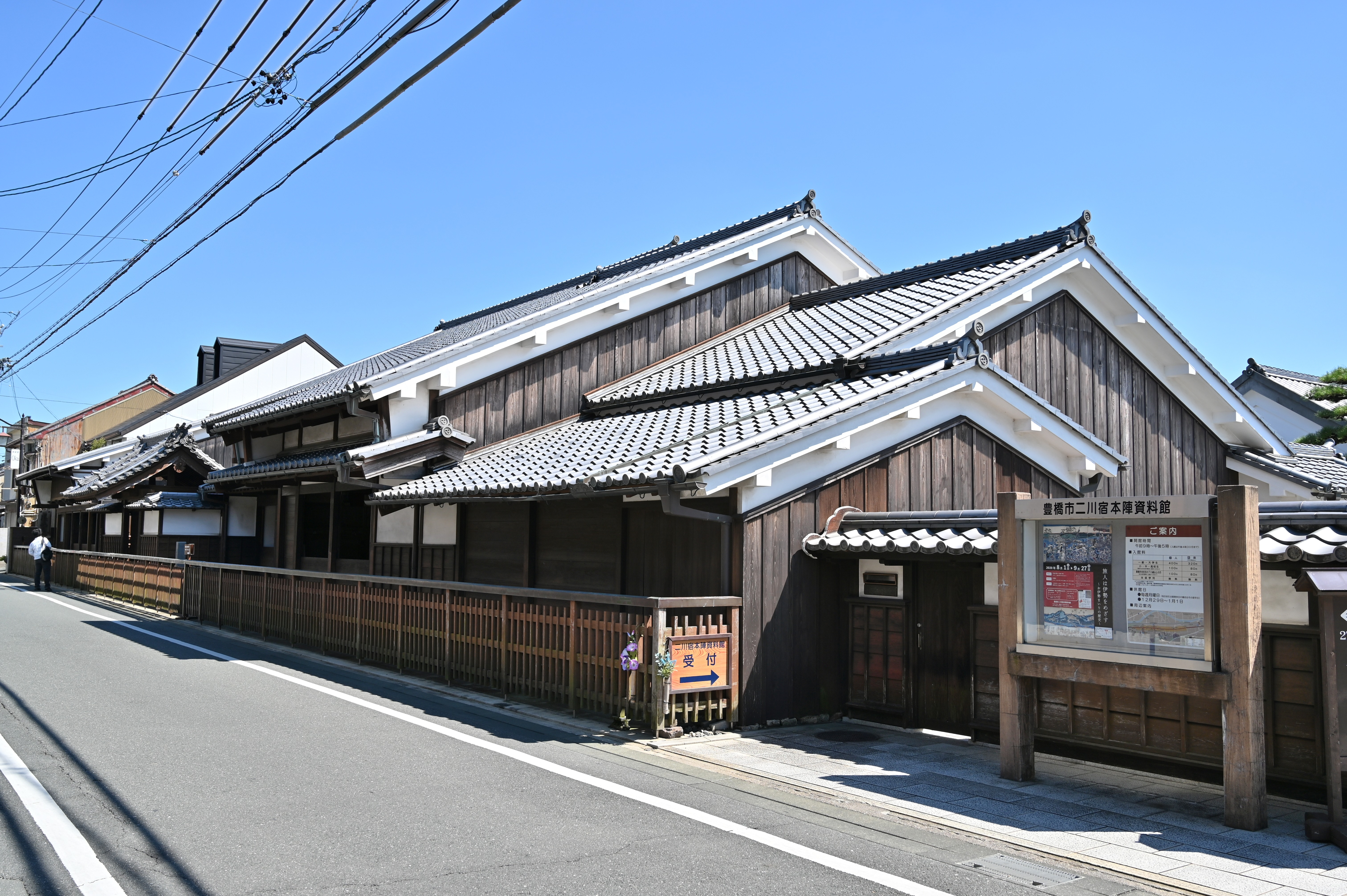
Futagawa Syuku Honjin Museum

== History ==
Futagawa-juku was established in 1601 when two villages, Futagawa (二川村 Futagawa-mura) and Ōiwa (大岩村 Ōiwa-mura), in Mikawa Province's Atsumi District were directed with caring for travelers. However, as the towns were rather small and were separated by 1.3 km, the original setup did not last long. In 1644, the Tokugawa shogunate moved the village of Futagawa further to the west and the village of Ōiwa further to the east, before reestablishing the post station in the Futagawa's new location. An ai no shuku was built in Ōiwa.

Futagawa-juku was located approximately 283 kilometres (176 mi) from Edo's Nihonbashi, the start of the Tōkaidō. Furthermore, it was 5.8 kilometres (3.6 mi) from Shirasuka-juku to the east and 6.1 kilometres (3.8 mi) from Yoshida-juku to the west. Futagawa-juku itself stretched for about 1.3 kilometres (0.81 mi) along the road and held one honjin, one waki-honjin, and about 30 hatago. The honjin was destroyed many times by fire, but was always rebuilt. The honjin that existed after the Meiji period was rebuilt in 1988 and became an archives museum.

The classic ukiyo-e print by Andō Hiroshige (Hōeidō edition) from 1831–1834 depicts a rather bleak landscape, with weary travellers approaching an isolated teahouse.

During the Meiji Restoration when rail lines were being laid, the tracks ran through the town, but there was no station. After realizing the value of railroad, the town petitioned for a station and Futagawa Station was eventually built between Futagawa and Ōiwa. As the station was built slightly apart from Futagawa, remnants from the Edo period post station can be found approximately two kilometers from the station.

== Neighboring Post Towns ==
Tōkaidō
Shirasuka-juku - Futagawa-juku - Yoshida-juku
