= Chibata Station =

Railway station in Kosai, Shizuoka Prefecture, Japan

Chibata Station 知波田駅
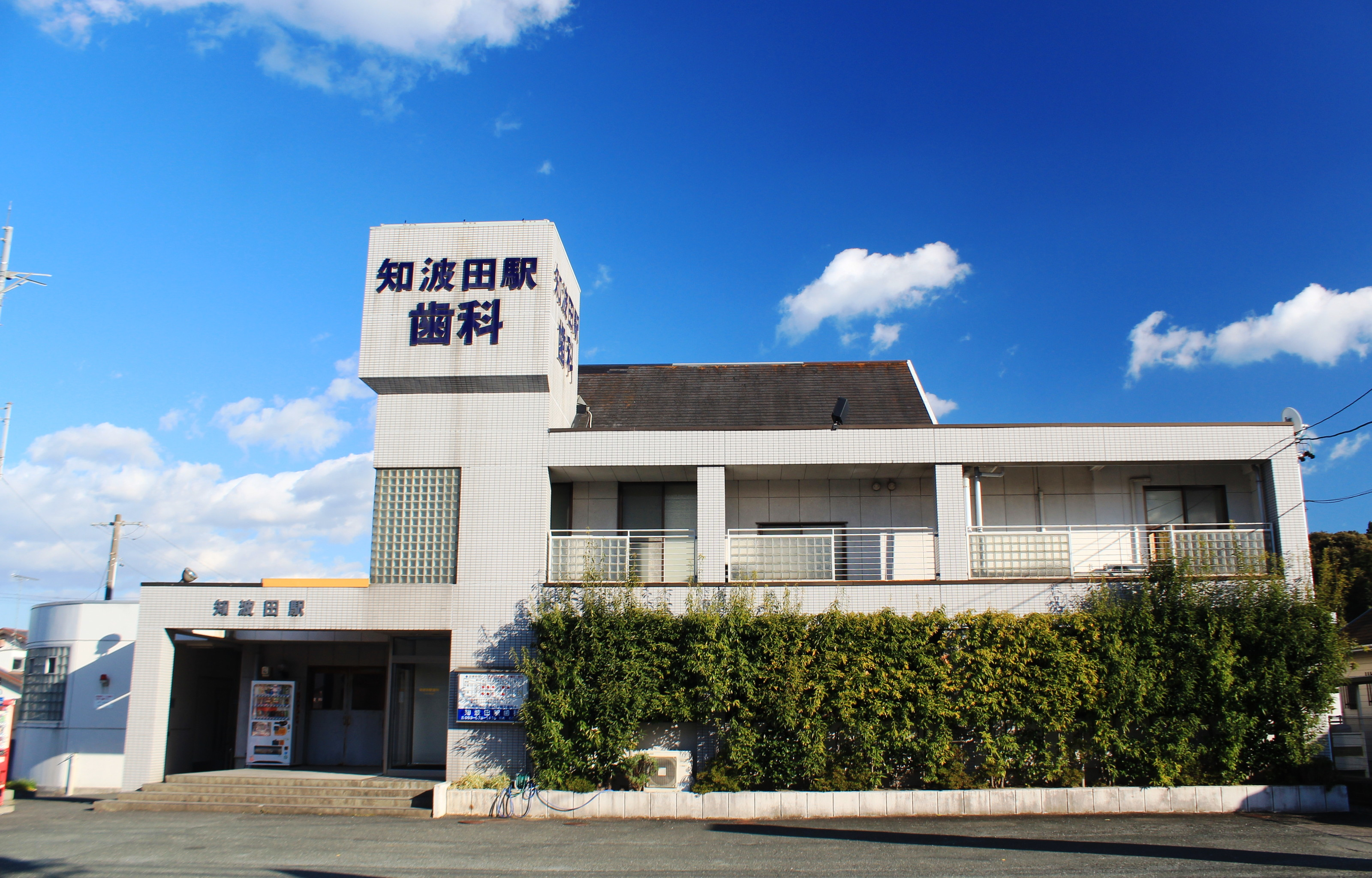
- Chibata Stationing December 2013

General information
- Location: 469-20 Ota, Kosai-shi, Shizuoka-ken; Japan
- Coordinates: 34°45′12″N 137°30′43″E
- Operator: Tenryū Hamanako Railroad
- Line: ■ Tenryū Hamanako Line
- Distance: 62.9 kilometers from Kakegawa
- Platforms: 2 side platforms

Other information
- Status: Unstaffed
- Website: Official website

History
- Opened: December 1, 1936

Passengers
- FY2016: 50 daily
Location
- Location within Shizuoka Prefecture Location within Japan

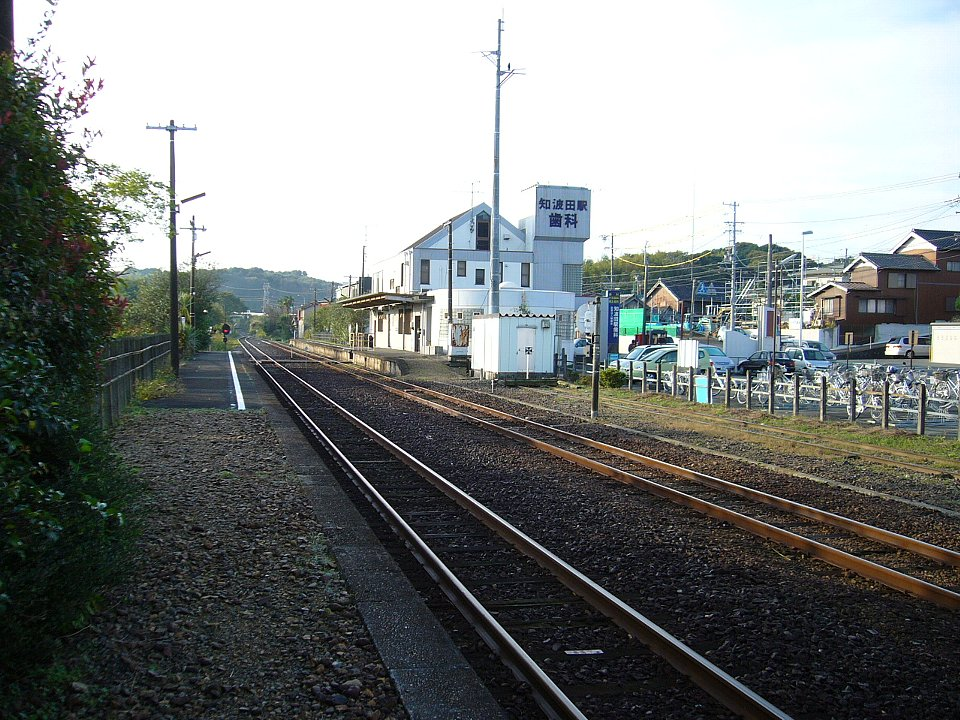
Platforms

Chibata Station (知波田駅, Chibata-eki) is a railway station in the city of Kosai, Shizuoka Prefecture, Japan, operated by the third sector Tenryū Hamanako Railroad.

== Lines ==
Chibata Station is served by the Tenryū Hamanako Line, and is located 62.9 kilometers from the starting point of the line at Kakegawa Station.

== Station layout ==
The station has two opposing side platforms serving two tracks, connected by a level crossing. The two-story station building also serves as the local dental clinic. The station is unattended.

== Adjacent stations ==
«	Service	»
Tenryū Hamanako Railroad
Tenryū Hamanako Line
Ona	-	Ōmori

== Station History ==
Chibata Station was established on December 1, 1936, as a station of the Japan National Railway's Futamata-nishi Line. Freight services were discontinued from 1962, and small parcel services from 1970, after which time the station was no longer staffed. On March 15, 1987, the station came under the control of the Tenryū Hamanako Line.

== Passenger statistics ==
In fiscal 2016, the station was used by an average of 50 passengers daily (boarding passengers only).

== Surrounding area ==
- Japan National Route 301

== See also ==
- List of railway stations in Japan
