= Hamakita-ku =

Hamakita 浜北区
- Ward
- Hamakita Ward
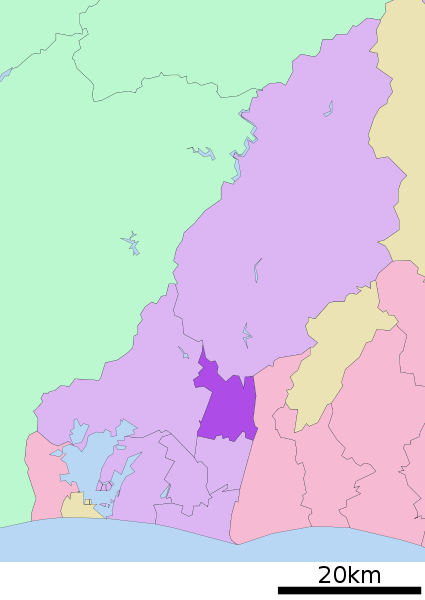
- Location of Hamakita-ku in Shizuoka

- Coordinates: 34°46′30″N 137°48′56″E
- Country: Japan
- Region: Chūbu
- Prefecture: Shizuoka
- City: Hamamatsu

Area
  - Total: 66.50 km^{2} (25.68 sq mi)

Population (December 1, 2019)
  - Total: 98,442
  - Density: 1,480/km^{2} (3,834/sq mi)
- Time zone: UTC+9 (Japan Standard Time)
- Phone number: 053-926-1111
- Address: Nishimisono 6-banchi, Hamakita-ku, Hamamatsu, Shizuoka 434-8550
- Website: Hamakita-ku home page

Hamakita-ku (浜北区) was a ward in Hamamatsu, Shizuoka Prefecture, Japan. It is bordered by Tenryū-ku, Higashi-ku, Naka-ku and the city of Iwata. The Tenryū River and the Akaishi Mountains form natural boundaries for the ward.

Hamakita Ward was established on April 1, 2007. As of 2009, it had a population of 90,817 persons in an area of 66.51 km^{2}, with a population density of 1370 persons per km^{2}.

== Transportation ==
=== Railroads ===
Central Station: Hamakita Station

- Enshū Railway
  - Enshū-Komatsu - Hamakita - Misono-Chūō-kōen - Enshū-Kobayashi- Enshū-Shibamoto - Enshū-Gansuiji
- Tenryū Hamanako Railroad
  - Gansuiji - Miyaguchi

=== Bus ===
- Enshū Railway Bus
- Hamakita Community Bus
- Iwata City Bus - Toyooka Line
- Hamamatsu Bus

=== National Route ===
- Route 152(Hiryū Kaidō-飛龍街道)
- Route 362

=== Prefectural Route ===
- Main Regional Routes
  - Shizuoka Prefectural Route 45(Kasai Kaidō)
  - Shizuoka Prefectural Route 61
  - Shizuoka Prefectural Route 65
  - Shizuoka Prefectural Route 68
- Ordinary Prefectural Roads
  - Shizuoka Prefectural Route 296
  - Shizuoka Prefectural Route 299
  - Shizuoka Prefectural Route 304
  - Shizuoka Prefectural Route 311
  - Shizuoka Prefectural Route 344
  - Shizuoka Prefectural Route 363
  - Shizuoka Prefectural Route 391

== Government ==
=== Hamakita Ward Office ===
The ward office is located at 6 Nishimisono. The hall is split into north and south halls and the south hall was previously used as Kitahama Village Hall. The north hall was built as a result of five municipalities merged to form the town of Hamakita and later become the city of Hamakita.

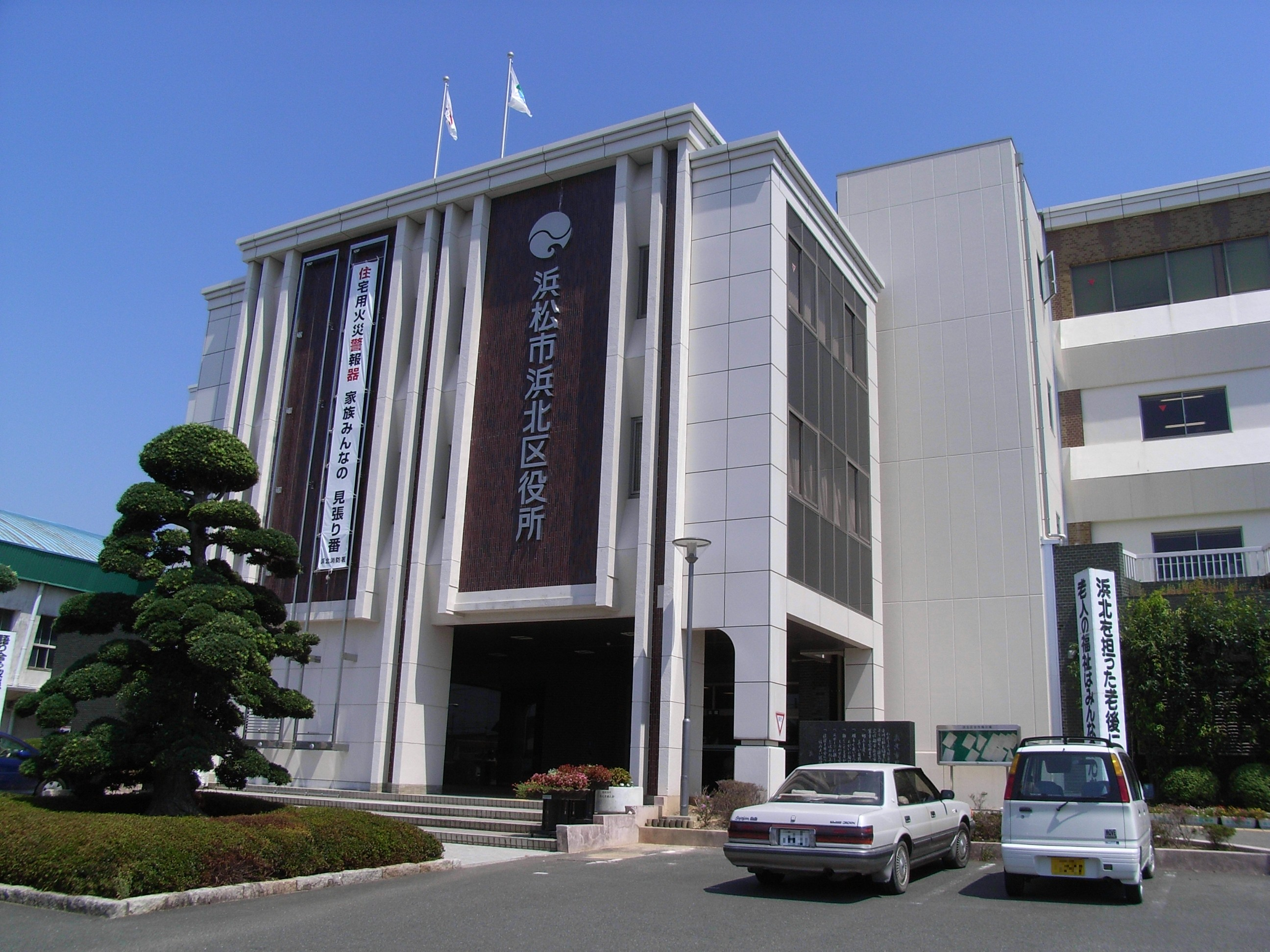
Hamakita Ward Office, Hamamatsu

== Districts within Hamakita Ward ==
=== Hamana District (浜名地区) ===
- Uchino(内野)
- Uchinodai(内野台)
- Komatsu(小松)
- Somejidai(染地台)
- Hirakuchi(平口)

=== Hamakita District (北浜地区) ===
- Aburaisshiki(油一色)
- Kamizenji(上善地)
- Kibune(貴布祢)
- Kobayashi(小林)
- Zenji(善地)
- Takasono(高薗)
- Takabatake(高畑)
- Terajima(寺島)
- Dōhon(道本)
- Nakajō(中条)
- Nagashima(永島)
- Niino(新野)
- Niibori(新堀)
- Nishimisono(西美薗)
- Numa(沼)
- Higashimisono(東美薗)
- Honzawai(本沢合)
- Yawata(八幡)
- Yokosuka(横須賀)
- Ryūnan(竜南)

=== Nakase District (中瀬地区) ===
- Kamijima(上島)
- Toyoyasu(豊保)
- Nakase(中瀬)

=== Akasa District (赤佐地区) ===
- Ono(尾野)
- Oro(於呂)
- Negata(根堅)

=== Aratama District (麁玉地区) ===
- Oidaira(大平)
- Sandaichi(三大地)
- Shinpara(新原)
- Hainoki(灰木)
- Horiya(堀谷)
- Miyaguchi(宮口)
- Yondaichi(四大地)
