= Hamanako-Sakume Station =

Railway station in Hamamatsu, Japan

Hamanako-Sakume Station 浜名湖佐久米駅
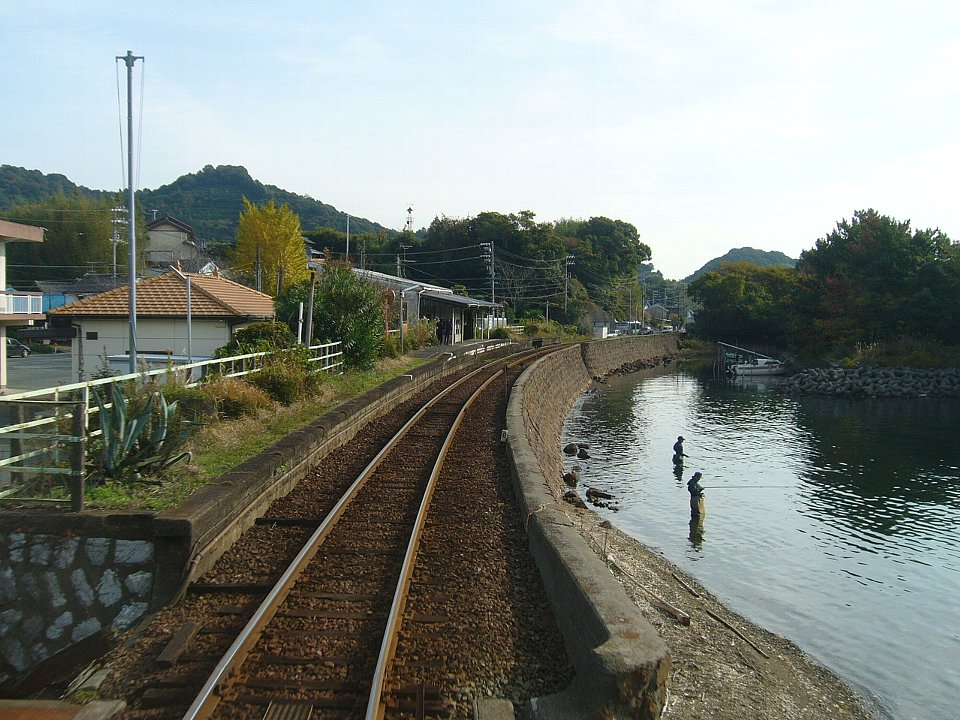
- Hamanako-Sakume Station in November 2006

General information
- Location: Mikkabi-cho Sakume, Hamana-ku, Hamamatsu-shi, Shizuoka-ken 431-1401; Japan
- Coordinates: 34°47′21″N 137°35′58″E
- Operator: Tenryū Hamanako Railroad
- Line: ■ Tenryū Hamanako Line
- Distance: 50.7 kilometers from Kakegawa
- Platforms: 1 side platform

Other information
- Website: Official website

History
- Opened: April 1, 1938

Passengers
- FY2016: 25 daily
Location
- Location within Shizuoka Prefecture Location within Japan

Hamanako-Sakume Station (浜名湖佐久米駅, Hamanako-Sakume-eki) is a railway station in Hamana-ku, Hamamatsu, Shizuoka Prefecture, Japan, operated by the third sector Tenryū Hamanako Railroad.

== Lines ==
Hamanako-Sakume Station is served by the Tenryū Hamanako Line, and is located 50.7 kilometers from the starting point of the line at Kakegawa Station.

== Station layout ==
The station has a single side platform. The station building, located directly on the shores of Lake Hamana, doubles as a local cafe. The station is unattended.

== Adjacent stations ==
«	Service	»
Tenryū Hamanako Railroad
Tenryū Hamanako Line
Sunza	-	Higashi-Tsuzuki

== Station history ==
Hamanako-Sakume Station was established on April 1, 1938 as a station of the Japan National Railways Futamata Line with the completion of the Kanasashi-Mikkabi extension. Freight services were discontinued from 1962, and small parcel services from 1970, after which time the station was no longer staffed. On March 15, 1987, the station came under the control of the Tenryū Hamanako Line.

== Passenger statistics ==
In fiscal 2016, the station was used by an average of 25 passengers daily (boarding passengers only).

== Surrounding area ==
- Lake Hamana
- Japan National Route 362

== See also ==
- List of railway stations in Japan
