= Sunza Station =

Railway station in Hamamatsu, Japan

Sunza Station 寸座駅
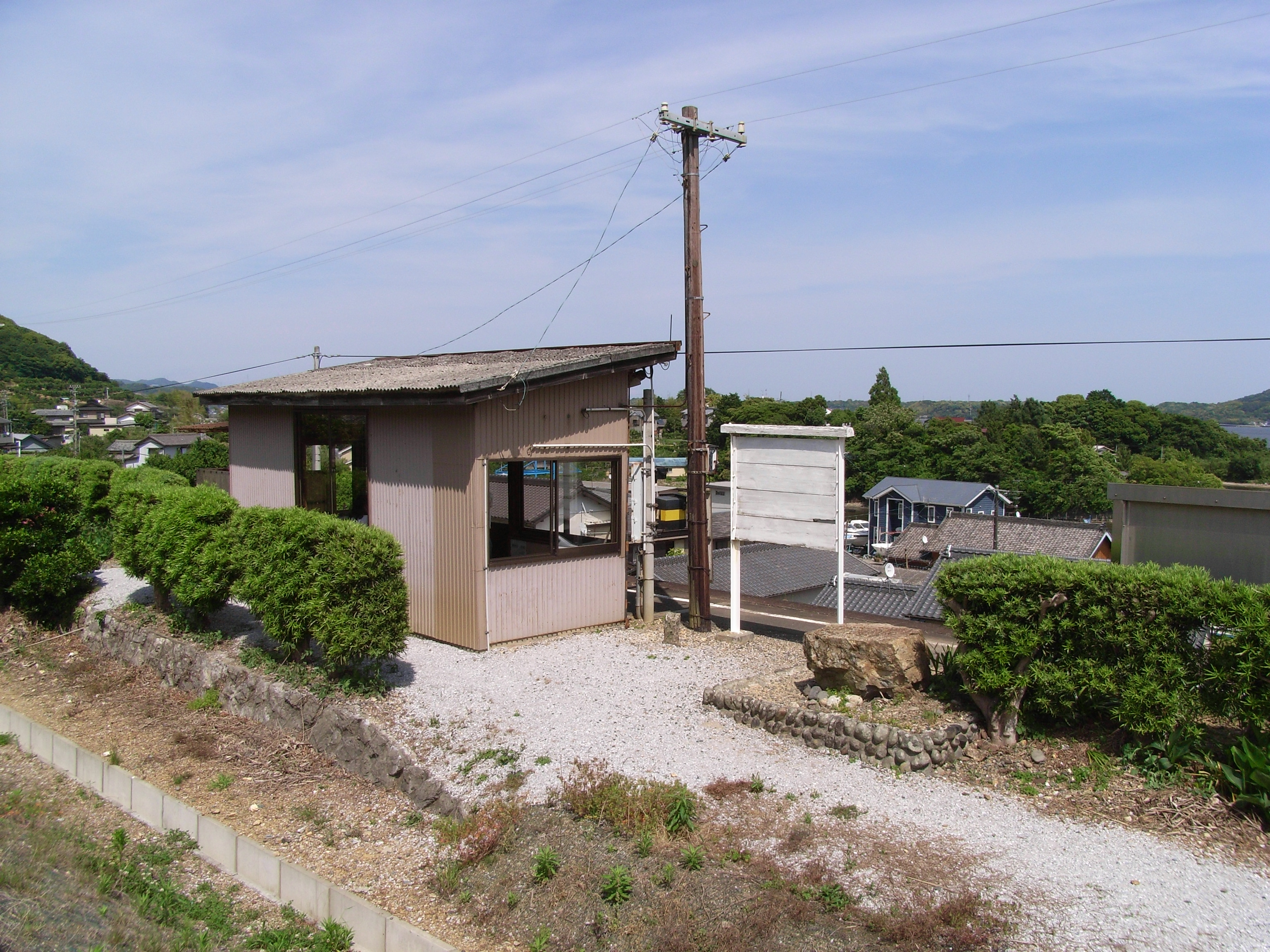
- Sunza Station in May 2009

General information
- Location: Horie-cho, Kiga, Hamana-ku, Hamamatsu-shi, Shizuoka-ken; Japan
- Coordinates: 34°47′24″N 137°36′45″E
- Operator: Tenryū Hamanako Railroad
- Line: ■ Tenryū Hamanako Line
- Distance: 49.4 kilometers from Kakegawa
- Platforms: 1 side platform

Other information
- Website: Official website

History
- Opened: May 6, 1955

Passengers
- FY2016: 18 daily
Location
- Location within Shizuoka Prefecture Location within Japan

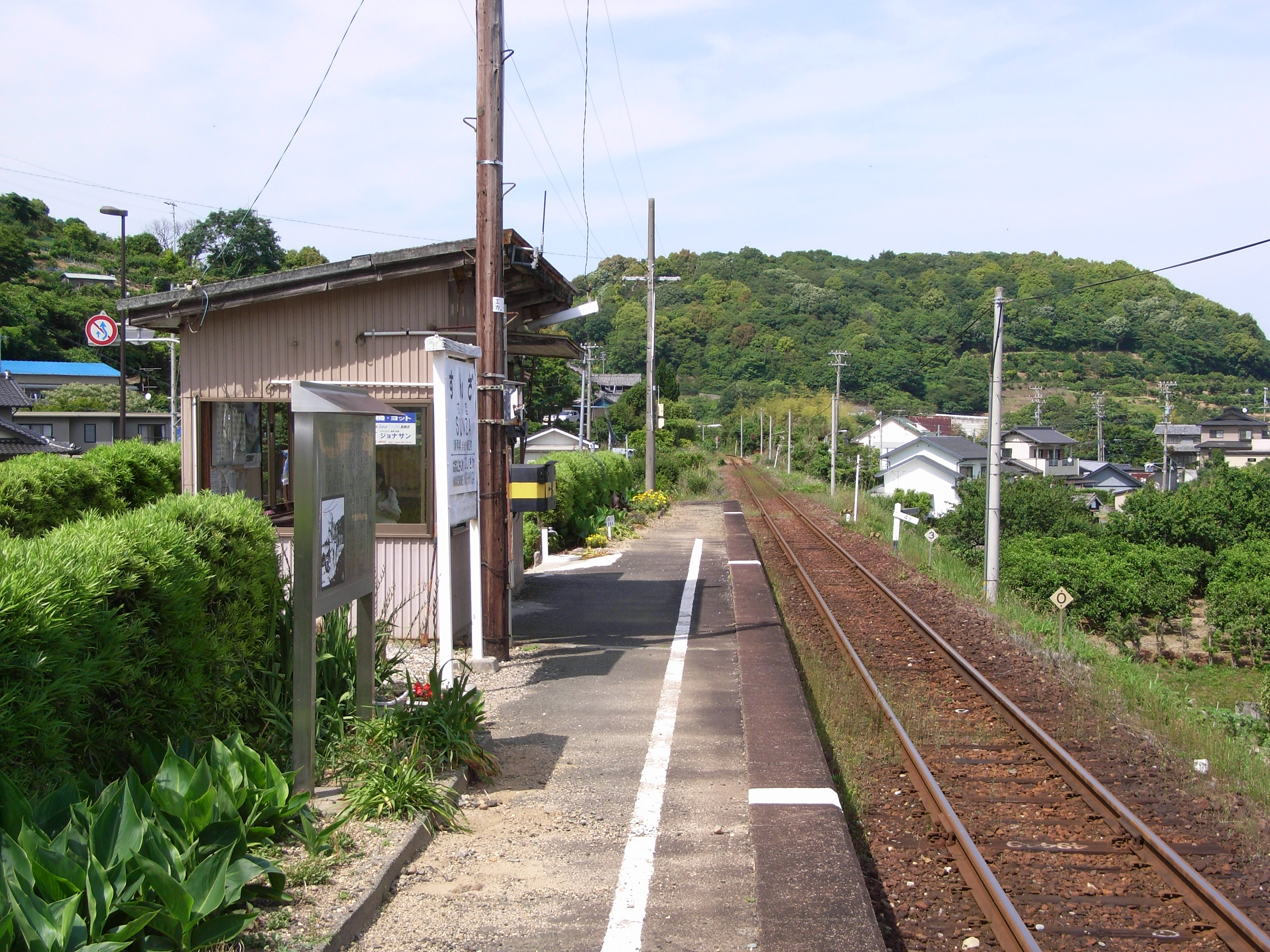
Platform

Sunza Station (寸座駅, Sunza-eki) is a railway station in Hamana-ku, Hamamatsu, Shizuoka Prefecture, Japan, operated by the third sector Tenryū Hamanako Railroad.

== Lines ==
Nishi-Kiga Station is served by the Tenryū Hamanako Line, and is located 49.4 kilometers from the starting point of the line at Kakegawa Station.

== Station layout ==
The station has a single side platform and no station building. A small rain shelter for passengers is located directly on the platform, and faces towards nearby Lake Hamana. The station is unattended.

== Adjacent stations ==
«	Service	»
Tenryū Hamanako Railroad
Tenryū Hamanako Line
Nishi-Kiga	-	Hamanako-Sakume

== Station history ==
Sunza Station was established on May 6, 1955 as a station of the Japan National Railways Futamata Line. On March 15, 1987, the station came under the control of the Tenryū Hamanako Line.

== Passenger statistics ==
In fiscal 2016, the station was used by an average of 18 passengers daily (boarding passengers only).

== Surrounding area ==
- Lake Hamana
- Japan National Route 362

== See also ==
- List of railway stations in Japan
