= Hamakita (disambiguation) =

Hamakita may refer to:

- Hamakita, Shizuoka, a former municipality in Japan
- Hamakita Station, a railway station in Hamakita-ku, Hamamatsu, Shizuoka Prefecture, Japan
- Hamakita Ward, the ward of Hamamatsu of which it became a part

== See also ==
- Hamaki
- Hamakita Hiryu Festival, festival in Hamamatsu held in honor of Ryujin, the god believed to be associated with the Tenryū River, and features a wide variety of events such as the Hamakita takoage (kite flying) event and the Hiryu himatsuri (flying dragon fire festival) which celebrates water, sound, and flame.
