= Nishi-Kiga Station =

Railway station in Hamamatsu, Japan

Nishi-Kiga Station 西気賀駅
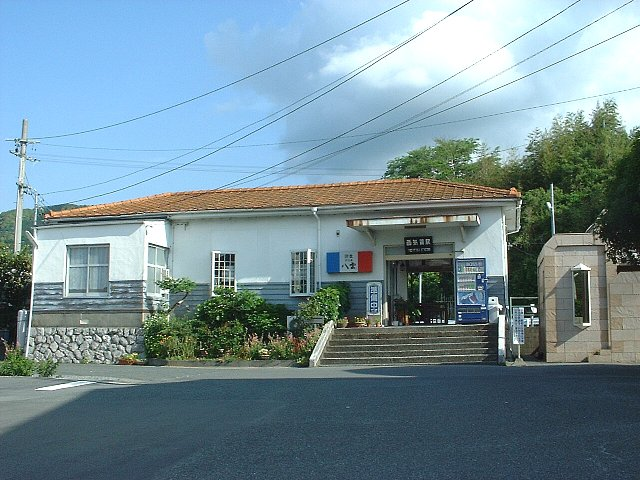
- Nishi-Kiga Station in March 2006

General information
- Location: Horie-cho, Kiga, Hamana-ku, Hamamatsu-shi, Shizuoka-ken 431-1305; Japan
- Coordinates: 34°48′09″N 137°37′19″E
- Operator: Tenryū Hamanako Railroad
- Line: ■ Tenryū Hamanako Line
- Distance: 47.7 kilometers from Kakegawa
- Platforms: 2 side platforms

Other information
- Website: Official website

History
- Opened: April 1, 1938

Passengers
- FY2016: 38 daily
Location
- Location within Shizuoka Prefecture Location within Japan

Nishi-Kiga Station (西気賀駅, Nishi-Kiga-eki) is a railway station in Hamana-ku, Hamamatsu, Shizuoka Prefecture, Japan, operated by the third sector Tenryū Hamanako Railroad.

== Lines ==
Nishi-Kiga Station is served by the Tenryū Hamanako Line, and is located 47.7 kilometers from the starting point of the line at Kakegawa Station.

== Station layout ==
The station has opposing island platforms joined by a level crossing within the station. The adjacent wooden station building is unstaffed, also contains a restaurant. The station building, and waiting room on the platform are protected as Registered Tangible Cultural Properties of Japan since 2011.

== Adjacent stations ==
«	Service	»
Tenryū Hamanako Railroad
Tenryū Hamanako Line
Kiga	-	Sunza

== Station history ==
Nishi-Kiga Station was established on April 1, 1938 as a station of the Japan National Railways Futamata Line. Scheduled freight services were discontinued from June 1970. On March 15, 1987, the station came under the control of the Tenryū Hamanako Line.

== Passenger statistics ==
In fiscal 2016, the station was used by an average of 38 passengers daily (boarding passengers only).

== Surrounding area ==
- Lake Hamana
- Japan National Route 362

== See also ==
- List of railway stations in Japan
