= Kiga Station =

Railway station in Hamamatsu, Japan

Kiga Station 気賀駅
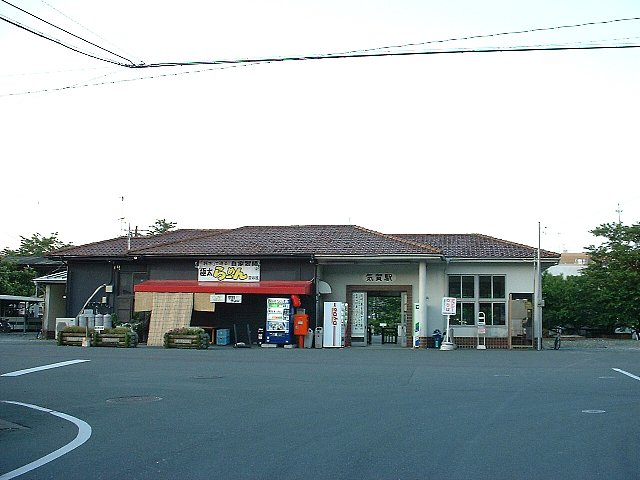
- Kiga Station in March 2006

General information
- Location: Hosoe-cho, Kiga, Hamana-ku, Hamamatsu-shi, Shizuoka-ken 431-1305; Japan
- Coordinates: 34°48′26″N 137°39′7″E
- Operator: Tenryū Hamanako Railroad
- Line: ■ Tenryū Hamanako Line
- Distance: 44.8 kilometers from Kakegawa
- Platforms: 1 island platform

Other information
- Website: Official website

History
- Opened: April 1, 1938

Passengers
- FY2016: 105 daily
Location
- Location within Shizuoka Prefecture Location within Japan

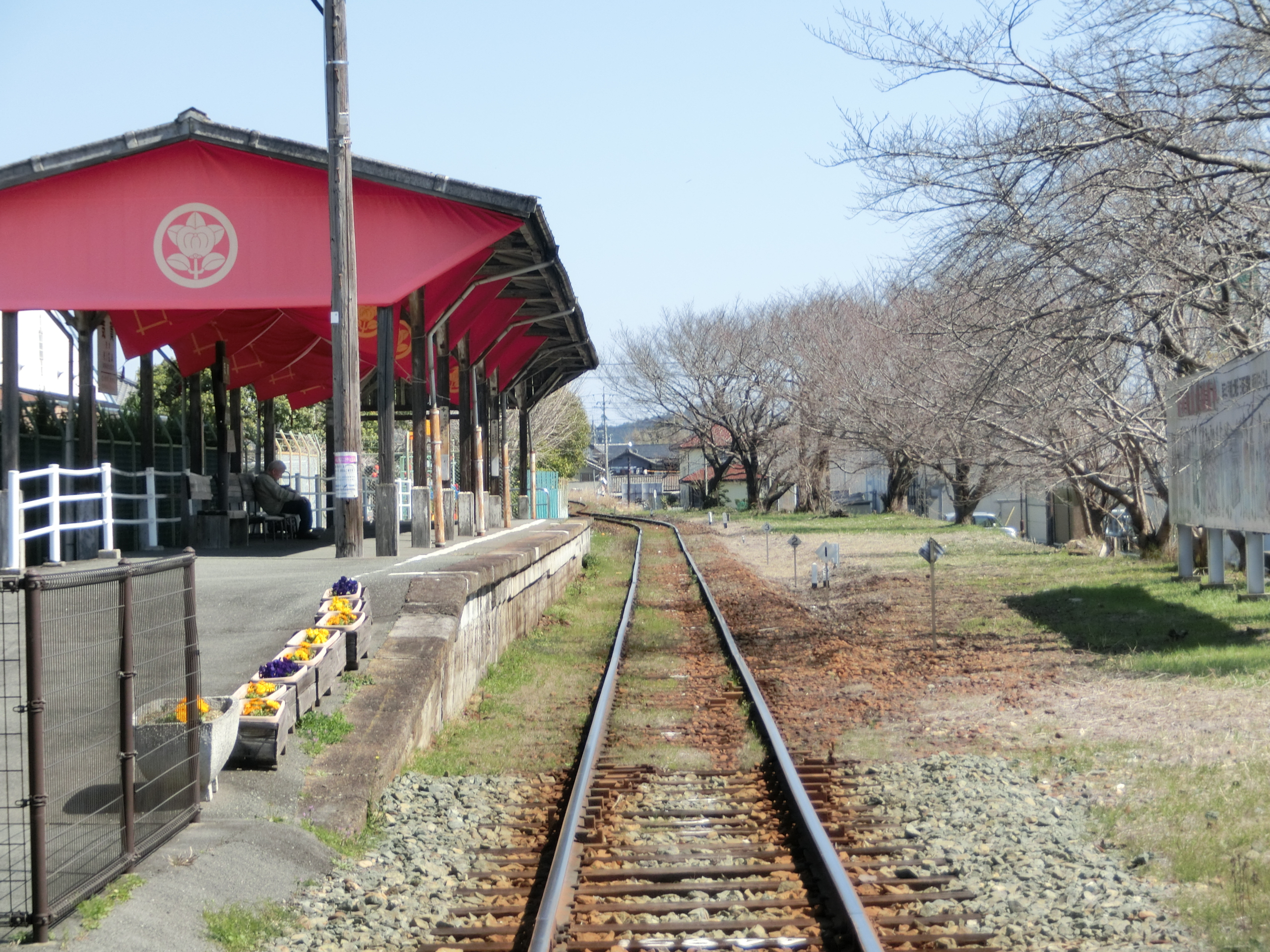
Platform

Kiga Station (気賀駅, Kiga-eki) is a railway station in Hamana-ku, Hamamatsu, Shizuoka Prefecture, Japan, operated by the third sector Tenryū Hamanako Railroad.

== Lines ==
Kiga Station is served by the Tenryū Hamanako Line, and is located 44.8 kilometers from the starting point of the line at Kakegawa Station.

== Station layout ==
The station has a single island platform with only one of its two tracks in operation. The adjacent single-story wooden station building, connected by a level crossing, also contains a ramen noodle restaurant. The station building, goods shed, platform and viaduct are protected as Registered Tangible Cultural Properties of Japan since 2011.

== Adjacent stations ==
«	Service	»
Tenryū Hamanako Railroad
Tenryū Hamanako Line
Okaji	-	Nishi-Kiga

== Station history ==
Kiga Station was established on April 1, 1938, as a station of the Japan National Railways Futamata Line. Scheduled freight services were discontinued in June 1970. On March 15, 1987, the station came under the control of the Tenryū Hamanako Line.

== Passenger statistics ==
In fiscal 2016, the station was used by an average of 105 passengers daily (boarding passengers only).

== Surrounding area ==
- former Hosoe Town Hall
- Japan National Route 362

== See also ==
- List of railway stations in Japan
