= Enshū-Nishigasaki Station =

Railway station in Hamamatsu, Japan

Enshū-Nishigasaki Station 遠州西ヶ崎駅
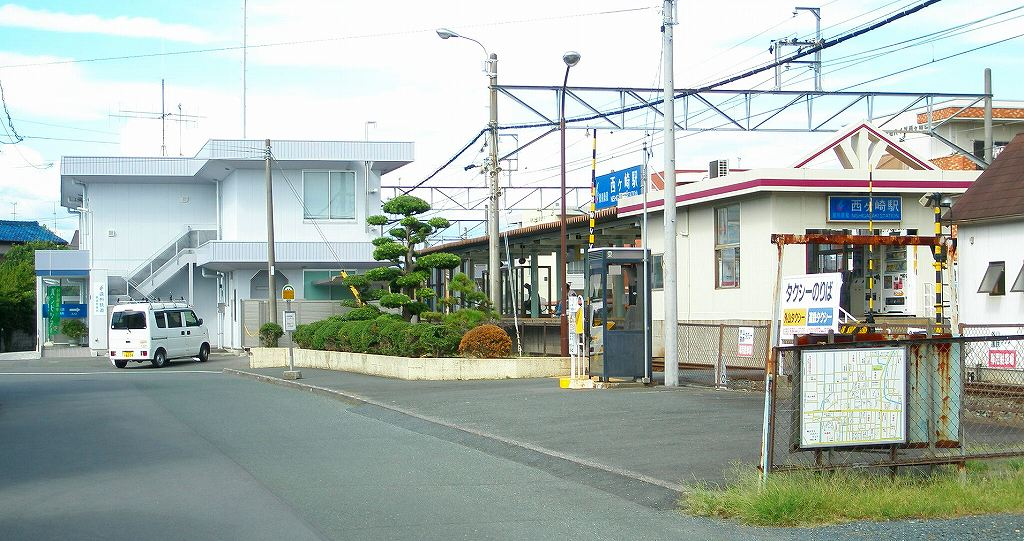
- Enshū-Nishigasaki Station in August 2008

General information
- Location: Nishigasaki-cho 686-1, Chūō-ku, Hamamatsu-shi, Shizuoka-ken 431-3115; Japan
- Coordinates: 34°46′36.22″N 137°46′25.84″E
- Operator: Enshū Railway
- Line: ■ Enshū Railway Line
- Distance: 9.2 km from Shin-Hamamatsu
- Platforms: 1 island platforms

Other information
- Status: Staffed
- Station code: 11

History
- Opened: December 6, 1909
- Former names: Nishigasaki (to 1923)

Passengers
- FY2017: 859 (daily)
Location
- Location within Shizuoka Prefecture Location within Japan

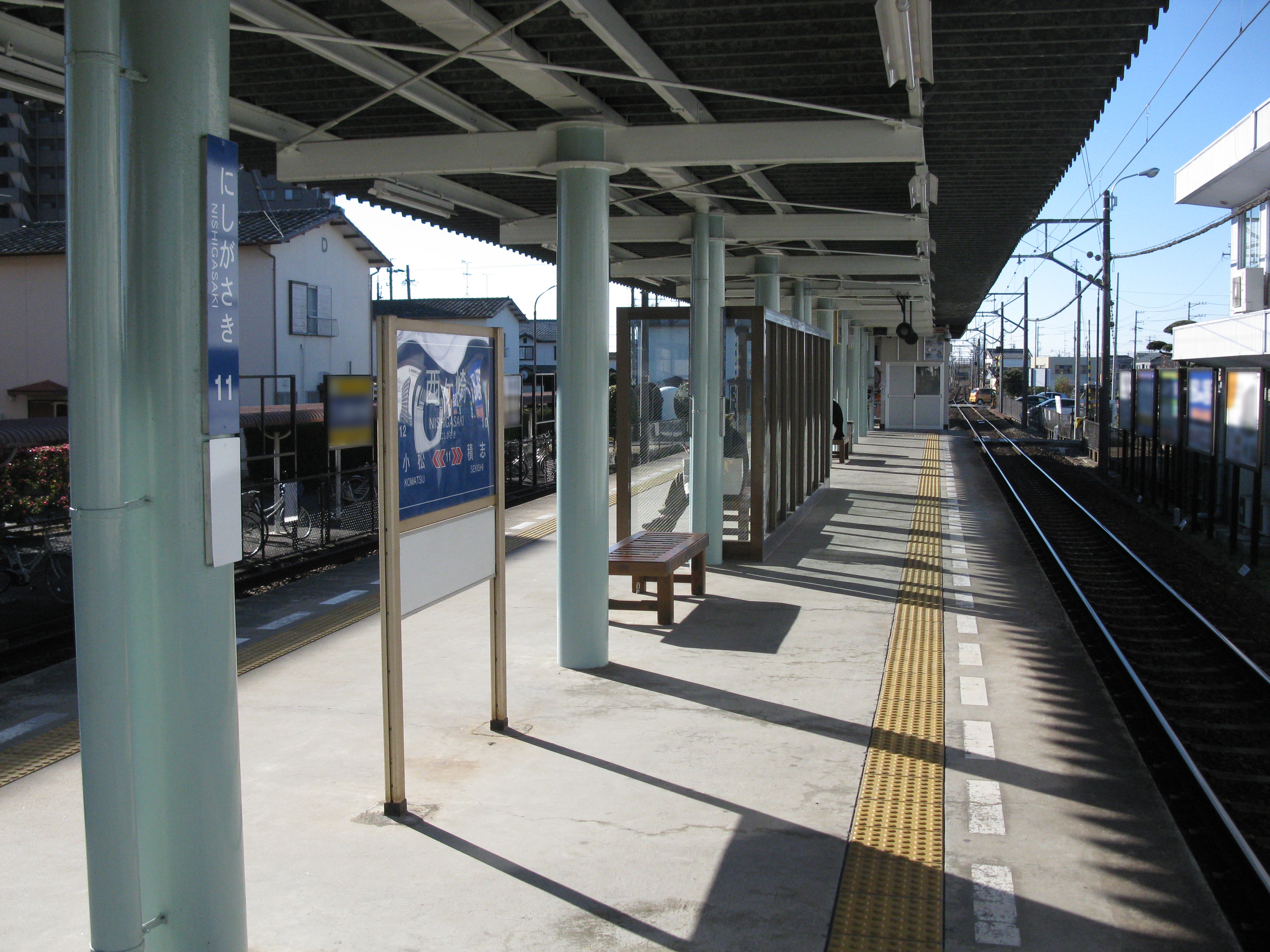
Platform

Enshū-Nishigasaki Station (遠州西ヶ崎駅, Enshū-Nishigasaki-eki) is a railway station in Chūō-ku, Hamamatsu, Shizuoka Prefecture, Japan, operated by the private railway company, Enshū Railway.

== Lines ==
Enshū-Nishigasaki Station is a station on the Enshū Railway Line and is 9.2 kilometers from the starting point of the line at Shin-Hamamatsu Station.

== Station layout ==
The station has a single unnumbered island platform connected to the station building by a level crossing. The station building has automated ticket machines, and automated turnstiles which accept the NicePass smart card, as well as ET Card, a magnetic card ticketing system. The station is attended.

=== Platforms ===
west	■ Enshū Railway Line	for Shin-Hamamatsu for Hamakita and Nishi-Kajima
east	■ Enshū Railway Line	siding

== Adjacent stations ==
«	Service	»
Enshū Railway
Enshū Railway Line
Sekishi	-	Enshū-Komatsu

== Station history ==
Enshū-Nishigasaki Station was established on December 6, 1909 as Nishigasaki Station (西ヶ崎駅, Nishigasaki-eki). It was renamed to its present name in April 1923, Freight services were discontinued from 1973.

== Passenger statistics ==
In fiscal 2017, the station was used by an average of 859 passengers daily (boarding passengers only).

== Surrounding area ==
- Enshu Railway sales office
- Nishinasaki Post Office

== See also ==
- List of railway stations in Japan
