= Fruit Park Station =

Railway station in Hamamatsu, Japan

Fruit Park Station フルーツパーク駅
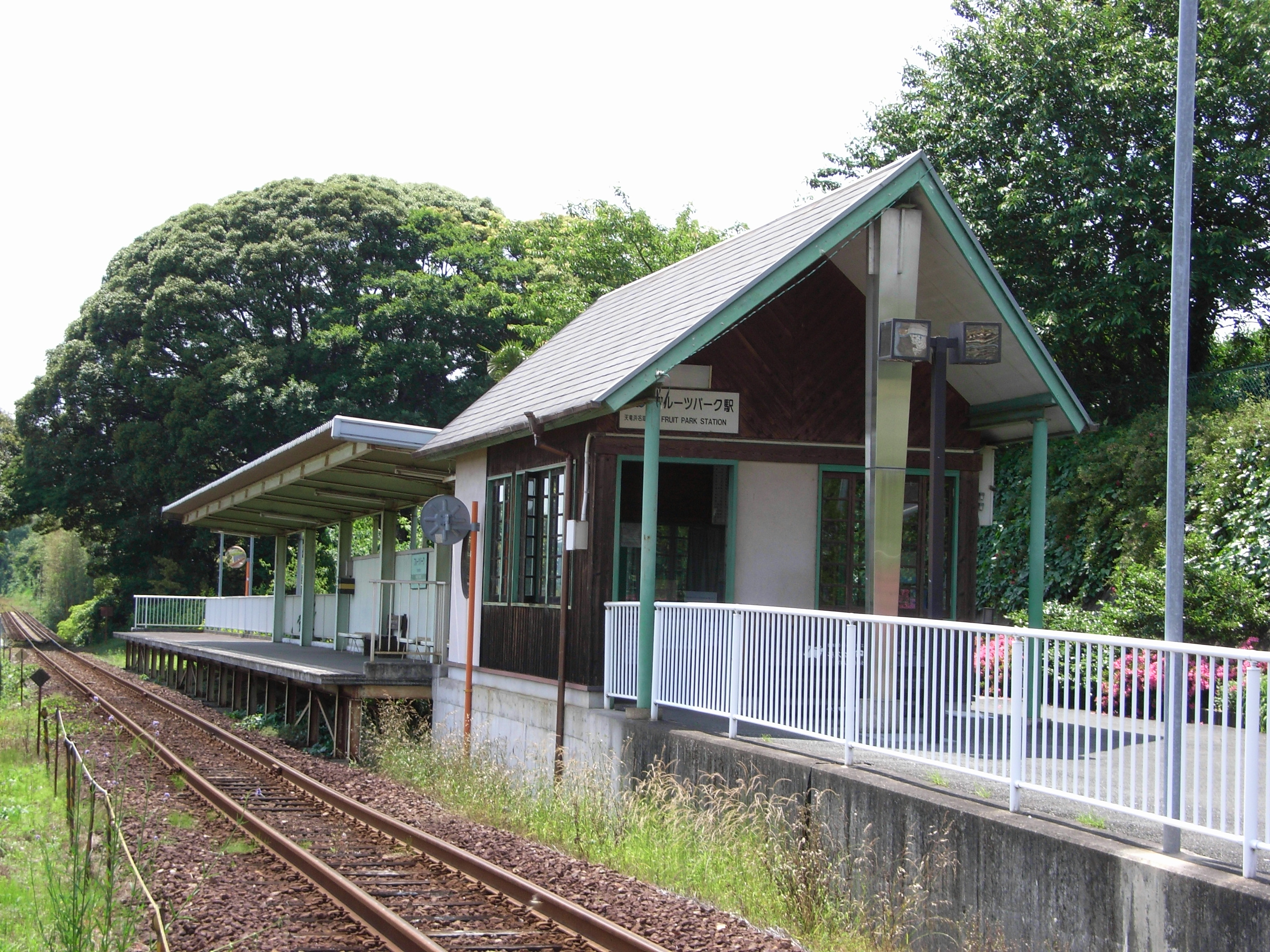
- Fruit Park Station in May 2009

General information
- Location: Miyakoda, Hamana-ku, Hamamatsu-shi, Shizuoka-ken 431-2102; Japan
- Coordinates: 34°50′04″N 137°43′56″E
- Operator: Tenryū Hamanako Railroad
- Line: ■ Tenryū Hamanako Line
- Distance: 36.2 kilometers from Kakegawa
- Platforms: 1 side platform

Other information
- Status: Unstaffed
- Website: Official website

History
- Opened: March 18, 1996

Passengers
- FY2016: 13 daily
Location
- Location within Shizuoka Prefecture Location within Japan

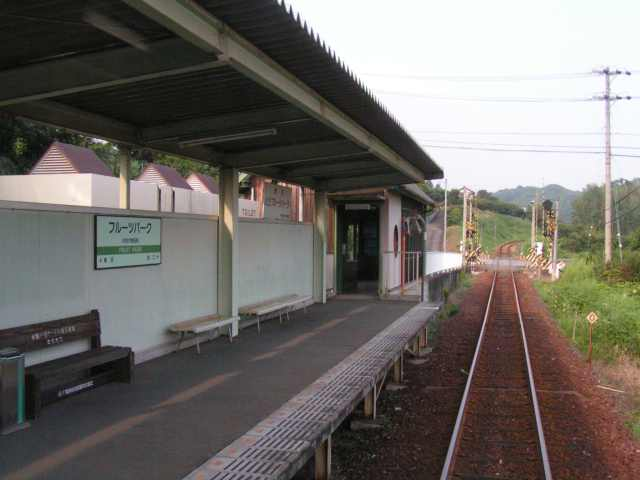
Platform

Fruitpark Station (フルーツパーク駅, Furūtsupāku-eki) is a railway station in Hamana-ku, Hamamatsu, Shizuoka Prefecture, Japan, operated by the third sector Tenryū Hamanako Railroad.

== Lines ==
Fruitpark Station is served by the Tenryū Hamanako Line, and is located 36.2 kilometers from the starting point of the line at Kakegawa Station.

== Station layout ==
The station has a single side platform with a small station building built directly on the platform. During national holidays it is a popular place for picnics and a station manager is temporarily installed.

== Adjacent stations ==
«	Service	»
Tenryū Hamanako Railroad
Tenryū Hamanako Line
Miyaguchi	-	Miyakoda

== Station history ==
Fruitpark Station was established on March 18, 1996.

== Passenger statistics ==
In fiscal 2016, the station was used by an average of 13 passengers daily (boarding passengers only).

== Surrounding area ==
- Hamamatsu Fruits Park Toki-no-sumika
- Japan National Route 362

== See also ==
- List of railway stations in Japan
