= Miyakoda Station =

Railway station in Hamamatsu, Japan

Miyakoda Station 都田駅
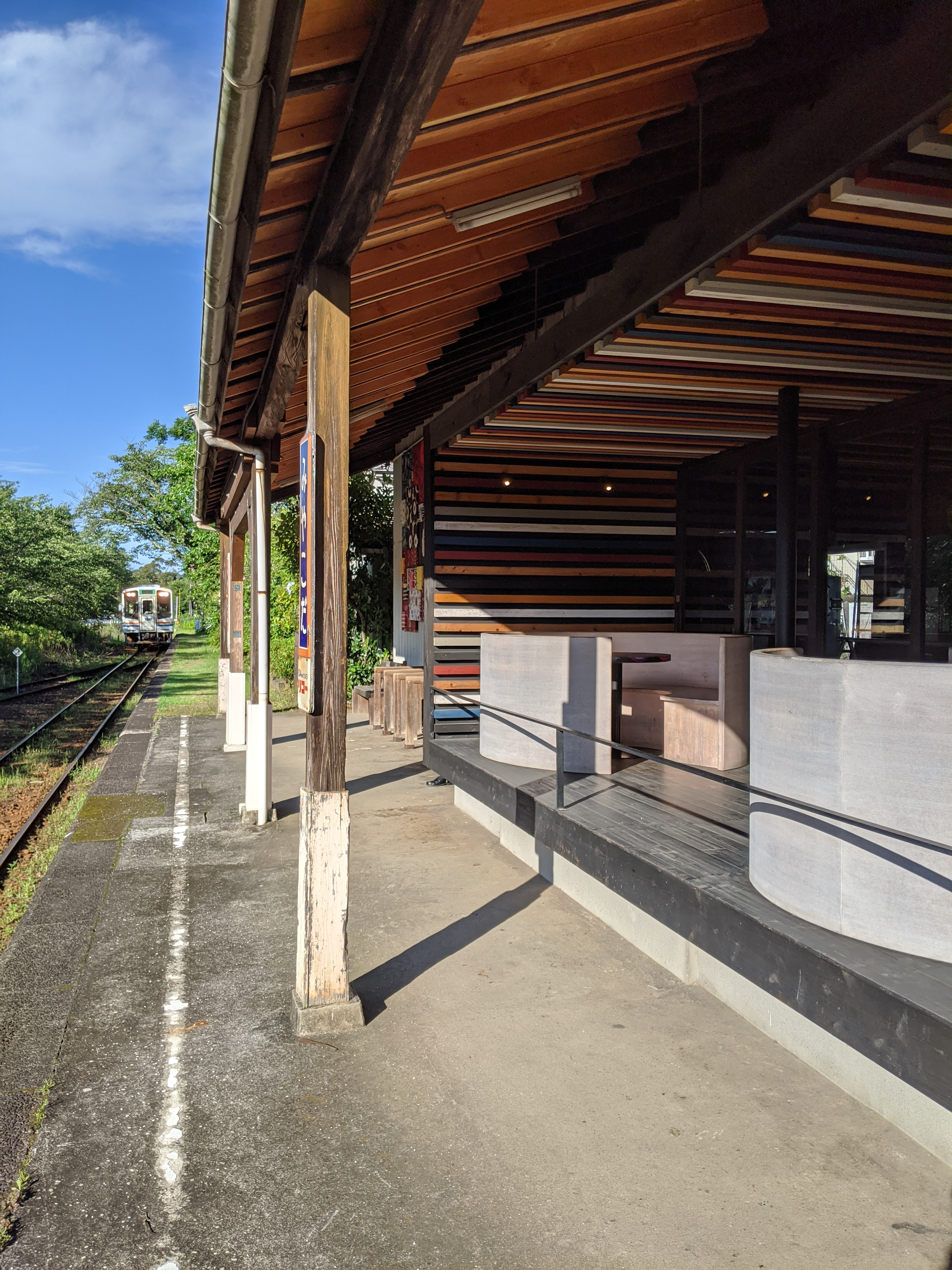
- Miyakoda Station in July 2020

General information
- Location: Miyakoda, Hamana-ku, Hamamatsu-shi, Shizuoka-ken 431-2102; Japan
- Coordinates: 34°49′42″N 137°43′6″E
- Operator: Tenryū Hamanako Railroad
- Line: ■ Tenryū Hamanako Line
- Distance: 37.7 kilometers from Kakegawa
- Platforms: 1 side platform

Other information
- Status: Unstaffed
- Website: Official website

History
- Opened: June 1, 1940

Passengers
- FY2016: 31 daily
Location
- Location within Shizuoka Prefecture Location within Japan

Miyakoda Station (都田駅, Miyakoda-eki) is a railway station in Hamana-ku, Hamamatsu, Shizuoka Prefecture, Japan, operated by the third sector Tenryū Hamanako Railroad.

== Lines ==
Miyakoda Station is served by the Tenryū Hamanako Line, and is located 37.7 kilometers from the starting point of the line at Kakegawa Station.

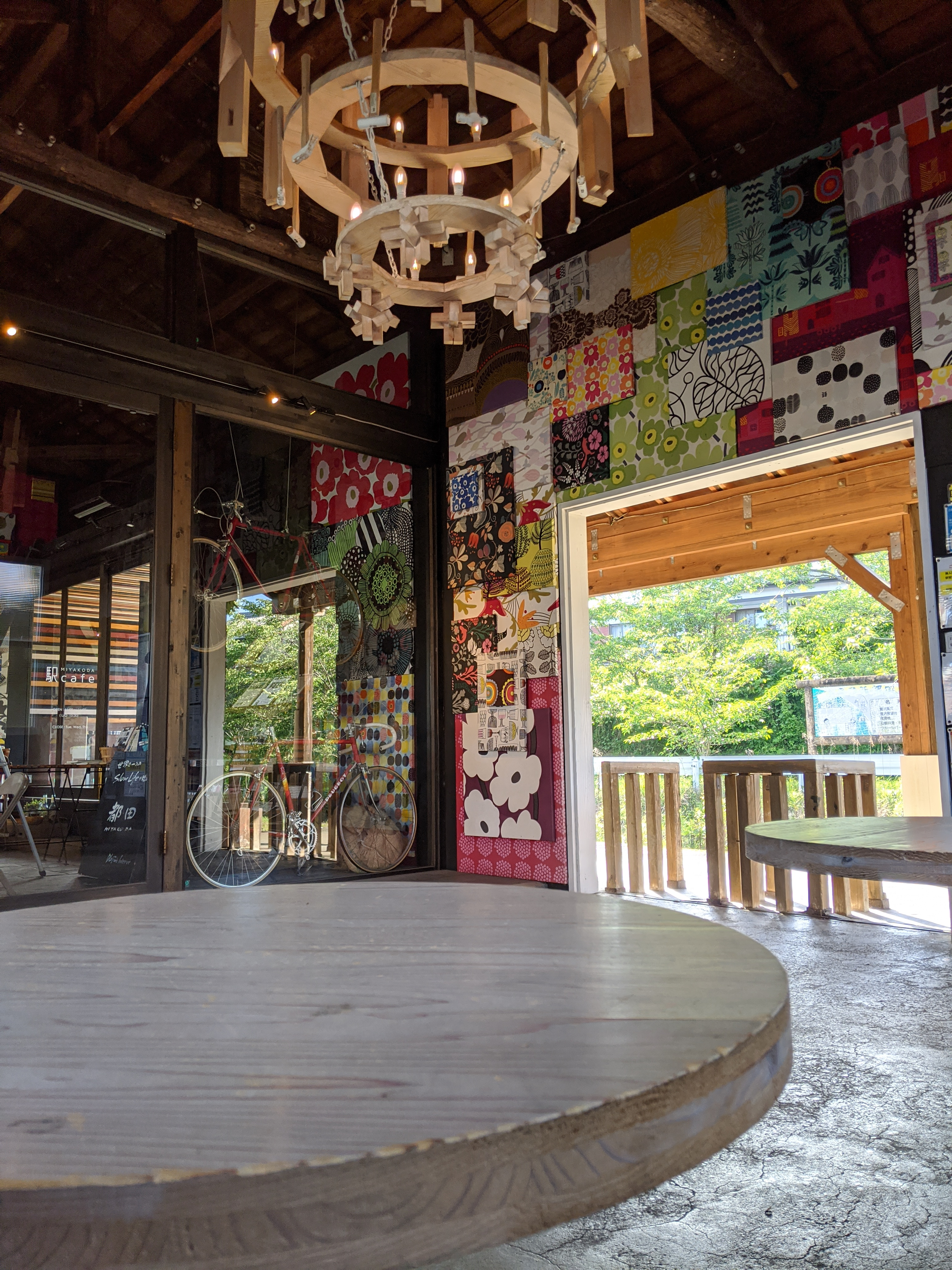
Miyakoda Station waiting area and cafe in July 2020

== Station layout ==
The station has a single side platform and a single-story station building, which also contains a Good Design Award (Japan)-winning cafe. The station originally was built with opposing side platforms, but one platform was removed to create a head shunt. The station is unattended, but a public restroom facility, phone booth and Entetsu Bus Line 46 and 56 stops are located just outside. Locally-grown grapes are sold seasonally out of the farm supply center adjacent to the station.

== Adjacent stations ==
| « | Service | » |
Tenryū Hamanako Railroad
Tenryū Hamanako Line
| Fruits Park | - | Hamamatsudaigakumae |

== Station History ==
Miyakoda Station was established on June 1, 1940 when the section of the Japan National Railways Futamata Line was extended from Enshū-Mori Station to Kanasashi Station. Scheduled freight services were discontinued from June 1970. On March 15, 1987, the station came under the control of the Tenryū Hamanako Line.

== Passenger statistics ==
In fiscal 2016, the station was used by an average of 31 passengers daily (boarding passengers only).

== Surrounding area ==
- Japan National Route 362
- Entetsu Bus Toda Line 46 and Hagioka Miyakoda Line 56 stops
- DLoFre's Miyakoda Station Cafe -- Good Design Award (Japan) 2015
- Miyakoda Junior High School
- Miyakoda Elementary School
- Miyakodaminami Elementary School
- Miyakoda Municipal Library
- Miyakoda Park

== See also ==
- List of railway stations in Japan
