= Sekishi Station =

Railway station in Hamamatsu, Japan

Sekishi Station 積志駅
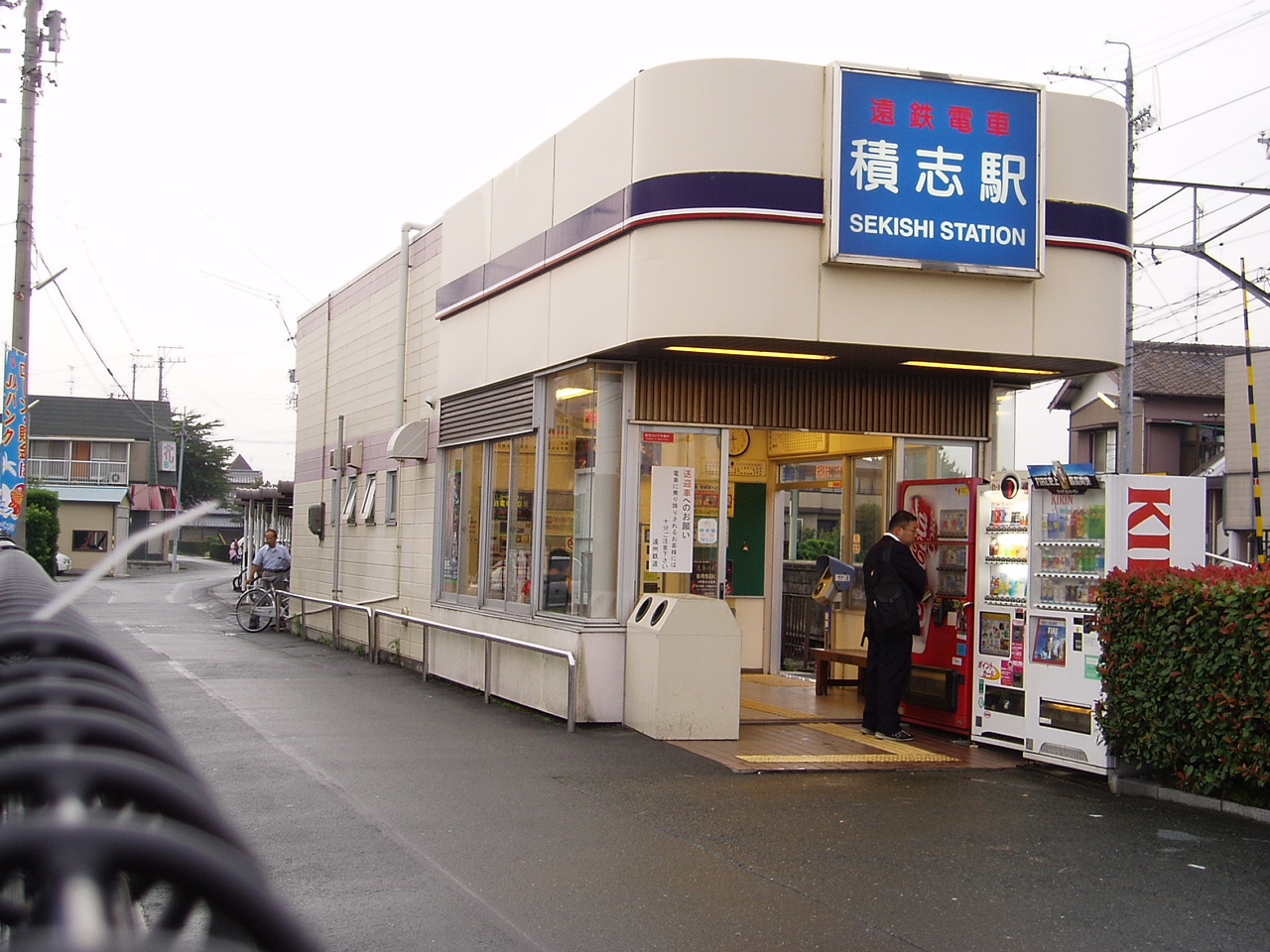
- Sekishi Station in July 2006

General information
- Location: Sekishi 814, Chūō-ku, Hamamatsu-shi, Shizuoka-ken 431-3114; Japan
- Coordinates: 34°46′3.89″N 137°45′47.35″E
- Operator: Enshū Railway
- Line: ■ Enshū Railway Line
- Distance: 1.6 km from Shin-Hamamatsu
- Platforms: 2 side platforms

Other information
- Status: Unstaffed
- Station code: 10

History
- Opened: December 6, 1909
- Former names: Matsuki (to 1926), Enshū-Matsuki (to 1964)

Passengers
- FY2017: 907 (daily)
Location
- Location within Shizuoka Prefecture Location within Japan

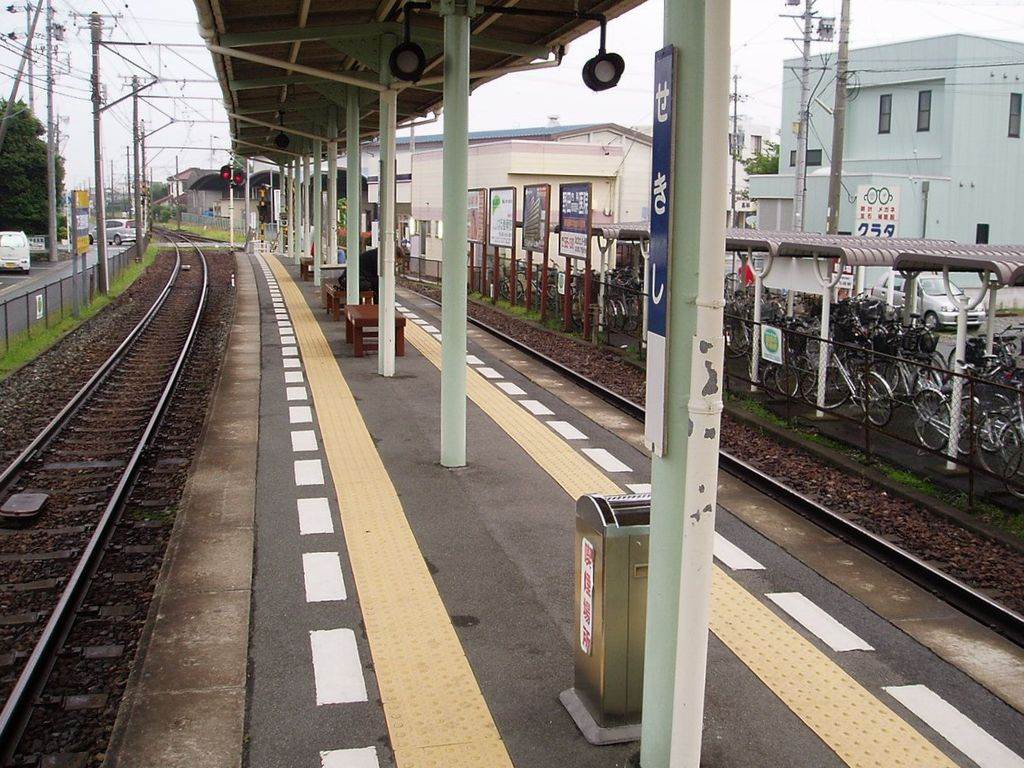
Platform

Sekishi Station (積志駅, Sekishi-eki) is a railway station in Chūō-ku, Hamamatsu, Shizuoka Prefecture, Japan, operated by the private railway company, Enshū Railway.

== Lines ==
Sekishi Station is a station on the Enshū Railway Line and is 7.8 kilometers from the starting point of the line at Shin-Hamamatsu Station.

== Station layout ==
The station has a single island platform connected to the station building by a level crossing. The station building has automated ticket machines, and automated turnstiles which accept the NicePass smart card, as well as ET Card, a magnetic card ticketing system. The station is unattended.

=== Platforms ===
1	■ Enshū Railway Line	for Hamakita and Nishi-Kajima
2	■ Enshū Railway Line	for Shin-Hamamatsu

== Adjacent stations ==
«	Service	»
Enshū Railway
Enshū Railway Line
Saginomiya	-	Enshū-Nishigasaki

== Station history ==
Sekishi Station was established on December 6, 1909 as Matsuki Station (松木駅, Matsuki-eki). In 1926, the station was renamed Enshū-Matsuki Station (遠州松木駅, Enshū-Matsuki-eki). It gained its present name in June 1964. The station has been unattended since 1974.

== Passenger statistics ==
In fiscal 2017, the station was used by an average of 907 passengers daily (boarding passengers only).

== Surrounding area ==
- Sekishi Elementary School
- Sekishi Junior High School

== See also ==
- List of railway stations in Japan
