= Miyaguchi Station =

Railway station in Hamamatsu, Japan

Miyaguchi Station 宮口駅
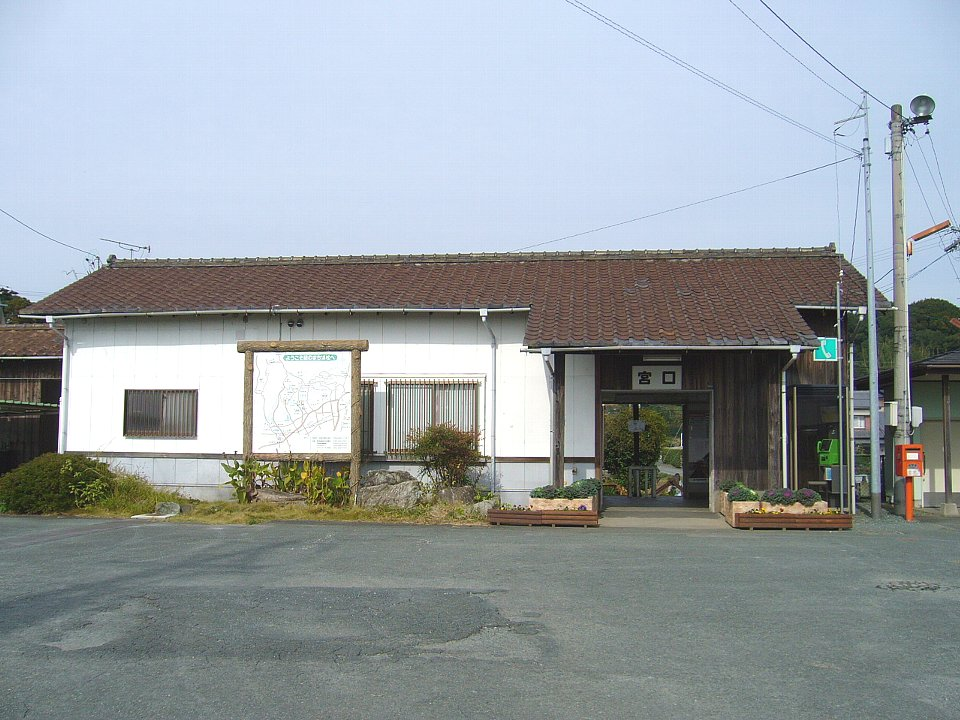
- Miyaguchi Station in July 2008

General information
- Location: Miyaguchi, Hamana-ku, Hamamatsu-shi, Shizuoka-ken 434-0004; Japan
- Coordinates: 34.830346°N 137.773783°E
- Operator: Tenryū Hamanako Railroad
- Line: ■ Tenryū Hamanako Line
- Distance: 32.38 kilometers from Kakegawa
- Platforms: 2 side platforms

Other information
- Status: Unstaffed
- Website: Official website

History
- Opened: June 1, 1940

Passengers
- FY2016: 125 daily
Location
- Location within Shizuoka Prefecture Location within Japan

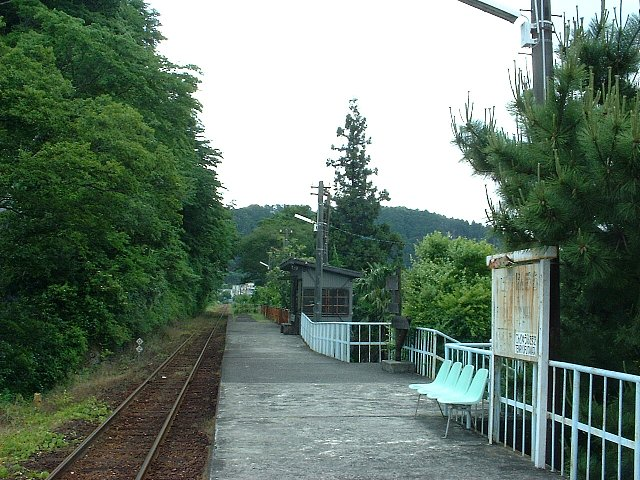
Platform

Miyaguchi Station (宮口駅, Miyaguchi-eki) is a railway station in Hamana-ku, Hamamatsu, Shizuoka Prefecture, Japan, operated by the third sector Tenryū Hamanako Railroad.

== Lines ==
Miyaguchi Station is served by the Tenryū Hamanako Line, and is located 32.3 kilometers from the starting point of the line at Kakegawa Station.

== Station layout ==
The station has two opposed side platforms connected to a small station building by a level crossing. The station is unattended. The station building and platform are protected as Registered Tangible Cultural Properties of Japan since 2011.

== Adjacent stations ==
«	Service	»
Tenryū Hamanako Railroad
Tenryū Hamanako Line
Gansuiji	-	Fruit Park

== Station History ==
Miyaguchi Station was established on June 1, 1940 when the section of the Japan National Railways Futamata Line was extended from Enshū-Mori Station to Kanasashi Station. Scheduled freight services were discontinued from June 1962. On March 15, 1987, the station came under the control of the Tenryū Hamanako Line.

== Passenger statistics ==
In fiscal 2016, the station was used by an average of 125 passengers daily (boarding passengers only).

== Surrounding area ==
- Koshin-ji
- Japan National Route 362

== See also ==
- List of railway stations in Japan
