= Gansuiji Station =

Railway station in Hamamatsu, Japan

Gansuiji Station 岩水寺駅
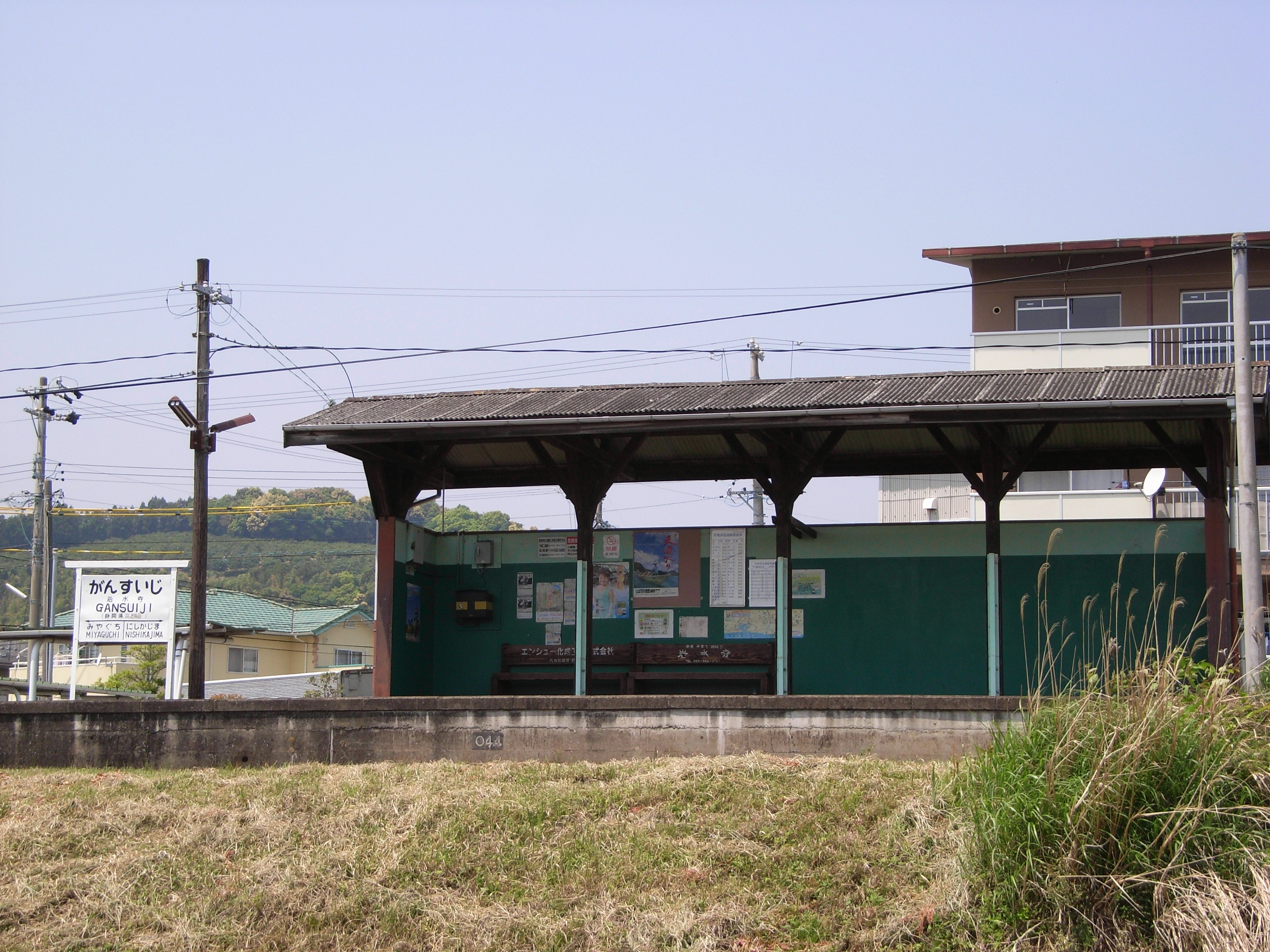
- Gansuiji Station in May 2009

General information
- Location: Negata, Hamana-ku, Hamamatsu-shi, Shizuoka-ken 434-0016; Japan
- Coordinates: 34.837736°N 137.792409°E
- Operator: Tenryū Hamanako Railroad
- Line: ■ Tenryū Hamanako Line
- Distance: 30.3 kilometers from Kakegawa
- Platforms: 1 side platform

Other information
- Status: Unstaffed
- Website: Official website

History
- Opened: June 1, 1940

Passengers
- FY2016: 38 daily
Location
- Location within Shizuoka Prefecture Location within Japan

Gansuiji Station (岩水寺駅, Gansuiji-eki) is a railway station in Hamana-ku, Hamamatsu, Shizuoka Prefecture, Japan, operated by the third sector Tenryū Hamanako Railroad.

== Lines ==
Gansuiji Station is served by the Tenryū Hamanako Line, and is located 30.3 kilometers from the starting point of the line at Kakegawa Station.

== Station layout ==
The station has one side platform serving a single bi-directional track with a small station building. The station is unattended. The station building and platform are protected as Registered Tangible Cultural Properties of Japan since 2011.

== Adjacent stations ==
«	Service	»
Tenryū Hamanako Railroad
Tenryū Hamanako Line
Nishi-Kajima	-	Miyaguchi

== Station History ==
Gansuiji Station was established on June 1, 1940 when the section of the Japan National Railways Futamata Line was extended from Enshū-Mori Station to Kanasashi Station. Small parcel services were discontinued from June 1970, and the station was unstaffed after that time. Freight services were discontinued in April 1973. On March 15, 1987, the station came under the control of the Tenryū Hamanako Line.

== Passenger statistics ==
In fiscal 2016, the station was used by an average of 38 passengers daily (boarding passengers only).

== Surrounding area ==
- Gansu-ji

== See also ==
- List of railway stations in Japan
