= Enshū-Komatsu Station =

Railway station in Hamamatsu, Japan

Enshū-Komatsu Station 遠州小松駅
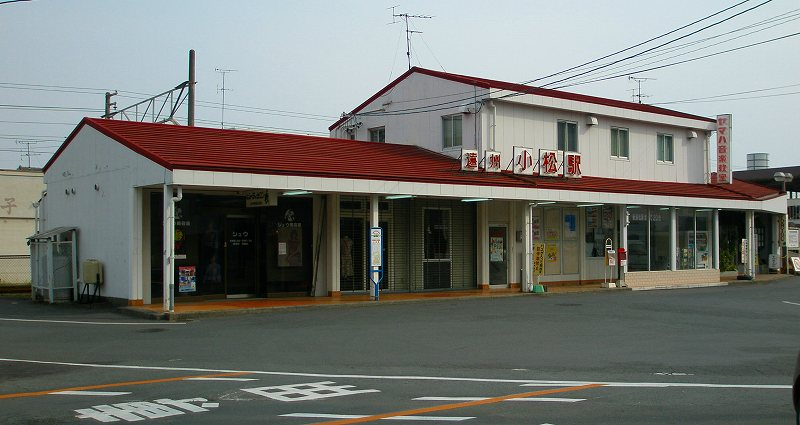
- Enshū-Komatsu Station

General information
- Location: Komatsu 4500-1, Hamana-ku, Hamamatsu-shi, Shizuoka-ken 434-0042; Japan
- Coordinates: 34°47′4.54″N 137°46′40.91″E
- Operator: Enshū Railway
- Line: ■ Enshū Railway Line
- Distance: 10.2 km from Shin-Hamamatsu
- Platforms: 1 island platforms

Other information
- Status: Staffed
- Station code: 12

History
- Opened: December 6, 1909
- Former names: Komatsu (to 1923)

Passengers
- FY2017: 1,041 (daily)
Location
- Location within Shizuoka Prefecture Location within Japan

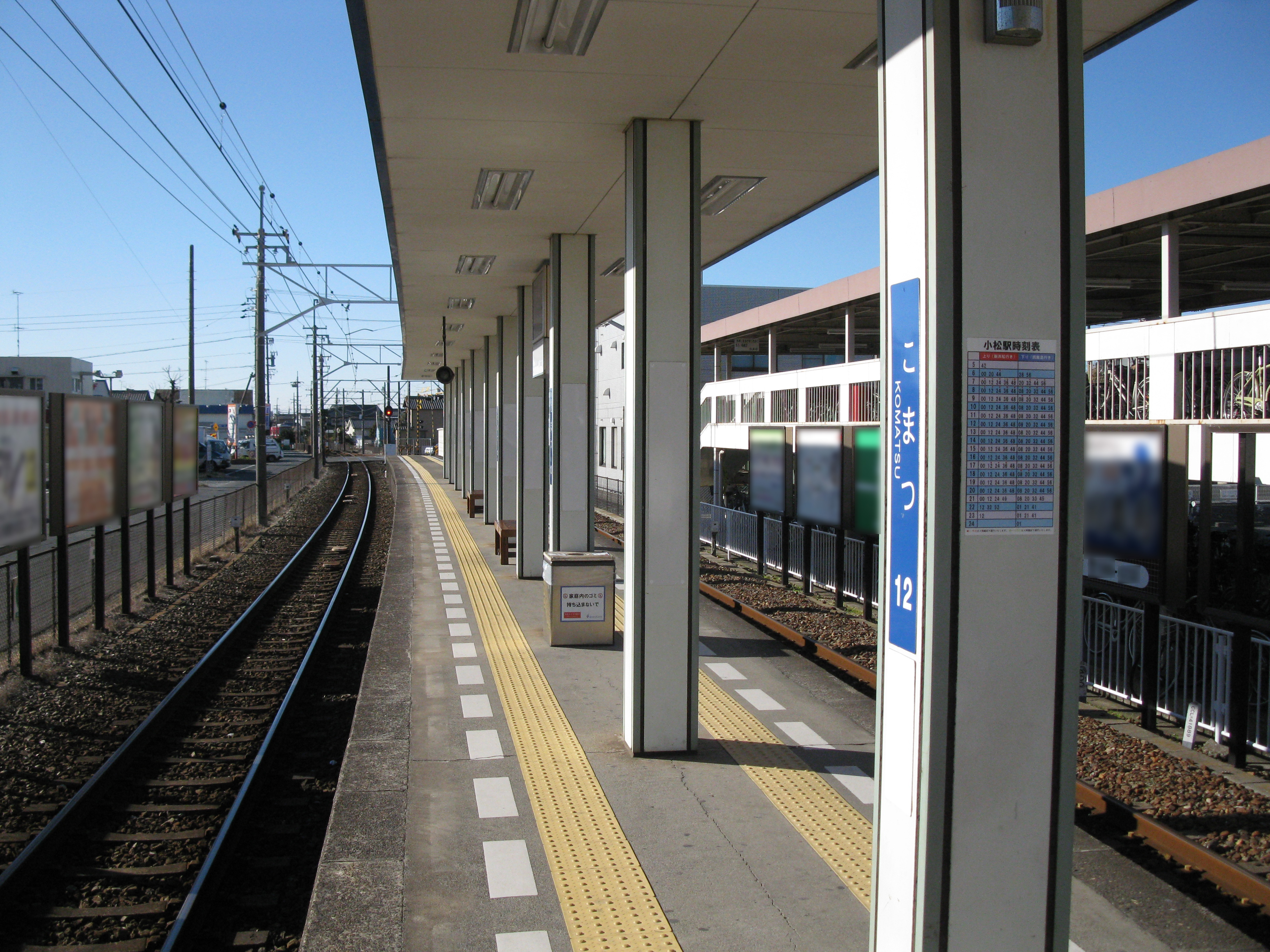
Platform

Enshū-Komatsu Station (遠州小松駅, Enshū-Komatsu-eki) is a railway station in Hamana-ku, Hamamatsu, Shizuoka Prefecture, Japan, operated by the private railway company, Enshū Railway.

== Lines ==
Enshū-Komatsu Station is a station on the Enshū Railway Line and is 10.2 kilometers from the starting point of the line at Shin-Hamamatsu Station.

== Station layout ==
The station has a single island platform, connected to a two-story wooden station building by a level crossing. The station building has automated ticket machines, and automated turnstiles which accept the NicePass smart card, as well as ET Card, a magnetic card ticketing system. The station is attended.

=== Platforms ===
1	■ Enshū Railway Line	for Hamakita and Nishi-Kajima
2	■ Enshū Railway Line	for Shin-Hamamatsu

== Adjacent stations ==
«	Service	»
Enshū Railway
Enshū Railway Line
Enshū-Nishigasaki	-	Hamakita

== Station History ==
Enshū-Komatsu Station was established on December 6, 1909 as Komatsu Station (小松駅, Komtasu-eki). It was renamed to its present name in April 1923, Freight services were discontinued from 1973. The head offices of the Enshū Railway were temporarily relocated to this station during World War II. All freight operations were discontinued in 1973. The station building was reconstructed in 1979.

== Passenger statistics ==
In fiscal 2017, the station was used by an average of 1,041 passengers daily (boarding passengers only).

== Surrounding area ==
- Yamaha Hamakita factory

== See also ==
- List of railway stations in Japan
