= Lake Hamana =

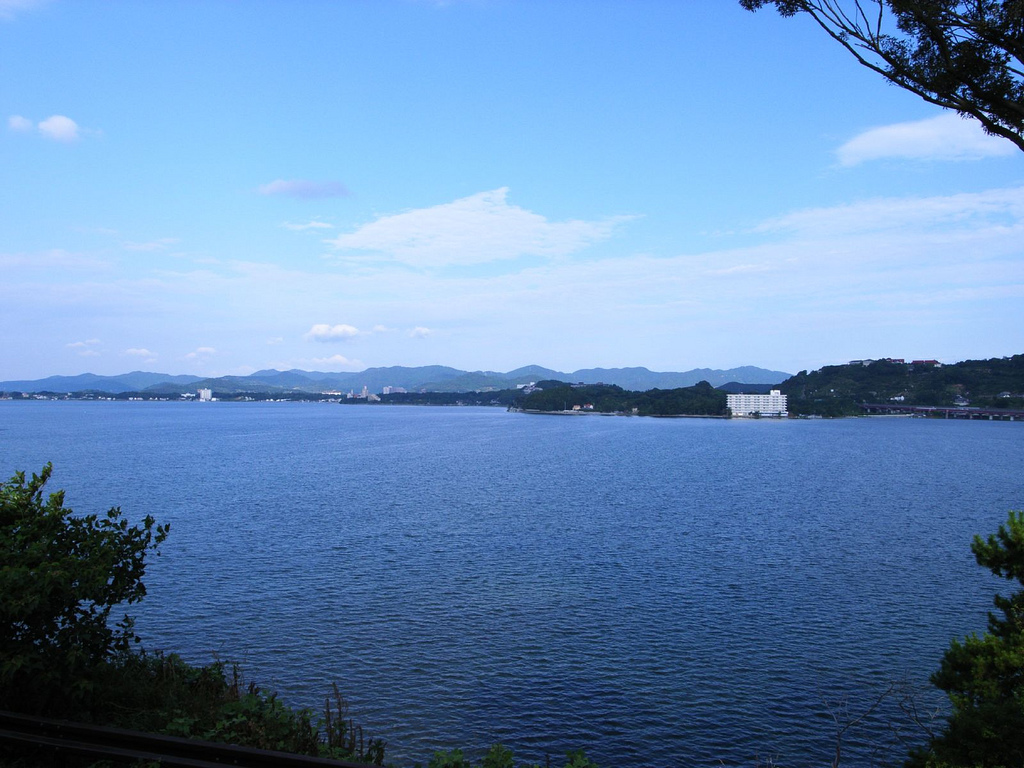
- A view from Hamanako Service Area

- Location within Japan

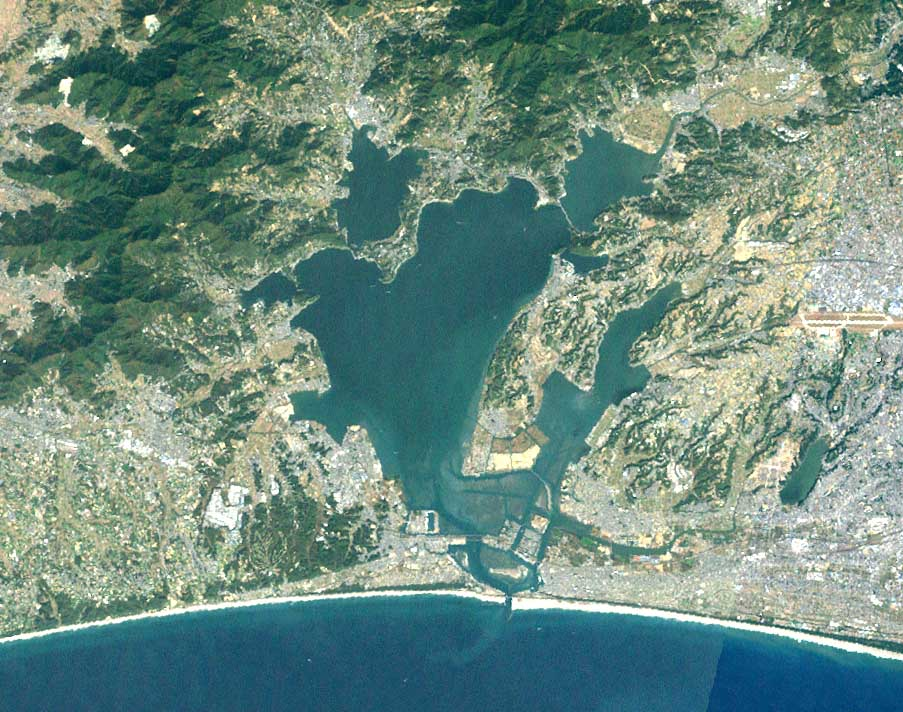
- Landsat image
- Location: Shizuoka Prefecture
- Coordinates: 34°44′28″N 137°34′11″E
- Type: Brackish lagoon
- Primary outflows: Pacific Ocean
- Basin countries: Japan
- Surface area: 65.0 km^{2} (25.1 sq mi)
- Average depth: 4.8 m (16 ft)
- Max. depth: 16.6 m (54 ft)
- Water volume: 0.35 km^{3} (280,000 acre⋅ft)
- Shore length^{1}: 114 km (71 mi)
- Surface elevation: 0 m (0 ft)
- ^{1} Shore length is not a well-defined measure.

Lake Hamana (浜名湖, Hamana-ko) is a brackish lagoon in Shizuoka Prefecture, Japan. Formerly a true lake, it is now connected to the Pacific Ocean by a channel. As an internal body of water, it is considered Japan's tenth-largest lake (by area). It spans the boundaries of the cities of Hamamatsu and Kosai.

== Data ==
The lake has an area of 65.0 km^{2} and holds 0.35 km^{3} of water. Its circumference is 114 km. At its deepest point, the water is 16.6 m deep. The surface is at sea level.

== History ==
In ancient times, Lake Hamana was a freshwater lake. However, the 1498 Meiō Nankaidō earthquake altered the topography of the area and connected the lake to the ocean. As a result, the water in the lake is now brackish.

At the end of World War II two experimental Type 4 Chi-To tanks were dumped into the lake to avoid capture by Occupation forces. One was recovered by the US Army, but the other was left in the lake. In 2013, unsuccessful efforts were made to locate the remaining tank.

== Gallery ==
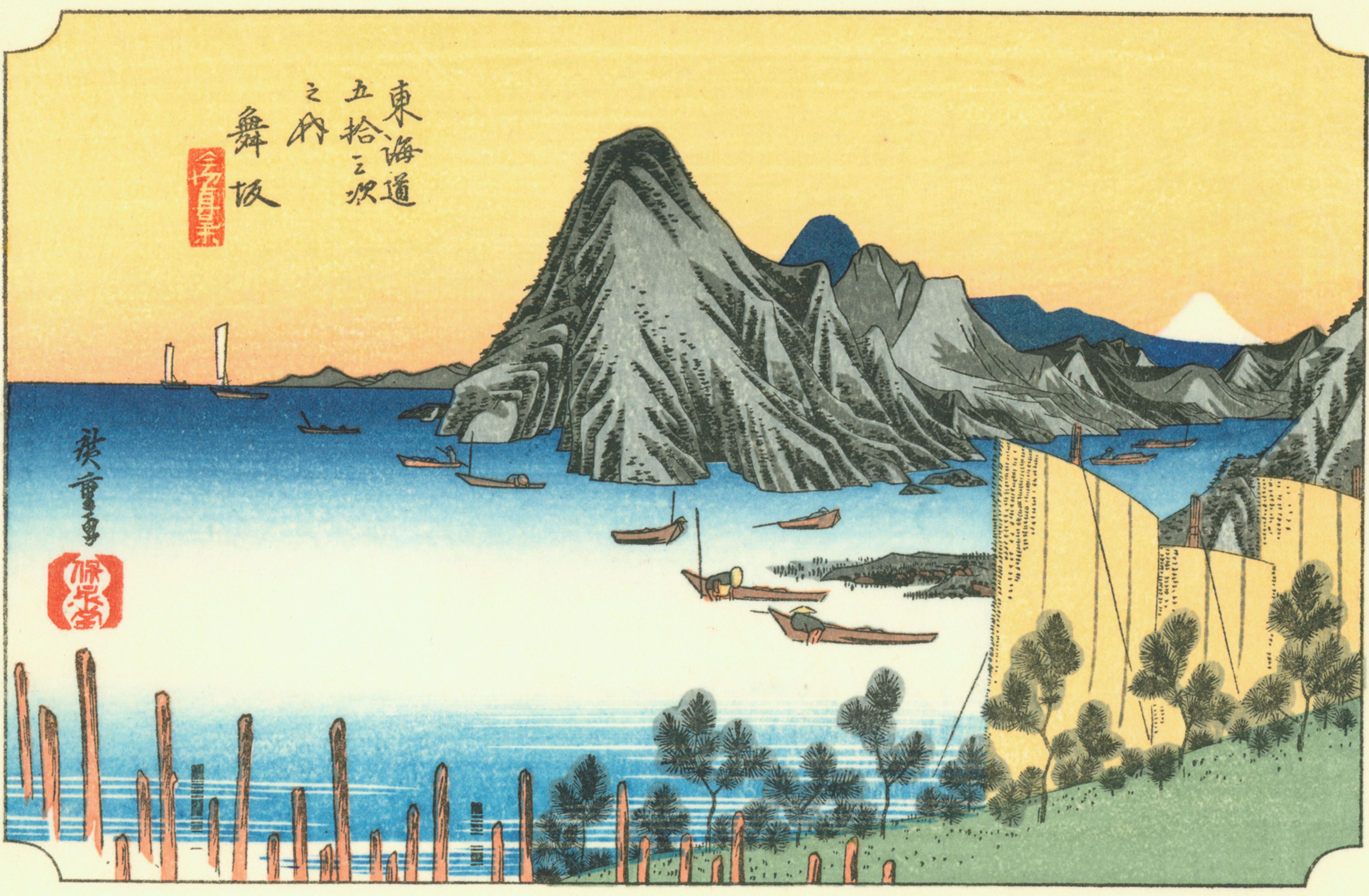
Ukiyo-e by Hiroshige

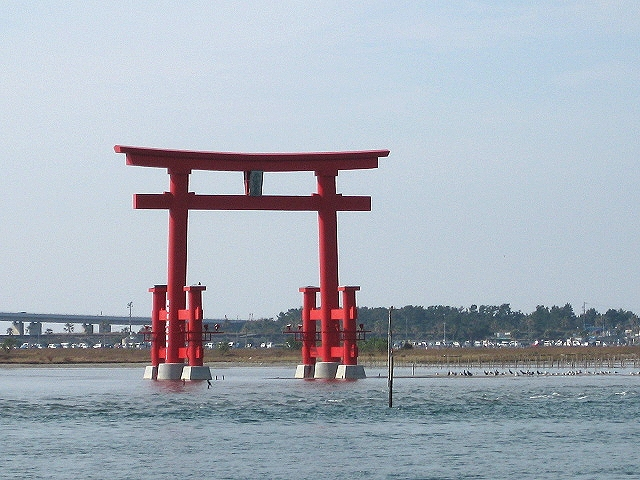
Torii on the lake

View of the lake

== Sources ==
This article incorporates material from the article 浜名湖 (Hamanako) in the Japanese Wikipedia, retrieved on December 11, 2007.
