= Hamakita Station =

Railway station in Hamamatsu, Japan

Hamakita Station 浜北駅
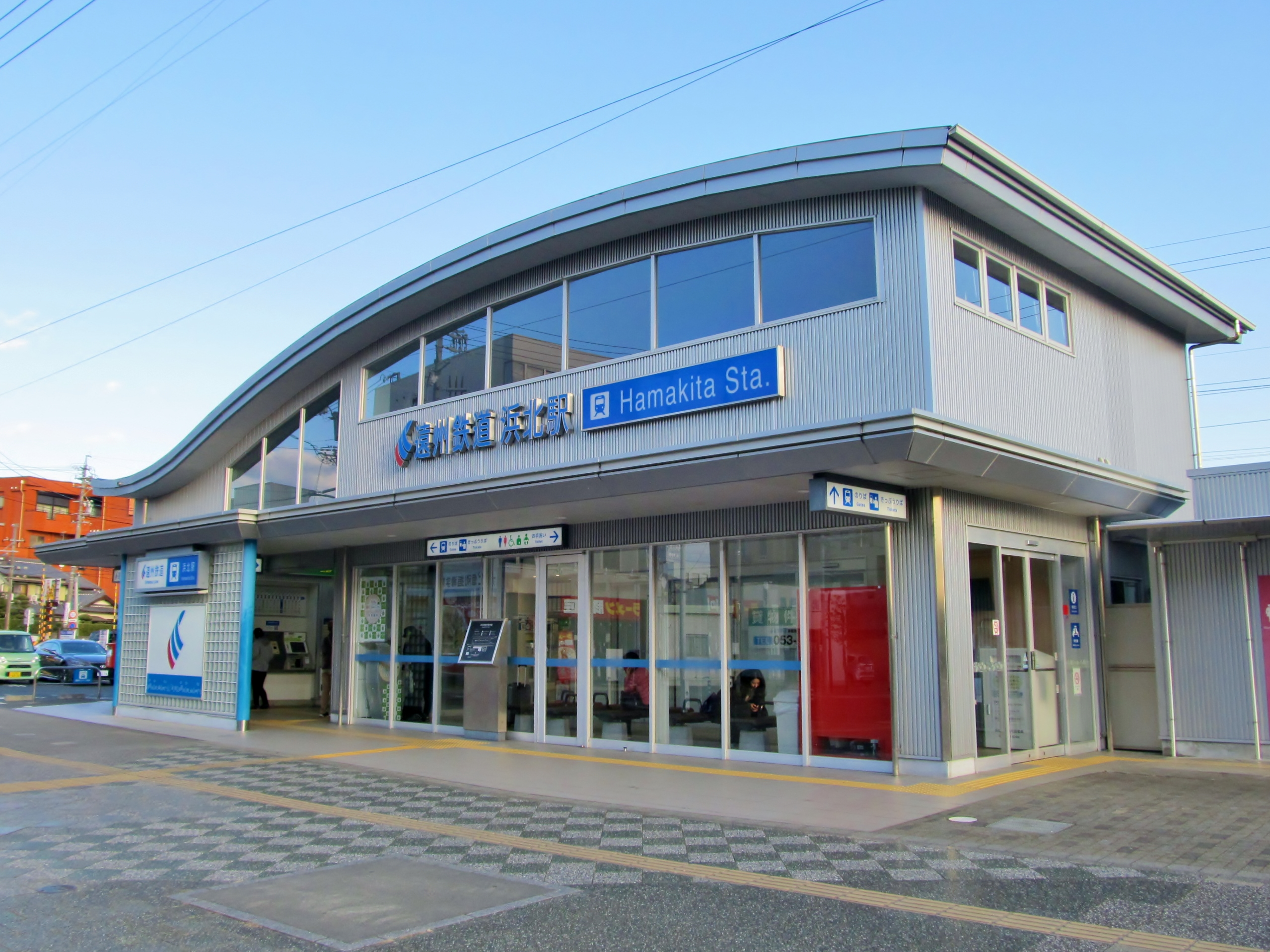
- Hamakita Station, 2 January 2025

General information
- Location: Numa 54-1, Hamana-ku, Hamamatsu-shi, Shizuoka-ken 434-0037; Japan
- Coordinates: 34°47′30.01″N 137°47′4.30″E
- Operator: Enshū Railway
- Line: ■ Enshū Railway Line
- Distance: 11.2 km from Shin-Hamamatsu
- Platforms: 1 island platforms

Other information
- Status: Staffed
- Station code: 13

History
- Opened: December 6, 1909
- Former names: Kibune (to 1923); Enshū-Kibune (to 1977)

Passengers
- FY2017: 1,606 (daily)
Location
- Location within Shizuoka Prefecture Location within Japan

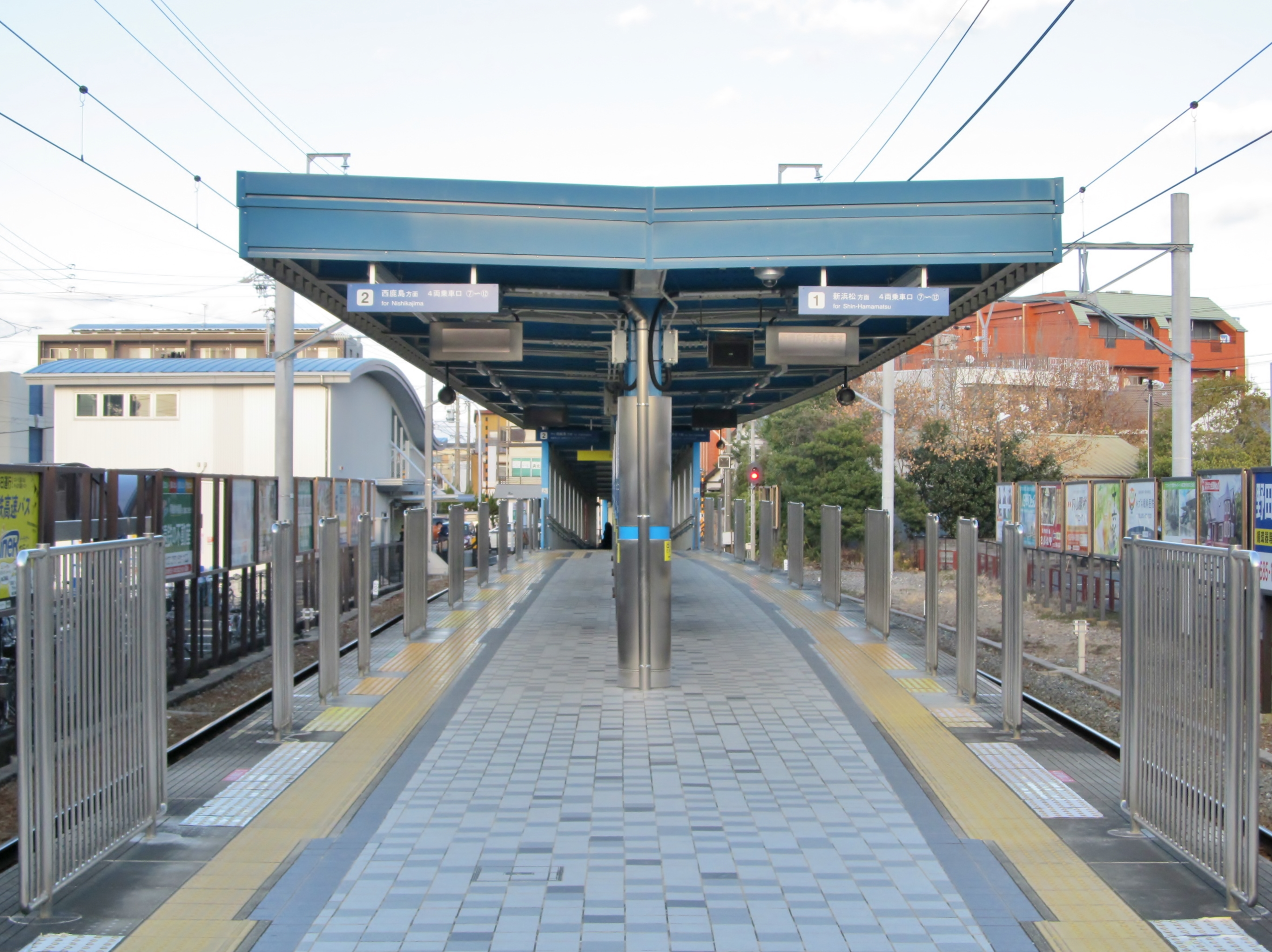
Platform

Hamakita Station (浜北駅, Hamakita-eki) is a railway station in Hamana-ku, Hamamatsu, Shizuoka Prefecture, Japan, operated by the private railway company, Enshū Railway.

== Lines ==
Hamakita Station is a station on the Enshū Railway Line and is 11.2 kilometers from the starting point of the line at Shin-Hamamatsu Station.

== Station layout ==
The station has a single island platform, connected to a two-story station building. The station building has automated ticket machines, and automated turnstiles which accept the NicePass smart card, as well as ET Card, a magnetic card ticketing system. The station is attended.

=== Platforms ===
1	■ Enshū Railway Line	for Shin-Hamamatsu
2	■ Enshū Railway Line	for Nishi-Kajima

== Adjacent stations ==
«	Service	»
Enshū Railway
Enshū Railway Line
Enshū-Komatsu	-	Misono-Chūō-kōen

== Station history ==
Hamakita Station was established on December 6, 1909 as Kibune Station (貴布禰駅, Kibune-eki). It was renamed Enshū-Kibune Station (遠州貴布禰駅, Enshū-Kibune-eki) in April 1923. All freight operations were discontinued in 1973. The station was given its current name in 1977, when the station building was reconstructed into a two-story structure housing a small shopping center. This shopping center closed in 2003.

== Passenger statistics ==
In fiscal 2017, the station was used by an average of 1,707 passengers daily (boarding passengers only).

== Surrounding area ==
- Yamaha Hamakita factory

== See also ==
- List of railway stations in Japan
