= Japan National Route 362 =

National highway in Japan

National Route 362
- 国道362号
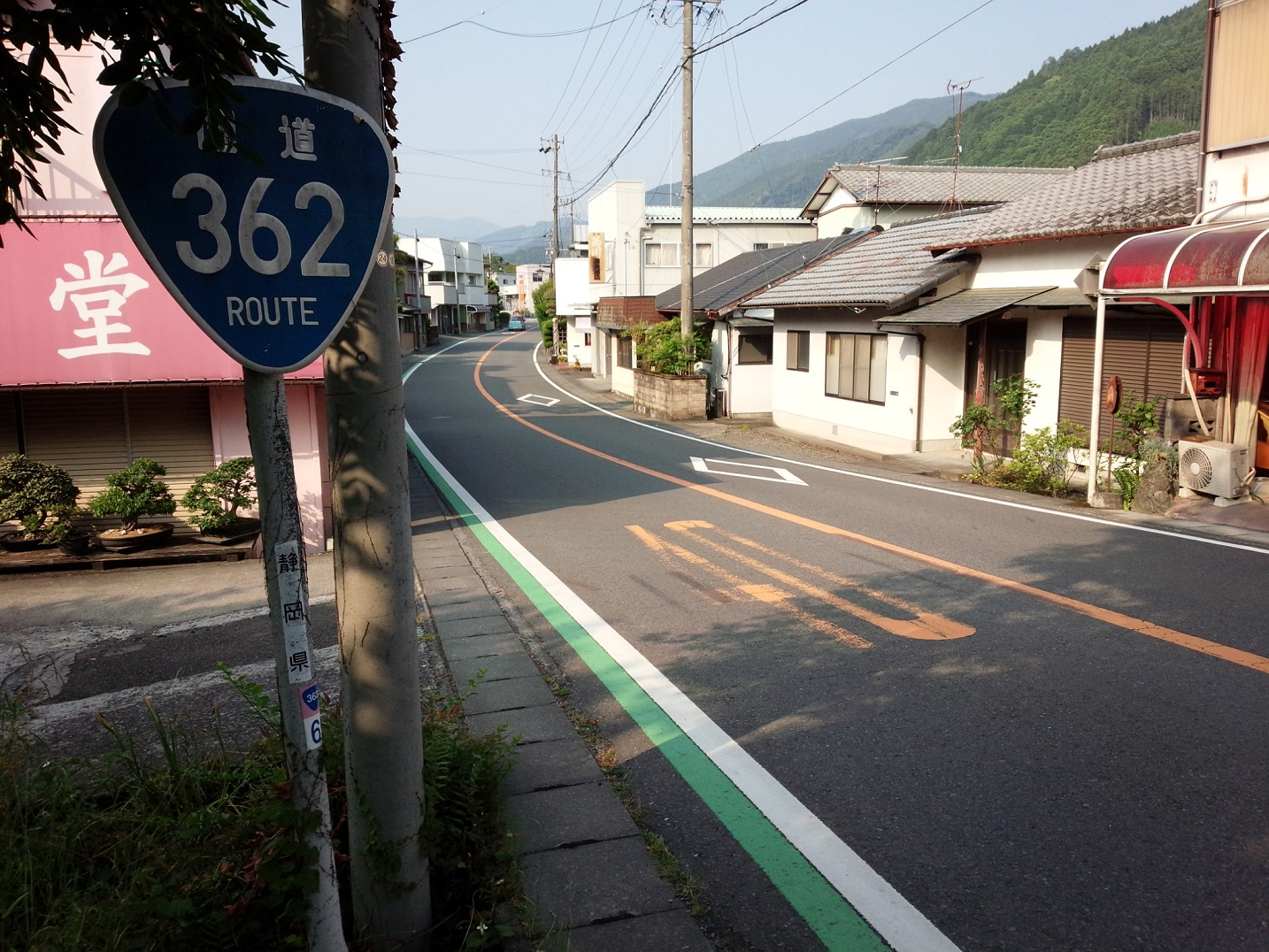

Route information
- Length: 157.2 km (97.7 mi)
- Existed: 1975–present

Major junctions
- West end: National Route 151 in Toyokawa, Aichi
- East end: National Route 1 in Aoi-ku, Shizuoka

Location
- Country: Japan

Highway system
- National highways of Japan; Expressways of Japan
← National Route 361	→ National Route 363

National Route 362 is a national highway of Japan connecting Toyokawa, Aichi and Aoi-ku, Shizuoka in Japan, with a total length of 157.2 km (97.68 mi).
