= Yamishibai: Japanese Ghost Stories =

Japanese anime television series

- Promotional poster of Yamishibai: Japanese Ghost Stories, featuring the Kamishibaiya

闇芝居 (Yami Shibai)
- Genre: Horror; Anthology
- Anime television series
- Directed by: Tomoya Takashima (S1); ILCA (S2, 5, 7); Noboru Iguchi (S2E2); Takashi Shimizu (S2E6); Shoichiro Masumoto (S2E10); Takashi Taniguchi (S3); Tomohisa Ishikawa (S3); Masaya Kaneko (S4); Kunpei Yanagawa (S6); Kenichi Sugimoto (S7–10); Akira Funada (S8–17)
- Produced by: Nobuyuki Hosoya (S1–6); Naoko Kunisada (S1); Aiko Okamoto (S2); Motoki Hirose (S3–5); Kenji Sakurai (S3); Satoshi Umetsu (S7–10); Akira Funada (S6–7, 9–17); Reina Fujisaki (S8); Norio Yamakawa (S11–17); Takuya Iwasaki (S11–17)
- Written by: Hiromu Kumamoto (S1–4, 6–17); Mitsuhiro Sasaki (S6–17); Kanako Ishigami (S8–10, 15–17); Choji Yoshikawa (S11–14); Saori Aoki (S12–14); Satoko Kishino (S3, 5); Ayako Yamaguchi (S5, 7); Saki Kuniyoshi (S7–8); Brazily Anne Yamada (S2); Yuko Ichiki (S5); Norikatsu Kodama (S8); Nishioka Toniru (S9); Dan Osano (S13); Kunpei Yanagawa (S6); Norio Yamakawa (S11); Noboru Iguchi (S2E2); Takashi Shimizu (S2E6); Shoichiro Masumoto (S2E10)
- Music by: nico
- Studio: ILCA
- Licensed by: Crunchyroll (streaming); NA: Sentai Filmworks (S1–2); SEA: Muse Communication (S1–10)
- Original network: TV Tokyo, AT-X
- Original run: July 15, 2013 – present
- Episodes: 221
- Anime television series

Ninja Collection
- Directed by: Akira Funada
- Produced by: Satoshi Umetsu; Akira Funada
- Written by: Hiromu Kumamoto; Mitsuhiro Sasaki; Rei Tsuruga
- Studio: ILCA
- Original network: TV Tokyo, animeteleto
- Original run: July 13, 2020 – October 26, 2020
- Episodes: 13
- icon

Yamishibai: Japanese Ghost Stories, also known in Japan as Yami Shibai (闇芝居, Yami Shibai; lit. Dark Play) and Theater of Darkness, is a Japanese anime television series. The first season was directed by Tomoya Takashima, with scripts written by Hiromu Kumamoto and produced by ILCA. Each episode was animated to mimic the kamishibai method of story-telling. The series is organized into a collection of shorts with each episode being only a few minutes in length. Each episode features a different tale based on myths and urban legends of Japanese origin.

The first season aired on TV Tokyo from July to September 2013, and ran for thirteen episodes, spawning a host of merchandise, a mobile game, while also receiving mixed reactions at the end of its broadcast. A second season aired from July to September 2014, and was directed by both Takashi Shimizu and Noboru Iguchi along with scripts written by Shōichirō Masumoto. The third season aired from January to April 2016. A fourth season aired from January to March 2017. A fifth season aired from July to October of the same year. A sixth season aired from July to September 2018. A seventh season aired from July to September 2019. An eighth season aired from January to April 2021. A ninth season aired from July to October of the same year, with the theme of the episodes being based on the Chinese Zodiac. A tenth season aired from January to April 2022. An eleventh season aired from July to October 2023. A twelfth season premiered in January 2024. A thirteenth season premiered on July 14, 2024, to October 7, 2024. A fourteenth season premiered on January 5, 2025, to April 7, 2025. A fifteenth season premiered on July 13, 2025, to October 6, 2025. A sixteenth season premiered on January 11, 2026.

A spin-off titled Ninja Collection aired from July 13 to October 26, 2020. A live-action adaptation later aired.

== Synopsis ==
Every week at 5 p.m., an old man wearing a yellow mask appears at a children's playground and tells ghost stories based on Japanese myths and urban legends. The man, known as the kamishibaiya (kamishibai narrator), presents the stories from the back of his bicycle using the traditional kamishibai (紙芝居, paper drama) storytelling method, with a different tale each week.

In the third season, the format changes. Instead of the old masked man and his kamishibai stage, a boy appears on a playground slide and sings, "Friends on that side, come to this side... Friends on this side, go to that side..." while drawing illustrations of the creatures from the stories. The boy is later revealed to be the kamishibaiya in the form of a child. At the end of each episode, the narrator's mask sings the closing song to him, multiplying in number, with the final mask eventually appearing on the boy's face.

From the fourth season onward, the kamishibaiya returns to telling stories to children at a playground every 5 p.m., returning to the format used in the first two seasons, although the voice actors change in each episode. In the fifth season, he tells his stories to a crowd of women who gather after hearing the call of the old man, who appears in silhouette. In the sixth season, the stories are told in a forest, where a shadow takes the form of the old man and puts on the mask before introducing the story. In the seventh season, the old man tells his stories in a dark apartment. In the eighth season, he appears at a busy urban intersection surrounded by shadowy passersby. In the ninth season, he tells the stories to animals representing the Chinese zodiac.

The tenth season begins with the narrator slowly making his announcement in an empty playground but stopping halfway. This season is based on Hyakumonogatari Kaidankai.

== Production ==
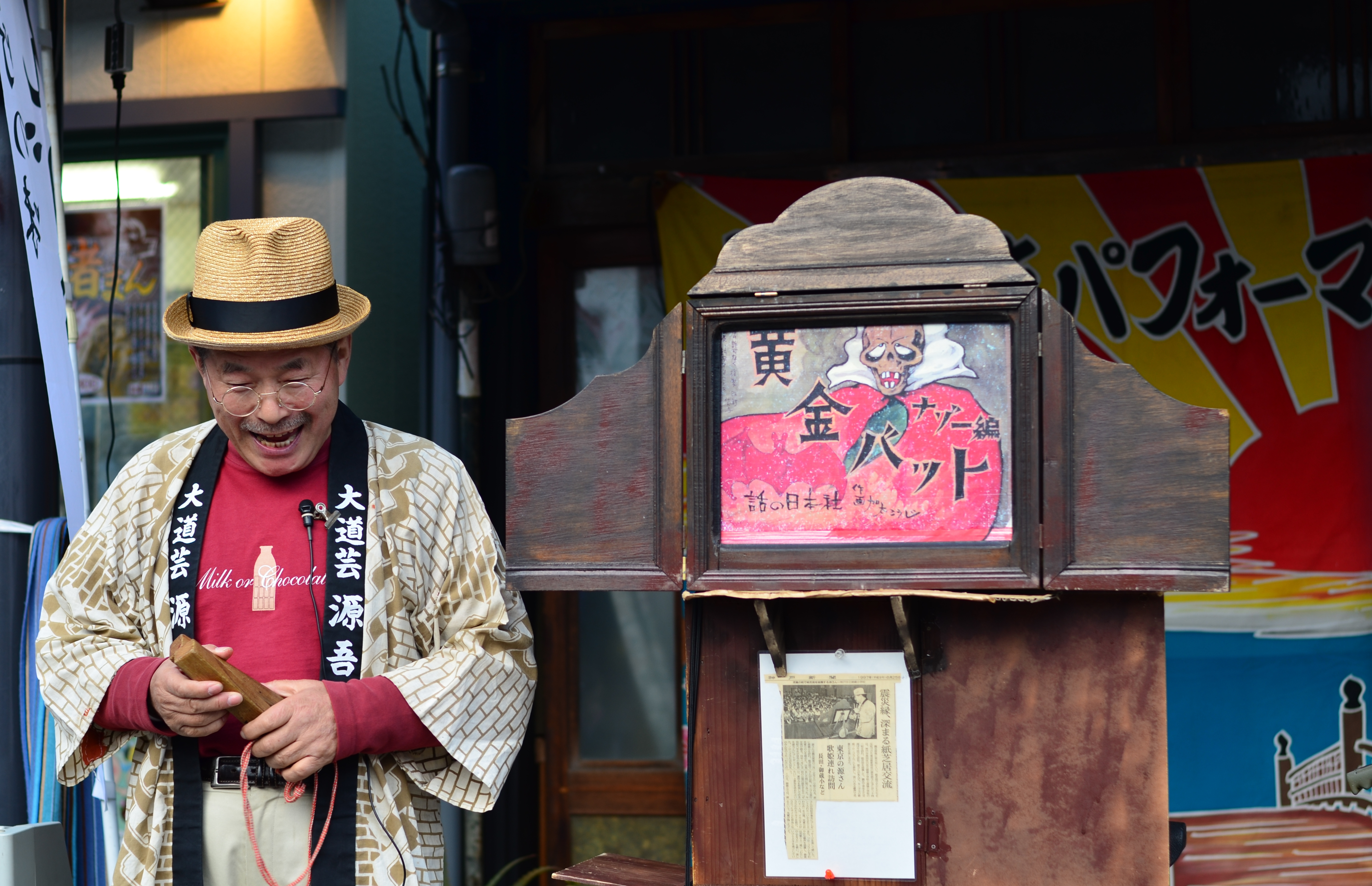
The series aimed to mimick the traditional art of kamishibai storytelling.

The first season of the series is produced by ILCA and directed by Tomoya Takashima along with script writing by Hiromu Kumamoto and narrated by Kanji Tsuda. The series is animated in such a way as to mimic a traditional Japanese method of storytelling known as kamishibai.

The second season was directed by Takashi Shimizu and Noboru Iguchi while Shōichirō Masumoto wrote the script.

== Release ==
The 13-episode first season aired from July 15 to September 30, 2013, on TV Tokyo, which was later aired on AT-X. Crunchyroll also acquired both seasons of the series for online simulcast streaming in select parts of the world with English subtitles. On April 4, 2014, All-Entertainment Co., Ltd. released the first season in its entirety on a single DVD volume in Japan. The first and second seasons have been licensed by Sentai Filmworks.

A second season aired from July 7 to September 29, 2014. A third season aired from January 11 to April 4, 2016. A fourth season aired from January 16 to March 27, 2017. A fifth season aired from July 3 to October 2 of the same year. A sixth season aired from July 7 to September 29, 2018. Sentai Filmworks will be re-releasing the series with an English dub which was slated to be released in 2019, but was delayed to June 25, 2025. A seventh season aired from July 8 to September 30, 2019. A spin-off titled Ninja Collection aired on July 12, 2020. An eighth season aired from January 11 to April 5, 2021. A ninth season aired from July 12 to October 4 of the same year, with the theme of the episodes being based on the Chinese Zodiac. A tenth season aired from January 10 to April 4, 2022. An eleventh season aired from July 10 to October 2, 2023. A twelfth season premiered on January 15, 2024. A thirteenth season premiered on July 15, 2024. A fourteenth season premiered on January 5, 2025.

In March 2026, it was announced that seasons 1 and 2 would be making their debut on the HIDIVE platform, on March 31, 2026.

== Episodes ==
=== Season 1 ===
No.	Official English title Original Japanese title (Note: All English titles are taken from Crunchyroll.)	Original release date (Note: As season 1 premiered primarily in TV Tokyo's Sunday 26:15 (02:15 JST) time slot, the episodes technically aired the days following the ones listed.)
1	"The Talisman Woman" "Ofuda Onna" (お札女)	July 14, 2013
A young man named Ito moves into an apartment and notices a talisman stuck to his ceiling. He removes it and notices a mysterious woman eerily staring at him from another apartment across the street. Upon returning from work the next day, he finds his apartment door strangely unlocked and another talisman stuck to the ceiling. Upon trying to remove it, the mysterious woman suddenly appears behind him. Afterwards, the woman is arrested for breaking and entering and as the police take her away, she tries to tell him something, but he can't hear it. When Ito returns to his apartment, he is shocked to find many more talismans stuck to the underside of his dining table, and angrily removes them. He peers up to find his room swarmed with ghosts. As they approach him, he can only tell himself repeatedly that it's not real.
2	"Zanbai" "Zanbai" (惨拝)	July 21, 2013
The title is a wordplay on "banzai" (万歳, may you live long); "zanbai" ( 惨拝) means "misery." A man named Inoue wakes up in a hospital with no memory of how he got there. He tries to ask a trio of other patients, who ignore him, whispering amongst themselves in a corner. The doctor explains what had happened, and that he would be discharged the next day. That night, the three patients surround the curtains of Inoue's hospital bed, repeatedly whispering "he cannot leave." The next day, as Inoue boards a taxi to leave, he notices the three patients on the hospital roof, seemingly performing the banzai cheer for him, but in reverse. The driver notices this in the rear-view mirror and horrifically realizes they are doing a ritual called "Zanbai." He suddenly urges Inoue to get out of the car, or he would not be able to leave the village alive. At this point, the cab is struck by an oncoming truck.
3	"The Family Rule" "Kakun" (家訓)	July 21, 2013
A young boy named Toshiharu and his parents move into his maternal grandparents' home in the country. As Toshiharu waits outside, his grandfather has a meeting with the rest of the family to explain a ritual called "Calm Through Laughter", in which the adults must stay indoors and pretend to laugh and be merry all night long to ward off the evil ghost of Toshiharu's great-great grandfather, who feeds on negativity. That night, Toshiharu wakes up to use the bathroom and curiously peers into the room where all of the adults are laughing, wearing hideous painted smiles. Terrified, Toshiharu backs away, and the door to the garden slides open. The family watches in horror as a figure lunges at them from the shadows.
4	"Hair" "Kami" (かみ)	August 4, 2013
One night, an elementary school teacher works overtime in the faculty office to finish the school newspaper. When she starts making copies, the school bells eerily ring, and the first test page comes out with strange hair-like lines. Upon opening the scanner, she is startled by a girl's face inside the machine, but finding nothing on second glance, blames fatigue. The photocopier then starts printing on its own, with each copy becoming more obstructed by hair, forcing the teacher to pull the plug. Upon checking the scanner, she finds a clump of messy black hair being sucked into the machine; when she examines the inside, she finds nothing. When she closes the scanner, a ghostly child appears from behind the copier.
5	"The Next Floor" "Ikai" (異階)	August 11, 2013
A family of three is shopping at a mall for their son's birthday gift, until Nobuaki is called into work. After some heckling from his wife, Nobuaki steps into the elevator, wishing to be left alone. The elevator attendant stops at an unlisted Floor B4, where everyone but Nobuaki gets off on the completely dark floor. The attendant then makes another stop at Floor B13 and Nobuaki witnesses a bloodied person rushing the elevator doors, which close, and the elevator suddenly departs. Frightened, Nobuaki demands that the attendant take him back to his original floor, but is horrified to find that it is only a mannequin. Arriving at his original floor, Nobuaki steps out into the deserted mall, as the lights slowly turn off. As the elevator leaves, the mannequin, suddenly upright, wishes Nobuaki enjoyment of his solitude. The elevator doors close as the mannequin stares through the gap, one of her eyes now visible.
6	"The Overhead Rack" "Amidana" (網棚)	August 18, 2013
A workaholic man named Hayashi is riding the train home after a long workday. Suffering from obvious fatigue and discomfort, he is irritated at his fellow passengers' chatter. Just then, he notices a grotesque flesh-like mass on the overhead rack, which he tries to dismiss as a hallucination. Suddenly, the train makes an emergency stop; there has been an accident involving a passenger, so the train's power will be cut for the rescue workers' safety. The strange flesh-like mass reappears and starts enveloping the man, unnoticed by the other passengers. Hayashi starts panicking, but has no strength to resist the monstrous creature, who remarks that Hayashi would feel better soon.
7	"Contradiction" "Mujun" (矛盾)	August 25, 2013
A young woman named Yūko gets a late-night phone call from her frightened friend Mayumi. Mayumi explains that she and their other friend Tōru visited an abandoned hospital to test their courage. However, Tōru ventured deep into the building and broke into a locked room, where he began to act strangely. Mayumi then fled in fright and phoned Yūko; she asks to come over, before mumbling, "I can leave?" At that moment, there is a knock at her door; from the other side of it, Tōru tells the same story as Mayumi with their roles reversed, further adding that it looked as through Mayumi's face had been replaced. Yūko opens the door, and Tōru appears with a grotesque face, repeating the phrase "I can leave?"
8	"The Umbrella Goddess" "Kasa Kamisama" (傘神様)	September 1, 2013
This story appears to be based on the urban legend Hasshaku-sama or Eight Feet Tall Woman. A boy named Kenji goes to visit his friend Takeru in the countryside. Takeru goes inside, and Kenji notices a woman abnormally holding an open umbrella with her mouth and emitting a high-pitched squeal. After relating this to Takeru's father, he becomes horrorstruck, murmuring "The Umbrella Goddess." That night, Takeru's father has Kenji sleep in the storage shed with a bowl of salt, and warns him not to open the door until morning. Some time later, Takeru brings Kenji snacks and apologizes for his father's behavior before leaving. As Kenji is about to lock the door, he drops the key. Takeru suddenly reappears and asks Kenji to open the door; the latter quickly locks it in fear. The Takeru-figure rocks the shed, emitting a high-pitched squeal; its repeated requests for Kenji to open the door intensify as the bowl of salt burns. The next morning, Kenji exits the shed with a sigh of relief, and the Umbrella Goddess ambushes him.
9	"Cursed" "Tatarare" (祟られ)	September 1, 2013
A woman informs her teen daughter Kotone that she has found someone to help them dispel a curse, which has manifested as a horrible skin condition. They visit a Shinto shrine where the priestess explains that ancestral enemies had cursed their family and performs a ritual, seemingly curing Kotone. The next morning, as Kotone leaves for school, her mother receives a phone call from the priestess' aide; he reports that the curse has killed the priestess. In her last words, she lamented failing to help Kotone, but hoped she would live a full life. As Kotone walks to school with a friend, her skin condition erupts on her neck, forming a hand imprint that strangles her.
10	"The Moon" "Tsuki" (月)	September 8, 2013
One night at a lodge, a high school baseball team named Daisuke, Akinobu, Takashi discusses their current training camp and recall how their teammate Daisuke fell into a pit toilet during a little league camp in first grade, although he fails to recall the event. As Daisuke uses the restroom later that night, he recalls the event while staring at the moon through the window; after he somehow fell into the pit toilet, a figure had stalked him while he was trapped in the pit. In the present, Daisuke notices a figure staring at him from the pit before suddenly vanishing, which he dismisses as his imagination. While washing his hands at the bathroom sink, the toilet stall suddenly creaks open and Daisuke watches through the mirror in horror as a dark creature climbs out of the pit toilet.
11	"Video" "Bideo" (ビデオ)	September 15, 2013
Three middle school friends named Takaaki, Osamu, Masaki decide to take a break from their homework and watch a supposedly supernatural videotape. When the video starts playing, the boys notice something resembling a face next to a gravestone and assume it to be ghost footage. However, one of the boys, Takaaki, also notices a strange humanoid in the background, which his friends don't see; upon rewinding the tape, the figure somehow moves to the foreground and suddenly stares directly at him. Takaaki is shocked by this, asking his friends if they truly had not seen the figure. Two humanoid faces can be seen reflected in the screen as Takaaki turns around to find that his friends have morphed into humanoid creatures. In deep, distorted voices, they question him about what he had seen.
12	"Tomonari-kun" "Tomonari-kun" (トモナリクン)	September 22, 2013
A middle school girl named Keiko returns to her apartment complex, where she sees five young boys sitting around a black shadow in the courtyard. They introduce the shadow as their friend, "Tomonari-kun." They claim that "Tomonari-kun" has invited her to play with them but she declines and promises to play with "Tomonari-kun" soon. The next day, they invite her again but she declines due to her part-time job. When she returns home, the boys knock at her door, claiming that "Tomonari-kun" is visiting her, pointing to a black shadow on her ceiling. Spooked, Keiko shoos the boys away, then watches in fear as the black shadow manifests a head who speaks of her promise before pulling Keiko into itself. The boys watch from outside as her feet dangle from the ceiling, calmly stating that "Tomonari-kun" seems happy. The final scene shows the boys now sitting around two shadows in the courtyard...
13	"Tormentor" "Uzuki" (疼憑き)	September 29, 2013
This story appears to be based on the Kunekune. A trio of elementary school boys named Shōta, Taichi, Masahiro are observing a nearby house through binoculars, hoping to catch a glimpse of the Tormentor, an entity that allegedly caused people to disappear. Masahiro, unnerved, leaves. The remaining two, Shōta and Taichi, spot the occupants emerging, wearing blindfolds, with an obscured figure contorting its limbs behind them. Just as the entity is about to enter Shōta's field of vision, Taichi snatches the binoculars impatiently and goes into shock upon seeing it. He then abruptly leaves, jerking and twitching. The next day, Shōta tries to return Taichi's binoculars, but Taichi's father allows him to keep them, explaining that Taichi is transferring schools. Shōta glimpses past him to see a group of blindfolded people trying to restrain a writhing Taichi; Taichi's mother is weeping. Upon leaving, Shōta looks back and sees Taichi at the window; he tries looking through the binoculars, but Taichi is gone. Then, he sees Taichi's father, seemingly trying to warn him of something. Suddenly, Taichi quickly shambles towards him through the binocular's field of vision, as a Tormentor, with darkened eyes.

=== Season 2 ===
No.	Official English title Original Japanese title	Original release date (Note: As season 2 premiered primarily in TV Tokyo's Sunday 26:35 (02:35 JST) time slot, the episodes technically aired the days following the ones listed.)
1	"Taro-chan" (タロちゃん)	July 6, 2014
A policeman named Hatanaka is to give a traffic safety presentation in a ventriloquism act with a doll named "Taro-chan" at a public assembly. The act begins smoothly enough until the doll's head jams and a wooden talisman falls out. "Taro-chan" convulses; seeming to gain its own consciousness, it begins graphically detailing a bicycle accident, much to Hatanaka's horror; he desperately struggles to remove his hand from the doll, while the crowd believes it to be a part of the act. Hatanaka manages to remove "Taro-chan" and throw it offstage, where it manages to say that the accident "hurt."
2	"Kitchen" "Daidokoro" (台所)	July 13, 2014
A college girl named Mitsuko arrives to have dinner at Ayano's apartment. As dusk falls, she feels like she's being watched; she hears a sigh from the air conditioner and an eye suddenly appears in the grille. The power goes out, which her friend casually dismisses. Mitsuko sees a black mass with two eyes climb out of the kitchen sink. She is too frightened to eat, which offends Ayano, whom the mass begins to envelope. Ayano ignores her pleas to escape, so the black mass devours her. Mitsuko flees to a nearby hill, and sees the black mass expand out of the building, overshadowing her. The screen cuts to black, and she screams. The story ends with a pair of eyes popping out of the blackness.
3	"Inside" "Nakami" (中身)	July 20, 2014
A boy named Masamichi brings home a Matryoshka he'd found. His mother confiscates it to take to the dumpster, but is gone until after his father comes home that evening. When she returns, she has the doll and speaks strangely. Later, Masamichi hears her crying downstairs, but finds her sitting still next to the doll with her back turned to him. As he goes back upstairs, she is laughing, which his father dismisses. One night, as his mother bathes, Masamichi quietly retrieves the doll, and begins removing layers; each layer is painted with a different emotion, until he uncovers an unfinished layer with a ghastly smile messily drawn in red. Masamichi opens the final layer, and the screen cuts to black, accompanied by a loud mix of laughing, crying, shouting, and screaming. Masamichi's father charges into the room to find the mother and son standing next to the doll, which is back to normal, with both their backs turned to him.
4	"Wall Woman" "Kabe On'na" (壁女)	July 27, 2014
A college boy named Kazuhito takes a break from his studies to stare dreamily out the window at a beautiful young woman across the street on her balcony. When she goes back inside, he sees a shadow scale the wall of the woman's building in a strange cat-like pose and jump through her balcony door. The woman reappears and painfully contorts into the shadow's cat-like pose, and suddenly turns toward him with a distorted face. He hides, then carefully peers out at the balcony to find her gone. He hears strange scraping noises through his wall and follows them around the apartment to the bathroom. He finds it empty, but his bedroom window is wide open. He slowly glances around the room, when suddenly, a pale creature with long, gangly, contorted limbs drops from the ceiling and crawls toward him.
5	"Locker" "Rokkā" (ロッカー)	August 3, 2014
A high school girl named Katagiri has a crush on a handsome baseball player named Harada, but can't tell him how she feels. On the way home from school, she overhears an urban legend about a coin locker in the train station basement; if you place a photo of your crush into the locker with a doll in it, your wish to be with them will come true. She decides to try it out; picking a locker, she finds a pale, disheveled old doll, holding a small black box. Assuming this is the doll, she places the photo inside and makes her wish. The next day, she returns to find the photo is gone. Suddenly, her crush appears, wanting to try out the locker legend, but is horrified when she mentions the doll. Before he can explain, a shadow reaches out of the locker and envelopes him, crushing his body. She can only watch in horror as the shadow pulls the boy into the locker and slams it shut.
6	"Nao-chan" (ナオちゃん)	August 10, 2014
A family living in a small flat plays with shadow puppets on the ceiling as they prepare for bed. When the lights go out, the boy, Takkun, watches shadows on the ceiling; before falling asleep, he mumbles "Nao-chan..." Later, his mother asks his father if he knows anyone named "Nao", since Takkun has been calling this name at night, but to no avail. Takkun tries to point "Nao-chan" out, but his parents see nothing unusual, so they think it's just his imagination. After lights-out, Takkun calls out to Nao-chan, but this time, a ghostly sad-looking face appears on the ceiling, and approaches Takkun's mother... The next morning, she remembers Nao was her husband's college friend, who died alone recently; he had also set them up together. Months later, a baby boy is born who resembles the ghostly figure; a baby they name Nao-chan.
7	"Capsule Toy Machine" "Gatcha" (ガチャ)	August 17, 2014
A businessman named Shinji Shimazaki walks home one night after a bad day at work, passing by an old man in a graying suit huddled over a capsule toy machine, with many empty capsules strewn about. The next afternoon, after another hard day, Shinji passes by the capsule machine again and decides to try it. Inside the capsules, he finds a favorite eraser from his childhood, a dog figurine of his childhood pet, a girl figurine of his old crush. Meanwhile, he rapidly ages, with each turn of the machine's crank; hair and teeth fall out, and his skin wrinkles. He is so engrossed in the capsule machine that he doesn't notice another businessman passing by behind him. He collapses as he buys his last capsule. The next day, the passing businessman stops by the machine and slots in a coin...
8	"Farewell Confession" "Kokubetsu" (告別)	August 24, 2014
A man named Ken attends a funeral in his hometown, where the mourners' are unexpectedly jovial. Everyone is ushered inside, where the atmosphere is heavy and there is no priest. An older man walks through the shoji door into the room with the deceased, bows, whispers that he impregnated the decedent's wife, then returns to the lobby. A young woman follows suit; she broke a branch on his plum tree. An aunt explains that this funeral is a "Farewell Confession", where mourners confess to the deceased something they could not tell them in life so it can be absolved. Not having seen his dead relative in some years, Ken hesitates, then confesses to accidentally killing the decedent's dog. A sudden gust blows away the corpse's face shroud and extinguishes the candles. The corpse sits up and angrily asks, "IS THAT TRUE?!"
9	"Ominie-san" (おみにえさん)	August 31, 2014
A schoolteacher named Asako moves to the countryside for work. One day, at lunch, the students excitedly clamor around a dish called "Ominie-san", a strange purple mass that gives off black fumes. The students wolf it down hungrily with a strange crunching sound, but Asako sneaks hers to the basement furnace, when it starts squirming! She tosses it in and flees. After work, she stops at a diner, where she overhears two men order "Ominie-san" to keep up their strength. Nauseated, she quickly pays and leaves. The next day, she calls out sick. Her mom wakes her for dinner, and chides her to keep up her strength. Because Asako couldn't eat "it" at school, "it" was mixed with vegetables for taste; "it" is "Ominie-san." Initially shocked by the deceit, Asako salivates at the sight of the pot, and charges the stove. The episode ends with crunching sounds.
10	"Bugged" "Mushitsuba" (虫唾)	September 7, 2014
One midsummer night, a man complains about his boss in his diary, when he hears a buzzing noise, but finds no bugs. A few days later, his complaints intensify in his diary. The buzzing returns. He lights a mosquito coil and resumes writing. A few days after, a pair of moths flitter in; he kills them with spray and sets them on fire in his ashtray. About a week later, he writes about everything annoying him, including the incessant buzzing and skin itching. He looks in the mirror and he is extremely disheveled... and has maggots crawling out from under his eyelids. He hallucinates and his "writing" becomes less coherent and more violent. Eventually, his room is a shambles, and he is dead at his desk; looking like an empty husk. An insect pokes its head out of his open mouth. His last diary entry – "Help me..."
11	"Picking Up" "Hiroi-gyō" (拾い業)	September 14, 2014
A young man named Keita Haga is riding the train home when he finds a novel manuscript titled "After the Festival" on an overhead rack. He becomes so engrossed in it that he gets off at an unfamiliar stop. He is about to throw away the manuscript, when he finds a flyer for an amateur literature contest with a ¥3,000,000 prize (about $28,000). The next day, he gets a call informing him that his manuscript won, and asking to confirm his authorship; he lies and affirms. He arrives at the awards ceremony, where the host asks one last time to confirm that he had written it. As the ceremony begins, Keita notices the audience and host have become deformed skeletons. The backdrop curtain opens, revealing a vortex. Horrified, Keita confesses that he lied about writing the novel. The host reminds him that he'd already confirmed his authorship. He is then dragged into the vortex, shouting "I'm sorry!" as the curtain falls.
12	"Netsuke" (根付)	September 21, 2014
A college girl named Kaoru is helping to clean her grandmother's shop when she finds a box in a cabinet. Inside is a matching pair of netsuke depicting faces, which belonged to her grandfather; she turns them into earrings. That afternoon, she hears a whisper "Give it back." That evening, two shadowy figures in traditional clothing begin pursuing her; throughout, Kaoru repeatedly hears whispers of "Give it back!" She flees toward a bus, when she notices that the whispers came from the netsuke, saying "Give back my face!" She narrowly evades a swipe at her shoulder, which knocks down one of the netsuke, shattering it on the ground. The figures stop to pick up the fragments, allowing her to escape. At the shop, Kaoru tries to return the remaining netsuke to her grandmother, when a visitor arrives, wearing traditional clothes... with a shattered face.
13	"Bringer Drums" "Yadorikiko" (寄鼓)	September 28, 2014
A newlywed couple named Daigo and Shiho moves to the country, when the wife finds a small red Japanese den-den daiko pellet drum with its handle planted into the ground; two lines of planted drums lead up to their new house. The town elder greets them, and explains that the drums are lined up to newcomers' homes as a tradition, to bring good luck. The couple is led to a temple enshrining the town's god (a mixture between a Kokeshi and Jizo), who follows the drums to visit newcomers. That night, Shiho wakes up upon hearing drums; the pellet drums are playing on their own, and babies are crying. She tries to wake her husband to no avail. The sounds get closer and louder, then stop. Daigo stirs; he wails in a distorted infant cry that echoes through the valley. Lights turn on all over town, but turn off as the crying continues and becomes more childlike.

=== Season 3 ===
No.	Official English title Original Japanese title	Original release date (Note: As season 3 premiered primarily in TV Tokyo's Sunday 26:35 (02:35 JST) time slot, the episodes technically aired the days following the ones listed.)
1	"Lend It to Me" "Kashite" (貸して)	January 10, 2016
A young man named Sekiguchi notices an unfamiliar bathhouse on his way home from work, and decides to stop in. He quickly notices he's the only customer. From the other side of the dividing wall, a woman asks to borrow soap, which he tosses over the wall. Later, the woman asks for a bucket; he wonders why, as they are the only customers, but tosses one over. As he showers, the woman requests a razor, then scissors, which he doesn't have. The woman starts to mumble about cutting something, much to his dread. He hurries through his shower, trying to ignore her increasingly manic demands. He is about to flee when a monster with stringy black hair and a soap bar in its mouth, carrying giant scissors, climbs over the wall. His dangling feet disappear over the wall...
2	"Tunnel" "Tonneru" (トンネル)	January 17, 2016
Two men named Higashihara and Shibata are driving in the mountains, but are lost and low on gas. They take a tunnel but the car runs out of gas, forcing them to push it. They stop to rest, but Higashihara notices slime on the road and tunnel ceiling. As they wait for another car to pass by, they notice two kids looking in through the window, who are revealed to be heads on the feet of a giant spider. The spider gets two of its legs into the window gap before the men can close it, and attacks... Later, another driver is going through the tunnel and stops, thinking he'd hit something, but only finds a slime trail. Back inside, he finds the two men, now heads on the feet of a giant insect. The tunnel is a nest of giant insects with human heads for body parts...
3	"Rat" "Nezumi" (ねずみ)	January 24, 2016
A young couple, Kenta and Machiko, finish moving into their cheap old apartment, and find a rat. That night, a rat bites Machiko on the finger. Kenta leaves for a business trip after setting a rat cage trap to calm Machiko. That night, as she sleeps, rats surround her bed... Two days later, Kenta returns home and calls out to Machiko. A clawed hand opens the bedroom door and rats scurry out. Kenta watches in horror as a giant rat with a vaguely human face and pigtails emerges, and says with a giggle that the rats grew on her.
4	"The Noisy Hospital Room" "Nigiyakana Byoushitsu" (にぎやかな病室)	January 31, 2016
At 2:15 AM, a patient walks down a hospital hallway. He hears laughter coming from a room. He opens the door to find himself on an operating table, surrounded by surgeons with huge laughing mouths for faces. He wakes in a cold sweat in his hospital room. He tries to call a nurse, but the call button fails, and the front desk is vacant. On his way back, he sees a nurse walking down a dark hallway with a flashlight; he follows, but loses her when he bumps into an elderly patient. He realizes he's in the hallway from his dream, and it's 2:15 AM. Down the hall, he sees the lit room with laughter emanating from it, and recalls that a nurse warned him to stay away from it. Suspicious, he opens the door; the room is empty and dark. Back in his room, he hears laughter outside his door, and hides under the covers until all is quiet. When he peeks out, he is surrounded by surgeons with huge laughing mouths for faces. He tells himself it's just a dream before joining in the laughter. Outside the operating room, the old patient hears the noise, and the nurse reappears telling the patient to stay away from the room.
5	"Museum of Taxidermy" "Hakusei Hakubutsukan" (剥製博物館)	February 7, 2016
One evening, a young couple is caught in the rain. Along their way, the man suggests taking shelter in a nearby "Museum of Taxidermy". As the couple explores the museum, the woman is perturbed at how engrossed the other guests are with the exhibits, and the way stuffed animals look almost alive. But the man dismisses it and even scares her as a prank, causing her to leave in a huff. The man returns to the hotel, but finds his key missing. He rushes back to the museum; to his surprise, it's still open, and there are still people inside. The desk clerk greets him, but his voice slows down like a toy with dying batteries. Frightened, he rushes inside and finds that the staff and guests are all stuffed corpses. He screams as multiple pairs of eyes peer from the darkness... The sounds of animals fill the museum as the shadows of animals surround a new exhibit: the young couple, sewn together and stuffed.
6	""That Side" Festival" "Achira no Matsuri" (アチラの祭)	February 14, 2016
One night, two girls, Miki and Asako, are enjoying a festival. Asako then comes across a mask stand, and calls out to Miki to have a look, but Miki has disappeared. One of the masks, a white geisha mask suddenly says "That side", in a deep voice. The people are all gone, and the lights dim; the stand attendants have become monsters; and a deep voice booms in the distance, "Go to that side". Fog rolls in, followed by a parade of laughing ghosts and a float with a shaped like a white geisha mask with huge mouth; it is the one saying the phrase. Asako flees and frantically searches for Miki, who suddenly takes her hand and runs, but Asako asks where are they going. Miki's face turns into the white mask and says in a deep voice, "That side." Asako screams as the sounds of laughter and the distant "Go to that side" echo throughout the dimly lit festival...
7	"Behind" "Ushiro" (うしろ)	February 21, 2016
On a school field trip, all of the students are asleep, except for three boys. One of them, Osamu, doesn't want to sleep because of a recurring nightmare – he's in class and everyone is laughing. A female figure enters the room, laughing as it walks behind desks. Suddenly, a huge hand with red painted nails grabs and twists his head into a knot as it forces him to look up... and the dream ends. The boys dismiss it, but one of them is unnerved when he wakes to use the bathroom. He hears a loud crack, and sees Osamu's whole head twisted. He watches in horror as all the other boys suffer this same fate. Suddenly, a huge hand with red painted nails grabs his head. He can't close his eyes or look away, as he is forced to look up at the laughing figure – a woman with a twisted head, bugged out eyes, and a muscular arm – before his own head is twisted with a crack.
8	"The Empress Doll" "O-Hinasama" (お雛様)	February 28, 2016
Two teen couples break into an abandoned house to test their courage. In one of the rooms, the teens find a butsudan and a set of displayed Hinamatsuri dolls. One of the girls, Yumi, points out that the empress doll is missing. In an upper floor bedroom, they find a three-sided mirror, and dare the other girl, Nobuko, to look into it. Her boyfriend, Haruo, opens it so they can all look. The door behind them in the reflection opens slowly, but the real door is still closed. In the mirror, a giant Hinamatsuri empress doll stands in the threshold; it enters the room, grabs Yumi's reflection, and exits while the real Yumi collapses to her knees in fear. As they flee, the couples look in the doll room, and find Yumi's body laying haphazardly on the collapsed doll display, her face painted like a Hinamatsuri doll. They turn around and find the empress doll behind them; it cackles as its eyes widen, and its mouth opens to reveal a set of fangs.
9	"The Fourth Man" "Yonninme" (4人目)	March 6, 2016
After class, two high school girls discuss the urban legend of the Handshake Men with their teacher – four men stand by the roadside at night, asking passersby for a handshake; those who refuse are crushed to death, but the fourth man bites off your hand. Another student, Haruko, overhears them but dismisses it. Later, she escorts her younger sister, Naomi, to school to retrieve her notebook, but on their way home, a man appears and asks for a handshake. Remembering the story, Haruko shakes his hand quickly and takes off running with Naomi. They run to a police box, where the officer asks for a handshake, followed by a third man, both of whom she obliges. Suddenly, Haruko realizes Naomi is gone, and worries that she may have run into the fourth man. Suddenly a hand grabs hers... but it's not Naomi. A man prepares to bite her hand off with his giant mouth...
10	"Merry-go-Round" "Merīgōrando" (メリーゴーランド)	March 13, 2016
A young couple, Shinichi and Satomi, arrive at a mall rooftop carnival (resembling the one seen in the Season 2 opening) at dusk. A clown appears and offers them a free balloon, which Satomi accepts. Just then, the PA announces that the mall will be closing shortly. The clown offers to let them ride the carousel before leaving; Satomi accepts, but Shinichi declines and offers to take pictures instead. As Shinichi looks at his pictures, Satomi asks if he's watching, and he absently says yes. When she asks again if he's watching, he notices that Satomi's entire body is flaccid, and the two kids on the ride are smiling wickedly. When Satomi calls out again, her face is now deformed. The guests and performers surround him with evil smiles. Suddenly, Satomi is gone, and Shinichi searches for her. The carousel starts up again. A hand grabs him, belonging to a deformed, twitching carousel horse with rolling eyes and a balloon tied to its hoof. The story ends with the mall closing, the carnival's music winding down, and the sound of laughter...
11	"Cuckoo Clock" "Hatodokei" (鳩時計)	March 20, 2016
Rumi and her mother visit her grandmother's house, where she notices the bird popping out of a cuckoo clock. Her grandmother explains that the bird only comes out on the hour. That night, Rumi runs into the living room to see it every time she hears the bird pop out. Five minutes to midnight, Rumi awakens to use the bathroom, but hears the clock ticking, and stands in front of it, making tick-tock sounds. At the stroke of midnight, the bird doesn't pop out. Rumi checks the clock, but it falls from the wall and breaks. Suddenly, the doors open and a fleshy, deformed bird with spinning eyes pops out and makes a distorted cuckoo sound, which amuses Rumi... The next morning, Rumi's mother awakens to find she isn't in bed. Walking downstairs, she hears Rumi making tick-tock sounds in the living room. When she calls to her, Rumi slowly turns toward her, her eyes now spinning, her mouth now a cuckoo clock door. When the door opens, the scene cuts to the exterior of the house and Rumi's mother's screams over the sounds of choked cuckoos.
12	"In the Water" "Mizu no naka" (水の中)	March 27, 2016
Late one night, a boy named Tōru, sneaks into a closed swimming pool to prepare for the prefectural tournament next week. The pool looks creepy, but undeterred, he dives into the water for practice, awakening something in the process. He swims, unaware that he is being followed by black hairlike tendrils. Finally, he reaches the end of the pool, and notices black hair on his hands, and a mass of hair in the pool. Terrified, Tōru tries to swim away, but is entangled in the hair, and hears cackling in the water. He exits the pool and tries to run, but the hair wraps around his throat. Tōru sees the owner of the hair: a giant fish with a woman's head and glowing yellow eyes. The fish woman laughs as it pulls him under the water.
13	"– Drawings —" "– E -" (- 絵 -)	April 4, 2016
This episode skips the regular opening. The boy from the opening draws on the playground while three other children play nearby. A teacher named Yuriko who has just moved to town tries to talk to the boy, who abruptly walks away. She notices the boy sitting in the back of her class, drawing. She invites him to draw her, but he declines. She learns that three children were reported missing, the three from the playground. Yuriko walks home that night and spots the boy sketching a monster assimilating a man in a phone booth. She follows him over the next few days, and observes different monsters tormenting people, and the boy drawing them, laughing. The next day, she looks at his sketchbook, and finds a drawing of the missing children being grabbed by a monster. Suddenly, the boy appears, saying that he will draw her now. All of the monsters from the other episodes of Season 3 surround her, and the boy's face morphs into the kamishibaiya's mask.

=== Season 4 ===
No.	Official English title Original Japanese title	Original release date (Note: As season 4 premiered primarily in TV Tokyo's Sunday 26:35 (02:35 JST) time slot, the episodes technically aired the days following the ones listed.)
1	"Tongue" "Shita" (舌)	January 16, 2017
A salaryman walking home from work runs into two children who are saddened by the sight of a dead cat lying in the middle of the street. He scoops the cat up and buries it next to a tree; two passersby mutter that something could follow you home if you take pity on it. The boys and the man say a prayer for the cat, and go on their ways. That night, while the man watches TV, he hears what sounds like a cat meowing, but shrugs it off and decides to go to bed early. The meows get closer and closer until it's right next to his bed. A cat licks him, but he feels something is off... When his eyes adjust to the dark, he realizes the meows sound human. A pale-skinned, dark-haired woman with glowing green eyes is holding the dead cat. "I'm so glad I got to see you," she says, "So, why did you find the cat, but not me?"
2	"Fish Tank" "Suisō" (水槽)	January 16, 2017
Three middle school boys are walking home from school, talking about an old abandoned mansion, rumored to be haunted. One of the boys, Shigeru, climbs in through a second-storey window, but only finds a massive fish tank left dirty and neglected with plants and murky water still inside. He hears something bubbling from the tank, but can't see anything in the filthy water. But when he presses his face up against the glass, something bumps against the tank. He looks down from the top of the tank and peers into the water closely. Suddenly, a pair of slimy, purple hands pulls him into the tank. One of Shigeru's friends comes in looking for him, only to find the fish tank. Then he hears something bang against the tank from the inside...
3	"Sewing Shears" "Tachibasami" (裁ち鋏)	January 16, 2017
A college girl moves to a new apartment. She lifts up a loose floor board to find a rusty pair of scissors stabbed into the ground through a paper talisman, with a lock of dark hair attached to it; she promptly tosses them all into the waste bin. That night, she awakens to a strange moaning sound coming from under the errant floor board. Slowly, she removes the board and gasps in horror at the sight of the top half of a head with long black hair staring back at her. She quickly awakens from the dream. As she heads for the bathroom, a quick glance into the waste bin reveals that the scissors, talisman, and lock of hair are gone. Then she hears the moaning from her dream coming from under the floor board, but finds nothing there. The phone rings, and she answers it, relieved that it's her friend. She doesn't notice the figure of a man missing the top half of his head standing behind her...
4	"Red High Heel" "Akai haihīru" (赤いハイヒール)	January 16, 2017
A salaryman narrowly misses the last train. The taxi line at the station is too long, so he decides to hail one on street, finally catching one after many occupied taxis pass him. Inside, he finds a red high-heeled slipper next to his foot and asks the driver if a passenger forgot it but the driver mutters to him to throw it out, the passenger is confused and is startled when the driver, impatiently screams at him to throw the shoe out. Then both men hear the sound of someone running getting closer. The salaryman looks out the window and sees a blonde-haired woman in a red dress running next to the taxi at an impossible speed. The driver, terrified, begs him to throw the shoe out. When his eyes adjust to the dark, the salaryman realizes the shoe is not red, but white and covered in blood. With a scream, he throws the shoe out the window and the woman stops running. At first he's relieved, but then the driver runs over a blonde-haired woman in a red dress, killing her instantly.
5	"Night Bus" "Yakō basu" (夜行バス)	January 29, 2017
Four friends are on the night bus when one of them suddenly gets a stomachache and asks the driver to stop at the next service area. After using the restroom, he walks to the parking lot, but finds many buses and can't figure out which one is his. He boards what looks like his bus; noticing the passengers' sullenness, he takes his seat, slightly disturbed. He gets a text message from one of his friends from a row behind him, Yūichi, asking what was wrong. Then he gets a phone call from his other friend, Saeko, who was sitting across the aisle from him, but the girl sitting there is not holding a phone. He answers, and she asks where he is. The girl sitting across the aisle turns to look at him. The man becomes afraid as he hears his friends' voices on the phone, yet no one on the bus is talking. His fear grows when he realizes everyone on the bus is now staring at him...
6	"Guess Who?" "Dare da" (誰だ)	February 5, 2017
A teen boy and girl await the train, en route home from a date at the amusement park. The boy goes to get a drink, leaving the girl feeling awkward. She notices a pale, dark-haired girl dressed in black sitting on a bench on the opposite platform; she feels she's looking right at her. Suddenly, the girl in black stands up and approaches the track, then disappears as a train passes by. A pair of hands covers the girl's eyes and the boy's voice asks, "Guess who?" She says she knows it's him, but then a question pops into her mind – Who is he? She tries to remember what she knows about him, but he's been erased from her memory. Another train passes, and she sees between the fingers, reflected in the train's windows, that the pale girl is covering her eyes. She is then revealed to be covering her own eyes, having become the girl in black. She asks herself, in a voice that's not her own, "Who am I?" and vanishes among the passersby.
7	"Footsteps" "Kutsuoto" (靴音)	February 12, 2017
A man is dragged to a department store sale by his wife Mayumi on one of his rare days off. He receives a text from his coworker Nagase, inviting him out for a drink. He excuses himself to use the bathroom. In the darkened room, he sits in one of the stalls and replies to Nagase. Then he finds ink on his shirt; in the dim light of his cell phone, he sees writing all over the stall walls, all in fresh ink. Just then, he hears someone enter the bathroom and begin pacing. His fear grows as he hears more people entering and pacing around the bathroom, and the sound grows louder until the room shakes. Just then, Mayumi calls him, and the footsteps stop instantly. The writing on the walls stretches, and the man sees four pairs of feet under the stall's door. He shakes in fear as he raises his gaze to the top of the stall door, revealing four ghostly people staring back at him...
8	"Cassette Tape" "Kasettotēpu" (カセットテープ)	February 19, 2017
A man visits his hometown to attend the wedding of an old friend, Tanabe. He returns to his old room, and finds a cassette tape in his desk labeled, "What Happened Today". He plays it; hearing his young voice, he remembers that he kept an audio diary on tapes as a child. After a few entries, the voice on the tape changes, presumably his middle school self, who describes an old man being rude to him at a jagged park; but he doesn't recall this event. The entries become more surreal and nonsensical, until he hears his present-day voice. He becomes horrified hearing his own voice talk about Tanabe's wedding, about beating him with a stick, just like he did to the old man in the park. Not wanting to hear any more, he takes off the headphones and realizes they were never plugged into the cassette player. The kamishibaiya describes the wedding the next day as "exciting as could be."
9	"Grinding Teeth" "Kensaku ha" (研削歯)	February 26, 2017
An office worker named Miwako is traveling with a co-worker. They find a cave with four Jizo statues with red cloths tied around their necks; one has a red string tied around its tooth. That night, Miwako gets a toothache from grinding her teeth, so she goes to a local dentist. The elderly dentist takes a look, and her expression darkens; she quietly instructs her assistants to not let Miwako get away, before retrieving a pair of pliers. Miwako is held down by the assistants, but manages to get away; the dentist shouts a warning as she escapes. Back at the hotel, she checks her tooth in the mirror, and it pops out on its own. The dentist's warning is then revealed to the audience: "If you leave like this, they'll come for you!" Miwako finds the tooth gone, a trail of blood leading to the bedroom. She hears a grinding sound, which gets louder as she gets closer to her friend...
10	"Calling Crane" "Yobitsuru" (招び鶴)	March 5, 2017
Three middle school friends, Honoka, Yukari, and Miku, get together to play Calling Crane, which reportedly allows one to talk to the dead – a red string is tied to a razor blade, then left in water overnight, along with an origami crane folded from a sheet of paper with a dead person's name written on it 49 times, the person swallows the paper crane; and the summoned ghost would then talk through them. Yukari suggests they call Nayakama-sensei, a young teacher at their school who told them about the game and had vanished three months prior; a broken glass with a tied razor blade was left behind on his desk. Honoka is chosen as the swallower, but the crane gets stuck in her throat. Her coughs become more violent until she heaves it out; Nayakama-sensei's name is replaced with hers on the paper. Suddenly, Honoka stands up and says in a man's voice, "So, what shall we talk about?"
11	"White Line" "Hakusen" (白線)	March 12, 2017
After school, a teacher notices a boy wearing a worn-out, unfamiliar school uniform in the schoolyard; he is drawing something with a chalk line marker. She goes outside to send him away, but he's already gone. Strangely, the chalk line leads into the building. She follows the line up to the door to the roof. She opens the door, but the boy is gone and the line leads over the edge. She looks over the edge and sees a large mark of white chalk on the pavement below. She turns around; the white line is now turning black, followed by footsteps. The door opens and five black chalk outlines emerge; she realizes that the white line was meant to lure her to the roof. The last thing she sees as the black finally reaches her is the boy looking out through the door; the last sound she hears is five thuds, with a sixth soon after.
12	"Snow Hut" "Kamakura" (かまくら)	March 19, 2017
A young boy, Masayuki, and his parents visit his grandparents every winter break, where he plays in the snow with his older cousin. As the sun sets, they build a snow hut, and his cousin goes to fetch a brazier to grill mochi. While waiting, Masayuki looks out of the snow hut and sees another with no entrance; it seems to be glowing from the inside. He knocks on the side, and gets a knock back. He pokes a hole in the wall and peers inside, seeing a single candle and scratch marks all over the walls. Masayuki is startled by an eye looking back at him through the hole; a boy's voice says, "It's your turn next." Masayuki's cousin later finds him unconscious by a collapsed snow hut. Masayuki comes to, and finds himself in bed at his grandparents' house. He overhears his family in the next room, talking about him breaking the snow hut. The family opens the door, acting overly happy. The front door is open, leading to an open snow hut. The family beckons Masayuki to come to them, but he has a bad feeling. A silhouette of a child looking at him through a hole in the shoji screen tells him "go on, it's your turn now."
13	"Underground Walkway" "Chika tsūro" (地下通路)	March 26, 2017
One rainy night, a college student heads home after a drinking party, and decides to take an unfamiliar underground walkway to the subway. The dark curving path seems to go on and on, and just when he decides to turn around, he runs into a worker. The worker doesn't acknowledge him, only repeating "It's only dark at first." The worker is pointing down an even narrower and darker path. Feeling unnerved, he slips past the worker and continues straight until he reaches a locked gate, leaving him no choice but to turn back. He walks down the tunnel, and it seems to go on and on; he can't even find the path the worker pointed to. He looks down, and sees what look like footprints and when he looks to where the side path should have been before; there was a filled-in wall with the shadow imprint of a human on it. The shape seemed to be moving and struggling in agony. Suddenly, it moves off the wall, repeating, "It's only dark at first." The man calls out in vain for help; it is revealed that the original entrance is now sealed off.

=== Season 5 ===
No.	Official English title Original Japanese title	Original release date (Note: As season 5 premiered primarily in TV Tokyo's Sunday 26:35 (02:35 JST) time slot, the episodes technically aired the days following the ones listed.)
1	"Wrong Number" "Machigatta bangō" (間違った番号)	July 2, 2017
Mrs. Masuda is at home with her stepson Hirofumi. The phone rings; an unfamiliar woman says she will be late, before abruptly hanging up. Later, the woman calls back, asking her to watch her child for another hour. Mrs. Masuda tells her she has the wrong number, but the call ends abruptly. Mr. Masuda calls to tell her he'll be late, and asks her to eat dinner with Hirofumi. At dinner, she scolds Hirofumi, making him cry. The phone rings; the same woman tells her she's en route. Frustrated, Mrs. Masuda tells her she has the wrong number, but the woman knows Hirofumi by name. Mrs. Masuda suddenly recalls Hirofumi drawing a picture of a woman, labeling it "Mama"... The doorbell rings and a woman's voice says she's there to pick up Hirofumi. A pale woman with black hair and dark eyes enters the room. Mrs. Masuda grabs a knife, just as Hirofumi calls out, "Mama?"
2	"Give It To Me" "Chōdai" (ちょうだい)	July 9, 2017
A young office worker passes a playground on her way home, where a young girl calls out to her. When asked, the girl says her mother is en route, she then admires the woman's butterfly brooch and asks her for it; the woman gives it to her as a reward for waiting patiently for her mother. The next evening, the girl is at the playground again; this time she asks for some lipstick. The woman humors her and moves on. The next night, the woman is on a date, and the girl appears by their car, wearing the same clothes and lipstick, and asking her to hand over her boyfriend; the woman and her date drive away. Suddenly, the girl appears in the backseat, and her arms stretch out and grab the woman's date. Then she turns her head to the terrified woman, she reaches a hand out to her, asking for more...
3	"The Crow Children" "Karasu no ko" (カラスの子)	July 16, 2017
A girl named Sae and her mother visit her grandmother in the countryside. On the way, they pass a group of boys fleeing from the Crow Lady, a veiled old woman in black, who walks by silently into a house covered in branches. Upon reaching her grandmother's house, Sae plays in the yard while her mother and grandmother chat, but suddenly disappears. Sae's mother eventually finds her at the house covered in branches; a murder of crows is perched on the roof. In the yard, Sae is greeted by the old woman in black, who heard her crying because she fell from a tree. Sae's mother apologizes for her trespassing, then hurries her away. Sae explains she was in the old woman's yard "because they looked like they were having fun"; in her eyes, they are not crows, but children atop the house, in the tree, and on the fence. As they depart, the old woman warns her to not let children wander...
4	"Copycat" "Manekko" (まねっこ)	July 23, 2017
A young woman named Haru has just finished her college entrance ceremony and runs into her childhood friend Yukari, who has just made it off the waitlist at the same school, and is ecstatic to be together again. Haru remembers how Yukari copied everything she did since childhood. One day, Yukari asks if she could wear the same watch as Haru, be in the same classes, and join the same clubs. Frustrated, Haru scolds Yukari for copying her, making her cry. She then gently explains that it doesn't bode well for her future to just copy. Yukari then insists that since they both want to be teachers, it justifies the copying; Haru concedes. Pleased, Yukari takes leave, crossing the street on a red light, and is hit by a car. Haru smiles sadly as she vanishes, revealing that Yukari made it off the waitlist because she had died. In the end, Yukari copied Haru, even unto death.
5	"Shadows of Women" "Onna no kage" (女のカゲ)	July 30, 2017
A woman waits for her husband to come home from drinks with coworkers. When he finally does, she collects his clothes for the wash as he prepares to shower, and finds signs of cheating. She senses the shadow of another woman looming over her, but finds no one. When her husband comes out of the shower, she confronts him, but he evades with vague excuses. She hears a woman's voice whisper, "Only you..." She watches in horror as a shadow looms from behind him, wrapping him in its multiple arms. She sees his reflection in the mirror, and hears multiple voices declaring their love for him; feminine shadows with red eyes appear. His reflection promises to never leave her, then invites her to stay at his side, too. Her eyes turn red, she is enveloped in shadow, and she says monotonously, "Always... at your side..."
6	"Giveback-sama" "Okaeshi-sama" (オカエシサマ)	August 8, 2017
A girl named Yuka has lost her boyfriend Tomo to her best friend Rieko. At the library, she finds a book of magic rituals, and reads about Giveback-sama – Dial 9999 in a phone booth at 11:59 PM, and Giveback-sama will answer; if you ask, she will bring your lover back to you the next day. However, you must call back at the same time the next day to thank her, or else... That night, Yuka decides to try it. She calls at exactly 11:59 PM; when the call connects, she asks for Tomo, then leaves without hanging up. The next day at school, she learns Rieko had died in a traffic accident, and comforts a grieving Tomo. That night, Yuka remembers the final warning of the ritual and rushes to the phone booth with seconds to spare, only to find someone using it; to her horror, it's Rieko, who disappears as the clock strikes 12. Blood splatters inside the phone booth, and the phone receiver sways...
7	"Hide-and-Seek" "Kakurenbo" (隠連母)	August 13, 2017
Takeshi and his family are driving to his grandmother's house. As they pass an old, dilapidated house, he sees a boy in a red and white shirt looking out the second storey window. Upon arrival, Takeshi asks his grandmother about the house, but she sternly warns him to never go near it, as a crone lives there. His cousins invite him to play, and Takeshi accepts as a pretext to explore the old house. When they arrive, they play hide and seek, and Takeshi hides inside the house. He opens a closet, finding a straw doll wearing a red and white shirt. Suddenly, a deep voice calls out, "Are you ready?", and heavy footsteps come up the stairs; he hides in the closet. The closet opens and Takeshi screams as a giant eye peers at him... Takeshi's family bid each other goodbye, having forgotten him altogether; only his grandmother remembers. The old house has a new straw doll looking out the window; the sounds of children playing can be heard throughout.
8	"The Neighbors" "Otonari-san" (お隣さん)	August 27, 2017
A young woman named Kana moves to a new apartment and invites her friends over; the place just opened up and the rent was cheap. Suddenly, they hear scratching from next door. Kana walks her friends out, but freezes when she sees fingers and an eye through the neighbors' mail slot, which abruptly shuts. On her way back, the neighbors' door opens a bit, revealing a light from inside, which goes out. She hears the scratching again, and calls out, before peering inside. Moonbeams shine into the apartment, and Kana can see women clawing against the apartment walls and floors, wheezing and pleading to be let out. Suddenly, she hears the scratching from above; she sees a pair of feet dangle in front of her before a dark-haired pale girl with orange eyes, drops from the ceiling... The story ends with Kana joining the clawing neighbors and the hanging girl; a realtor answers a call asking about a new room that just opened up.
9	"If You Want to See Ghosts" "Yūrei o miru ni wa" (幽霊を見るには)	September 3, 2017
A gossip-loving college girl named Mai is chatting with her friend Miki, who says she's seen ghosts; Mai is skeptical. Miki tells her to look into her eyes – Mai sees in the reflection a white outline of a person behind her; Mai turns around, but nothing is there. Miki could see ghosts ever since her friend showed her, and now Mai can too. She asks Mai not to tell anyone – Miki has not heard from her friend since. Mai then leaves for class, ignoring Miki's pleas not to leave. When Mai arrives, she can see spectral outlines of people around the classroom. Mai spills the secret and warns her classmates to not tell anyone. Suddenly, the outlines turn red and give chase. Terrified, she flees the school. She runs to Miki's apartment for help, but finds her unconscious with her eyeballs removed. She recalls Miki's warning, and realizes she'd just doomed her friends to the same fate. The last thing she sees is red ghostly hands reaching for her, along with multiple voices sharing the secret and asking not to tell anyone else.
10	"Flower Reading" "Hana uranai" (花占い)	September 10, 2017
A man is caught in the rain on his way from work. A girl sitting nearby is reading flowers, plucking petals as she repeats, "It'll stop, it won't stop", concluding that the rain will not stop, and declares that her fortunes are always correct. The man chides her to go home; she plucks more petals, concluding that she will not. She asks for another subject to read, but he cannot think of any. She sees his wedding ring and offers to predict whether his wife will come; with the last petal, she predicts that she will. The man tells her that is impossible, but she points behind him, and to his astonishment, a woman in white approaches, holding an umbrella. The girl asks what should she read next, but he tells her she has done enough and thanks her. The girl watches as the couple leaves and begins another reading based on the man's life; at the last petal, she concludes that he is dead.
11	"I'm the Only One" "Hitori de ī" (ひとりでいい)	September 17, 2017
A young office worker named Mari admires her long, beautiful hair in the work bathroom mirror, as her coworkers admire it. When asked about her haircut, Mari denies having had it cut. In her apartment, combing her treasured hair at her mirror, Mari muses pettily to herself – she is the only one who must be beautiful. Nevertheless, she wonders why they asked about a haircut. The next day, Mari's friends hesitantly mention her hair is now even shorter. She angrily denies that she cut her hair, and storms out. That night, as Mari is staring into her mirror while brushing her hair, suddenly, her reflection smiles wickedly and says that it is not her anymore; the real Mari's hair is revealed to have been messily cut to shreds. As Mari panics, her reflection says that it does not need her anymore; the mirror cracks as the reflection emerges with a pair of scissors. Mari screams about her hair, as her reflection declares that Mari must die since only it "needs to be the prettiest". As Mari begs her reflection to give back her hair, the story ends with the sound of scissors snipping.
12	"The Last Bus" "Saishū basu" (最後バス)	September 24, 2017
An office worker boards the last bus of the day. She bemoans her life; things are sour with her boyfriend, and she will take the heat for a mistake at work that wasn't her fault. She falls asleep, and when she wakes, the bus is empty except for a young woman narrating a story; the tale mirrors her exact situation, but mentions her middle school best friend, who was often bullied. She often ignored it, afraid of being bullied herself, until her best friend committed suicide. The bus arrives, and she starts to disembark, but her best friend's ghost appears and asks for help. As the story ends, the woman approaches the office worker, telling her that being ignored is hell, that her actions will come back to her. Outside, the office worker is prostrate in pain, begging someone to notice her and help her. The woman laughs as they both vanish, unseen by anyone.
13	"Seductress" "Yūwaku" (誘惑)	October 1, 2017
Instead of the usual opening, the story begins with a detective investigating the disappearances of local young men. The trail leads to the Mantis Bar, where eyewitnesses say the missing men made contact with a particular woman. At the bar, a woman tells her date she "wants him", then leads him outside. Soon, the woman returns alone and finds another man at the bar, explaining that she got stood up, and says that she "wants him". They leave together, and the detective follows, watching from a distance. Suddenly, the woman's skin tears away, revealing a giant praying mantis underneath; the detective watches in horror as it devours the man. The mantis turns around and giggles as he screams; a yellow smiling mask falls... The detective wakes up on a park bench, late in the afternoon. As the kamishibaiya walks by with his bike and kamishibai theater, the opening theme begins to play, and the detective wonders what that case was really about, but "The truth of the case is lost in darkness". The story ends, revealing the title card.

=== Season 6 ===
No.	Official English title Original Japanese title	Original release date (Note: As season 6 premiered primarily in TV Tokyo's Sunday 26:35 (02:35 JST) time slot, the episodes technically aired the days following the ones listed.)
1	"Thunderous Visitor" "Raikyaku" (雷客)	July 6, 2018
The title is a pun on "raikyaku (来客; visitor)"; "rai (雷; lightning)" and "kyaku (客; guest)". A young man named Ryōsuke remembers his mother once promised to protect him from thunder when he was a child. She'd left shortly after, and he has since lived with his father. The power goes out and the phone rings; it's his mother. Ryōsuke angrily asks why she's calling; she explains it's because he remembered clinging to her during a storm as a little boy. A flash of lightning reveals a silhouette outside the balcony window. His mother asks to be let in to surprise his father. There is a knock on the glass; it's his father, who had forgotten his key. Ryōsuke lets him in, but then they realize someone else is in the room – Ryōsuke's mother. Ryōsuke explains that she called and asked to be let in, but his father says that's impossible. Ryōsuke then sees the rope marks around his mother's neck... The story ends with a clap of thunder.
2	"Tomonashi Cave" "Tomonashidō" (友無洞)	July 13, 2018
"Tomonashi (友無)" translates to "friendless". A group of high school students are taking a tour of Tomonashi Cave. Four girls, Tomoko, Ayaka, Kyouko and Akane, sneak into a roped-off area. Kyouko and Ayaka bully Tomoko, when suddenly, a sound emanates from the cave. The two bullies force Akane to investigate and unwillingly abandon Tomoko. Suddenly, the three girls scream for help. Tomoko calls out to Akane and asks what happened. From the shadows, Akane explains that she was afraid of Kyouko and Ayaka, and that's the reason why she didn't stand up to them, she asks Tomoko for forgiveness, which she grants. Heading deeper into the cave and approaching Akane, she finds claw marks all over the walls and floor. Akane is huddled in a corner, petrified. Tomoko reaches out for her when she is suddenly seized by ghostly hands. A possessed Akane derides Tomoko, refusing to help her and condemning her to death, as the hands drag Tomoko into the cave. The story ends as the wind blows through the cave, sounding like a sigh.
3	"The Wind's Warning" "Fūchi" (風知)	July 20, 2018
A salaryman, Hide, has just returned to his apartment, finding the balcony door wide open. He finds himself re-closing the balcony door several times through the evening, but on the last attempt, it won't budge. A fierce wind rips through the door, knocking him down and breaking a picture of Asami, his recently deceased girlfriend. The phone rings; he only hears static and a voice saying, "Shinē (die)." Thinking it's Asami's ghost, Hide blames himself for her death by being too lazy to go look for Tarou, and asks if she wants him to join her. Just then, the voice becomes clearer; it's been saying, "Shimenaide (Don't close it)." The wind blows a piece of paper beside him – a written promise to leave the door open if Tarou isn't there. Tarou, his and Asami's cat, walks in. Hide laughs in relief. Tarou purrs and meows.
4	"Swamp Offering" "Houjou" (奉沼)	July 27, 2018
The title could be a reference to "hōshō (宝生; treasure life"). A newlywed couple moves to the husband's rural home village. He explains the "swamp offering", an ancient custom where each villager tosses their most treasured possession into the nearby swamp to ward off disaster. The couple moves in with the husband's mother, who browbeats his wife and confiscates her ring (an heirloom from her own mother), and at the whose urging they take part in the swamp offering. They arrive at three trees tied together with Shimenawa and toss their items into the swamp. The wife sees her mother-in-law fling her mother's ring into the swamp, before gleefully and cruelly chiding her about throwing in fake treasures – telling her the Muddy will take what she truly treasures most. The wife runs home in tears. Later, the husband asks his mother to apologize, but the wife insists that it is her marital duty to treasure her mother-in-law. The next morning, the husband goes to wake his mother, only to find her gone; a trail of mud leads to her room. While he looks for her, his wife, with her mother's ring back on her soiled finger, mutters to herself about missing her "mother".
5	"The Dripping" "Shizuku" (雫来)	August 3, 2018
The title could be a pun; "shizuku (雫来)" can also be read as "shizukurai", which sounds like "shizuku kurai (雫暗い; drops of darkness)". A man named Shimada stops by a convenience store on his way home from work. It begins to rain, so he takes a stranger's umbrella from the rack. As he leaves, a creepy man in the corner chuckles to himself... As he walks home, he hears disembodied wheezing. Suddenly, reflected in a shop window, he sees a woman in white under the umbrella with him. She reaches for the handle, and Shimada drops the umbrella and flees. Once home, he is annoyed by the sound of dripping. He eventually finds the umbrella he left behind before angrily tossing it into the garbage. Inside, the dripping continues; a droplet lands on his leg, and he hears the wheezing. He slowly looks up; the ghastly woman is staring down at him, bug-eyed and disheveled, water dripping from her hair... Later, another patron at the convenience store takes the umbrella. The man, having gone insane, mutters to himself and smiles as he watches the other man leave.
6	"Cherry Blossom" "Sakura" (咲暗)	August 10, 2018
The title is a pun on "sakura (桜; cherry blossom)"; "saku (咲く; to blossom)" and "kura (暗; darkness)". A man named Shouta is hospitalized after a car accident. Through the wall, he hears children chattering that he might be a new friend to play with; after a short conversation, he agrees. The next morning, he asks a nurse about the kids in the next room, which confuses her. He finds a sakura petal in his bed, and the nurse confirms there is a sakura tree in the courtyard. That night, Shouta asks the kids about the tree. Some adult voices join the conversation, and after some suspicious chatter, ultimately insist that he hurry over to them, despite his broken leg. Curious, Shouta is about to go over, but is stopped by the nurse. The next morning, he is given a crutch, and he rushes to the next room, which is completely empty. Out in the courtyard, the sakura tree has been cut down; he overhears that people had hung themselves from it and realizes that he could have been next. As he turns to leave, he doesn't notice the ghostly aura of hanging bodies, who lament the pain, and promise that he will not get away.
7	"Frog Eggs" "Kaeru no tamago" (カエルの卵)	August 17, 2018
Takuya and his parents have moved to the countryside to help relieve his social anxiety. While walking down a trail, Takuya spots a pile of eyeball-like frog eggs in a stream, and becomes engrossed in staring at them. Three boys approach him, and become fascinated with the frog eggs as well. Takuya mutters that he found them first, and the boys start to pester him, which makes him uncomfortable. Then he sees other people staring, triggering his anxiety, and flees, refusing to leave his room. At 2:00 AM, he wakes up and decides to take the frog eggs for himself. At the riverbank, he sees the eggs as eyes, and one of them moves, startling him... The next morning, Takuya's parents finding him staring at a fish tank, and explain that his grandfather wants to take him fishing after breakfast; Takuya consents, much to their relief. As they leave, Takuya stares at the frog eggs moving in the fish tank, saying that other people's eyes don't bother him anymore. His empty eye sockets bleed...
8	"Sea Fortunes" "Umikuji" (海籤)	August 24, 2018
The title is a wordplay on "umi (海; ocean)" and "o-mikuji (御神籤; temple fortunes)". A crowd gathers at the docks around a soaked, frightened woman named Chisato. Her husband Taīchi tries to console her, but she warns him to keep away. Chisato explains that she and Taīchi were strolling on the beach one foggy day; he returned to their hotel, so she strolled on alone. She found a shrine in a small cove with a fortunes box, from which she drew a fortune with a red pattern. Chisato's ears suddenly began to ring, and a black fog rolled in, and she fled. Later, Chisato wanted to leave the island; she heard voices telling her that anyone who prays for a good catch and draws a good fortune is to be sacrificed. Suddenly, she found herself on a boat at sea, surrounded by shadowy boatmen. A spectral baby appeared next to her and she asked why this was happening to her; the baby turned demonic and answered, "There is no other sacrifice", before she was swept away by a large wave. The locals explain sacrifices stopped ages ago. Chisato calls herself cursed and tries to flee, only to trip and fall into the arms of a fisherman. Her blanket falls off, revealing a strange red pattern on her arm. With a twisted smile, a possessed Chisato tells him in a male voice, "Mister, you drew a good fortune." A black fog rolls in...
9	"Mud Games" "Deigi" (泥戯)	August 31, 2018
One rainy day, a woman is driving to pick up her daughter Michiko from daycare. In the car, she scolds Michiko for not washing her hands after playing in the sandbox, but promises to play with her next time. She asks Michiko what she made in the sandbox; Michiko says she was making her family, which made her sad because her mother died. She says that she was coming to get her, but there was a crash and a splat. Michiko watched as her mother died, and eventually she herself died of illness from staying out in the rain. Suddenly, to her mother's horror, Michiko turns into sand and falls apart. Michiko's mother then realizes she never made it to the daycare, but died in a car crash en route. As she turns to sand, she apologizes to Michiko... At the park, a boy and his mother are walking by the sandbox when the boy sees something move in it. His mother points out it was just sand piles dissolving in the rain. The sand piles were shaped like a mother and child, and there are tires close to them in the sandbox.
10	"Tree of Innocence" "Mujaki" (無邪樹)	September 7, 2018
The title is a wordplay on "mujaki (無邪気; innocent)" and "ki (樹; tree)". Young twin brothers, Satoshi and Takashi, are playing in the woods. Takashi challenges Satoshi to a race to the top of a very tall tree. Satoshi wins, but looks down to find Takashi clinging onto a branch about to break. Satoshi climbs over to him, but hears his mother call out for him to get down, citing what happened to Takashi. Satoshi then looks down to find Takashi is not there. Then he remembers – a week ago, Satoshi dared Takashi to retrieve a bird's nest, causing him to fall to his death. A laughing, black-eyed Takashi appears; only Satoshi can see him. Satoshi falls from the branch, but survives, and his mother walks him home. However, it is revealed that Takashi is in Satoshi's body; he drops a dead baby bird and silently bids Satoshi goodbye. Alone in the tree, Satoshi begs Takashi to give him back his body, as his eyes turn black.
11	"Frozen Memories" "Kakuhyō" (覚氷)	September 14, 2018
A hiker is caught in a blizzard on a mountain trail, so he takes shelter in a shack with a shivering old man huddled in the corner. As the hiker rests, he remembers he'd promised to take his son Takeru mountain climbing after his surgery; his wife Shinobu worried they wouldn't return, but he reassured her. Suddenly, he hears a bell, and asks the old man what it was. The old man says "It's coming again..." He grabs the hiker abruptly and warns him to not open the door until the blizzard passes, no matter what. Later, the hiker hears that the ringing has stopped. Suddenly, he hears a voice calling out to him from outside; it's his "son" Takeru, begging him to open the door, he's about to open it, when the old man stops him. The hiker shoves aside the old man, who begs him not to open the door; he's the last survivor of his hiking group – whatever is outside took all the others. "Takeru" asks his father if he's upset that he died, this causes him to remember that Takeru died in surgery and relents. When the blizzard passes, the hiker calls his wife to tell her he's coming back. Outside, he finds a pile of snow shaped like a child...
12	"Waterfall Drop" "Taki oto" (滝落)	September 21, 2018
The title could be a wordplay on "takioto (滝音; waterfall sound)"; "oto (音; sound)" is a homophone of "oto (落; to fall)". Four friends are hiking through the forest to a waterfall, reputedly haunted by the people who committed suicide by jumping from it. One of them, Yurika, gets an uncomfortable feeling of being watched, before being chosen, via rock-paper-scissors, to climb to the top of the fall. As she makes her way up, the sun begins to set. When she reaches the top, she looks down to see her friends waving at her. She notices three children dropping rocks off the waterfall, and scolds them; they simply stare at her creepily and walk away. Yurika looks down and her friends are still waving. She gets a text from them, telling her to flee. Suddenly, black shadows start climbing up the waterfall toward her... The three children laugh and point as they say, "Aw, they got to the top. Now there'll be another one."
13	"Echoes" "Yamabiko" (山曳呼)	September 28, 2018
The title is a wordplay on "yamibiko (山彦; echo)"; "hiki/biki (曳; pulling/towing)" and "ko (呼; call)", together, can mean summoning. In the intro and outro, the kamishibaiya whispers. A college two girls named Eriko and Shiho have hiked to the top of a mountain. Eriko shouts into the valley to hear her voice echo, even as fog rolls in; her friend wants to leave. They hear a man's voice echo; Eriko replies in kind, but Shiho admonishes her. The fog thickens, and the voice then says it's coming over. Shiho wants to flee, but has lost her in the fog. The voice says it's almost there. Suddenly, figures appear in the fog, as several voices shout to her; some warn her to run, others to stay put. She hears Eriko call for help and looks around frantically, but then the figures disappear. Suddenly, a hand grabs her shoulder, frightening her; it's Eriko. As the fog clears, the two girls make their way down the mountain. Shiho explains how scary the whole situation was. Suddenly, fog rolls in again, Eriko has disappeared, and the man's voice from earlier echoes right next to her saying, "I'm here."

=== Season 7 ===
No.	Official English title Original Japanese title	Original release date (Note: As season 7 premiered primarily in TV Tokyo's Sunday 26:15 (02:15 JST) time slot, the episodes technically aired the days following the ones listed.)
1	"Delivery" "Otodokemono" (お届け物)	July 7, 2019
A young man agrees to housesit for his friend Hasegawa, as well as sign for a parcel, which arrives at 9:15 PM. Hasegawa asks him to receive another parcel for him the next day. It arrives at the same time the next night, after which he calls Hasegawa, who doesn't answer. Just then, he sees the deliveryman staring up at him from the street. He hears a phone vibrating from inside the second parcel. He calls Hasegawa again, reaching him this time, and asks when he is coming home. "What are you talking about?" Hasegawa asks, "I just did." Suddenly, the boxes start to leak blood and the deliveryman returns with more parcels...
2	"The Sleepless Child" "Nemurenai Kodomo"眠れない子供	July 14, 2019
A woman named Sawako awaits her husband's return; he calls to tell her he'll be back late. She listens uneasily to the news before putting her son Takeru to bed. That night, Sawako is awakened by the sound of a broken glass in the kitchen; Takeru had a nightmare, so she invites him to sleep in her bed if he has another. At 2:04 AM, Sawako wakes from a nightmare to find a child sleeping next to her. The phone rings, which she answers in the hallway; her husband is on his way home. As she bids him to hurry, the bedroom door opens, and muddy handprints and footprints appear all over the floor and walls. She realizes that it must be the child she had accidentally run over. A boy's laughter replaces her husband's voice on the line. She cries that his death was an accident, that she unwillingly buried him in the mountains, and begs for forgiveness; the voice refuses. Takeru comes out of his room and asks what's wrong; she's covered in dirt and the hand and footprints have disappeared. Sawako then realizes that the child in her bed is not her son...
3	"The Reception Room" "Ōsetsuma"応接間	July 21, 2019
An elderly childless couple had lived together for a long time. One day, a skilled dollmaker gives them a beautiful doll with lifelike eyes, which they display in their reception room. The wife, Yōko, had always wanted a daughter, and the doll, which she names Mikoto (美琴; "beautiful life"), is her dream come true. Yōko gives Mikoto gifts, including a red dress intended for the daughter she never had, and a bracelet that belonged to her mother. Her husband eventually dies of illness, leaving her all alone with Mikoto. She doesn't have much time left herself, and wishes she could have heard Mikoto call her "Mother" just once, then dies. Suddenly, Mikoto comes to life and approaches Yōko's body. She sheds a tear and says, "Mother. Thank you."
4	"Paintings" "Kaiga"絵画	July 28, 2019
A young man goes to a free art exhibit called "A New World"; it's empty, except for the receptionist, a woman in a dark coat and black fedora. He finds the art pieces creepy and grotesque; strangely, they are all by unknown artists. He's about to photograph a painting, but the receptionist tells him it's not allowed. When he's sure she's not looking, he takes the photos anyway and uploads them to his social media. He notices that the paintings are gone from their frames. Suddenly, the receptionist appears, murmuring that she warned him; he is horrified to find that she has no face, but a blank sheet of skin. He suddenly finds himself in a void, surrounded by many reaching hands. He runs for an exit, only to be dragged back into the darkness. Later, a new patron comes to the art exhibit where a new painting has been added; the painting of the previous young man, the new patron takes a photo of it.
5	"Notice of Termination of Service" "Shūryō no oshirase"終了のお知らせ	August 4, 2019
A salaryman named Hamano on a business trip passes by three different funerals on the same day; though strange, he quickly dismisses it. He settles down into his hotel room, noticing an odd entry at the bottom of the TV program guide, "Notice of Termination of Service". After a shower, he turns on the TV; only static comes on, and now he can't turn the TV off. Images of the deceased from the funerals earlier appear onscreen, and a voice repeats, "The time has come to say goodbye." Suddenly, the door rattles and the phone starts ringing; he answers the phone, but there's no one there. The commotion continues; the man cowers and pleads for it all to stop, which it suddenly does. There is a knock at the door, and the voice of the desk clerk asks if everything is alright. He opens the door, but instead of the desk clerk, he sees shadows, and the TV turns back on. He sees his own picture on the screen and the voice says, "Goodbye."
6	"The Veranda" "Beranda"ベランダ	August 11, 2019
An office worker returns to her apartment after work, and is frightened by a scraping sound coming from the veranda. She grabs a knife and opens the curtain, but finds nothing. Six days later, she calls her boyfriend Daichi – the sounds frighten her daily, which he dismisses since the veranda is always empty. She hears the sound again and begs him to hurry over. Once there, he hears the sound and cautiously opens the curtain and goes out onto the veranda, but finds nothing. His girlfriend says, "She's been watching this whole time." He looks out to the veranda and to his horror, he sees a ghastly woman with green skin, yellow eyes, and long fingernails scratching the glass. He snaps the curtains closed. His girlfriend feels the creature possessing her. "And when you're scared," she says in a scratchy voice, "It's better to be with someone, right?" as she begins scratching the floor with long fingernails...
7	"Public Phone" "Kōshūdenwa"公衆電話	August 18, 2019
A door-to-door insurance saleswoman named Chie gets a call from her sister Momoe from a public phone. Momoe pleads for help and gives her location, imploring her to hurry before "he" shows up, then the call ends abruptly. Chie finds the phone booth; it's empty except for a pile of broken cell phones. The booth phone rings; she answers it and hears deep breathing before Momoe's voice warns her that "he's" coming. The booth door slams closed, and a creature with grey skin and red eyes starts banging on the glass. Chie tries to use her cellphone, which instantly breaks. Momoe tells her to use a phone card in the booth to call for help, but to hang up before the prepaid minutes run out, or else the creature will get in. Chie calls her husband Shōhei for help, and gives him her location. She hangs up, but the phone still counts the minutes down to zero. Suddenly, she hears Momoe's voice, apologizing for lying. "The moment you got here," The voice deepens, "... it was all over for you." The creature lunges at her... Later, Shōhei finds the phone booth.
8	"Cough" "Seki"咳	August 25, 2019
A young man, Takayuki, has to put up with his elderly neighbor's noise complaints; the walls are thin, so his neighbor can hear his TV at even its lowest volume. Takayuki explains he's not doing anything wrong, but the old man, who is related to the landlord, threatens to have him evicted. Later, Takayuki invites his girlfriend over to watch a movie. When they hear him coughing, they decide to just leave and watch TV at her house. But as the coughing worsens, she tells Takayuki to call an ambulance. He hesitates; if the old man dies, he won't have to worry about eviction. He decides to ignore it, despite his girlfriend's protests. Finally, the coughing stops. Suddenly, the lights go out and the coughing returns, growing louder. The walls begin to shake. The couple looks behind them to see the ghost of the old man who shouts, "YOUR TV IS TOO DAMN LOUD!"
9	"The Woman in the Elevator" "Erebētā no On'na"エレベーターの女	September 1, 2019
A young woman is riding her apartment building's elevator, and is soon joined by an attractive young man carrying a garbage bag. The elevator soon breaks down; the young man points out a call button and a camera monitoring the elevator, in case of emergencies. He puts down the bag and presses the call button; a repairman answers and checks the camera, saying he sees one man and two women, which confuses both passengers. Suddenly, the call is cut off and the lights go out. A crying ghostly woman slowly claws her way from the garbage bag; the man warns the woman not to look. Suddenly, the lights come back on, the elevator starts back up, and the ghost is gone. When they finally reach the bottom, the landlord asks if they're okay. The young man excuses himself, as he's in a hurry. As he carries the garbage bag outside, the woman realizes it is not garbage day...
10	"Manga Cafe" "Manga Kissa"漫画喫茶	September 8, 2019
A manga cafe employee named Matsudera pockets an object while cleaning, assuming it to be a pachinko ball. A young lady inquires about a lost earring, leaving abruptly when told that no one has seen it. Later, the woman is seen silently pacing back and forth past the front desk. Disturbed by this, the young staffer reports to the manager Umeda-san, who is in disbelief; the reason is not yet revealed to the viewer. While the staffer is cleaning, he somehow cannot find the front desk. He runs down the corridor before coming to a dead end outside of a booth, where he sees a pair of high heels under the door. He is suddenly forced inside and the door slams shut. A lady's voice asks him to return her earring; he denies having it, and begs to be released. She creeps down from the ceiling, insisting it is in his pocket, and tells him she wanted the expensive earrings so badly that she sold her eyes, revealing her empty eye sockets. Umeda-san's story is revealed – the lady was a regular customer who frequented that booth, and had died in an accident; she was found with her eyeballs missing. She closes in on him, admiring his eyes...
11	"Little Sister's Room" "Imoto no Heya"妹の部屋	September 15, 2019
An fat glasses man named Taiji goes into his younger sister Miho's room, looking for one of his manga. He finds it under the bed, but gets stuck trying to retrieve it. Before he can free himself, he hears Miho return with her friend Risa, so he remains hidden. He listens to their gossip when suddenly, one of the posters on the wall falls. Miho says that strange things have been happening in her room lately, for which she dismissively blames her brother. Risa disagrees; she has a sixth sense and can feel something wrong... The brother suddenly drops the manga and the girls shriek. Just when Miho is about to look under the bed, Risa warns her not to, before fleeing the room with Miho chasing after her. The brother is about to crawl out from under the bed when something grabs him. He looks back and sees a woman with a gaunt, pale face and black hair gripping his ankles, who quickly drags him back under the bed.
12	"Fitting Room" "Shichakushitsu"試着室	September 22, 2019
A young office lady named Kyōko walks into a small fashion boutique to pass some time; it's unattended, but filled with garments from her youth. She grabs a few to try on, but the fitting room door is closed; a sign on the door limits customers to take in only 1 item at a time. She opens the door, finding the room empty; mannequins are visible in the mirror. The shop is deserted, so she takes in her multiple items anyway. As she tries on the outfits, she hears the voices of her school friends and parents praising her in her memory, filling her with happiness. As she tries on her last outfit, the door rattles. Suddenly, the voices from her memories start haughtily jeering and insulting her. The voices surround Kyōko in a great din, as she desperately tries to leave the fitting room, to no avail... Later, a new customer opens the fitting room door, and a new mannequin stares back from the mirror.
13	"Refrigerator" "Reizōko"冷蔵庫	September 29, 2019
This story is told by a refrigerator. When it was first bought by a family of five, it was happy, and loved being filled with delicous, wholesome foods. But as time passes, family troubles arise and arguments flare frequently. The refrigerator is sad to be getting emptier, and its few contents often go rotten. Soon, no one opens the refrigerator anymore, and it starts to feel lonely. Then one day, the family returns with strange smiles on their faces, chanting, "It's the only way", as they place packaged meat into the refrigerator; meat that is somehow oddly familiar. The refrigerator notices that the father is no longer there. And it notices something even more peculiar – throughout the years, the youngest son never seems to age.

=== Season 8 ===
No.	Official English title Original Japanese title	Original release date (Note: As season 8 premiered primarily in TV Tokyo's Sunday 26:15 (02:15 JST) time slot, the episodes technically aired the days following the ones listed.)
1	"Dropped Handkerchief" "Hankachi Otoshi"ハンカチ落とし	January 11, 2021
A group of teens sneak into an abandoned house. As they explore, they discuss the rumors about the sudden disappearances of the occupants and anyone who wanted the house demolished. The teens go upstairs to the youngest child's bedroom, said to be the most haunted, and begin partying. Suddenly, a diary drops to the floor, open to an entry – "We played the handkerchief game." One of the girls, Shizuka, finds a pink handkerchief on the ground behind one of the boys, Takaaki. Suddenly, the candle goes out. The other boy, Shinji, turns on his phone light, and Takaaki is gone. Shizuka sees the handkerchief is now behind her friend Kyōko. Shinji's phone light flickers, and when it comes back on, Kyōko is gone. Shinji dismisses it as a prank, but Shizuka sees the handkerchief is now behind her. Terrified, she tosses it behind Shinji, who vanishes when the light flickers again. Alone, Shizuka watches as the phone battery dies. A child's voice speaks, "Now you're it." The handkerchief turns red...
2	"Death Day" "Meinichi"命日	January 18, 2021
The Kunitake siblings spend the day at their family home each year on the anniversary of their mother's death as a tradition; Sachiko, newly married into the family, is taking part for the first time. After dinner, the lights go out, and her husband Hiroki calls her to the table; dogs outside bark, as they do every year. He explains that they have this tradition because his mother's spirit comes home each year on this day. They hear footsteps outside the door, the dining room door opens and closes, and an empty chair pulls up as if an invisible person has taken a seat. Sachiko is terrified – she can see spirits, and the spirit in the chair is not their mother. The dogs outside bark louder, and the chair suddenly shakes violently, then falls over. This shocks the Kunitakes – what have they been letting in all these years?
3	"Don't Look Back" "Ushiro wo miru na"うしろを見るな	January 25, 2021
A young man named Takuya gets lost on the way to see his friend, who is giving him directions over the phone. As he approaches an alleyway, his cell signal dies. A sign at the entrance warns not to look back from that point on. As he goes down the alley, he happens upon a distressed young woman named Miyako, who joins him on his path and warns him not to look back. She explains that her boyfriend Toshihiko vanished when he looked back after he heard voices call him; she's been trapped in the alleyway ever since. Takuya dismisses her story, but when she hears footsteps, she stops dead in her tracks and panics. Toshihiko's voice thanks Takuya for escorting Miyako, and asks her to turn around. She warns Takuya to not listen, but he turns to reply. Fog starts rolling in; he sees shadows in the windows of the nearby houses as the fog swallows him... Later, Takuya's friend is looking for him, and enters the alleyway, ignoring the sign.
4	"Bean-Throwing" "Mamemaki"豆まき	February 1, 2021
A young boy named Yōta suspects that his mother is in league with a demon, having seen shadows through her shōji screen at night. At school, his teacher explains the annual tradition of bean-throwing to ward off demons. Yōta comes to believe that his mother welcomes the demon out of loneliness, and that he must protect her. One evening, he confronts his mother, blaming the demon for his father's absence, for which she angrily admonishes him. Later that night, he approaches his mother's room with a bag of soybeans; he hears his mother speaking with a man, who is worried about Yōta "catching on". Yōta yanks open the door and begins pelting them with soybeans in the darkness, until something crashes through the window. He turns on the light; the room is empty, and the window is broken as though someone had jumped out of it. He feels an odd sensation on his forehead...
5	"The Sound of Laughter" "Waraigoe"笑い声	February 8, 2021
A high school boy named Shinya is studying in his room late one night when he hears a faint sound, like an old woman's wheezy laugh, from outside. He looks out his window, but finds no one. He hears the sound again from the kitchen, closer than before. He asks his mother if any of the neighbors could be making the sound, which she denies. He hears the sound again in the shower, much closer this time, and sees a shadow pass by the bathroom window. On his way to his room, he clearly hears an old woman cackling at the front door. He is about to look through the peephole, when his parents confront him. He tells them about the cackling woman, and his father looks through the peephole; after a long beat, he reports that no one is outside, and scolds his son, while beginning to laugh loudly and uncontrollably. His mother soon joins in. The old woman's laughter echoes in the full moon.
6	"Catch of the Day" "Tsuri no Seika"釣りの成果	February 15, 2021
A man named Nobuo comes home from a fishing trip with his friend Sakakibara in a dour mood. His wife Eiko tries to open his cooler to look at his catch, but he slams it closed, warning her that it is unsightly. The cooler shakes, as though the catch is still alive, but Nobuo forcefully tells her to leave it alone. That night, Nobuo suddenly gets out of bed and stiffly walks out. Eiko follows him to the kitchen; the cooler is open, and he's chopping something which is loudly squeaking. Nobuo almost notices her, so she hurries back to bed. The next morning, Eiko finds Nobuo asleep in his bed, his covers messily thrown over him. She investigates the kitchen, but finds nothing unusual. Sakakibara's wife calls in a tearful panic, asking if Nobuo had eaten their catch – ever since Sakakibara ate it, he's been acting strangely. Suddenly, the line goes dead. Eiko then hears Nobuo groaning; his bedding squirms and undulates. As she's about to pull off the covers, Nobuo leaps at her from underneath it and she and screams.
7	"Issun Boushi" "一寸法師"	February 22, 2021
The title of this story is a reference to a traditional Japanese fairy tale of the same name. Before class, a college couple, Nanako and Miyama, discuss Issun Bōshi, a creature who grants a wish to whoever catches him. Miyama teases their incel friend Niimi (who had a crush on Nanako before Miyama started dating her)to catch him, so he can wish for a girlfriend. Just then, a small shadow scurries between Niimi's feet. On his way home, the shadow passes in front of his eyes and he pursues it into a garden, only to find a blood splatter on the bottom of his shoe. The next day, Niimi suffers from intense stomach pains. In the restroom, his side suddenly painfully bulges, as if punched from inside, he realizes it's the Issun Bōshi. Issun Bōshi threatens to continue doing this until Niimi "punishes" Miyama for spreading rumors about him, before punching Niimi all over his body. Just then, Miyama enters the restroom, and Niimi apologizes and prepares to do Issun Bōshi's bidding without any hesitation. Niimi exits the restroom to find Nanako; Issun Bōshi wants her punished for laughing at him. Niimi apologizes to Nanako before smiling like a creepy predator and he proceeds to punish her like the psychopath that he is.
8	"Viewing" "Kyūkō"柩仰	March 1, 2021
A high school girl named Ohnuma receives a call from a teacher – the school will be closed the next day to host a viewing, so students are not to go to campus. Later, Ohnuma and her friends discuss the strange notice and agree to meet at school to investigate. When Ohnuma arrives, her friends text her that they are inside waiting for her. There are no teachers, but the classrooms are full of sullen students, and she finds her friends. The PA announces that the viewing is about to begin, and she takes her seat. The door opens, and the entire class issues droning cries in unison. Students drag a coffin up the hallway with ropes. Suddenly, the room is silent and everyone is staring at Ohnuma. She flees to the back of the classroom, where the coffin is slowly opening; a black mist emanates from within. When the lid fully opens, she sees herself inside, surrounded by the black mist, before she vanishes. Outside, Ohnuma's friends have arrived late; not seeing her, they quickly decide to hang out elsewhere.
9	"Antlion Pit" "Arijigoku"蟻地獄	March 8, 2021
A young office worker named Saki works diligently as her coworkers gossip about their absent colleague Makiko. The next day, Saki finds an unfamiliar park while on break, where she is suddenly struck with a vision – she is in a desert under a dark sky. A line of ants wanders by an antlion pit at her feet. As Saki watches an ant sink, a voice asks if she is tired, and she suddenly finds herself sinking into the sand. She snaps out of it, then returns to her office. Her manager scolds her about her work, and she wishes she could go far away. The next day, en route to work, Saki finds herself at the park, then back in the desert. Makiko's voice asks if she wants to go far away, before she suddenly falls into a sandpit. At the bottom, an emaciated Makiko invites Saki to join her... A young man tries to find his way on the street, when he comes upon the park, which is not on his map. He sees a line of people in a desert under a dark sky. When he gets closer, they turn, revealing their emaciated faces; they laugh as he begins sinking into the sand.
10	"Footprints in the Snow" "Yuki no ashiato"雪の足跡	March 15, 2021
A young girl, Sayuki, and her big brother go out to play in the snowy woods near their home. As they build a snowman together, Sayuki's brother tells her about a monster he and his friends saw. They look for materials to finish the snowman, but while Sayuki is looking away, her brother disappears. She follows his footprints, until she finds multiple sets of prints, which are then replaced by giant ones. She tries signaling her brother with her hat bells; she hears bells in reply, and is initially relieved, until she finds a glove next to what looks like a large sled trail. She is beckoned onward by the bells, finding clothing strewn about, until she stumbles upon blood in the snow. She turns to get help, but finds her footprints gone. She hears more bells, and desperately signals with her own. Then she hears a dragging sound approach through the snow...
11	"Curse" "Tatari"祟り	March 22, 2021
A high school boy named Kōichi crashes his bicycle, accidentally beheading a Jizo statue. Later, his friend tells him that the whole town is abuzz about the incident, and warns him he will be cursed, which Kōichi dismisses. That night, a man in a suit and hat pelts his window with pebbles before slinking away, grumbling that the curse hasn't happened yet. The next morning, schoolgirls gossip excitedly about the statue. He sees the man in the suit, scaring him into nearly getting hit by a car. Near school, he lashes out at his friends that everyone is watching him to ogle at the curse, which they deny. He then sees a huge mob gathering, chanting 'Get cursed'. He flees in a panic, and is slowly surrounded by people who want him cursed, including the man in the suit, with glowing eyes. He flees until he falls down a long flight of stairs. On the ground below, next to his lifeless body, the detached head of the statue rolls toward Kōichi's corpse with an expression of utter delight and glowing eyes.
12	"String Telephone" "Ito Denwa"糸電話	March 29, 2021
A man named Tatsuhiko is playing with his daughter Moeka with a string telephone. Moeka leaves the room, and a woman's voice speaks from the cup. He runs to Moeka's room to find her talking to someone through her cup, reportedly a lady who wants to talk to him. Moeka leaves for lunch. It is revealed that Tatsuhiko had an affair with a woman named Yukari, which he ended for his family's sake. He hides the string phone away in a drawer. That night, he is awoken by a telephone ringing. Moeka answered the string phone, and hands him the cup. Yukari's voice greets him, and he demands she leave him and his family alone. He slams the cup down, and the voice laughs. Tatsuhiko's family eventually abandons him to his madness, and his apartment fills with trash. He desperately follows the string to a closet, and throws it open, finding nothing but the other cup, which is then grasped by a shadow hand. Tatsuhiko screams as the closet slams shut behind him, and Yukari's voice rejoices that they can be together forever.
13	"Sleep-talking" "Negoto"寝言	April 5, 2021
A college boy and his childhood friend Kido reminisce about a hide-and-seek game wherein Kido was abandoned while hiding. Owing to the late hour, he invites Kido to stay over. The next morning, the room has been ransacked; Kido tells him that he did it in his sleep, searching for something, but wouldn't say what. The young man abruptly leaves for work. Upon returning, he decides to set up a camera. He wakes up in the middle of the night, and the room is a mess. He checks the footage – he was searching the room in his sleep. A pile of papers and an old photo fell to the floor, and Kido's voice asked what he was looking for. Still asleep, the young man said he was looking for Kido, who replied that it's no longer necessary. The young man looks at the old photo, which is of himself, Kido, and another friend as kids; Kido is slowly vanishing. Kido's voice tells him not to worry, as someone will search for him next. The photo falls to the floor; both he and Kido have vanished.

=== Season 9 ===
No.	Official English title Original Japanese title	Original release date
1	"Rat's Wedding" "So Totsugi" (鼠嫁ぎ)	July 11, 2021
Teranishi is on a business trip to the country, and is being shown around town by his manager Mr. Sagawa. As the townsfolk decorate the street, Mr. Sagawa explains the town custom of the "Rat's Wedding" – marriages must be preceded by a death in the community. It's believed that the deceased reincarnates as the child born to the newlyweds, who is cared for by the community; this keeps the townsfolk close, and the town's population stable. A funeral procession with six decedents enters the crematorium, from which the nuptial parade and many wedding guests quickly emerge, carrying the bride on a palanquin, but no groom. Suddenly, the crowd surrounds Teranishi, congratulating him profusely, and locks him into the temple with the bride, who greets him with a twisted smile. He wakes up in a hotel suite. A woman emerges from the bathroom, and presents him with six ghastly, ratlike babies in a basket, flashing her twisted smile and glowing eyes.
2	"The Man in the Rabbit Hutch" "Usagikoya no Otoko"兎小屋の男	July 18, 2021
A young elementary school teacher is grading writing assignments late one night, until she comes across one titled 'The Man in the Rabbit Hutch'. Its author Takuya wrote about how he was assigned to tend the school's rabbit hutch. However, he was scared of a shadowy man who lived in the corner of the hutch, seemingly invisible to everyone else; thus he avoided the hutch as much as possible. One day, his teacher praised his bravery for eating his bell peppers at lunch, and encouraged him to use that courage elsewhere in life. This inspired him to confront the shadow man and ask him to leave; he agreed, but only if Takuya found him a new place to live. Takuya eventually led the shadow man to his teacher's apartment, thinking she could befriend him. Suddenly, her desk lamp goes out, and she feels a sudden chill in the air. The shadow man appears in the corner...
3	"The 44th Sheep" "Yonjuuyon-hikime no Hitsuji"44匹目の羊	July 25, 2021
A college student named Hayakawa finds his friend Irie looking ill; he has insomnia, and even medication doesn't help. Hayakawa suggests counting sheep, but Irie angrily refuses out of fear of the 44th Sheep, and storms off without explaining. That night, Hayakawa, out of curiosity, decides to try it anyway. Upon reaching 44, he gets a frantic call from Irie saying the 44th Sheep has come for him, which ends abruptly. Hayakawa tries repeatedly to call him back, to no avail. The next morning, he angrily confronts Irie, who tells him that the 44th Sheep is coming for him next. Hayakawa demands that Irie faces him, but is horrified by his face. A professor distracts him, and Irie vanishes; in truth, Irie has been missing. That night, Hayakawa hears Irie's voice counting sheep; he begs in vain for it to stop, seeing a spectral ram. The count reaches 44, and nothing happens. He sighs with relief... then his eye transforms into that of a sheep...
4	"Lapdog" "Chūken"忠犬	August 2, 2021
A young woman named Hori starts a petsitting business. Her first client is an old woman who lives in the country with a Shiba inu named Umeta that she'd found abandoned, but lacks the strength to walk him herself. Out of pity for Umeta, and for the generous pay, Hori accepts the job. One evening, she is approached by a detective who asks her about a rash of illegal corpse disposals in the area, and warns her against staying out late. She informs her employer, who offers to let her quit for her safety, but she decides to stay on. She continues the job for several weeks, until on one of the walks, she trips over a hand protruding from the dirt, and screams. Her employer approaches her, holding a kitchen knife, and she panics; suddenly, with a chomping sound, the old woman is being dragged away. The police arrive and find the old woman's corpse, but not Umeta; Hori is convinced Umeta saved her life. When she arrives home, she finds Umeta waiting for her at her doorstep, and greets him warmly, suddenly, there's a chomping sound again. That night, Umeta is burying something in a park...
5	"Papier-mâché Tiger" "Hariko no Tora"張子の虎	August 9, 2021
A disheveled man stares at a child's drawing and reminisces. Some time ago, he and his family had just purchased an apartment. His son Kiyoto left for school ahead of him one morning, but died in a traffic accident en route, leaving behind the papier-mâche bobblehead tiger they made together. His wife left out of grief, but he stayed in the apartment to preserve Kiyoto's memory. In the present, the man suffers from loneliness and survivor's guilt, and talks to his son through the toy tiger, asking him to stay with him; the door creaks open and the tiger nods, as if in reply. He asks if it's Kiyoto; the tiger nods again, moving him to overjoyed tears. Later, he prepares for his first day of his new job as a truck driver, pocketing his son's drawing. The tiger nods continuously as he departs. Once he's out the door, the tiger begins shaking its head about wildly. The drawing falls, indicating the man's death, and the tiger's head falls.
SP	"The Old Well" "Koito"古井戸	August 13, 2021
This episode plays in a narrow vertical format, for visual effect. A college girl named Misaka is sitting in despair at the bottom of a very deep disused well in the woods. She is found by her classmate Nishiwaki, who tries to rescue her with a rope. Suddenly, water begins to seep in through the floor and quickly rises. Misaka bids Nishiwaki to hurry, but his rope is too short, so he runs off to get another. As the water continues to rise, she sees a face just below the surface. An arm rises out of the water, then the top of a head; Misaka calls for help, as the water rises above her head. She swims upward, away from a figure grabbing at her ankle. She can see the exit through the water, but when she breaches the surface, she finds herself in the exact same place. She then sees her own head breach the surface next to her, and the water level keeps rising. She continues swimming desperately for the surface, reaching for someone swimming ahead of her...
6	"Spirit Ox" "Seirei ushi"精霊牛	August 15, 2021
A man wakes from a nap one early evening, as his wife Akiko is cooking dinner. She made his favorites; he asks why, but gets a vague, dismissive reply. They enjoy eating together, until he notices his photo on the altar. A silhouette appears on the shoji screen door... The man wakes from a nap, and Akiko is cooking dinner. She made his favorites; they talk, but he can't shake his déjà vu. He sees his photo on the altar, and asks Akiko about it, but before she can answer, a bull's silhouette appears on the shoji screen door... The man awakes from his nap, certain he is repeating the same day. At dinner, he asks Akiko how many times he's repeated the same day, and if he's died. Akiko confirms his death, but he hasn't been repeating the same day; he has been home for three days. He realizes whose shadow he has been seeing, and that he must go. He thanks her for having him home again this year, and they bid each other goodbye. An elderly Akiko informs her grown daughter that her father had just left for the year, but only she could see him. The daughter muses about whether she will get to see him next year.
7	"Mr. Rooster" "Niwatori-kun"ニワトリ君	August 22, 2021
A small town punk band hires a mysterious bassist known only as Mr. Rooster, whom bandmate Mikio finds very unsettling – he frequently spaces out, but won't tell anyone why; elderly townspeople shower him in gratitude for "showing the way", but won't explain what that means; and just thinking about Mr. Rooster is physically exhausting. While recording, Mikio can't stay awake; he suspects paranormal activity involving Mr. Rooster. During a set, Mr. Rooster spaces out, and Mikio becomes drowsy; before he passes out, he sees Mr. Rooster inhaling a shadow. That evening, he confronts Mr. Rooster, accusing him of being an angel of death. Mr. Rooster tells him that those who witness what Mikio has must join the dead, then beckons a crowd of souls to take him to the other side; this scares Mikio into agreeing to keep Mr. Rooster's true identity a secret. Mr. Rooster then wakes him – they're back in the studio with the band. Mikio never ascertains whether his vision was real, nor does he try to learn anything more about Mr. Rooster.
8	"Rocking Horse" "Mokuba"木馬	August 29, 2021
A salaryman named Takayuki comes home from work to his son Shōta riding an old rocking horse; it was his when he was a boy, and his sister brought it from their parents' house. Takayuki remembers he and his sister often fought over it as kids. That night, he hears the horse rocking in the living room, but the room is vacant. He turns to leave, but is startled when the horse rocks on its own. He calls his sister and asks about the horse, insisting that they shared it as kids. However, because they're 10 years apart, she would've been too old to have played with it; she suggests it was their neighbor Miki. The next morning, Takayuki is watching Shōta ride the horse, when Shōta abruptly approaches him and says that "she" said it wasn't Miki, and that he's forgotten a terrible thing he did to "her"; this unsettles Takayuki – he'd never mentioned Miki. Shōta warns him to remember "her" or else... Then starts laughing loudly. The rocking horse begins rocking, and a giggling shadow appears upon it. Who was "she"? And what did he do?
9	"Snake Celebration" "Iwai Hebi"祝蛇	September 5, 2021
A young woman named Ami and her new husband Tōru visit her in-laws for the first time for her brother-in-law Takeshi's birthday. They all sit down to a very convivial dinner, where Ami is enthusiastically embraced as family. As they settle into bed, Ami realizes that, despite it being Takeshi's birthday, he wasn't the focus of the evening, but dismisses it and falls asleep. At 2 AM, Tōru awakens Ami for the birthday party. As they proceed down the hall, she hears strange sounds coming from behind a shoji door. Tōru enters the room, and her in-laws wish Takeshi a happy birthday. She watches in horror as one of the silhouettes splits open, and a body emerges from within. Tōru's mother bids Ami to join them, and opens the shoji door. Takeshi's skin is greenish-gray, slimy and scaly; he explains that members of this family shed their skins on their birthdays. Ami stumbles in disbelief, and they quickly corner her, insisting she'll be just like them, as she's already family. She sees herself in a mirror, and her skin turns green and scaly...
10	"Boar Meat" "Inoshishi Nabe"猪鍋	September 12, 2021
A young girl named Nao and her family move to the countryside, and she has trouble fitting in. To console her, her mother invites her to plant winter peonies with her in the garden. While her mother goes for supplies, Nao is approached by another girl named Botan, whom she quickly befriends. She invites Nao to plant a peony atop a wooded hill in secret; Nao agrees, and for the next few weeks they spend all their free time playing together and nurturing the seedling. One day in the woods, the girls are accosted with rocks by Nao's bully, who is scared off by Botan's feral glare. The next day, the boy asks Nao if she's okay, which confuses her, but she dismisses it. One snowy day, they go to check on the peony, but Botan's leg gets caught in a hunter's trap. Nao goes to get help, despite Botan's desperate pleas not to leave her. At home, Nao's mother is on the phone; Botan couldn't be found, so she apologizes for the imposition. She also accepts an offer of wild boar meat to make boar hotpot (猪鍋 "Inoshishi Nabe", or ぼたん鍋 "Botan Nabe"). Later, Nao goes to see the peony on the hill, wondering where Botan could be.
11	"Dragon Palace" "Ryūgū"竜宮	September 19, 2021
This tale integrates elements from the traditional Japanese folktale Urashima Tarō. A young man named Yūsuke is night fishing on a pier with his coworker Takayuki; they aren't having much luck, so he goes to a nearby vending machine. Once there, Yūsuke is approached by an old man, who rambles about a place where anyone can do and eat anything they want. Yūsuke dismisses this as drunk nattering; he's about to excuse himself, but the old man is already gone. He returns to the pier; Takayuki has a stony expression. Just as he gets a bite, Takayuki begins telling a story – some time ago, he lost his job and was very depressed. One night when he was fishing, he was approached by a beautiful woman, who invited him to spend a year in a place of unimaginable freedom and luxury; he longs for a chance to return. As he rambles on, a woman with long dark hair rises from the water. Takayuki is elated; he begs her to take him back to that place, and asks to bring Yūsuke along. Yūsuke watches in horror as Takayuki instantly ages into an old man. Later, an elderly Yūsuke is standing at the pier, obsessively muttering to himself about how much he wants to go back to that place...
12	"Monkey Prayer" "Saru Awase"猿合わせ	September 26, 2021
Two high school best friends, Mei and Chiaki, are chatting before class when they notice their new classmate Natsuki watching them. After school, Natsuki corners Chiaki alone and tells her about a gesture called the "monkey prayer" – at funerals, it's a silent sign of rejoicing in the death of the deceased, but it can also be used to curse someone to death. That night, Chiaki has a nightmare of being at her own funeral, for which she blames and angrily confronts Natsuki the next morning. Natsuki conjectures that someone wants Chiaki dead, and recommends offering three hairs at the altar in the dream. That night, Chiaki has the same nightmare, where she begins to vanish. She burns three of her hairs at the funeral altar, then wakes up safely. She then looks out the window and sees Mei performing the monkey prayer toward her house, then fleeing after being seen. The next day, it's revealed that Mei had died in a traffic accident. At Mei's remembrance, Chiaki overhears rumors that Mei was trying to steal her boyfriend right before she died. When it's her turn to pay respects, she offers the monkey prayer.
13	"Year of the Cat" "Neko Nen"猫年	October 3, 2021
A young designer is working late with his coworker Mitsuki, who discusses the myth of the Cat in the Chinese Zodiac – the Cat killed the Rat on its way to heaven, and was removed from the zodiac as divine punishment; those born in the Year of the Cat vanish when God learns of their existence. He dismisses the idle chatter, and harshly criticizes Mitsuki's project. Later, Mitsuki tells him about a design contest with a substantial prize; the young man suggests that they both submit designs, but silently disparages Mitsuki. The next day, their supervisor informs him that, because he missed the deadline, the company will enter Mitsuki's design into the contest. He realizes Mitsuki sabotaged him by giving him the wrong deadline. The next day, on his way into work, he greets a coworker and his supervisor, who ignore him entirely. Mitsuki approaches him and asks what's wrong; he sees he's melting into water. He recalls the myth, and realizes he must have been born in the Year of the Cat; soon, all that remains of him is a puddle and one of his earrings, which Mitsuki picks up before quietly bidding him goodbye.

=== Season 10 ===
No.	Official English title Original Japanese title	Original release date
1	"A Job to Quit" "Yametai Shigoto" (辞めたい仕事)	January 9, 2022
A young man named Takashi invites his friend over one evening to consult about whether he should quit his job inspecting mannequin heads at a factory. Some heads can talk, which must be incinerated; he hears them scream in agony, and can't bear the guilt anymore. Once he finishes his story, Takashi goes on a beer run, leaving his friend alone. Suddenly, the friend hears a female voice coming from a duffle bag; it begs him to convince Takashi to keep his job, or they will be burned. He opens the bag, which is full of mannequin parts. The lights go out, and he bolts for the door, but the mannequin parts refuse to let him go until he agrees to their demands. Crazed with fear and desperation, he threatens them with a lighter... Takashi returns to find his apartment burned down. His boss finds him a new place to live, and thus he feels obligated to stay at his job. But these days, a lot more mannequin heads are talking...
2	"Ending Note" "Endingu Nōto" (エンディングノート)	January 16, 2022
Three siblings are cleaning their deceased father's apartment, which is full of trash. They resent this task, as their father was largely an absentee since their mother died. The elder brother and sister mention a few times they'd seen their father, albeit at a distance, but the younger brother dismisses these stories bitterly. They find an album of photos, including ones from the siblings' stories. The elder brother finds a notebook with entries about them, and a bucket list with one incomplete item – "Need to reap" (刈り取る[karitoru]). Thinking it means weeding the garden, they decide to sleep in the apartment, then do it in the morning. The elder brother finds a photo of their father with a very stern expression. The next morning, all three siblings are lifeless. The last item in the notebook is crossed out, and their father is grinning widely in the photo.
3	"The End of the Day" "Ichinichi no Owari" (一日の終わり)	January 23, 2022
A middle school girl named Airi walks to and from school alone each day. Each morning, she looks for a young woman in a high-rise apartment window, wishing to befriend her. Each evening, she falls asleep listening to a radio host reading letters from listeners; one such letter describes a girl who looks up at the writer's window each morning, and Airi suspects it's from the woman. The next morning, she smiles up at the woman, and that night, another letter describes the smiling girl. Airi is elated, and smiling up at the window and listening to the letters becomes a daily routine. One day, she shares her math book with a classmate named Yumie, and they become fast friends and commute buddies. Eventually, she stops looking at the window and listening to the radio. Unbeknownst to Airi, the woman has decided to meet the smiling girl. One morning, Yumie stays home, so Airi walks to school alone. As she passes the apartment building, the woman wobbles and leans into the window. Suddenly, a billboard depicting the woman falls into the street, narrowly missing Airi.
4	"Last Train" "Shūden" (終電)	January 23, 2022
A college boy named Ōmori rushes to catch the last train of the night, and barely makes it; he seems to be the only passenger, and the train's signs are turned off. He gets a text from his friend Takeshita, who wanted to talk with him earlier, looking distraught. Ōmori apologizes offhandedly for forgetting to call. His friend Kenji, with whom he had been partying, calls to ask to stay at his place. Ōmori agrees, but points out that there are no more trains. Kenji says he's on the last train, then hangs up out of courtesy to the other passengers. Ōmori is confused; he'd barely made it aboard, the station was vacant when he arrived, and his train is deserted. He eventually sees Takeshita in a car. Suddenly, another train passes by, with Kenji aboard; its signs identify it as the last train. He then remembers – the PA announced the last train's arrival time just before he boarded this one, so he isn't on the last train. Suddenly, the lights flicker, and the PA announces the last stop. The train halts and the lights go out. Takeshita appears behind him, murmuring that he's feeling much better after he "ended it", he laughs maniacally and asks ōmori "why do you think I'm on the last train?" as the train's doors open...
5	"Last Customer" "Saigo no Kyaku" (最後の客)	January 30, 2022
A young man named Takuya works the closing shift at a café; one evening, he must ask the last customer of the night, an unkempt and confused-looking old woman, to leave. The old woman mutters about having nowhere to go, before desperately begging Takuya to allow her to stay with him. He stumbles for an excuse to refuse, when his manager scolds him. When he turns back around, the old woman is gone. When he arrives at his apartment, he finds his girlfriend Marié having tea with the old woman, believing Takuya invited her. He then forcibly removes the old woman, who warns that he will end up just like her. The next morning, Takuya is awoken by Marié's scream; she says she doesn't know him and vehemently demands that he leave. Next, his manager says he never hired him. One after another, his family and friends turn him away, not knowing who he is. He is driven mad by his desperation and the sound of the old woman's laughter. His skin and hands rapidly age. Later, he is the last customer at a café, where he desperately accosts a waitress for a place to stay...
6	"Trash Drop-Off" "Shūshūsho" (収集所)	February 6, 2022
A young woman named Akane has just moved into a new neighborhood, and must manage the garbage pickup on the curb for the week. As soon as the garbage truck departs, a young man begins dropping off items. Akane tries to correct him, but the young man mentions a purple truck that visits on the 5th Wednesday of each month; you must drop off your most important possessions before the truck arrives, or else they will be taken away forever later. Suddenly, a queue appears, and the young man bids her to hurry. She is passed on the street by a purple truck, so she runs home to check her armoire and finds nothing missing. She dismisses the warning, until she sees the garbage crew forcibly confiscating an item from a woman at the curb. She realizes she hasn't heard from her boyfriend Satoru since their recent argument. She tries many times to call him, but when she finally gets through, the call is choppy. Satoru is revealed to be inside a garbage truck amidst a pile of junk and several other people, demanding an explanation and help; Akane can only laugh in despair as she realizes that Satoru was her most important possession.
7	"What Happened in the Tunnel" "Tonneru de no Dekigoto" (トンネルでの出来事)	February 13, 2022
A young couple named Sadayuki and Rina are hiking in the mountains, and decide to take a shortcut back down through a dark tunnel. Sadayuki promises to hold his girlfriend Rina's hand the entire way through. However, almost as soon as they enter, he emerges on the other side alone. Rina slowly trudges from the darkness, before suddenly screaming and flailing wildly. Later, Rina is sedated in the hospital; the doctor explains that her fear and paranoia were weakening her physically. She awakens a week later, unwilling to talk about the tunnel, and asks him to break up with her, before going back to sleep. Yet he continues visiting her in the hospital every day for the next six months. Rina reawakens and asks him why he won't leave her, and warns him that he'll regret hearing the story; he insists. Rina begins – when they entered the tunnel, they heard a terrifying moan and turned around... And her heart stops, but she continues the story. She continues talking, constantly, for the next sixty years. The man is now old, and Rina is a rotted corpse... and still talking.
8	"Wristwatch" "Udedokei" (腕時計)	February 20, 2022
Two sisters are about to part ways at the train station. The older sister named Minae notices her watch is missing, reminding the younger sister named Wakaba of an urban legend from their childhood – the clock man kidnaps you, depending on whether you give him a clock or a wristwatch; she couldn't remember which was the right answer. They part ways, and Minae remembers a watch she got for her birthday, which she was admonished to not lose, before going to bed. The next morning, she returns to work after having taken some days off; her workplace senior is missing her watch and murmurs vaguely about a wrong choice, before walking away. Sometime later, she learns that senior died during her time off, even though she had just seen her. That night, her sister appears at her window forlorn, saying she finally understands. She recounts the story of when they were accosted by the clock man as children; back then, Minae offered him her wristwatch. It was the wrong choice, so Wakaba was taken away. Surrounded by shadows, Minae blacks out. When she comes to, she finds her childhood watch on the coffee table, and ponders if she will be next...
9	"To My Future Self" "Mirai no Boku he" (未来の僕へ)	February 27, 2022
A man named Michio frustrated with his life is rummaging through junk in his apartment when he finds an old DVD; a message to himself in the future, recorded as an elementary school graduation class project. In the recording, his child self describes his dream to become a mangaka, before it freezes and distorts; his onscreen child self then reproaches his future self's failed pointless life, which he'd never said as a child, before the footage ends. On his way back from a nearby convenience store, he is accosted by screaming monochrome apparitions, who appear as his elementary school classmates and later dissolve. He later learns that his old classmates had all been disappearing since the last reunion, except for himself and Shigeru Saitō, whom he visits to try to get to the bottom of it. He believes it to be a curse for not achieving his childhood dream, and he suspects Saitō had avoided the curse by achieving his. Saitō concedes it as possible, then excuses himself to fetch drinks. The man decides to play Saitō's DVD out of curiosity; a timid child Saitō addresses the camera, reminding him that Saitō was often bullied. Suddenly, the footage distorts, and child Saitō congratulates his future self for almost achieving his dream. Michio finds a copy of their elementary school yearbook on the coffee table, with all of their classmates' photos crossed out, except his and Saitō's; child Saitō claims they all deserve death for bullying him, and declares that as his dream... and now there is only one left... An adult monochrome Saitō appears behind him, with a distorted twisted smile...
10	"The Other Building" "Bettō" (別棟)	March 6, 2022
A man named Ōta is in the hospital, and is admonished to stay in bed. Later, he roams the halls and is about to return to his room, when he finds a door in an empty wing of the hospital leading to a sky bridge to another building. He opens the door, spilling a plate of salt, and experiences a sudden malaise. Shadows appear in the windows of the other building, and a nurse warns him to get away from there, as he passes out. Ōta comes to in his room, where his wife Natsuki has come to see him, and explains why he was in the hallway; the nurse denies that the other building exists. That night, he ponders the situation as he wanders the halls again, and finds plates of salt on the floor; when he tries to step past them, he is suddenly overcome with weakness. Grotesque monsters round the corner toward him as Natsuki frantically calls to him and he loses consciousness. He awakens in his room again, insistent about the other building, but Natsuki makes him promise to not leave. That night, convinced that something is amiss, he gets out of bed, but collapses as he sets foot on the ground; salt plates are at the corners of his bed. Monsters invade his room, and he attempts to crawl away, despite Natsuki's desperate pleas for him to not go. Suddenly, he finds himself alone in a dark empty hallway. His heart monitor flatlines and Natsuki asks if he has gone to the other side.
11	"Bye-bye" "Baibai" (バイバイ)	March 13, 2022
Yumika and Kanae await their train home after a day trip to the country, and decide to visit a nearby shopping plaza to pass the time. En route, they pass by a boy waving goodbye, repeatedly saying "Bye-bye". At the plaza, everyone waves to them, repeating "Bye-bye", which begins to perturb the girls. Kanae is overcome with fatigue, so they find a café, whose customers are waving goodbye through the window. Kanae feels like she is being forcibly possessed by an unknown force, and her friend tries in vain to call for help. Suddenly, they're surrounded by a crowd constantly waving goodbye to them, and Kanae faints. Yumika confronts someone in the crowd, demanding answers, but is merely told to say goodbye. She entreats Kanae to escape, but Kanae is now fully possessed, and the entity bids Kanae goodbye... Suddenly, Yumika awakens in a hospital; a doctor explains that she and Kanae were found unconscious. She remembers the events in the plaza, but the doctor explains that the townspeople brought them to the hospital, and that she may have been hallucinating from the heat. She vehemently denies this, before the doctor begins repeating "Bye-bye"...
12	"Pinky Promise" "Yubikiri" (指切り)	March 20, 2022
A woman named Miyu notices her husband Osamu is acting strangely; he ignores her when she speaks to him, and doesn't eat. One night, before bed, she asks him about it; he has been having a recurring dream where he's married to someone else. She dismisses it, until Osamu starts sleep-talking, loses weight, and leaves the dinner table one night without eating, saying he'd already eaten "on the other side". She begs him to stop thinking about his dreams, as he resides on this side, and he agrees. That night, Osamu apologizes in his sleep, saying he needs to go back to his regular life, much to Miyu's relief. He then apologizes to Miyu for worrying her, and pinky promises to refrain from it in the future. One day, Miyu returns home to find Osamu on the couch with another woman, whom he comforts by assuring her that he made a pinky promise with the shadow of a woman that she can see at night. Miyu then begins to vanish...
13	"The Hundredth Story" "Hyakuwame" (百話目)	March 27, 2022
A group of teenagers sneaks into an abandoned school building to play a game of Hyakumonogatari Kaidankai: after lighting one hundred candles, the participants take turns telling ghost stories and extinguish one candle with each story told, expecting something extraordinary to happen after the last candle goes out. They tell ghost stories borrowed from previous Yamishibai episodes, putting out candles as they go. When one of the boys, Kōki, begins telling the 99th story, he confesses that he has played Hyakumonogatari Kaidankai before, but the 99th and 100th candles were accidentally put out at the same time and the boy who was supposed to tell the 100th story vanished. After another boy, Akito, asks what happened to the vanished boy, Kōki reveals he has just told the 99th story and invites the group to ask the vanished boy himself. He finishes his story by revealing he also heard a voice saying "See you after the next hundred" that night. The 99th candle is blown out by a mysterious figure who appears in the room, causing the group to panic. The kamishibaiya appears and says "This is the story of everyone who had a dreadful experience after a hundred stories were told..." before the 100th candle is blown out.

=== Season 11 ===
No.	Official English title Original Japanese title	Original release date
1	"Taro-chan Returns" "Taro-chan (Sai)" (タロちゃん(再))	July 10, 2023
The two children named Haruki and Junya learned that there was a temple in their neighborhood that holds a memorial service for dolls, so they went to play there. There, they found countless dolls, eerily enshrined, filled with the thoughts of their former owners. The children started playing with one of them, but...
2	"The Offering House" "Niien no Ie" (新縁の家)	July 17, 2023
A family moves to the countryside. The village provides them with a renovated old house, and the husband and daughter are overjoyed, but Misako is unable to adapt to rural life and spends her days feeling anxious.
3	"Rebirth Paper" "Saiseishi" (再生紙)	July 24, 2023
A couple loses their young child. A mysterious old man appears before them and hands them an envelope containing a mysterious recipe for recycled paper...
4	"From Back Then" "Ano Toki no" (あの時の)	July 31, 2023
Kyosuke, who got home late from work, was in a hurry. However, just when he was about to leave, a taxi was slow to stop. As Kyosuke was getting annoyed, a taxi finally stopped in front of him. The driver spoke something unexpected to him through the rearview mirror...
5	"Solo Camping" "Solo Camp" (ソロキャンプ)	August 7, 2023
Manami, a solo camping beginner, was preparing to go camping in the mountains when her high school classmate Kawaguchi showed up.
6	"White Flower" "Shiroi Hana" (白い花)	August 14, 2023
Shinichi and Kyusaku, classmates from junior high school, meet again for the first time in twenty years. You'd think they'd have a great time reminiscing about their past memories, but...
7	"That's Not Right, Dad" "Chigau yo Papa" (ちがうよパパ)	August 21, 2023
At night, Takashi tries to get Takuya to sleep. Before falling asleep, Takuya begs, "I want to hear that story", so Takashi begins telling him a ghost story that he experienced himself...
8	"Fan Activities" "Oshi Katsu" (推し活)	August 28, 2023
Mayuko is invited by Narumi to start supporting Tsukasa. She gradually starts to enjoy her "support activity", but Runa tells her the surprising true identity of her "support".
9	"Signature" "Sign" (賽印[さいん])	September 4, 2023
Ishida has just started working at a funeral parlor. One day at a funeral, he finds strange characters written on the bottom of the deceased's foot that were not there before. It closely resembles an urban legend called "Dice Mark" that is talked about among people who work in this industry...
10	"Sairen Station" "Sairen Eki" (再恋駅)	September 11, 2023
A photographer named Tomoki visits an abandoned railway station for an investigation. There is a rumor that if you leave something given to you by a former lover at the station, your lost love will be rekindled, but Tomoki ends up finding something there...
11	"Restart" "Saikidou" (再起動)	September 18, 2023
Tetsuo, a part-time worker, was killing time by playing with his smartphone. When he accessed a certain website, his smartphone started acting up...
12	"A Silver Lining" "Fukouchuu no Saiwai" (不幸中の幸い)	September 25, 2023
Riho and Marika are two college students who are on a road trip to get over a broken heart. They are caught in a sudden downpour and end up at an old inn tucked away in the mountains.
13	"Music Box" "Orgel" (オルゴール)	October 2, 2023
A lonely old man named Takagi runs an antique shop where unclaimed belongings are often brought in, but one day he notices that the same music box has been brought to the shop again...

=== Season 12 ===
No.	Official English title Original Japanese title	Original release date
1	"Just Don't Open It" "Akenakereba Daijōbu" (開けなければ大丈夫)	January 15, 2024
A man was looking for a place to move to. He was taken by a real estate agent to look at an apartment with a very low rent. The property had a mysterious door that must never be opened...
2	"Playing House" "Mamagoto" (ままごと)	January 22, 2024
After school, Takeharu visits his friend Eita's house, who is absent from elementary school. Apparently the reason he was absent is because the whole family was playing house all day. The rule in the house was that everyone had to do whatever Eita's sister wanted. When Takeharu hears this, he has mixed feelings about the rule...
3	"Blackbean" "Kuromame" (黒豆)	January 29, 2023
A week after the death of his pet cat "Kuromame", a man who was completely devastated by his pet's death, Kuromame returned as a spirit. A peaceful and mysterious life began between the spirit of Kuromame and the man. One day, the man was going on a business trip, but Kuromame suddenly became angry...
4	"Mirror" "Kagami" (鏡)	February 5, 2024
A woman lives quietly in a secluded place. There is a rule in her house that mirrors are not allowed to be brought in. One night, in front of a psychiatrist, she begins to tell the truth about that rule...
5	"The Sunken Jizo" "Shizumi Jizō" (沈み地蔵)	February 12, 2024
Tomoko was on a trip with her friend Rie to forget the pain of a broken heart. The two of them were enjoying their hobby of snorkeling when they suddenly found a Jizo statue at the bottom of the sea.
6	"Name Plate" "Hyōsatsu" (表札)	February 19, 2024
A couple moves to a new town with a fresh start. As they are moving in with great enthusiasm, they suddenly notice a brand new, unnamed nameplate on the front door. What could this "Name Plate" be? Although they feel uneasy about the unfriendly attitude of the townspeople, they start their new life...
7	"Nice" "Ii ne" (いいね)	February 26, 2024
Natsumi is worried about whether she should date a certain man. Then the ghost of her best friend Erika, who died a year ago, appears before her and leaves a note saying "I like it" before disappearing. Seeing this, Natsumi is reminded of a certain rule she made with Erika...
8	"Child Shearing" "Kosogi" (子削儀)	March 4, 2024
Tomohisa, an elementary school student, returns with his parents to the countryside where his grandparents live. However, his grandparents do not welcome Tomohisa and his parents, as they arrived without prior notice. It turns out that there is a custom in this village...
9	"No Visitors" "Menkai Shazetsu" (面会謝絶)	March 11, 2024
A local hospital. After an accident, a middle school student named Yoshinobu and his mother are hospitalized. Yoshinobu is worried about his mother, who has been refused visitation by the hospital director. Soon, the hospital is filled with a strange atmosphere with swarms of flies flying everywhere, and when he finally reunites with his mother, she is not the same as usual...
10	"Inkstone" "Suzuri" (硯)	March 18, 2024
The "Storehouse" of an old family home has been passed down for generations. When a young couple begins cleaning the storehouse, which has been abandoned for a long time, they come across various antiques that give a sense of the times. Among the antiques given as New Year's gifts, they find an antique, chipped "Inkstone."
11	"Story Time" "Yomikikase" (読み聞かせ)	March 25, 2024
A scary picture book reading session was held in a library in the middle of the night. A young man and woman visited the place out of curiosity. The rules of the session were that no one was allowed to leave in the middle of the session, and that participants had to listen to the end. When the reading began, it turned out to be a story about a rabbit and a fox who were lovers...
12	"Totem" "Katashiro" (形代)	April 1, 2024
Ever since going to an abandoned building to test her courage, high school girl named Hitomi has been having a string of misfortunes. What's more, the misfortunes are not just affecting her, but her family as well. Perhaps it's the work of spirits. When she consults her friend, she is told that there is a person at her part-time job who has psychic powers, so she gets introduced to him, but...
13	"Peace Park" "Yasuragi Kōen" (やすらぎ公園)	April 8, 2024
A parent and child who moved to a certain town spend a lovely time in a rare park with no restrictions. Two days later, when the parent and child visit the park again, a housewife from the neighborhood tells them some bad rumors about the park. The parent and child hurriedly leave the park and return home, but...

=== Season 13 ===
No.	Official English title Original Japanese title	Original release date
1	"Elevator Attendant" "Erega" (エレガ)	July 15, 2024
A little girl fantasizes about being an elevator attendant. Her mother allows her to ride the fourth elevator in a department store with an attendant only to learn that that elevator does not exist.
2	"Message Board" "Dengonban" (伝言板)	July 22, 2024
A loner has a conversation with an unknown person via a message board.
3	"Portrait" "Bromide" (ブロマイド)	July 29, 2024
A young woman fantasizes about becoming an idol. After taking pictures, and the old man who runs the photography store notices she looks like a idol, Noriko, who died 40 years before. He asks her to meet other old men still devoted to the idol. However, pictures of Noriko reveal her displeasure. Her voice demands that they deal with the imposture.
4	"Happy Girl Mushroom Tea" "Kinoko Cha" (喜乃娘茶)	August 5, 2024
A woman seeking to lose weight sees an ad for a mushroom tea. She purchase it, and an old woman with a rather "mushroomy" hair style comes to deliver the product and compliments her that the mushrooms will grow well. The product works, perhaps too well, until the woman finds herself infested with mushrooms. The old woman collects her, repeating her prediction.
5	"Moving-In Soba" "Hikkoshi Soba" (引っ越しそば)	August 12, 2024
A poor college student is awoken by a new neighbor in the wee hours. The neighbor is a young woman who apologizes for the noise then offers him "moving in soba." Starving, the man accepts it and tolerated the banging noice. A friend at college explains the pun of "soba" meaning both "near" and the delicious noodle dish. The student that night checks his leftovers, but finds long hair. He then sees that his old neighbor still lives in his apartment and there was no woman. That night, in the wee hours, he hears the noise and notes that it is in his room.
6	"Drive-In" "Drive-In" (ドライブイン)	August 19, 2024
An old and young man discuss traditional ghost stories. The old man tells of the ghost of a murdered woman begging him to kill her killer. She grabbed his hand which leaves a bruise to this day. The young man states that the ghost of a murdered man explained his killer took over his identity, running a drive in shop, and does so to this day. He also reveals the bruising on his hand. Both are delighted to meet one another as they pull knives and the scene focuses on the sign "Yami Drive In."
7	"8mm" "8mm" (8mm)	August 26, 2024
A group of friends are putting together a video for a wedding. Daiki excitedly produces an 8 mm film the grandfather of Misaki, the apparent bride, found when cleaning. Its reel is marked "No. 5." It may have footage of when Misaki was young, but it may also depict her late mother. When they view it, they see Misaki's parent's wedding, then her mother pregnant, then a crying baby Misaki. Subsequent scenes show her as a child. One viewing realizes that Misaki's mother died right after she was born. One of them notices that the woman is translucent in the footage. They decide it is ghost photography, and they should not use it for the wedding. The wedding takes place, and the one filming notices Misaki's mother behind the bride and groom through his lens. She smiles at him and bows.
8	"Laughing Bag" "Waraibukuro" (笑い袋)	September 2, 2024
Kagawa is a young woman who starts working at a nursing home. She notices an old woman, Isomura, in a wheelchair set apart from the others. The woman squeezes a joke "laughing bag" to the amusement of other old women and the shock of the girl. Kagawa confesses to her superior that she is worried about Isomura. Her superior explains that Isomura used to be lively. However, one night she noticed her wailing in fear that someone was there. Isomura was isolated so as not to scare the others. Within about a day, she was as she is now, but the superior does not know where Isomura got the joke bag she clutches. Later on her rounds, Kagawa is startled by Isomura in the hallway. As Isomura keeps squeezing the bag, her voice is heard in the laughter insisting that there is something here. The next day reveals Isomura has died. Kagawa notices the bag left on the empty wheelchair. Suddenly, it appears stained with blood. She picks it up to notice, on the floor, a severed tongue. The room door slides shut as she screams asking if someone is there. The other employees find her sitting in the wheelchair with the sound of the laughter.
9	"Peephole" "Nozokiana" (覗き穴)	September 9, 2024
In classical times a man wanders a city street when he is accosted by young girl whose face is obscured by her bangs to pay 500円 to peep through a hole in the side of a building to see a ghost. She insists that it is worth the price, there are no second looks, and once he looks he will not be able to look away. When he looks there is an impression of a face, but he complains it is too dark to see. The girl, whose face is now viewable and happy, encourages him to wait until his eyes adjust. Suddenly the face clarifies to that of a woman with a red right eye with scarring around it. He startles, tries to look, but the girl reminds him he cannot. He does anyway, but sees nothing. Her face obscured again, the girl reminds him she warned him and what happens next is his fault. Trying to relax in a hot bath, he sees the woman again with his right eye. He feels it twitch. He runs back to the girl who inform him that the ghost now haunts his eye. Another man walks the street. He sees the same invitation with the price raised to 600円. When he looks, the impression he sees is of the first man.
10	"Atonashi" "Atonashi" (址亡)	September 16, 2024
Two young men drive seeking haunted places. One notices a sign to a village recommended by his teacher. They are warmly welcomed by the villagers who are all elderly. One woman corrects the reading of the kanji for the village's name as "Atonashi." They are invited to bath in a series of three springs that will take away all aches and pains. The two do so whilst the women sing a song. The first is relaxing, the second tingles with the bubbles clinging to the flesh, and in the third the two become separated. One sees a hulking moaning figure approach as he sees he himself is dissolving in his reflection. He realizes the meaning of "atonashi" is "without a trace" (combining 址 "trace" with 亡 "death"). The villagers eagerly gather to drink from the water and are transformed into young children.
11	"String Lottery" "Itohiki Kuji" (糸引きくじ)	September 23, 2024
Two boys leave school, and one of them, Kensuke, tells the other, Hiroshi, that he heard music and suspects there is a festival. Despite Hiroshi's objections, they go and find one stall labeled "String Lottery." An old woman tells them they do not have to play, but Kensuke insists, pays 30円 and pulls a string and wins a doll that looks like him. The old woman tells him if he treats it well, it will be well for him, but if he treats it badly, it will be bad for him. Walking away, Kensuke gives the doll that looks like him to Hiroshi. At home, Hiroshi hangs it from the cord to his room's light and laughs as he pulls on the doll to turn the light on and off. Kensuke never returned home. In a storm people search for him. They see something hanging, not shown, which they describe as a doll.
12	"Classic Hotel" "Classic Hotel" (クラシックホテル)	September 30, 2024
A young man begins to work at a classical hotel. He receives a call from room 12 asking for room service consisting of three beef curries, one with extra scallions, and a pot of Darjeeling tea. He notes to himself that the hotel does not have rooms in the tens. He calls Chef Yamamoto, who knows the order. He explains that in the past a family of three would come every year and stay at a separate building that is now closed. His narration continues as the man enters the building with the order. Yamamoto continues that the parents had a child who loved curry. With this narration, the man comes to Room 12, which is barred, and something is banging on the doors as a child screams, "Mommy! Mommy! I can't breathe!" The man flees from the room as the narration continues that business was not going well. In the spring, on a chilly night like this, the family died of carbon monoxide poisoning with all of the doors and windows sealed shut. The girl died in front of the door. As the narration concludes, the ghostly face appears between the doors as the man screams. Another young man, Takeda, takes the same order. Inside the "Owner's Room Yamamoto", there is a desk draw filled with name tags. As Yamamoto stirs a pot, behind him is an old photograph of him with the family.
13	"Dreaming of That Day" "Ano Hi no Yume" (あの日の夢)	October 7, 2024
A high school student overhears girls gossiping about a boy who disappeared after the "100 Ghost Tales (百物語 ・hyakumonogatari) Ritual." He recalls the story that the boy and others gathered, but after the ninety-ninth ghost story, the last two candles were blown out, the boy, who was to give the last 100th story disappeared, and a voice claimed he would hear it. He awakes startled from a dream, but hears the doorbell ring. He looks outside and sees a shadowy boy walking away. He rushes to follow him as he hears the voice for the Narrator retell the opening. There is a gathering of children at the Narrator's performance, and the boy learns the story is about him as all turn to look at him wearing the same mask as the narrator.

=== Season 14 ===
No.	Official English title Original Japanese title	Original release date
1	"My Girlfriend" "Ore no Kanojo" (俺の彼女)	January 5, 2025
A couple starts dating. Late at night, the man awakens to a specter. His screams wakes his girlfriend. He explains that it had a mole under his eye. His girlfriend reacts to that, and he asks if she knows who it is. He narrates over a picture of a man with a mole and his girlfriend that the man dated her but died of an illness a few years ago. She, Erika, confesses that "Atasushi-san" tended to be possessive and jealous. The man narrates that that is how it began. Even in the street, the ghost of Atasushi stalks him. Unable to eat, he grows thin. Finally, he tells the ghost that he should trust him with his girlfriend, and the ghost departs. That night, she laughs that he probably got through to Atasushi. She smiles as he eats and asks about the food. He admits there is something different as his eyes close. He awakes in a foggy area, and a normal-appearing Atasushi tells him he was trying to save him. He points to a vision of Erika with another man watching him eat. He explains to the incredulous man that the other man is her next victim. Other spirits appear as the man falls to his knees. They tried to help, but the living cannot hear their voices. A specter tries to warn the new boyfriend, but Erika dismisses the sound and asks if her food is good.
2	"Hand's Hands" "Te no Te" (てのて)	January 13, 2025
A school girl, Yamane, steals things from girls that she wants. She steals lipstick, and in the staff room of Cafe Yami (矢見) she stares at it disbelieving she stole it, but her boss calls her to the register. When she tries to give change to a customer, her left hand appears to reach out for it. She makes her apologies but imagines many tiny hands growing out of her hand. At home, she unclenches her hand, and the tiny hands scream "want!" At school and work, the hands try to stretch out to steal things. At home, she notices the hands have multiplied and fearfully wonders if it was because she stole something. She begs forgiveness, promises to never steal again, then rips the hands from her hand. One of them crawls out of her home as she wonders where it is going.
3	"Dawn Girl" "Asayake no Shōjo" (朝焼けの少女)	January 20, 2025
In a park at night, a statue of a naked girl tastefully covering her breasts with her hands stands on a base with the title "Dawn Girl" (朝焼けの少女). Two men look at it and wonder how they will move it. One says a Kuramoto claimed it is hollow and should be lighter than it looks. One struggles to loosen the bolts at the base, but the other comes with a sledgehammer. He breaks the statute off at her feet. They drive away with it in the back of a pickup truck. The one with the sledgehammer wonders if it is really worth as much, to which the other sarcastically replies it would be worth more if he did not break it. They are startled by a loud noise and find the bed of their truck empty. Not seeing it in the road, they search the embankment, with the man with the sledgehammer lamenting that he has brand new work boots. The other man finds it but at first does not seem to notice her arms are no longer crossed. When he does, she shakes. She rises up reaching out to him and ask for her feet. She grabs his, but the other man arrives with his sledgehammer and smashes her face. She keeps asking for feet and pounces on the man with the sledgehammer as the other runs. Where her right eye was smashed is a red light and she moves robotically. The morning reveals the statute base with the remains of her feet. An older groundskeeper laments that she was taken. He hears a mechanical sound, then turns to see her approaching apparently wearing work boots.
4	"The Nightjar's Nest" "Yotaka no Oki Age" (夜鷹の置き揚)	January 27, 2025
Shinjiki is searching for his missing sister in the mountains. A woman, Akina, with him complains about his speed, but he hears a children's song. There is a cherry tree with children at its feet smiling around the skull of a deer. He recognizes his sister Haruka and calls to her. She acknowledges him, but the woman asks him why she is a child since she should be 16 years old now. She then asks who the other girls are. Shinjiki tries to take Haruka back, but she wants to remain with the girls. Two who are dressed in kimono suggest he play a game. If he wins, she will return with him. They all sing the song about the "Nighjar's Nest", and whom to choose. They then play a version of Rock-Scissors-Paper and they beat him. Time is running out as the Sun sets. Shinjiki wins Haruka, but Akina cannot leave. The children offer him to play for her, but embracing Haruka, he refuses. Night falls, and the girls disappear with Akina. As he promises how her mother and grandfather will react, there is a chirping sound and he is holding a skull.
5	"Paprika" "Papurika" (パプリカ)	February 3, 2025
A man buys his childhood mansion. He explains to his young daughter, Mana, that his father built it but lost it when the real estate bubble burst. His success in the IT industry allowed him to buy it back. His wife teases him that it will require renovation. Six months later, workmen announce that they found a stuffed dog in the ceiling. The man recalls his father buying him one. "Paprika" died when he seems to push him out of the way of a car. His father gave him a stuffed dog to help. His daughter declares it cute and asks if she can have it. In her arms, the stuffed toy seems to look up at him. That night he awakes to a noise from her bedroom. When he enters and turns on the light, he sees a man with a ski mask. Another man with a ski mask pounces on him and hold a knife to his throat threatening him to be quiet. The man remembers, as a boy at the shrine to his pet, wondering if Paprika could embody a stuffed toy. He begs for its help. The stuffed toy emerges angry, its head splits open, and an animal attacks both intruders who flee. The man thanks the stuffed animal, who wags his tail.
6	"Lies and Truth" "Uso to Mi" (嘘と実)	February 10, 2025
A young woman asks a young man, Ohara, for advice. Two weeks ago, when in the shower, she felt a presence. This happens again where she sees a female specter with long hair dripping water. She complained to her landlord who admitted that her apartment has a stigma. The man hands to her a packet of salt that has sigils on it. He explains that it is potent purifying salt. She hugs him in gratitude; he remains unfazed. At his locker at work, a girl tells "senior" (先輩) that he kinder than she thought. He dismisses this by confessing it was a lie. He explains that the woman made up her story. He learned this from her friends: she lies for attention. The girl compliments him for probably substituting regular salt since he has a vindictive streak. He replies that while her story was a lie, he sensed something. In her bed, looking at a picture of Ohara on her phone, she wonders if he bought her story. A specter is helpless because of the salt she left at her doorway. Ohara tells the girl that he gave the woman genuine purifying salt. As the specter disappears, the young woman decides to call him to apologize and stop lying. Ohara notices his phone rings from "Little Liar" (うそつきちゃん) as he explains he only did it because he wanted to. Note: this is a rare return of a character from a previous season.
7	"Used Car" "Chūkosha" (中古車)	February 17, 2025
A man who loves cars and his family picks up his wife and son with his new car; however, his wife sees a ghostly figure of a woman in the back seat. When she asks about the woman, she has disappeared. As they drive, the man boasts that he got a deal on the used car because there is a dent in the bumper when the specter appears again in the rear-view mirror causing his wife to scream. He does not believe her, and his son asks him to put on the radio to break the tension. The radio details a hit-and-run case where the drive drove several hundred meters with the woman he struck still on the hood of his car. During this, the husband complains that his wife just does not want him driving her. He continues to rant that he is sorry for what happened, but his son interrupts to suggest the woman seen in the seat next to him is the same on in the report. His father is shocked to learn his son saw her as well. When he asks his son if she is still there, he corrects him that she is now on the hood of the car. The man tried to use the brakes, but they do not work to his wife's horror. The GPS turns on and announces they are near their destination. It directs him to turn left, and his son, possessed, states he has to make sure his father goes through what he did. As his father fights the car and complains about the speed, his son, with a woman's voice, agrees but notes that it is the same speed with which he hit her. As husband and wife panic, the son wonders if he really thought he could get away with it by just changing cars. "You've arrived at your destination", the GPS announces.
8	"Crane" "Kurēn" (クレーン)	February 24, 2025
A man down on his luck wanders the night and finds an arcade that was not there before. He enters and finds the games "ancient", but he see a crane game that has a toy action figure. He remembers trying to win it for his son, Takashi, but he fails. His son makes him promise to win next time. The man decides he must try again, quickly goes through his 100円 coins, but he manages to get it to the chute. A few angry kicks causes it to fall in. He celebrates finally winning. He hears the voice of his son. He tries to give it to him, but his son states he died because of his father. The man protests that it was an accident. His son angrily denounces him, his father throws the figure at him, it breaks and the entire scene dissolves leaving the man begging for it to come back so he can see his son. Only the crane game remains, and the man tries to win again. Two teenagers pass him trying to play with an old, broken, and empty crane game in a dump. The man smiles as he vows he will win and Takeshi will forgive him.
9	"Desire Release" "Gankaeri" (願還り)	March 3, 2025
Naoya is a boy whose family transfers to a rural area. In school, other classmates ask him questions about living in the city. He recalls his parents promising it will only be for two years. He looks at a picture of himself with friends and wonders about them. Walking home, he is stopped by other classmates who ask if he wants to go to the chamber behind the mountain. Taken there, he is amazed by a waterfall. His classmates take him behind it to the chamber. There is a small shrine with a bag. His classmates explain they can write a wish on a stone, put it in the bag, and it will come true if it is the same wish everyone else had. One cautions that one can only write one wish and cannot tell anyone what it is. He writes that he hopes he can go back to his old school soon. At dinner, his parents try to ask if he has made friends; he reminds them that they will be there for only two years. Searching for his picture, he cannot find it. He rushes back to the chamber and finds it there. He looks in the bag, finds his wish, then finds that all of the other stones are blank. He is startled by an old hag. When he explains himself, she tells him this is a place to give up on wishes. With tears, he drops his picture. At school, he sits dejected until asked to participate in hunting for bugs after school. With a big smile, he agrees.
10	"Defense Attorney" "Bengohito" (弁護人)	March 10, 2025
An attorney is hired to defend a Yamagishi Masataka. He suggests that he change his testimony, but his client insists that it was a ghost who killed Yuka. He then angrily asks if anyone did not check Yuka's living room at midnight. The lawyer leaves knowing he will lose the case, but feeling there is more involved, decides to accede to his client's demand. He goes to the apartment, and at midnight a huge, fat, female ghost appears. He fights his fear as he realizes no one will believe him, and there is no way to make the ghost testify. He tries to take a picture on his phone, but she does not appear on the screen. However, he hears a faint, "you can let him go." He thinks this means he should drop his client, but he insist that it is his duty no matter how back his client is. The ghost disappears. However, just as everything seems normal, a ghostly hand reaches out to crush his heart. As he struggles to reach his phone, the ghost reappears to laugh at him. Note: when the attorney listens to his client, he assumes the Gendo Pose.
11	"Shared Inheritance" "Birashi" (散ら嗣)	March 17, 2025
A man returns to his village for a funeral. A woman screams as she closes the coffin over the deceased whose face appears frozen in terror. The man asks what is happening. Another explains that the deceased was dead until now. The woman demands from a Buddhist monk how many times they must exorcise him. The monk reminds that the grudge the deceased bears is too severe. She begs him to continue, whatever the cost, to at least save their son. The other man explains that the deceased was bedridden in the weeks before he died. When he visited him, he definitely seems afraid of something. The deceased claimed that every night he sees a woman he does not recognize in his dreams who tells him that if he want to blame someone, he should blame his mother. He picks at a sore on his neck which appears like a face. He concludes that there were several attempts to exorcise him before his died. An old woman gossips that it is the fault of the mother who opened a well to look for an inheritance. The monk declares that there may be a way to exorcise the grudge, and the woman asks if it will save their son. The monk begins with the doors of the coffin open to reveal the deceased's face. As the monk chants, the deceases appears to howl and claw at his coffin. Finally, the monk bows to the woman, and the deceased has a peaceful face. As the monk leaves, and the woman thanks him, he asks, without turning, if she still feels it was worth doing everything. She agrees. He replies that if she felt that way before her son came to bear this burden this may have ended differently. She dismisses this, but scratches at her neck which now has the same sore in the shape of a face. The others also scratch at their necks. The man scratches at his and point to one on the other's neck. The sore screams, "I don't want to die!"
12	"Sunk People" "Shizumuhito" (沈む人)	March 24, 2025
Kanoko, a reporter, insists on investigating disappearances, but her editor scoffs at a bog that appears out of nowhere that people sink into. She insists. She later recalls that her mentor investigated disappearances, yet himself calmly sank into a bog in a hallway before her. Since then, she has searched for this bog. She recalls various instances such as an artist who sank into a bog in his studio in front of his wife. All were anticipating something important. She realizes this after a montage that takes her into winter through summer. She calls her editor on a payphone to explain this, but he has trouble hearing her. She then sees in front of her a bog. Delighted to finally find it, she walks in.
13	"Taro-chan Returns Again" "Tarochan (sai)" (タロちゃん(再))	April 6, 2025
Aragaki has a collection of questionable objects. A friend is amazed by him, and Aragaki reveals a friend introduced him to a website that specializes in cursed objects. It needs a key, which is a USB stick that has "Yami Auction Site" (闇オークションサイト・yami ōkushon saito) written on it. The friend wants to try, and Aragaki lets him borrow it. At his home, the friend uses it to search the page and finds the doll for Taro. After some time, when he laments that money win in the end, he is disturbed by a call from Aragaki. Aragaki congratulates him on the effort. He then tells him he knows the member who bought Taro. He then tells him he can arrange it so he can get it. His friend receives his expected guest. When he checks the camera, he sees Taro-chan who claims he has come to play. He opens the door complaining Aragaki is late, but sees no one. Down the hallway, he sees a shadow and hears the voice claim he loves to ride his bike fast. Irritated, the friend follows the voice. He comes upon a wooden tag. He then turns to see the shadow cast from inside his apartment with the voice telling him he knows how to make it safe. Still believing Aragaki is manipulating the doll, he enters his apartment and decides to humor the voice that complains, "it hurt!" He is stunned to see in his bath Aragaki dressed as a doll in the tub with a phone playing a voice. He then turns to see the actual doll explain that when he rode his bike really fast, he got into a fight with a car coming around the corner. As the doll approaches, the friend begs him to stop and promises to exorcise him. "You talk too much", the doll cautions him. Note: Taro-chan previously appeared Episode 1 of Season 2 and 11.

=== Season 15 ===
No.	Official English title Original Japanese title	Original release date
1	"Lottery" "Fukubiki" (福引)	July 14, 2025
Megumi visits the shopping district and is lucky enough to win a prize in a lottery. When she wins third prize, a mysterious old woman appears before her...
2	"Inheritance" "Noko mugo" (遺惨)	July 21, 2025
The head of the wealthy Yomotsu Tachibana family suddenly passes away. However, none of the three brothers who are entitled to inherit the huge fortune want to take it. Lawyer Tateno finds the brothers' attitude strange, but he goes ahead with the procedures for the inheritance...
3	"Clang Clang Clang" "Kankankan" (カンカンカン)	July 28, 2025
Takiko is an elementary school girl who loves to play by making all kinds of noises. One day, she finds an old nail in the sandbox, and there's a sound that has been strangely haunting her...
4	"Stains" "Zan kitana" (残汚)	August 4, 2025
Late at night at the laundromat, Fuuka arrives after getting her clothes dirty during a job. However, even after washing, the stains don't come off. While Fuuka is wondering why this is happening, she receives a phone call from an old man she doesn't know...
5	"Nokotta, Nokotta" "Nokotta, nokotta" (ノコッタ、ノコッタ)	August 11, 2025
One hot summer day, a middle-aged man named Kameda gets lost. One day, he is suddenly approached by a boy who claims to be a fan of sumo wrestling. Kameda brushes him off at first, but the boy's persistent pestering gradually makes him feel uneasy...
6	"Butterfly" "Chōcho" (ちょうちょ)	August 18, 2025
Suzue, who lost her mother at an early age, treasured a red umbrella embroidered with a butterfly as her only memento. However, when her granddaughter Hinata lost the umbrella while out, Suzue was devastated.
7	"Duty" "Tōban" (当番)	August 25, 2025
Kazuko has moved into a public housing complex due to her husband's work. Apparently, the rule at this complex is that the person on duty must visit each household and collect management fees. Kazuko is called in by a local government official in the middle of the night and unilaterally selected to be on duty, so she has no choice but to visit each household...
8	"Golden Years" "Yosei" (余生)	September 1, 2025
An elderly couple has lost their purpose in life. They spend their remaining days listlessly. At 4 a.m. after a sleepless night, the TV screen they were watching suddenly becomes distorted and a certain program appears on the screen. It appears to be a shopping channel...
9	"Lingering Snow" "Nokori yuki" (残り雪)	September 8, 2025
Nobumi returns to her hometown for the first time in a year. She meets Yuki, a young girl who has been waiting for her, and they go out to play in the snow as they do every year. However, when the sun sets, Yuki says she won't be going home.
10	"Burden Giving" "O ni nokoshi" (御荷残し)	September 15, 2025
Ippei and Kaoru have chosen a rural village as their first home after getting married. Coincidentally, a festival called "Okadashi" is being held on the day they move in, and the village chief encourages them to participate. This festival, which has been passed down in the village for generations, is said to be an essential event for the residents to live in peace, but...
11	"Mourning Scent" "Ki-shū" (忌臭)	September 22, 2025
Tomoyuki lets his college friend Kosuke stay at his house when he suddenly shows up for a visit. However, the next morning, Kosuke has disappeared without a word. All that remains in the room is an unpleasant, pungent smell. Could this smell be the smell Kosuke left behind?
12	"Summer Grievings" "Zansho mimai" (残暑見舞い)	September 29, 2025
A postcard arrives at Tomoharu's house. The sender is from a patient who shared a room with Tomoharu when he was hospitalized. Tomoharu feels nostalgic, but from that night onwards, he begins to hear eerie voices in his head... Note: Zanbai previously appeared Episode 2.
13	"Memories" "Omoide" (思い出)	October 6, 2025
Shunsuke returns to his hometown with his wife Yoko for the first time in a long while. As they tour places associated with his childhood memories, Shunsuke talks passionately about them, but that night, Yoko hears a strange story from Shunsuke's mother...

=== Season 16 ===
No.	Official English title Original Japanese title	Original release date
1	"Final Episode" "Saishuukai" (最終回)	January 12, 2026
A rumor has circulated that the final episode of a children's program broadcast 40 years ago was completely different in a specific region. After years of investigation, self-proclaimed urban legend researcher Kotaro Higashimura identifies the village that is said to be the source of the rumor...
2	"Research Results" "Kenkyuu Kekka" (研究結果)	January 19, 2026
Naoki's homeroom teacher, Mio, finds the results of his summer vacation project puzzling. She visits Naoki's home and asks his parents about him, but they say there's nothing suspicious about him. However, the parents' behavior gradually becomes stranger...
3	"A Peaceful Village" "Odayaka na Mura" (穏やかな村)	January 26, 2026
A man moves to a rural village to hide his whereabouts. The villagers are all kind, giving him a nice house and delicious food, making it a paradise for him. But one night, he hears that a villager has died...
4	"Following" "Tsuite Iku" (ついていく)	February 2, 2026
Yuri, who runs a clothing repair shop, is approached by a customer, Ryuuta, who wants her to remake a kimono into a necktie. As Yuri is about to start cutting, she notices something sewn into the back of the kimono...
5	"Gathering" "Noroi yui" (呪結)	February 9, 2026
Shibasaki, a man who works at a real estate agency, is asked by his boss to show a young psychic, Ohara, around a problematic property under his management. Ohara was supposed to perform a psychic reading and exorcism at the property, but...
6	"Password" "Aikotoba" (合言葉)	February 16, 2026
Four elementary school students are walking home from school, happily following their usual route when they notice an old, unfamiliar Western-style house. Intrigued, they decide to explore inside, but Ryosuke is terrified by something eerie and unfamiliar...
7	"Round and Around" "Guruguru" (ぐるぐる)	February 23, 2026
Yuichiro is watching over his wife, Asako, who is on maternity leave and about to give birth. Amidst their peaceful days, Asako mentions the word "guruguru", but Yuichiro has never heard it before...
8	"Frozen Over" "Touketsu" (凍結)	March 2, 2026
Shuugo lost his brother in a snowstorm. He uses a photograph his brother left behind as evidence to argue that his brother's death was not an accident but murder, but no one will listen to him. Then, a woman appears before the devastated Shuugo. She is the spitting image of the woman in the photograph...
9	"Sleeper Train" "Shindai Ressha" (寝台列車)	March 9, 2026
Sayuri and Miwa set off on a trip together. They were both incredibly excited about their first time on a sleeper train, but the conductor who came to check their tickets said something strange. He insisted it was "for the safety of the passengers", but...
10	"Musubime-sama" "Musubime-sama" (ムスビメサマ)	March 16, 2026
Ami and Toma are a newly dating couple. During a late-night drive, the conversation turns to the urban legend of "Musubimesama", and Ami begins to recount a story her friend Yukari had...
11	"Dream Connection" "Yume Musubi" (夢結び)	March 23, 2026
Yukiya, a high school student living in a dormitory, has recently been troubled by strange dreams. When he tells his roommate, Kota, about them, Kota invites him to try a traditional charm from his hometown called "Dream Tying"...
12	"Restoration" "Yui Modoshi" (結戻し)	March 30, 2026
A mysterious phone call comes to a man. A stranger, a woman, simply says, "I need you to hold onto 'something' for me," completely disregarding the man's convenience and leaving the "something" behind. It seems to be a cursed item, and no matter how much he tries to get rid of it, it keeps appearing before him... Note: Taro-chan previously appeared Episode 1 of Season 2 and 11, Episode 13 of Season 14.
13	"Conclusion" "Ketsumatsu" (結末)	April 6, 2026
Tonight was the final episode of Nobuhito's favorite anime. He was eagerly awaiting the conclusion, but the world was abuzz with talk of "the end of the world." Today was the day a certain prophet had predicted would come to an end...
