= Kamijima Station =

Railway station in Hamamatsu, Japan

Kamijima Station 上島駅
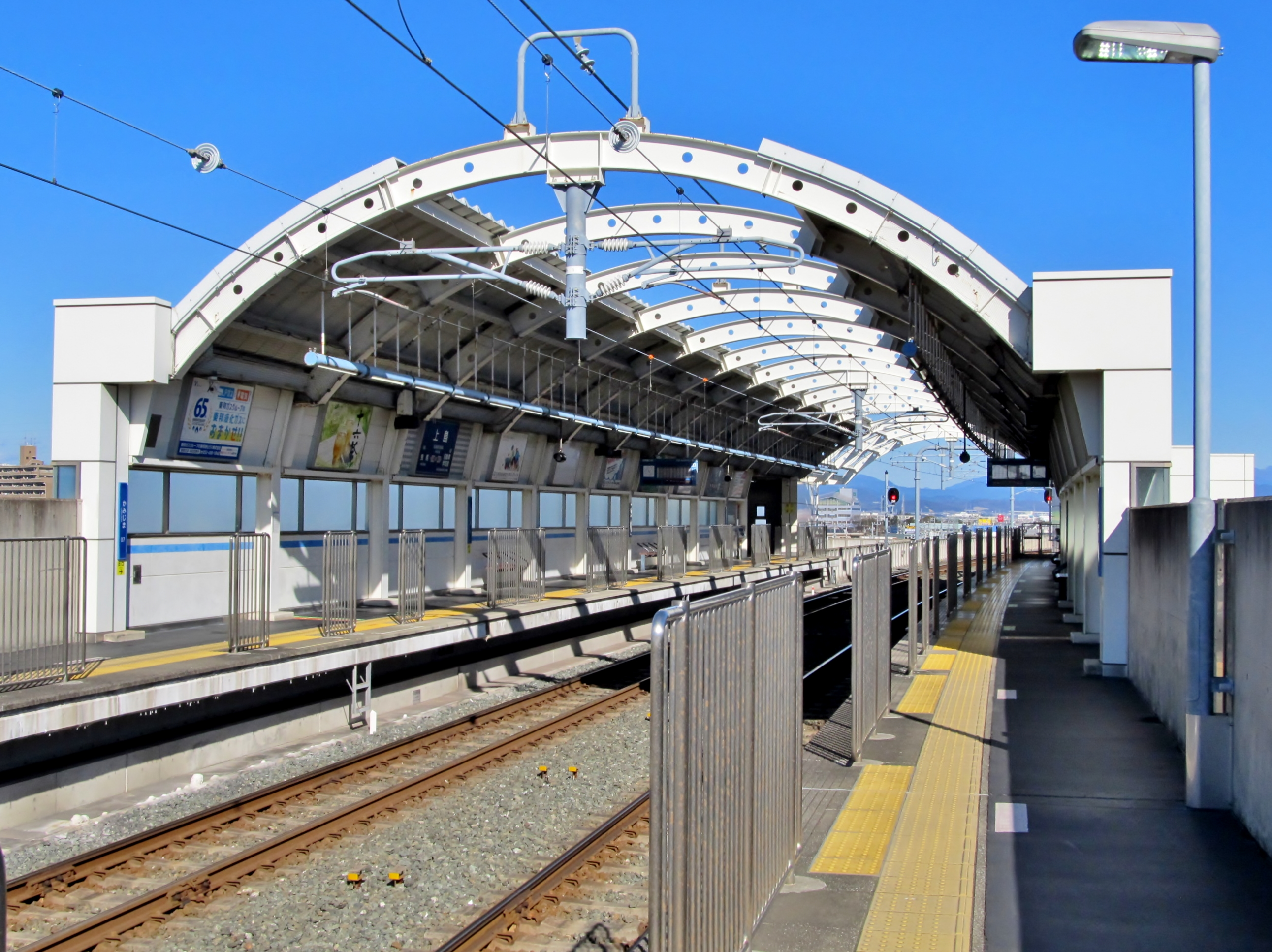
- Kamijima Station in 2 January 2025

General information
- Location: Kamijima 3-40-1, Chūō-ku, Hamamatsu-shi, Shizuoka-ken 433-8122; Japan
- Coordinates: 34°44′28.66″N 137°44′43.45″E
- Operator: Enshū Railway
- Line: ■ Enshū Railway Line
- Distance: 4.5km from Shin-Hamamatsu
- Platforms: 2 side platforms

Other information
- Status: Staffed
- Station code: 07

History
- Opened: December 6, 1909
- Former names: Enshū-Kamijima (1926 - 2012)

Passengers
- FY2017: 1,726 (daily)
Location
- Location within Shizuoka Prefecture Location within Japan

Kamijima Station (上島駅, Kamijima-eki) is a railway station in Chūō-ku, Hamamatsu, Shizuoka Prefecture, Japan, operated by the private railway company, Enshū Railway.

== Lines ==
Kamijima Station is a station on the Enshū Railway Line and is 4.5 kilometers from the starting point of the line at Shin-Hamamatsu Station.

== Station layout ==
The station is an elevated station with dual opposed side platforms. It is staffed during daylight hours. The station building has automated ticket machines, and automated turnstiles which accept the NicePass smart card, as well as ET Card, a magnetic card ticketing system.

=== Platforms ===
1	■ Enshū Railway Line	for Hamakita and Nishi-Kajima
2	■ Enshū Railway Line	for Shin-Hamamatsu

== Adjacent stations ==
«	Service	»
Enshū Railway
Enshū Railway Line
Hikuma	-	Jidōshagakkō Mae

== Station History ==
Kamijima Station was established on December 6, 1909 with a single island platform . It was renamed as Enshū-Kamijima Station (遠州上島駅, Enshū-Kamijima-eki) in 1926, reverting to its original name in 2012. Freight operations began in 1956 with the completion of a large oil terminal nearby; freight operations were discontinued in 1975. The tracks were elevated and reconfigured to dual side platforms from 2008–2012.

== Passenger statistics ==
In fiscal 2017, the station was used by an average of 1,726 passengers daily (boarding passengers only).

== Surrounding area ==
- Hamamatsu Baseball Stadium

== See also ==
- List of railway stations in Japan
