= Enshū-Kobayashi Station =

Railway station in Hamamatsu, Japan

Enshū-Kobayashi Station 遠州小林駅
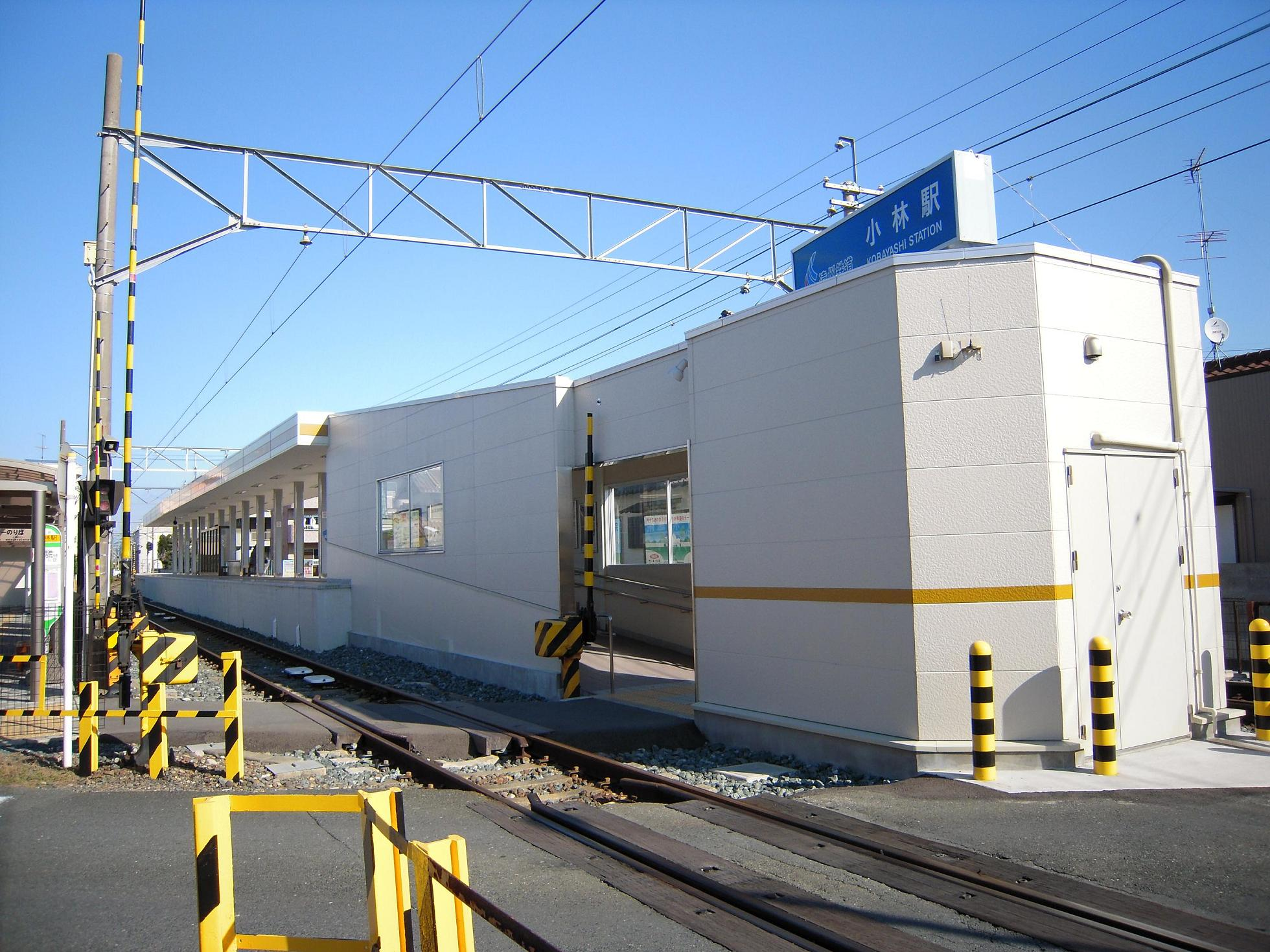
- Enshū-Kobayashi Station

General information
- Location: Honzawai 871-7, Hamana-ku, Hamamatsu-shi, Shizuoka-ken 434-0014; Japan
- Coordinates: 34°48′30.25″N 137°47′43.75″E
- Operator: Enshū Railway
- Line: ■ Enshū Railway Line
- Distance: 13.3 km from Shin-Hamamatsu
- Platforms: 1 island platform

Other information
- Status: Unstaffed
- Station code: 15

History
- Opened: December 6, 1909
- Former names: Shinbara (to 1923)

Passengers
- FY2017: 1,335 (daily)
Location
- Location within Shizuoka Prefecture Location within Japan

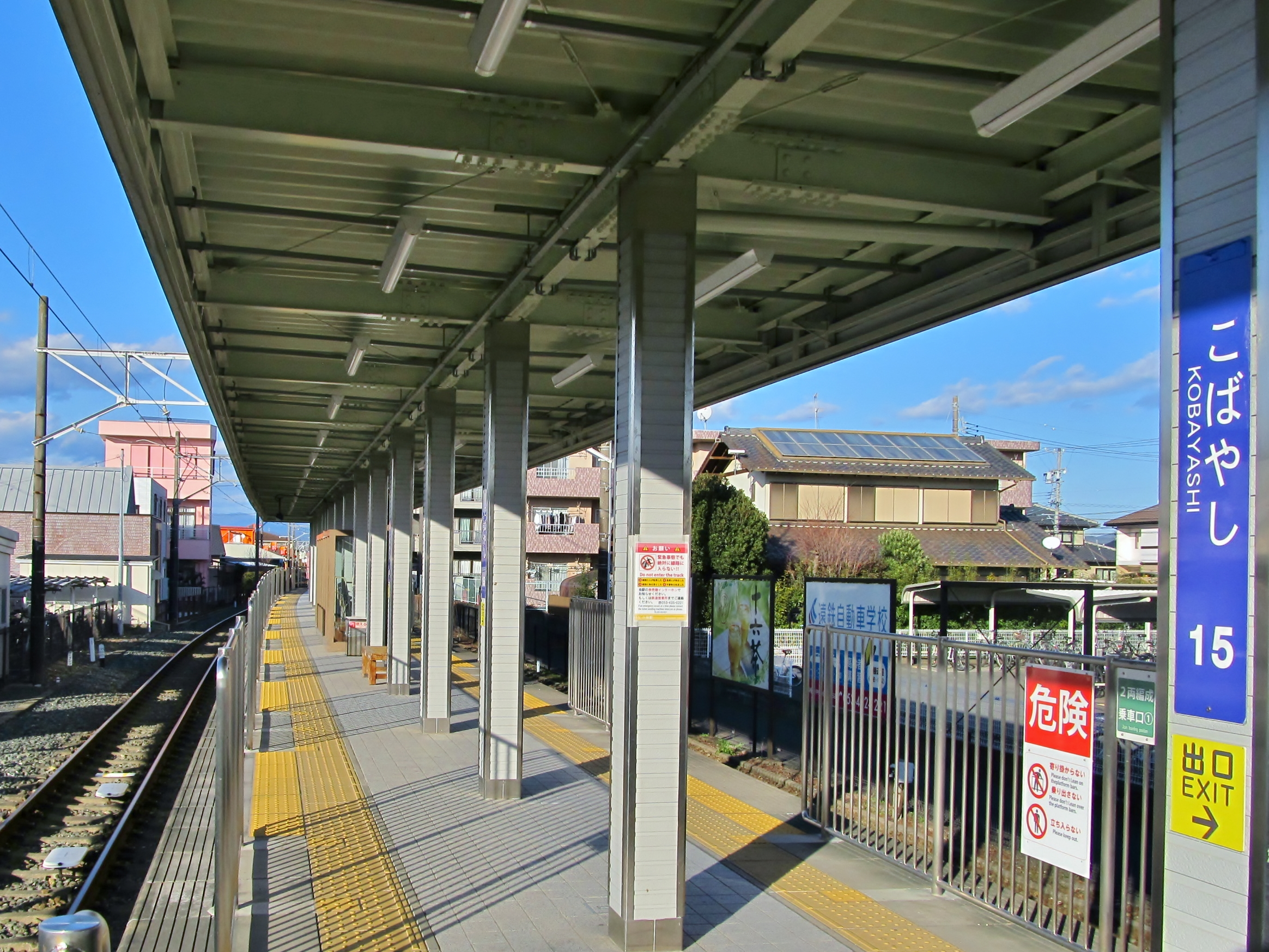
Platform

Enshū-Kobayashi Station (遠州小林駅, Enshū-Kobayashi-eki) is a railway station in Hamana-ku, Hamamatsu, Shizuoka Prefecture, Japan, operated by the private railway company, Enshū Railway.

== Lines ==
Enshū-Kobayashi Station is a station on the Enshū Railway Line and is 13.3 kilometers from the starting point of the line at Shin-Hamamatsu Station.

== Station layout ==
The station has a single unnumbered island platform, with the station building built onto one end of the platform. The station building has automated ticket machines, and automated turnstiles which accept the NicePass smart card, as well as ET Card, a magnetic card ticketing system. The station is unattended.

=== Platforms ===
east	■ Enshū Railway Line	for Shin-Hamamatsu
west	■ Enshū Railway Line	for Nishi-Kajima

== Adjacent stations ==
«	Service	»
Enshū Railway
Enshū Railway Line
Misono Chūōkōen	-	Enshū-Shibamoto

== Station History ==
Enshū-Kobayashi Station was established on December 6, 1909 as Shinbara Station (新原駅, Shinbara-eki). It was given its present name in April 1923. The station has been unstaffed since 1974. The station building was rebuilt in 1982.

== Passenger statistics ==
In fiscal 2017, the station was used by an average of 1,335 passengers daily (boarding passengers only).

== Surrounding area ==
- Hamamatsu Red Cross Hospital
- Hamana High School
- Kitahamakita Elementary School

== See also ==
- List of railway stations in Japan
