= Enshūbyōin Station =

Railway station in Hamamatsu, Japan

Enshūbyōin Station 遠州病院駅
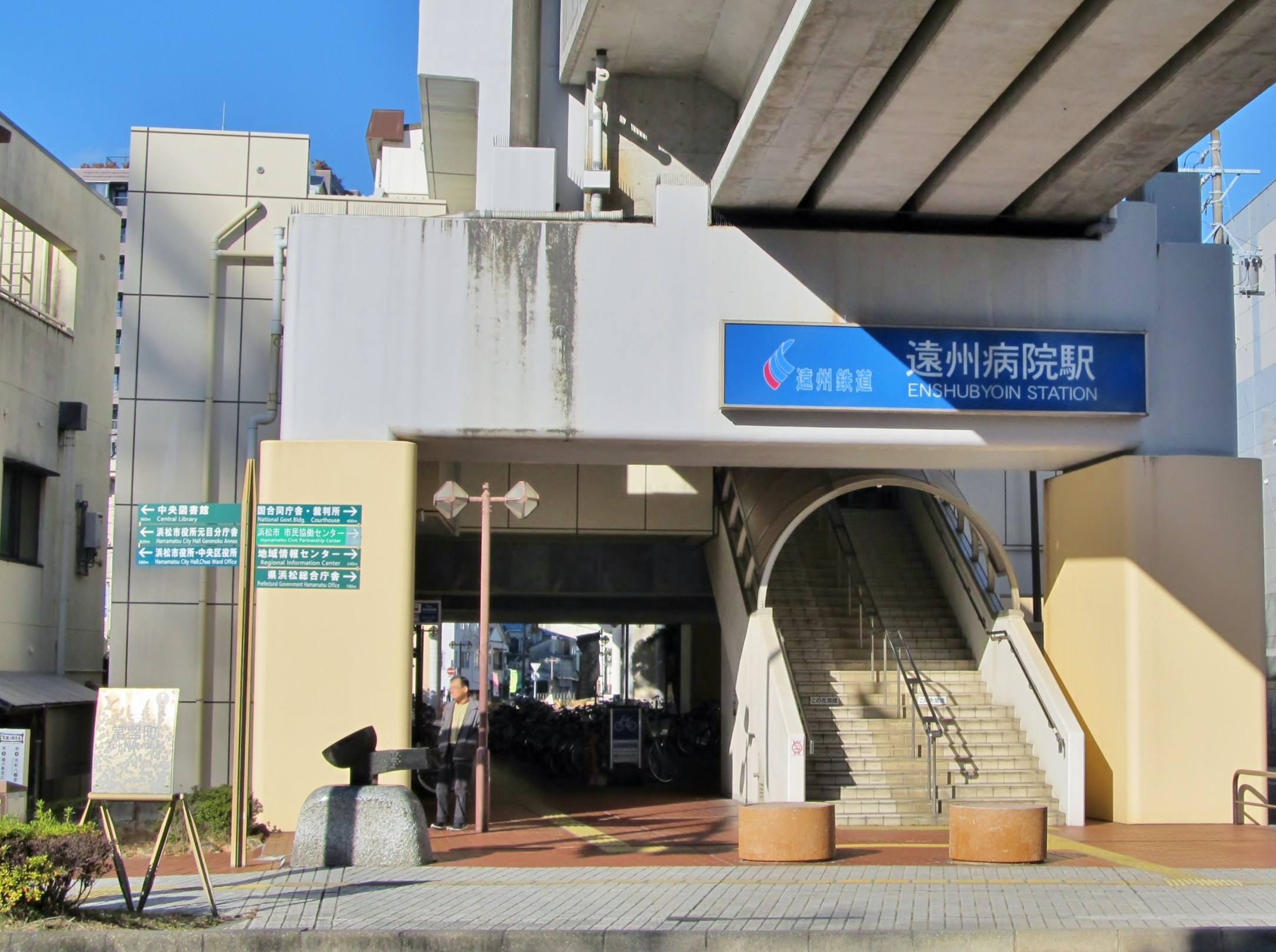
- Enshūbyōin Station in 2 January 2025

General information
- Location: Hayauma-chō 2-21, Chūō-ku, Hamamatsu-shi, Shizuoka-ken 430-0916; Japan
- Coordinates: 34°42′38.28″N 137°43′59.89″E
- Operator: Enshū Railway
- Line: ■ Enshū Railway Line
- Distance: 0.8 km from Shin-Hamamatsu
- Platforms: 2 side platforms

Other information
- Status: Staffed
- Station code: 03

History
- Opened: June 1, 1958

Passengers
- FY2017: 995 (daily)
Location
- Location within Shizuoka Prefecture Location within Japan

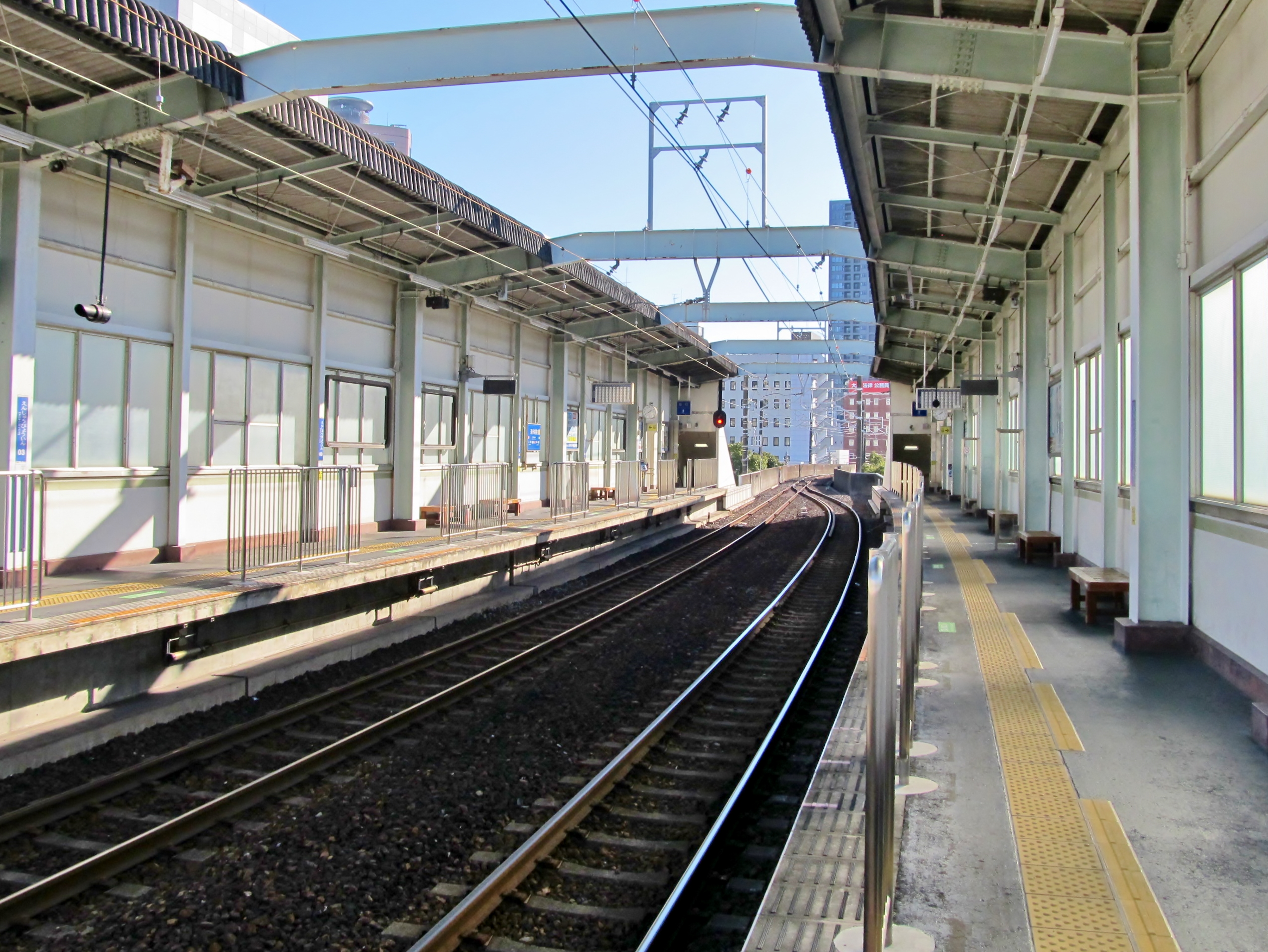
Platform

Enshūbyōin Station (遠州病院駅, Enshūbyōin-eki) is a railway station in Chūō-ku, Hamamatsu, Shizuoka Prefecture, Japan, operated by the private railway company, Enshū Railway.

== Lines ==
Enshūbyōin Station is a station on the Enshū Railway Line and is 0.8 kilometers from the starting point of the line at Shin-Hamamatsu Station.

== Station layout ==
The station has dual opposed elevated side platforms, with the station building located underneath. It is staffed during daylight hours. The station building has automated ticket machines, and automated turnstiles which accept the NicePass smart card, as well as ET Card, a magnetic card ticketing system.

=== Platforms ===
1	■ Enshū Railway Line	for Shin-Hamamatsu
2	■ Enshū Railway Line	for Hamakita and Nishi-Kajima

== Adjacent stations ==
«	Service	»
Enshū Railway
Enshū Railway Line
Daiichidōri	-	Hachiman

== Station History ==
Enshūbyōin Station was established on June 1, 1958 as Entetsu Hamamatsu Station (遠鉄浜松駅, Entetsu Hamamatsu-eki), the original terminal station for the Enshū Railway Line. The current Shin-Hamamatsu Station is located on what was formerly the rail yard. The station was renamed as Enshū-Byōin-mae Station (遠州病院前駅, Enshū-Byōin-mae-eki) in 1985 and renamed to its present name in 2007. In April 2007, the Enshū Hospital, after which the station was named, was relocated; however, the station name was not changed.

== Passenger statistics ==
In fiscal 2017, the station was used by an average of 995 passengers daily (boarding passengers only).

== Surrounding area ==
- Shizuoka University of Art and Culture

== See also ==
- List of railway stations in Japan
