= Jidōshagakkō Mae Station =

Railway station in Hamamatsu, Japan

Jidōshagakkō Mae Station 自動車学校前駅
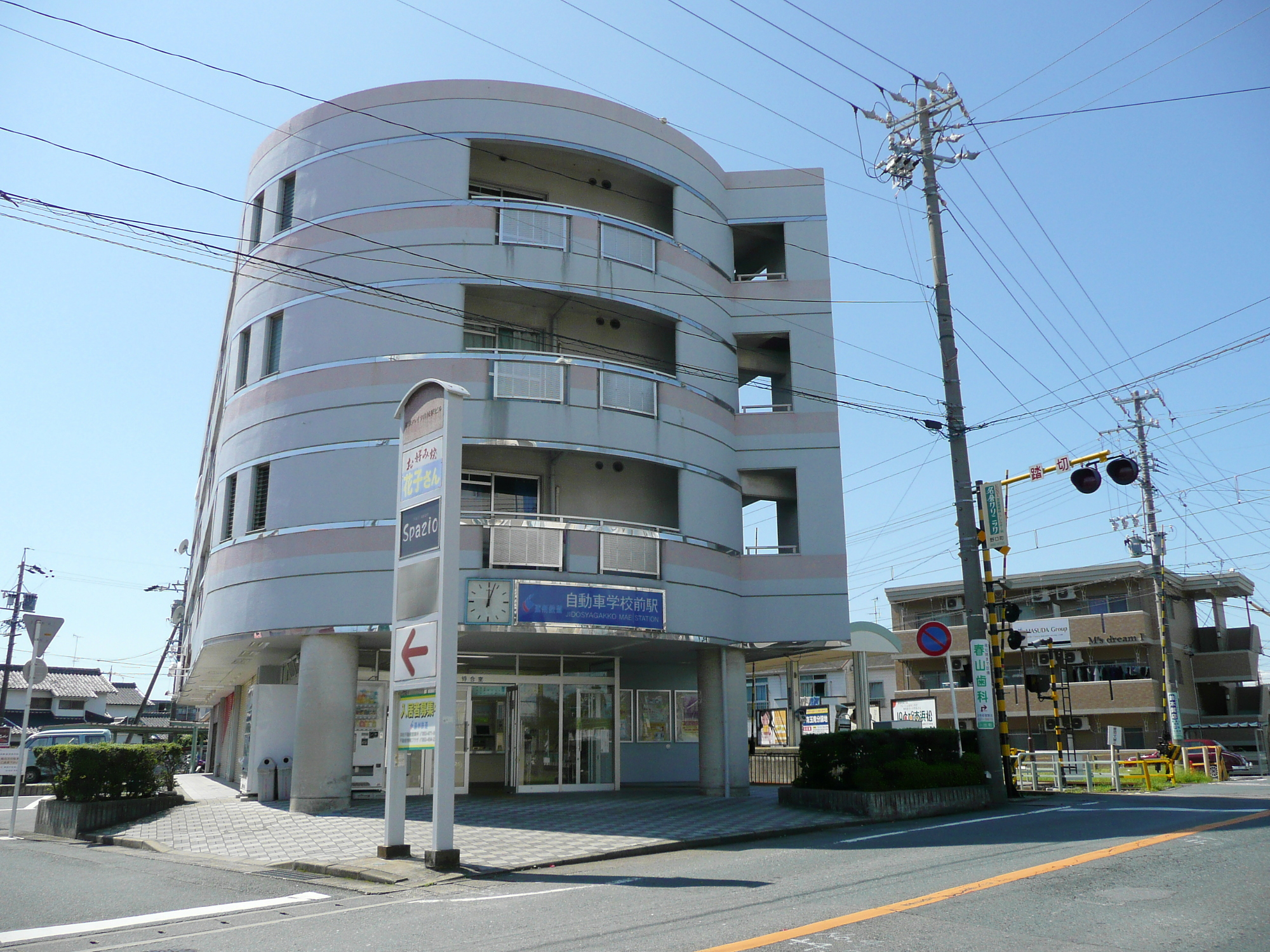
- Jidōshagakkō Mae Station

General information
- Location: Aritama-minami-cho 1739, Chūō-ku, Hamamatsu-shi, Shizuoka-ken 431-3122; Japan
- Coordinates: 34°44′51.54″N 137°45′6.47″E
- Line: ■ Enshū Railway Line
- Distance: 5.3 km from Shin-Hamamatsu
- Platforms: 2 side platforms

Other information
- Status: Unstaffed
- Station code: 08

History
- Opened: December 6, 1909
- Former names: Ichiba (to 1926), Enshū-Ichiba (to 1966)

Passengers
- FY2017: 971 (daily)
Location
- Location within Shizuoka Prefecture Location within Japan

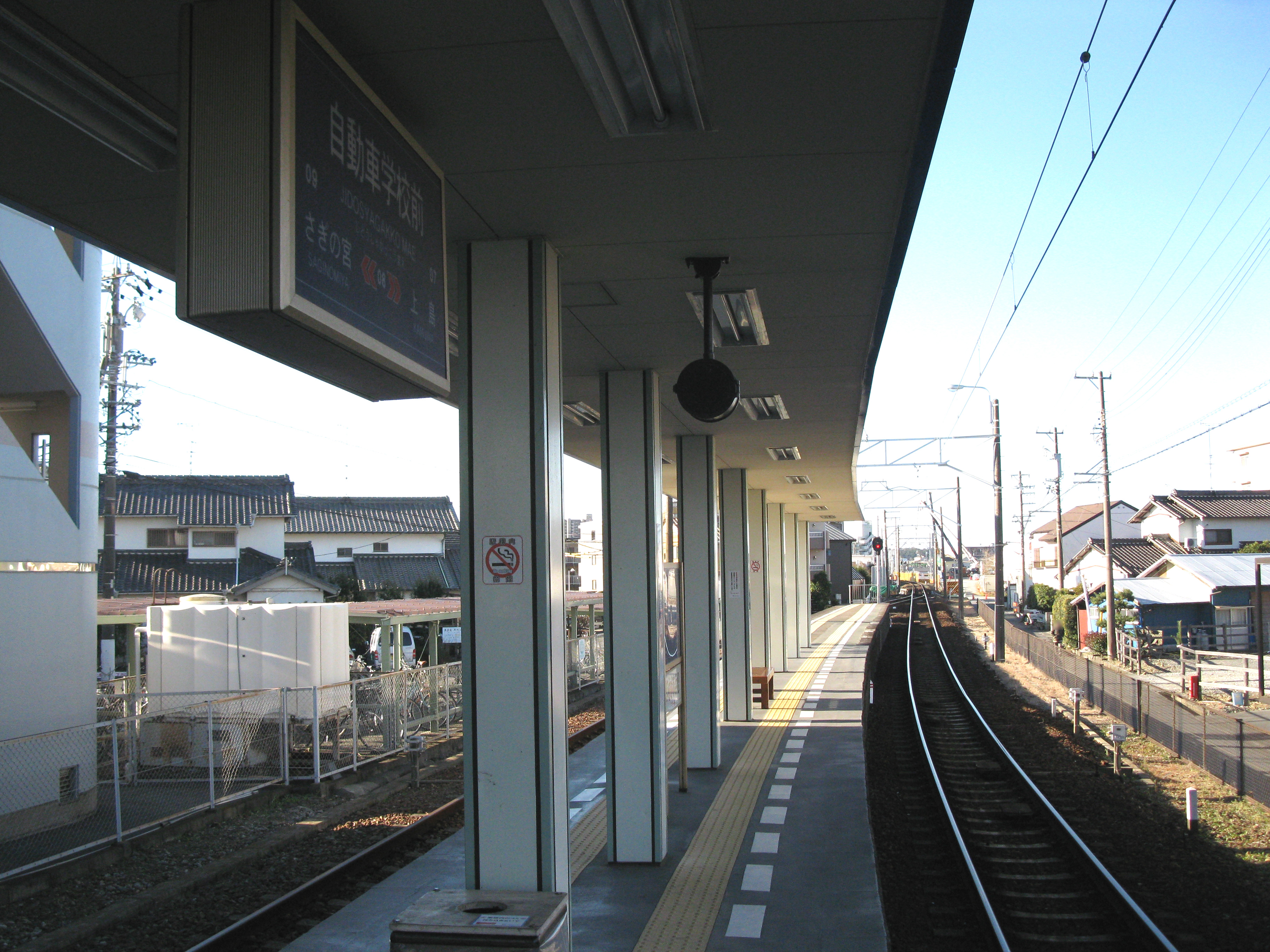
Platform

Jidōshagakkō Mae Station (自動車学校前駅, Jidōshagakkō Mae-eki) is a railway station in Chūō-ku, Hamamatsu, Shizuoka Prefecture, Japan, operated by the private railway company, Enshū Railway.

== Lines ==
Jidōshagakkō Mae Station is a station on the Enshū Railway Line and is 5.3 kilometers from the starting point of the line at Shin-Hamamatsu Station.

== Station layout ==
The station is an unattended station with a single ground-level island platform. The station building is a four-story building, with the upper floors as private condominiums. The station building has automated ticket machines, and automated turnstiles which accept the NicePass smart card, as well as ET Card, a magnetic card ticketing system.

=== Platforms ===
| 1 | ■ Enshū Railway Line | for Hamakita and Nishi-Kajima |
| 2 | ■ Enshū Railway Line | for Shin-Hamamatsu |

== Adjacent stations ==
| « | Service | » |
Enshū Railway
Enshū Railway Line
| Kamijima | - | Saginomiya |

== Station History ==
Jidōshagakkō Mae Station was established on December 6, 1909 as Ichiba Station (市場駅, Ichiba-eki). It was renamed to Enshū-Ichiba Station (遠州市場駅, Enshū-Ichiba-eki) in 1926. The station gained its present name with the opening of a large driver's training school nearby in 1966. The station has been unstaffed since September 1974.

== Passenger statistics ==
In fiscal 2017, the station was used by an average of 971 passengers daily (boarding passengers only).

== Surrounding area ==
- Entetsu Driving School

== See also ==
- List of railway stations in Japan
