= Hachiman Station =

Railway station in Hamamatsu, Japan

Hachiman Station 八幡駅
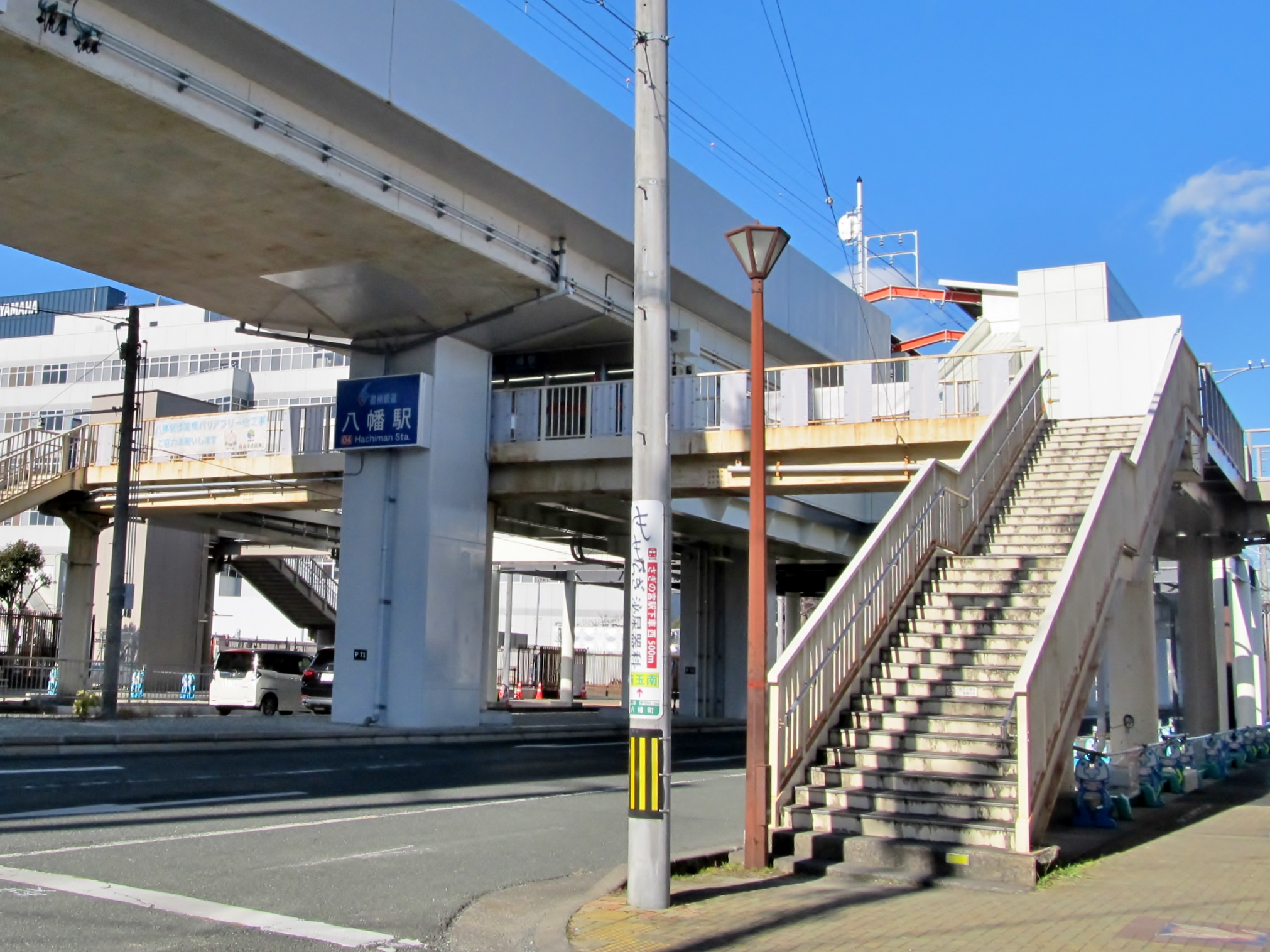
- Hachiman Station

General information
- Location: Hachiman-cho 139-4, Chūō-ku, Hamamatsu-shi, Shizuoka-ken 430-0918; Japan
- Coordinates: 34°43′1.20″N 137°44′9.32″E
- Operator: Enshū Railway
- Line: ■ Enshū Railway Line
- Distance: 1.6 km from Shin-Hamamatsu
- Platforms: 2 side platforms

Other information
- Status: Staffed
- Station code: 04

History
- Opened: April 1, 1930
- Former names: Mayuichibamae (to 1915), Enshū Hachiman (to 1951)

Passengers
- FY2017: 1,058 (daily)
Location
- Location within Shizuoka Prefecture Location within Japan

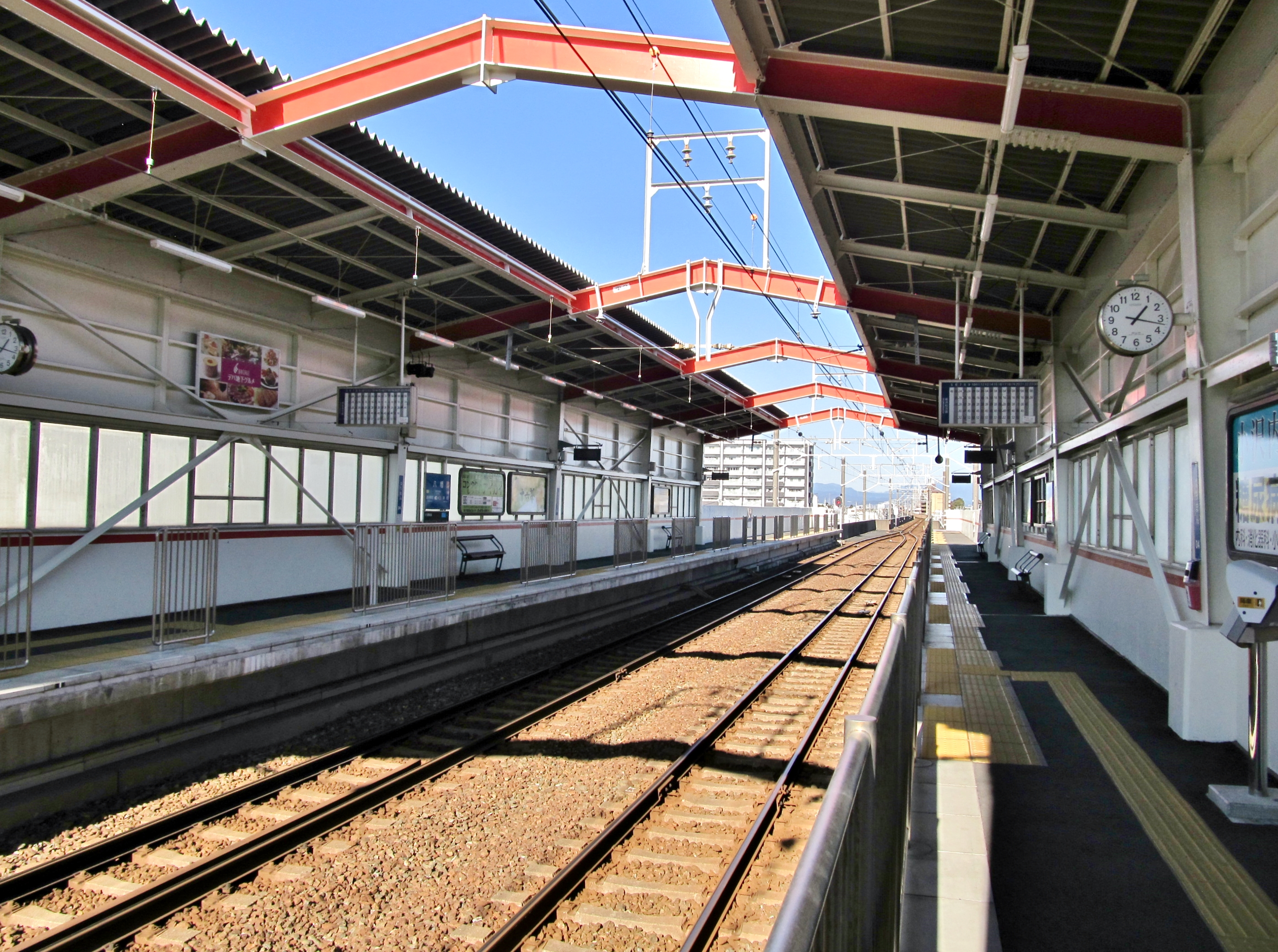
Platform

Hachiman Station (八幡駅, Hachiman-eki) is a railway station in Chūō-ku, Hamamatsu, Shizuoka Prefecture, Japan, operated by the private railway company, Enshū Railway.

== Lines ==
Hachiman Station is a station on the Enshū Railway Line and is 1.6 kilometers from the starting point of the line at Shin-Hamamatsu Station.

== Station layout ==
The station is an elevated station with dual opposed side platforms. It is staffed during daylight hours. The station building has automated ticket machines, and automated turnstiles which accept the NicePass smart card, as well as ET Card, a magnetic card ticketing system.

=== Platforms ===
1	■ Enshū Railway Line	for Shin-Hamamatsu
2	■ Enshū Railway Line	for Hamakita and Nishi-Kajima

== Adjacent stations ==
«	Service	»
Enshū Railway
Enshū Railway Line
Enshūbyōin	-	Sukenobu

== Station history ==
Hachiman Station was established on April 1, 1930 as Mayuichibamae Station (繭市場前駅) and was renamed Enshū Hachiman Station (遠州八幡駅) in 1951. The station was renamed to its present name in 1985.

== Passenger statistics ==
In fiscal 2017, the station was used by an average of 1,058 passengers daily (boarding passengers only).

== Surrounding area ==
- Yamaha head office
- Hashima Junior High School
- Hamamatsu Hachiman-gu

== See also ==
- List of railway stations in Japan
