= Enshū-Shibamoto Station =

Railway station in Hamamatsu, Japan

Enshū-Shibamoto Station 遠州芝本駅
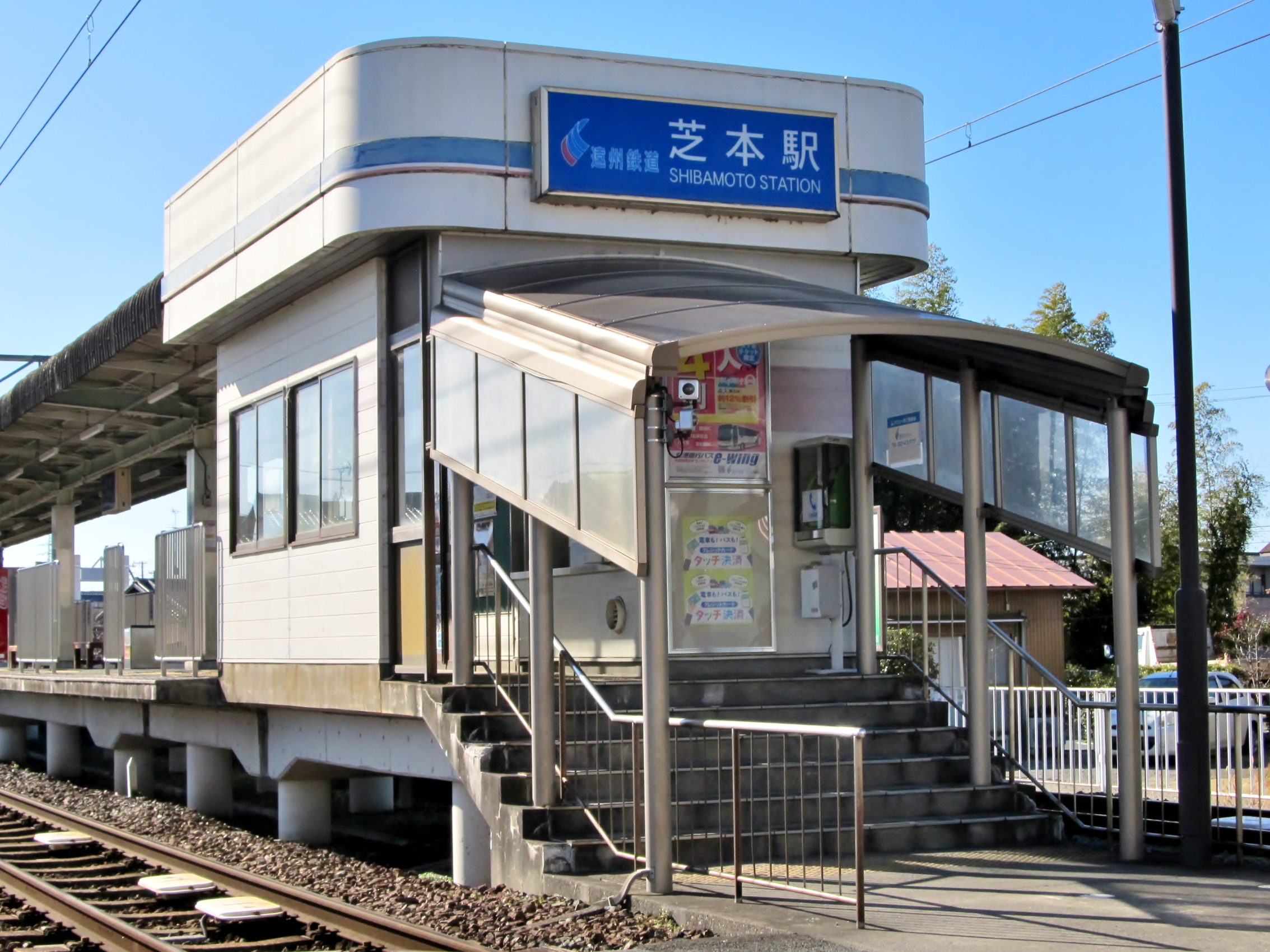
- Enshū-Shibamoto Station in 2 January 2025

General information
- Location: Oro 3061-2, Hamana-ku, Hamamatsu-shi, Shizuoka-ken 434-0015; Japan
- Coordinates: 34°49′24.75″N 137°47′54.95″E
- Operator: Enshū Railway
- Line: ■ Enshū Railway Line
- Distance: 11.2 km from Shin-Hamamatsu
- Platforms: 1 island platform

Other information
- Status: Staffed
- Station code: 16

History
- Opened: December 6, 1909
- Former names: Shibamoto (to 1923)

Passengers
- FY2017: 658 (daily)
Location
- Location within Shizuoka Prefecture Location within Japan

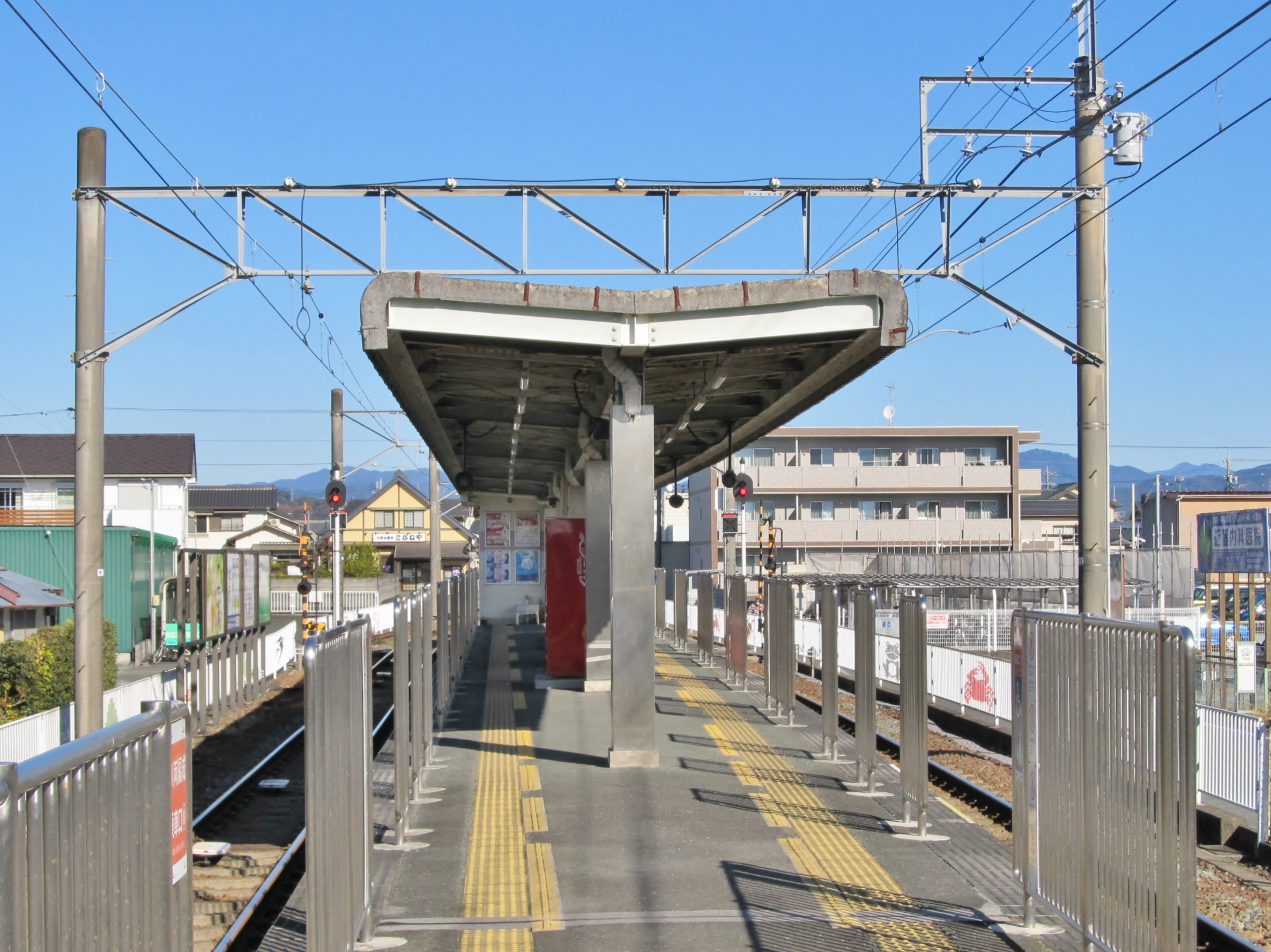
Platform

Enshū-Shibamoto Station (遠州芝本駅, Enshū-Shibamoto-eki) is a railway station in Hamana-ku, Hamamatsu, Shizuoka Prefecture, Japan, operated by the private railway company, Enshū Railway.

== Lines ==
Hamakita Station is a station on the Enshū Railway Line and is 15.0 kilometers from the starting point of the line at Shin-Hamamatsu Station.

== Station layout ==
The station has a single island platform, with the station building built onto one end of the platform. The station building has automated ticket machines, and automated turnstiles which accept the NicePass smart card, as well as ET Card, a magnetic card ticketing system. The station is unattended.

=== Platforms ===
west	■ Enshū Railway Line	for Nishi-Kajima
east	■ Enshū Railway Line	for Shin-Hamamatsu

== Adjacent stations ==
«	Service	»
Enshū Railway
Enshū Railway Line
Enshū-Kobayashi	-	Enshū-Gansuiji

== Station History ==
Enshū-Shibamoto Station was established on December 6, 1909 as Shibamoto Station (芝本駅, Shibamoto-eki). It was given its present name in April 1923. The station was rebuilt in 1990 approximately 110 meters south of its former location.

== Passenger statistics ==
In fiscal 2017, the station was used by an average of 658 passengers daily (boarding passengers only).

== Surrounding area ==
- Hamakita Special Education School

== See also ==
- List of railway stations in Japan
