= Sukenobu Station =

Railway station in Hamamatsu, Japan

Sukenobu Station 助信駅
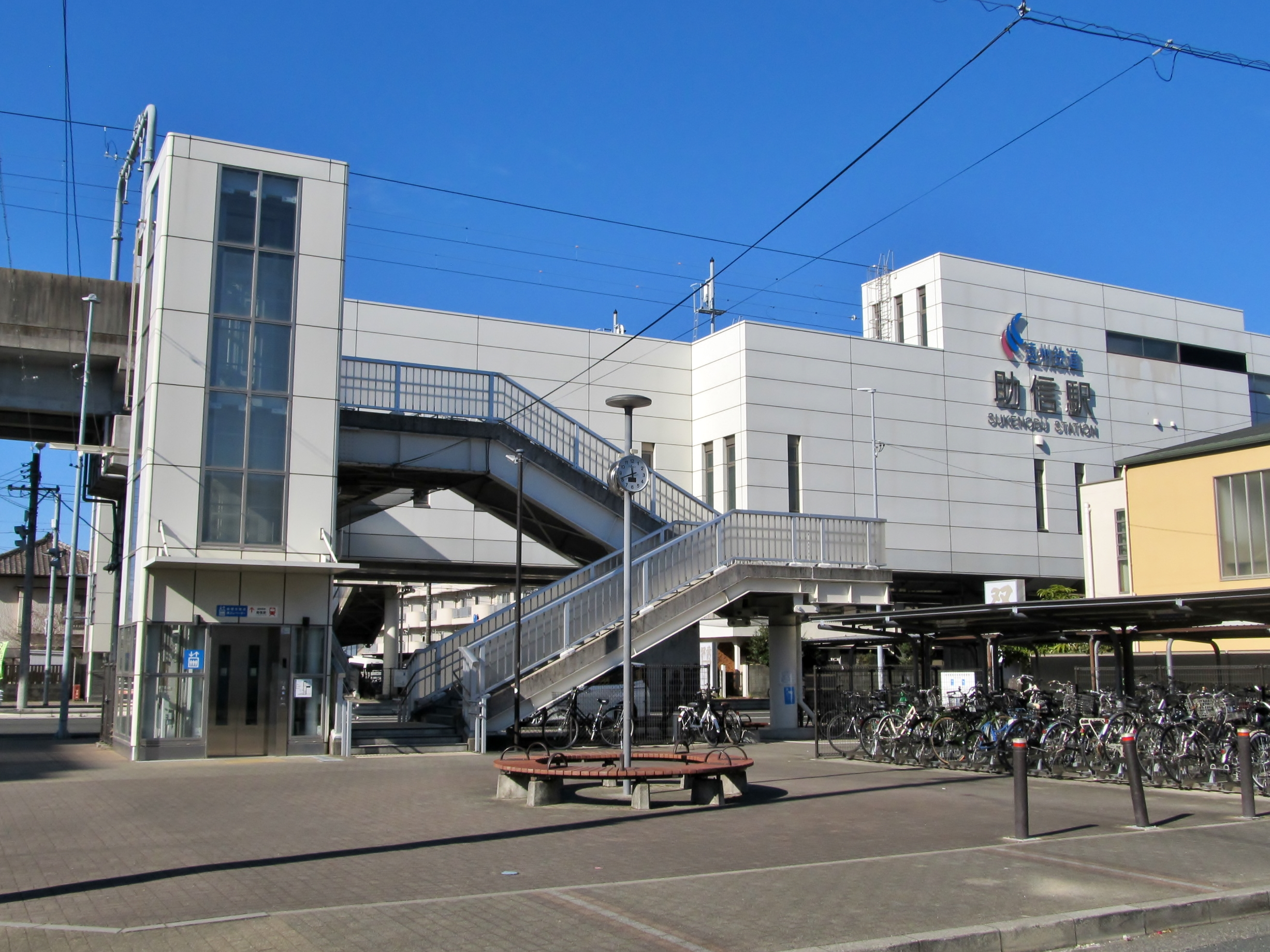
- Sukenobu Station in 2 January 2025

General information
- Location: Sukenobu-cho, Chūō-ku, Hamamatsu-shi, Shizuoka-ken 430-0903; Japan
- Coordinates: 34°43′27.49″N 137°44′19.31″E
- Operator: Enshū Railway
- Line: ■ Enshū Railway Line
- Distance: 2.4 km from Shin-Hamamatsu
- Platforms: 2 side platforms

Other information
- Status: Staffed
- Station code: 05

History
- Opened: December 6, 1909
- Former names: Sukenobu (to 1935), Enshū-Sukenobu (to 1985)

Passengers
- FY2017: 1,324 (daily)
Location
- Location within Shizuoka Prefecture Location within Japan

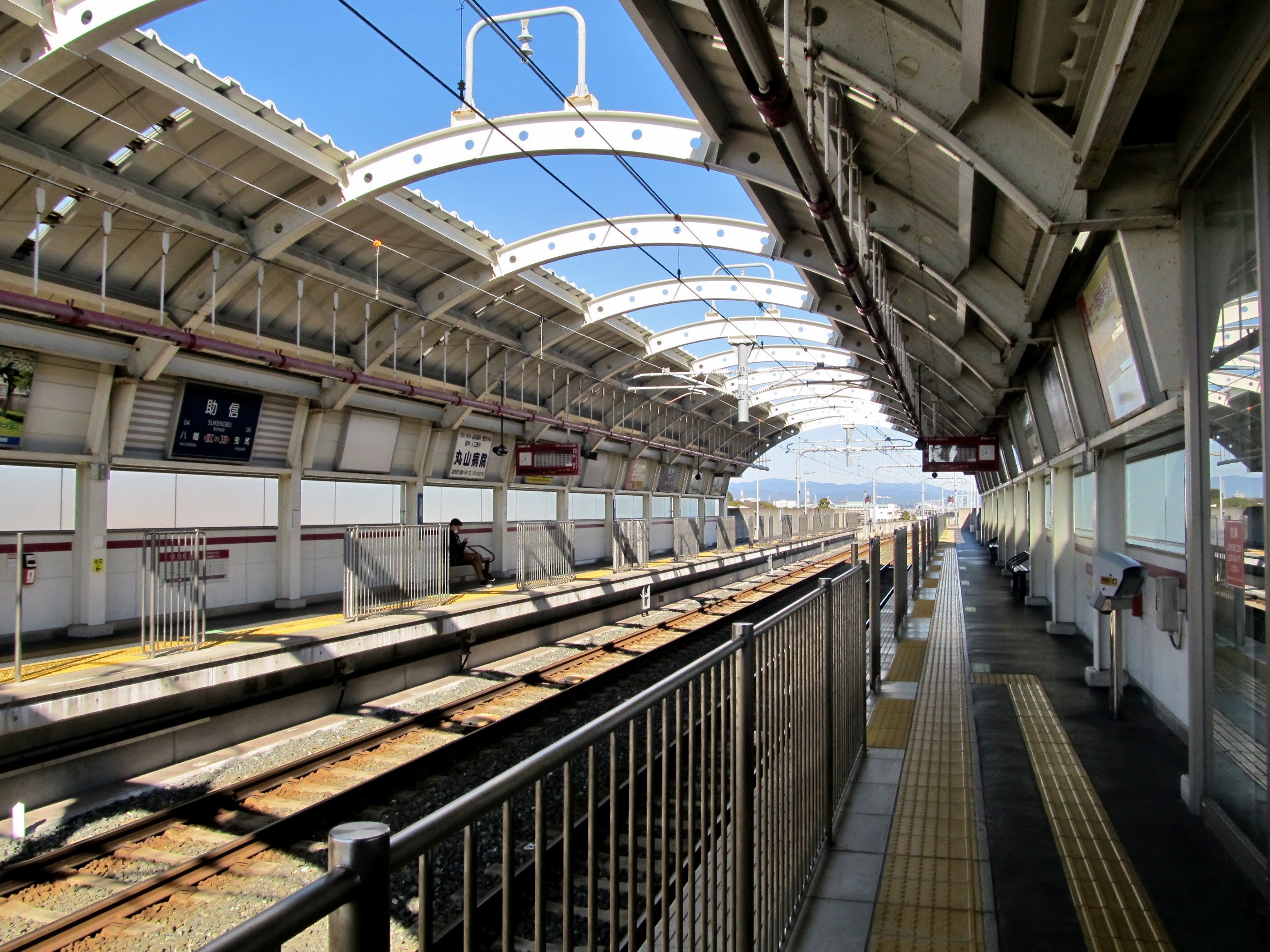
Platform

Sukenobu Station (助信駅, Sukenobu-eki) is a railway station in Chūō-ku, Hamamatsu, Shizuoka Prefecture, Japan, operated by the private railway company, Enshū Railway.

== Lines ==
Sukenobu Station is a station on the Enshū Railway Line and is 2.4 kilometers from the starting point of the line at Shin-Hamamatsu Station.

== Station layout ==
The station is an elevated station with dual opposed side platforms. It is staffed during daylight hours. The station building has automated ticket machines, and automated turnstiles which accept the NicePass smart card, as well as ET Card, a magnetic card ticketing system.

=== Platforms ===
1	■ Enshū Railway Line	for Hamakita and Nishi-Kajima
2	■ Enshū Railway Line	for Shin-Hamamatsu

== Adjacent stations ==
«	Service	»
Enshū Railway
Enshū Railway Line
Hachiman	-	Hikuma

== Station history ==
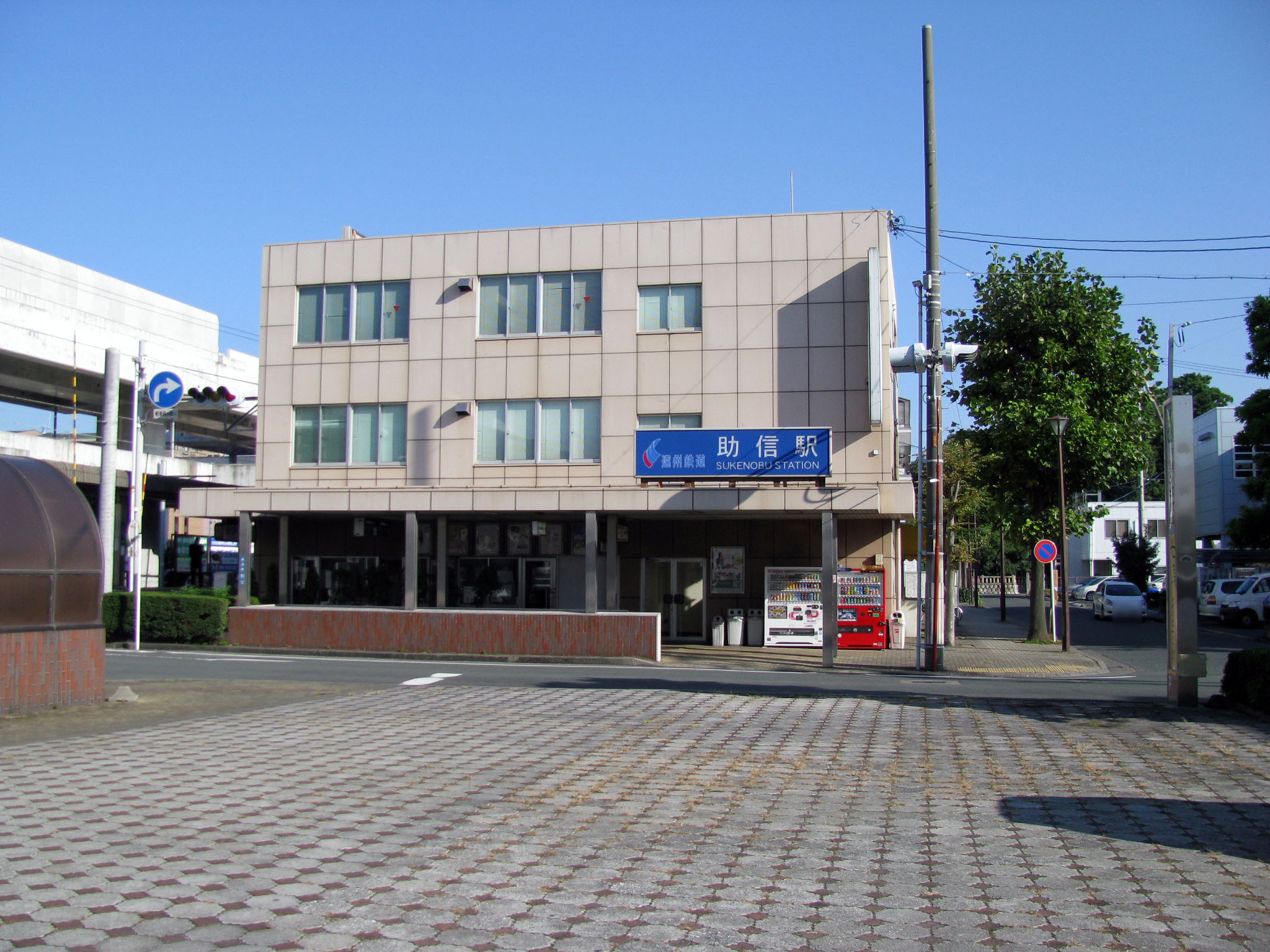
Old Sukenobu Station (1985-2012)

Sukenobu Station was established on December 6, 1909. It was renamed as Enshū-Sukenobu Station (遠州助信駅, Enshū-Sukenobu-eki) in 1926, reverting to its original name and moved from Shinzu-cho (新津町) in 1985. The station building was rebuilt in 1953. All freight operations ceased in 1974. The tracks were elevated, changing from an island platform to an opposed side platform layout, and a new station building was completed in 1985.

== Passenger statistics ==
In fiscal 2017, the station was used by an average of 1,324 passengers daily (boarding passengers only).

== Surrounding area ==
The station is located in a residential area.

== See also ==
- List of railway stations in Japan
