= Hikuma Station =

Railway station in Hamamatsu, Japan

Hikuma Station 曳馬駅
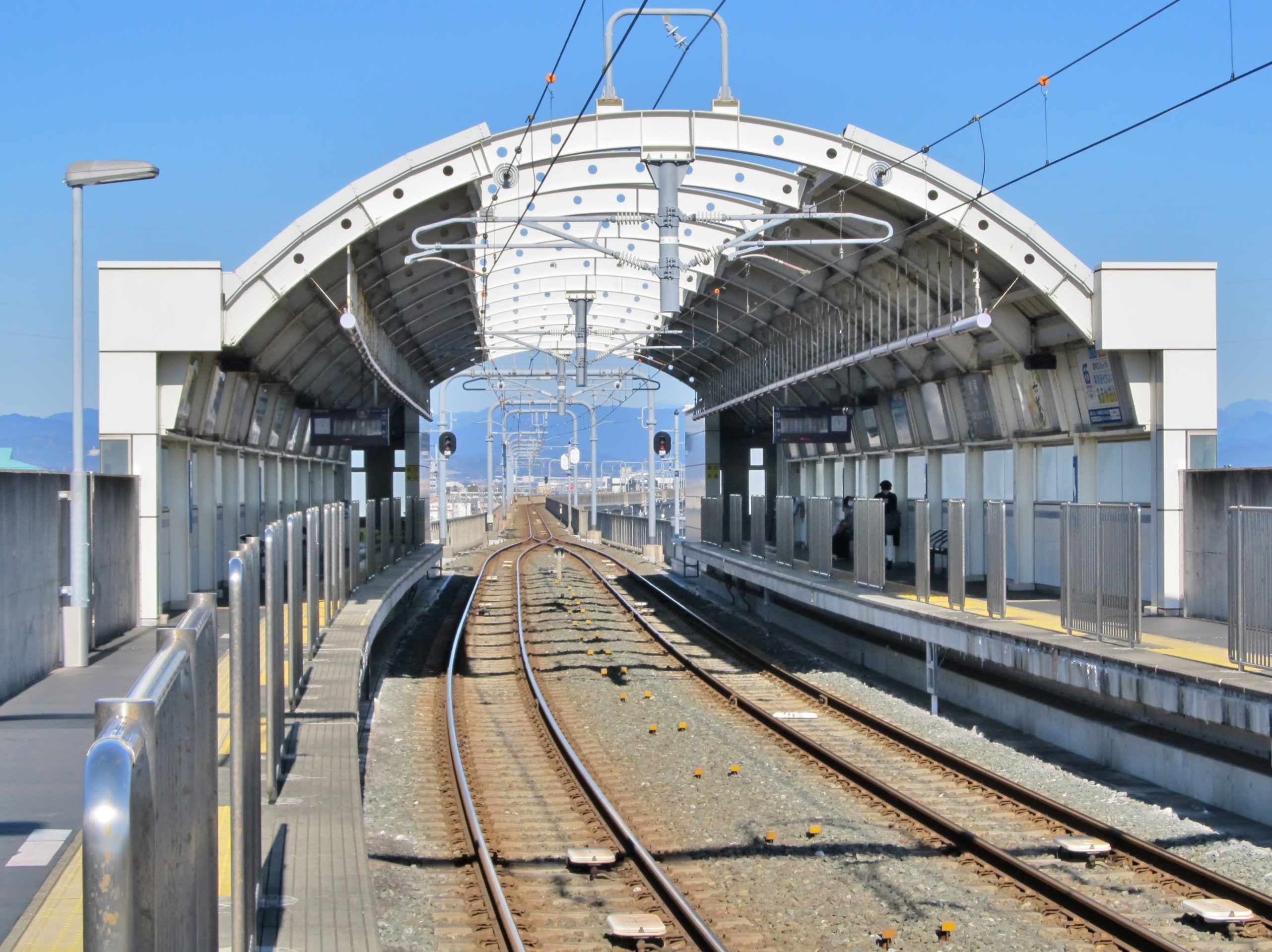
- Hikuma Station in 2 January 2025

General information
- Location: Hikuma 4-20-3, Chūō-ku, Hamamatsu-shi, Shizuoka-ken 430-0901; Japan
- Coordinates: 34°43′59.83″N 137°44′29.04″E
- Operator: Enshū Railway
- Line: ■ Enshū Railway Line
- Distance: 3.4 km from Shin-Hamamatsu
- Platforms: 2 side platforms

Other information
- Status: Staffed
- Station code: 06

History
- Opened: December 6, 1909
- Former names: Nakanogo (to 1926), Enshū Nakanogo (to 1951), Enshū-Hikuma (to 2012)

Passengers
- FY2017: 1,288 (daily)
Location
- Location within Shizuoka Prefecture Location within Japan

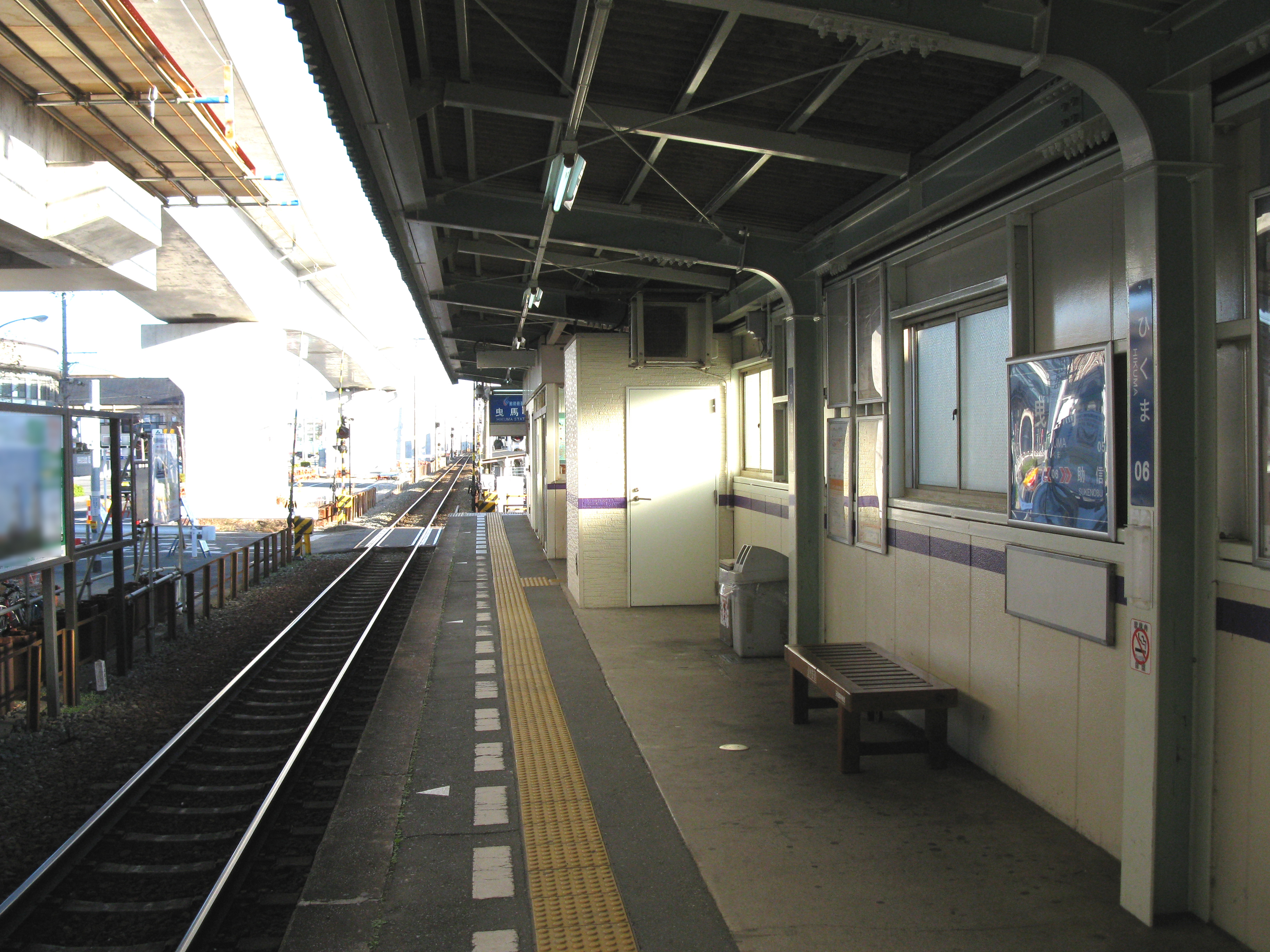
Platform

Hikuma Station (曳馬駅, Hikuma-eki) is a railway station in Chūō-ku, Hamamatsu, Shizuoka Prefecture, Japan, operated by the private railway company, Enshū Railway.

== Lines ==
Hikuma Station is a station on the Enshū Railway Line and is 3.4 kilometers from the starting point of the line at Shin-Hamamatsu Station.

== Station layout ==
The station is an elevated station with dual opposed side platforms serving two tracks. It is staffed during daylight hours. The station building has automated ticket machines, and automated turnstiles which accept the NicePass smart card, as well as ET Card, a magnetic card ticketing system.

=== Platforms ===
1	■ Enshū Railway Line	for Hamakita and Nishi-Kajima
2	■ Enshū Railway Line	for Shin-Hamamatsu

== Adjacent stations ==
«	Service	»
Enshū Railway
Enshū Railway Line
Sukenobu	-	Kamijima

== Station History ==
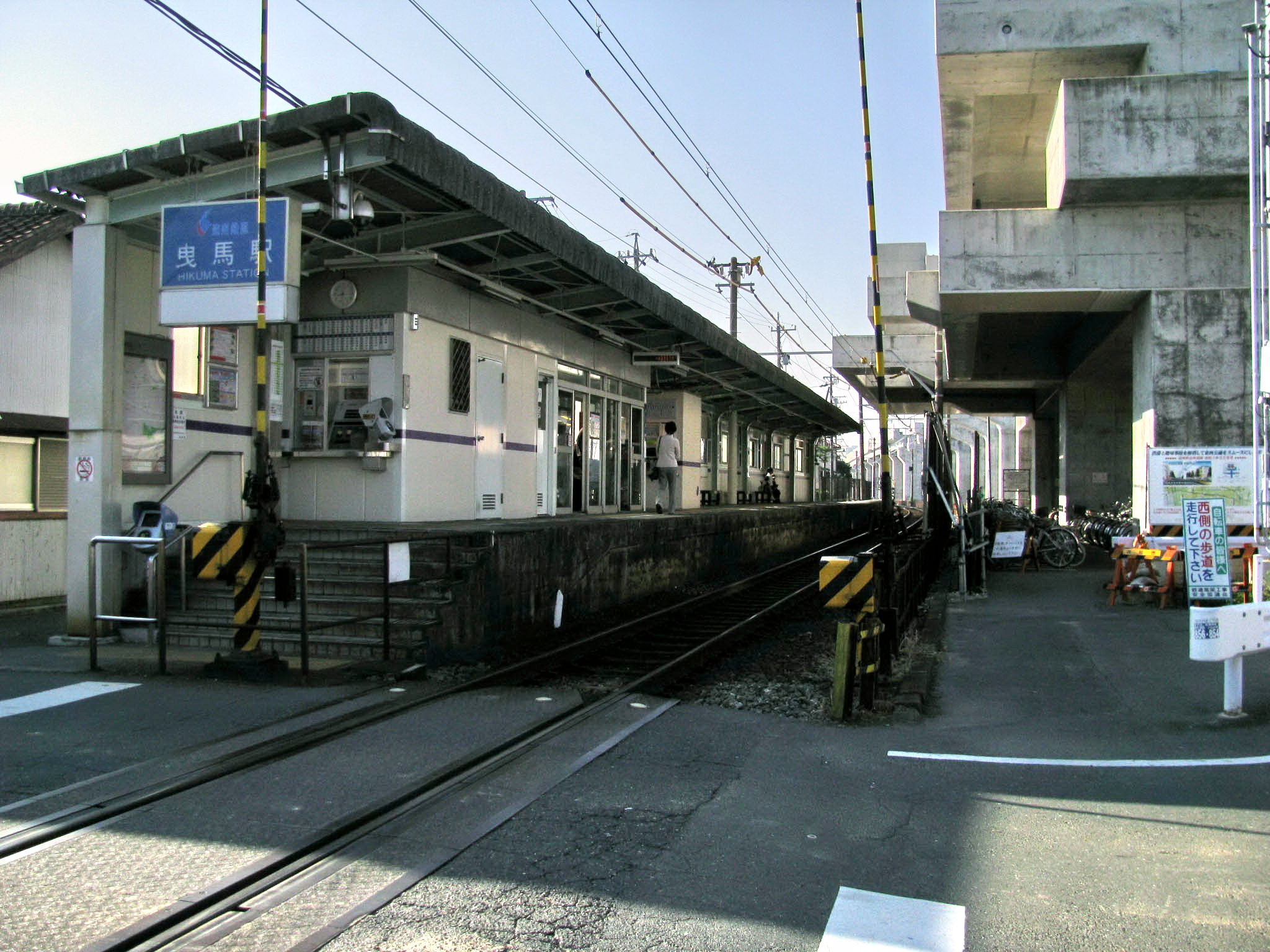
Enshū-Hikuma Station pre-2012

Hikuma Station was established on December 6, 1909 as Nakanogo Station (島ノ郷駅, Nakanogo-eki). It was renamed as Enshū-Nakanogo Station (遠州島ノ郷駅, Enshū-Nakanogo-eki) in 1926, renamed as Enshū-Hikuma Station (遠州曳馬駅, Enshū-Hikuma-eki) in 1951, renamed to its present name in 2012, when the tracks were elevated and the station building rebuilt.

== Passenger statistics ==
In fiscal 2017, the station was used by an average of 1,288 passengers daily (boarding passengers only).

== Surrounding area ==
- Hikuma Junior High School

== See also ==
- List of railway stations in Japan
