= Misono Chūōkōen Station =

Railway station in Hamamatsu, Japan

Misono-Chūō-kōen Station 美薗中央公園駅
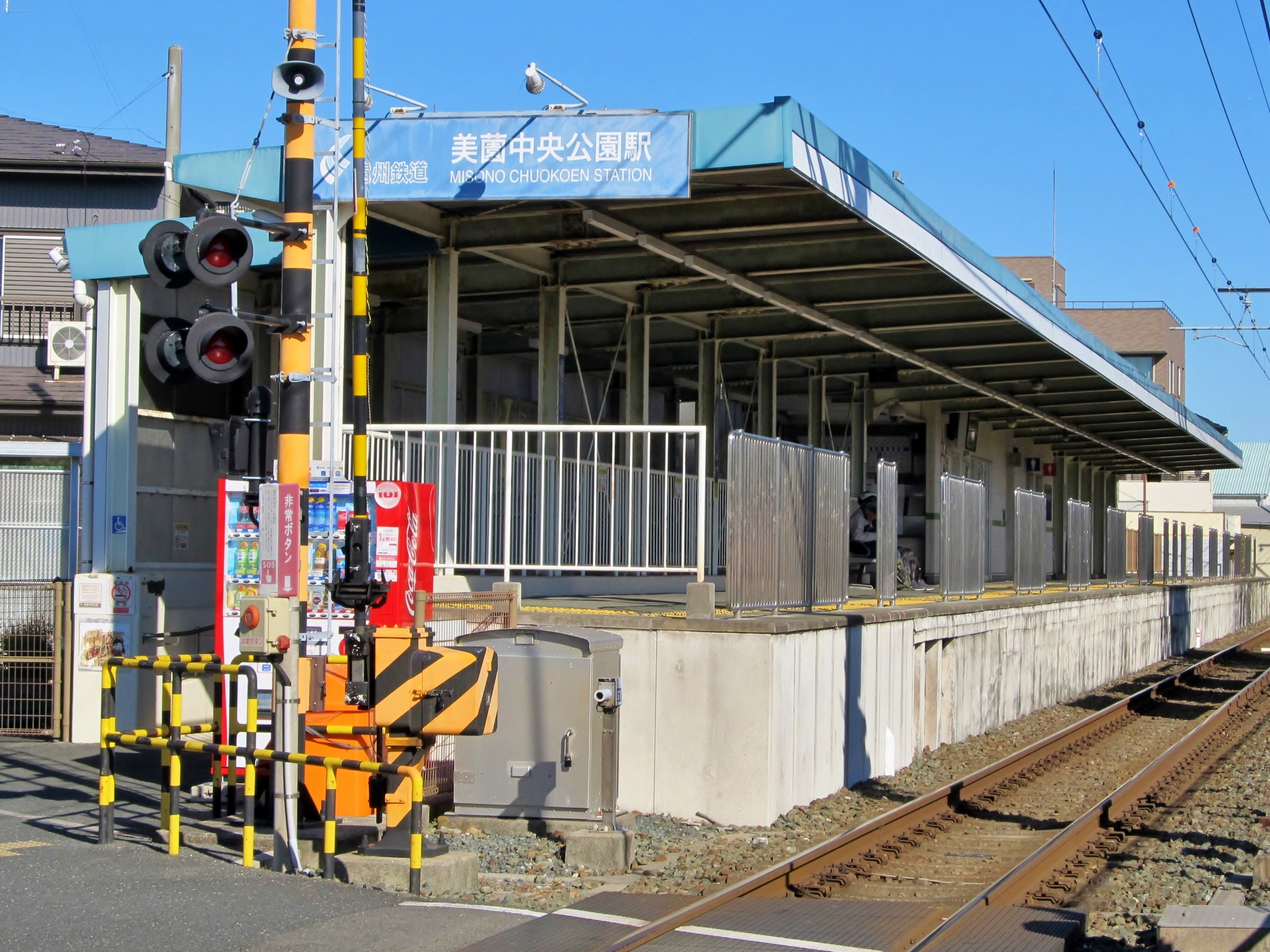
- Misono-Chūō-kōen Station in 2 January 2025

General information
- Location: Kibune 487-3, Hamana-ku, Hamamatsu-shi, Shizuoka-ken 434-0038; Japan
- Coordinates: 34°47′52.25″N 137°47′22.24″E
- Operator: Enshū Railway
- Line: ■ Enshū Railway Line
- Distance: 12.0 km from Shin-Hamamatsu
- Platforms: 1 side platform

Other information
- Status: Untaffed
- Station code: 14

History
- Opened: April 1, 1951
- Former names: Hamakita (to 1977); Kitahama Chugakkō (to 2007)

Passengers
- FY2017: 1,110 (daily)
Location
- Location within Shizuoka Prefecture Location within Japan

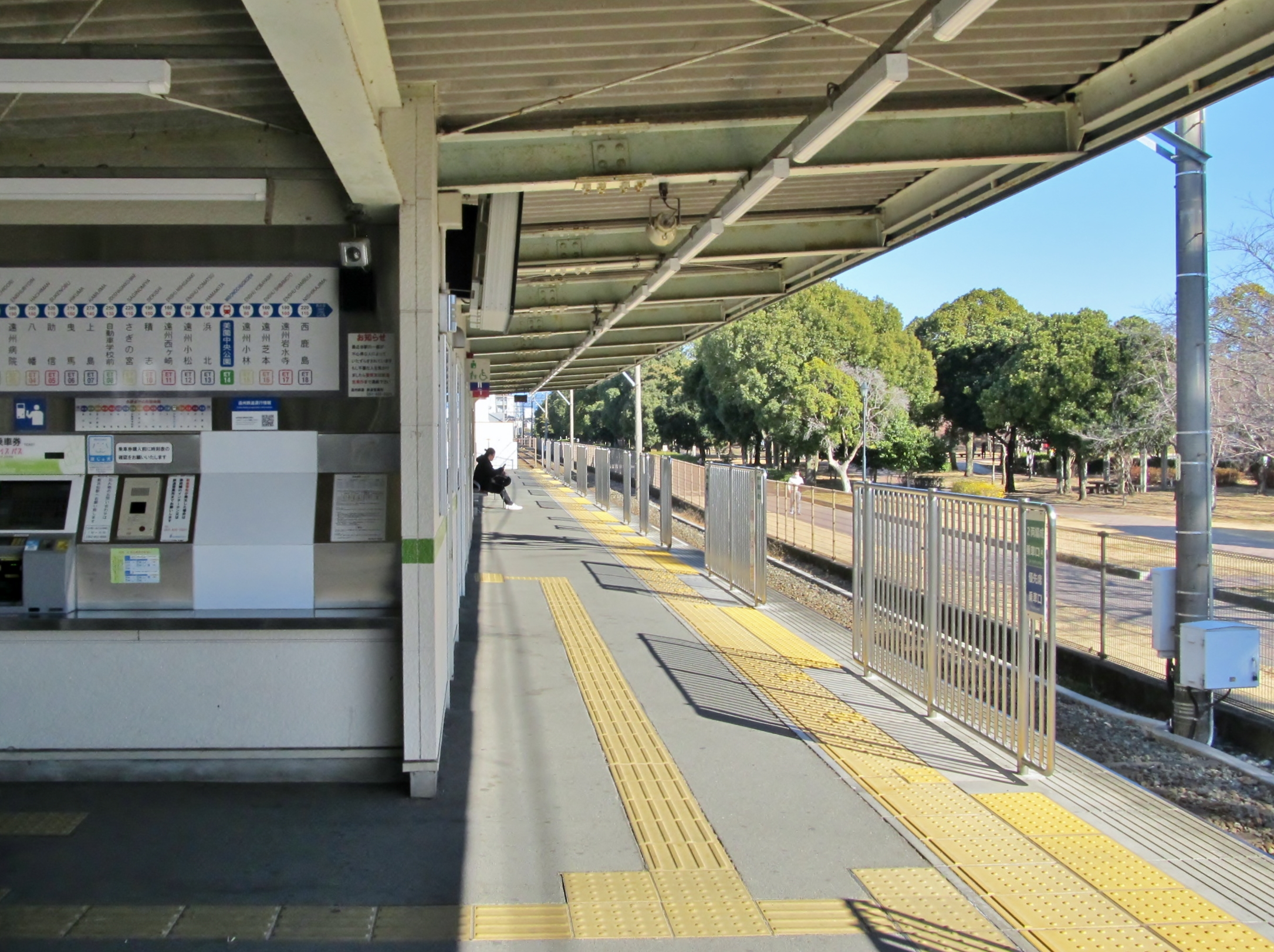
Platform

Misono Chūōkōen Station (美薗中央公園駅, Misono Chūōkōen-eki) is a railway station in Hamana-ku, Hamamatsu, Shizuoka Prefecture, Japan, operated by the private railway company, Enshū Railway.

== Lines ==
Misono Chūōkōen Station is a station on the Enshū Railway Line and is 12.0 kilometers from the starting point of the line at Shin-Hamamatsu Station.

== Station layout ==
The station has a one side platform, serving a single bi-directional track. The station building has automated ticket machines, and automated turnstiles which accept the NicePass smart card, as well as ET Card, a magnetic card ticketing system. The station is unattended.

== Adjacent stations ==
«	Service	»
Enshū Railway
Enshū Railway Line
Hamakita	-	Enshū-Kobayashi

== Station History ==
Misono Chūōkōen Station was established on April 1, 1951 as the original Hamakita Station It was renamed Kitahama Chugakkō Station (北浜中学校前駅, Kitahama Chugakkōmae-eki) in August 1977, and given its present name in August 2007.

== Passenger statistics ==
In fiscal 2017, the station was used by an average of 1,110 passengers daily (boarding passengers only).

== Surrounding area ==
- Hamakita Junior High School
- Misono Central Park

== See also ==
- List of railway stations in Japan
