= Saginomiya Station (Shizuoka) =

Railway station in Hamamatsu, Japan

Saginomiya Station さぎの宮駅
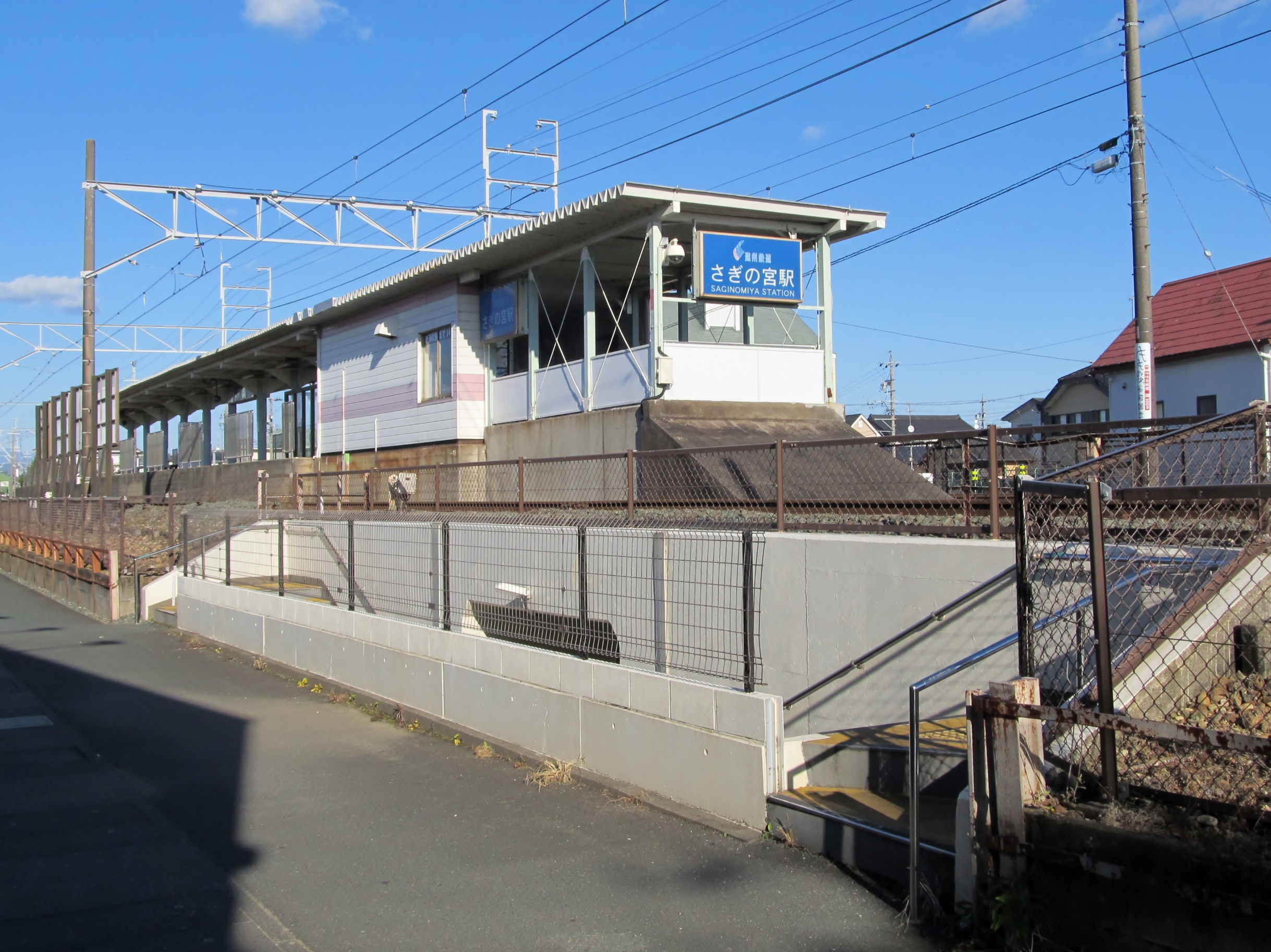
- Saginomiya Station in 2 January 2025

General information
- Location: Ose-cho 417-2, Chūō-ku, Hamamatsu-shi, Shizuoka-ken 431-3113; Japan
- Coordinates: 34°45′26.87″N 137°45′26.81″E
- Operator: Enshū Railway
- Line: ■ Enshū Railway Line
- Distance: 6.6 km from Shin-Hamamatsu
- Platforms: 1 island platforms

Other information
- Status: Staffed
- Station code: 09

History
- Opened: December 6, 1909

Passengers
- FY2017: 1,138 (daily)
Location
- Location within Shizuoka Prefecture Location within Japan

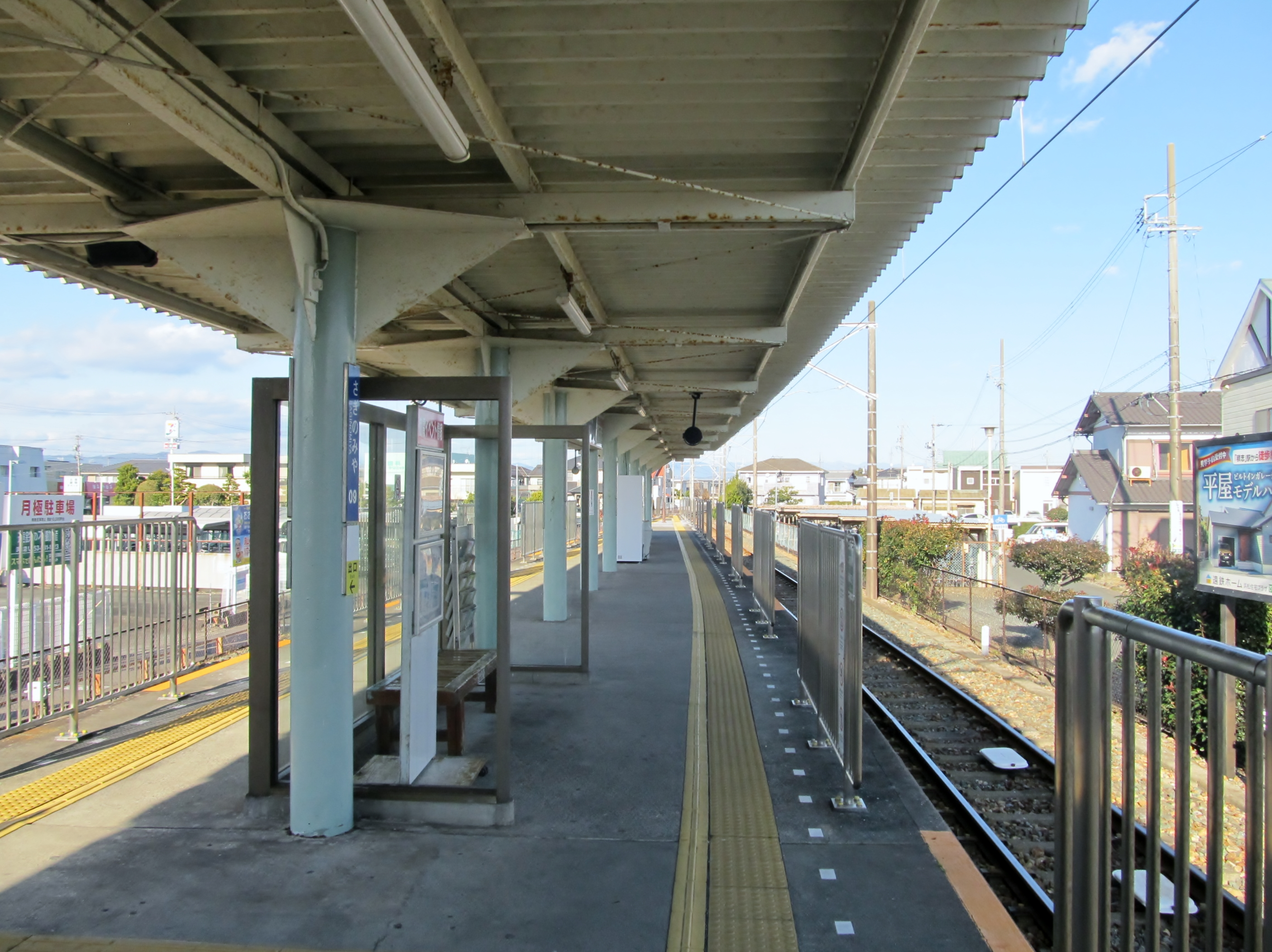
Platform

Saginomiya Station (さぎの宮駅, Saginomiya-eki)is a railway station in Chūō-ku, Hamamatsu, Shizuoka Prefecture, Japan, operated by the private railway company, Enshū Railway.

== Lines ==
Saginomiya Station is a station on the Enshū Railway Line and is 6.6 kilometers from the starting point of the line at Shin-Hamamatsu Station.

== Station layout ==
The station has one elevated island platform with the station building underneath. The station building has automated ticket machines, and automated turnstiles which accept the NicePass smart card, as well as ET Card, a magnetic card ticketing system. The station is staffed.

=== Platforms ===
1	■ Enshū Railway Line	for Shin-Hamamatsu
2	■ Enshū Railway Line	for Hamakita and Nishi-Kajima

== Adjacent stations ==
«	Service	»
Enshū Railway
Enshū Railway Line
Jidōshagakkō Mae	-	Sekishi

== Station history ==
Saginomiya Station was established on December 6, 1909. In October 1972, the station was rebuilt at a new location 100 metres north of its original location, and the next station on the line (the Enshū-Niimiura Station (遠州新村駅) was abolished.

== Passenger statistics ==
In fiscal 2017, the station was used by an average of 1,138 passengers daily (boarding passengers only).

== Surrounding area ==
The station is in a commercial suburb of Hamamatsu.

== See also ==
- List of railway stations in Japan
- Kisaragi Station, an urban legend allegedly influenced by the station
