= Enshū-Gansuiji Station =

Railway station in Hamamatsu, Japan

Enshū-Gansuiji Station 遠州岩水寺駅
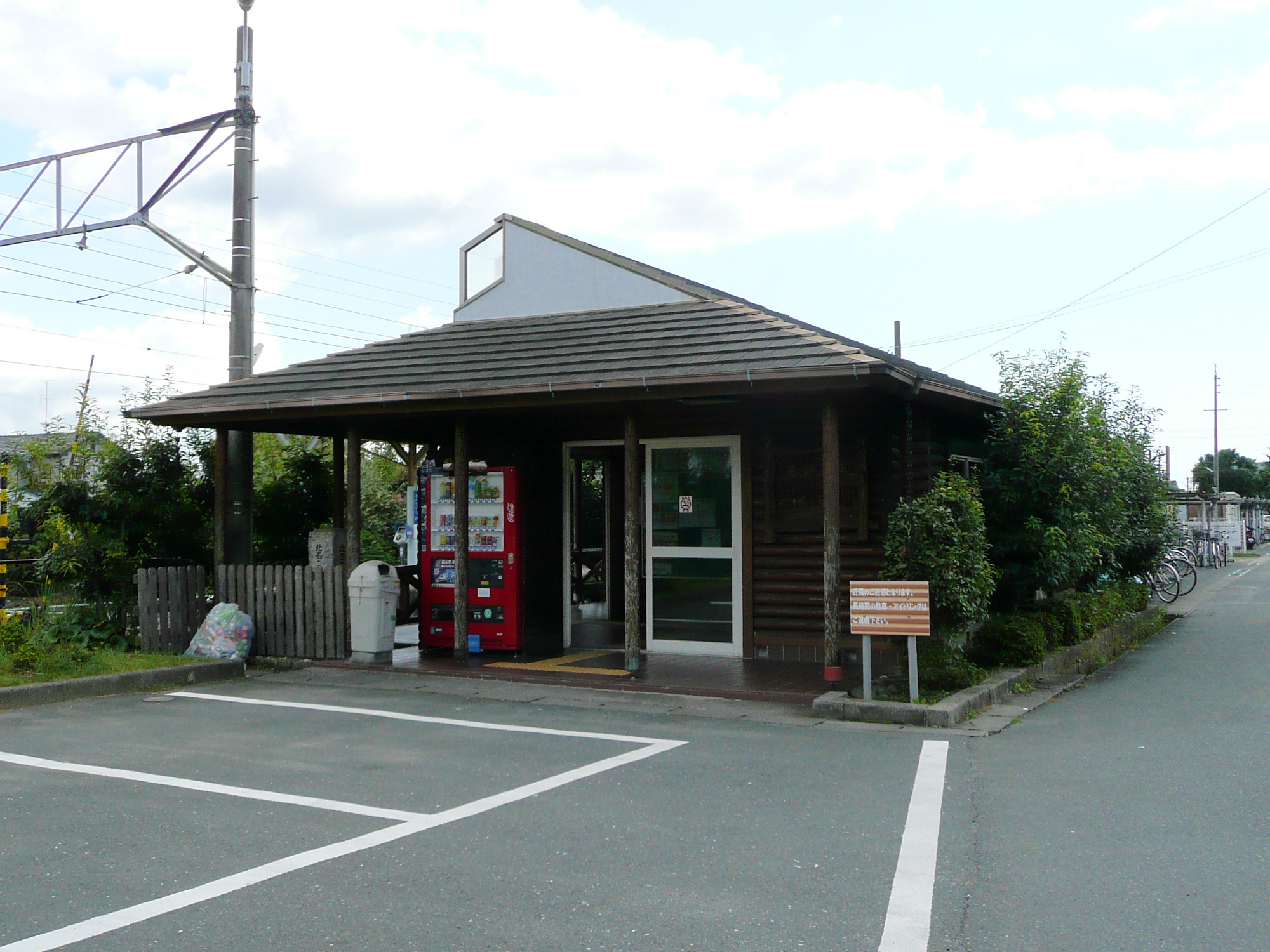
- Enshū-Gansuiji Station

General information
- Location: Oro 2819-3, Hamana, Hamamatsu, Shizuoka （静岡県 浜松市浜北区於呂2819-3） Japan
- Coordinates: 34°50′5.26″N 137°48′4.01″E
- Operator: Enshū Railway
- Line: ■ Enshū Railway Line
- Distance: 16.3 km from Shin-Hamamatsu
- Platforms: 1 island platform

Other information
- Status: Unstaffed
- Station code: 17

History
- Opened: December 6, 1909
- Former names: Gansuiji (to 1923)

Passengers
- FY2017: 429 (daily)
Location
- Location within Shizuoka Prefecture Location within Japan

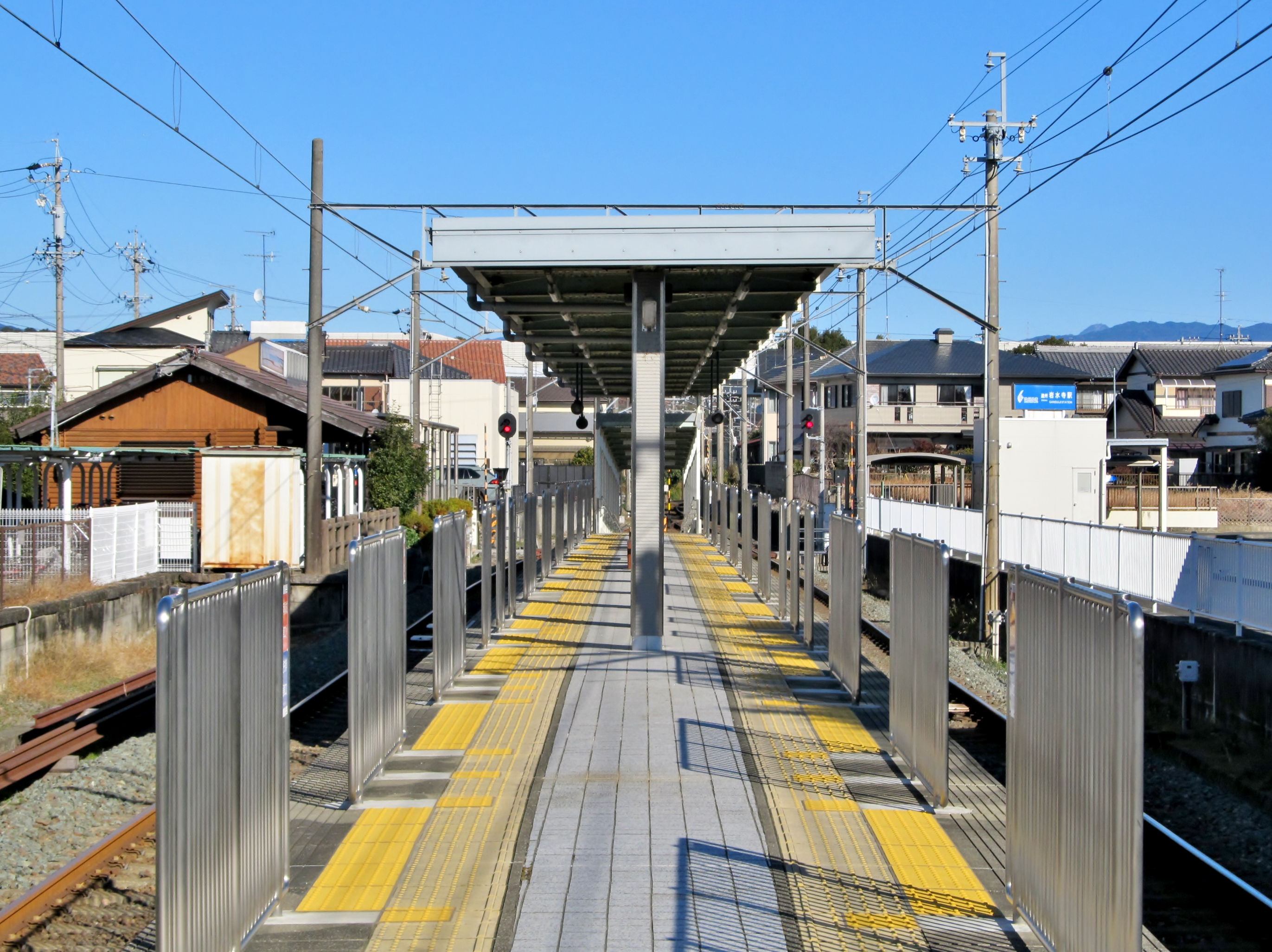
Platform

Enshū-Gansuiji Station (遠州岩水寺駅, Enshū-Gansuiji-eki) is a railway station in Hamana-ku, Hamamatsu, Shizuoka Prefecture, Japan, operated by the private railway company, Enshū Railway.

== Lines ==
Enshū-Gansuiji Station is a station on the Enshū Railway Line and is 16.3 kilometers from the starting point of the line at Shin-Hamamatsu Station.

== Station layout ==
The station has a single unnumbered island platform, connected to a small, rustic wooden station building. The station building has automated ticket machines, and automated turnstiles which accept the NicePass smart card, as well as ET Card, a magnetic card ticketing system. The station is unattended.

=== Platforms ===
east	■ Enshū Railway Line	for Shin-Hamamatsu; Nishi-Kajima
west	■ Enshū Railway Line	for siding

== Adjacent stations ==
«	Service	»
Enshū Railway
Enshū Railway Line
Enshū-Shibamoto	-	Nishi-Kajima

== Station History ==
Enshū-Gansuiji Station was established on December 6, 1909 as Gansuiji Station (岩水寺駅, Gansuiji-eki). It was given its present name in April 1923. The station has been unattended since 1974.

== Passenger statistics ==
In fiscal 2017, the station was used by an average of 429 passengers daily (boarding passengers only).

== Surrounding area ==
- Gansu-ji
- Shizuoka Prefectural Forest Park

== See also ==
- List of railway stations in Japan
