= Saginomiya Station =

Saginomiya Station is the name of two train stations in Japan:

- Saginomiya Station (Shizuoka) (さぎの宮駅)
- Saginomiya Station (Tokyo) (鷺ノ宮駅)
