= Daiichidōri Station =

Railway station in Hamamatsu, Japan

Daiichidōri Station 第一通り駅
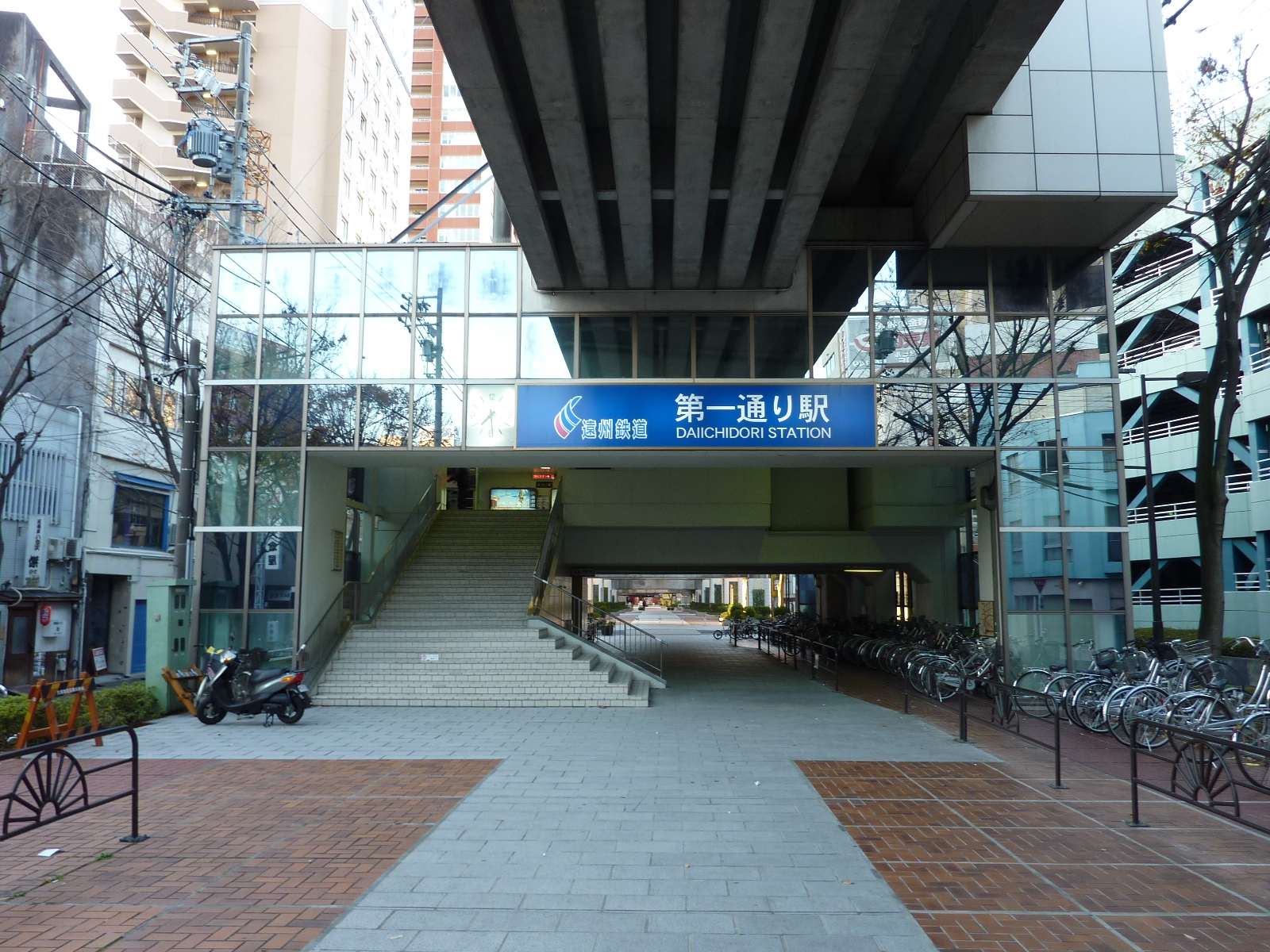
- Daiichidōri Station in December 2009

General information
- Location: Tamachi 230-28, Chūō-ku, Hamamatsu-shi, Shizuoka-ken 430-0944; Japan
- Coordinates: 34°42′26.06″N 137°43′57.62″E
- Operator: Enshū Railway
- Line: ■ Enshū Railway Line
- Distance: 0.5 km from Shin-Hamamatsu
- Platforms: 1 side platform

Other information
- Status: Staffed
- Station code: 02

History
- Opened: December 1, 1985

Passengers
- FY2017: 1,420 (daily)
Location
- Location within Shizuoka Prefecture Location within Japan

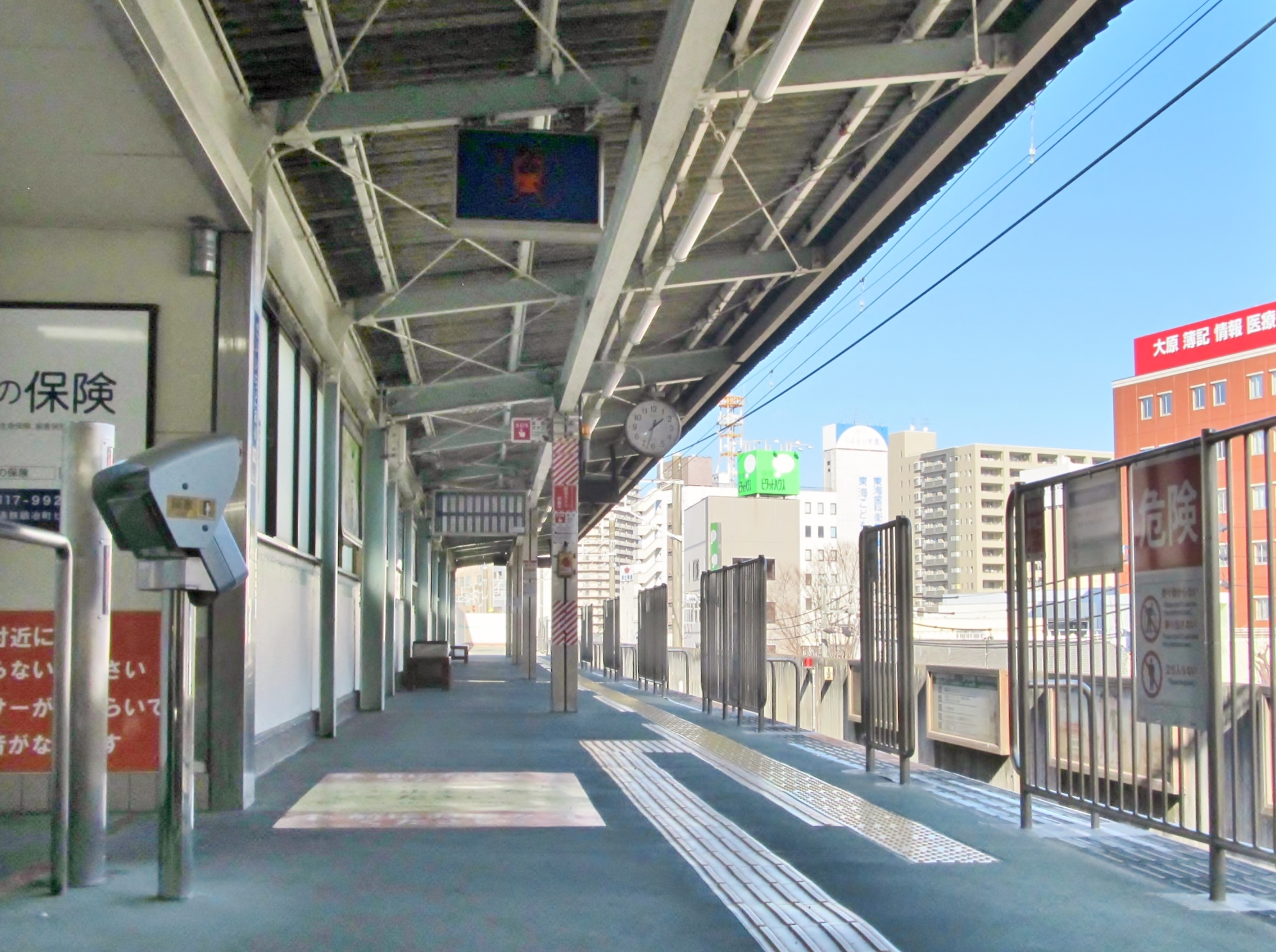
Platform

Daiichidōri Station (第一通り駅, Daiichidōri-eki) is a railway station in Chūō-ku, Hamamatsu, Shizuoka Prefecture, Japan, operated by the private railway company, Enshū Railway.

== Lines ==
Daiichidōri Station is a station on the Enshū Railway Line and is 0.5 kilometers from the starting point of the line at Shin-Hamamatsu Station.

== Station layout ==
The station is a viaduct station with a single elevated side platform. It is staffed during daylight hours. The station building has automated ticket machines, and automated turnstiles, which accepts the NicePass smart card, as well as ET Card, a magnetic card ticketing system.

== Adjacent stations ==
«	Service	»
Enshū Railway
Enshū Railway Line
Shin-Hamamatsu	-	Enshūbyōin

== Station history ==
Daiichidōri Station was established on December 1, 1985 as a commuter station in downtown Hamamatsu city.

== Passenger statistics ==
In fiscal 2017, the station was used by an average of 1,420 passengers daily (boarding passengers only).

== Surrounding area ==
- National Route 152

== See also ==
- List of railway stations in Japan
