= Enshū Railway Line =

Railway line in Shizuoka Prefecture, Japan

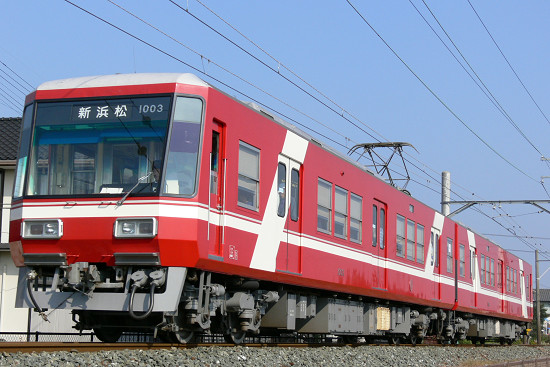
- 1000 type EMU, the "Red Train"

Overview
- Native name: 鉄道線 (Tetsudō-sen)
- Owner: Enshū Railway
- Locale: Shizuoka Prefecture, Japan
- Termini: Shin-Hamamatsu; Nishi-Kajima
- Stations: 18
- Website: www.entetsu.co.jp

Service
- Operator: Enshū Railway

History
- Opened: December 6, 1909

Technical
- Line length: 17.8 kilometres (11.1 mi)
- Track gauge: 1,067 mm (3 ft 6 in)
- Electrification: 750 V DC

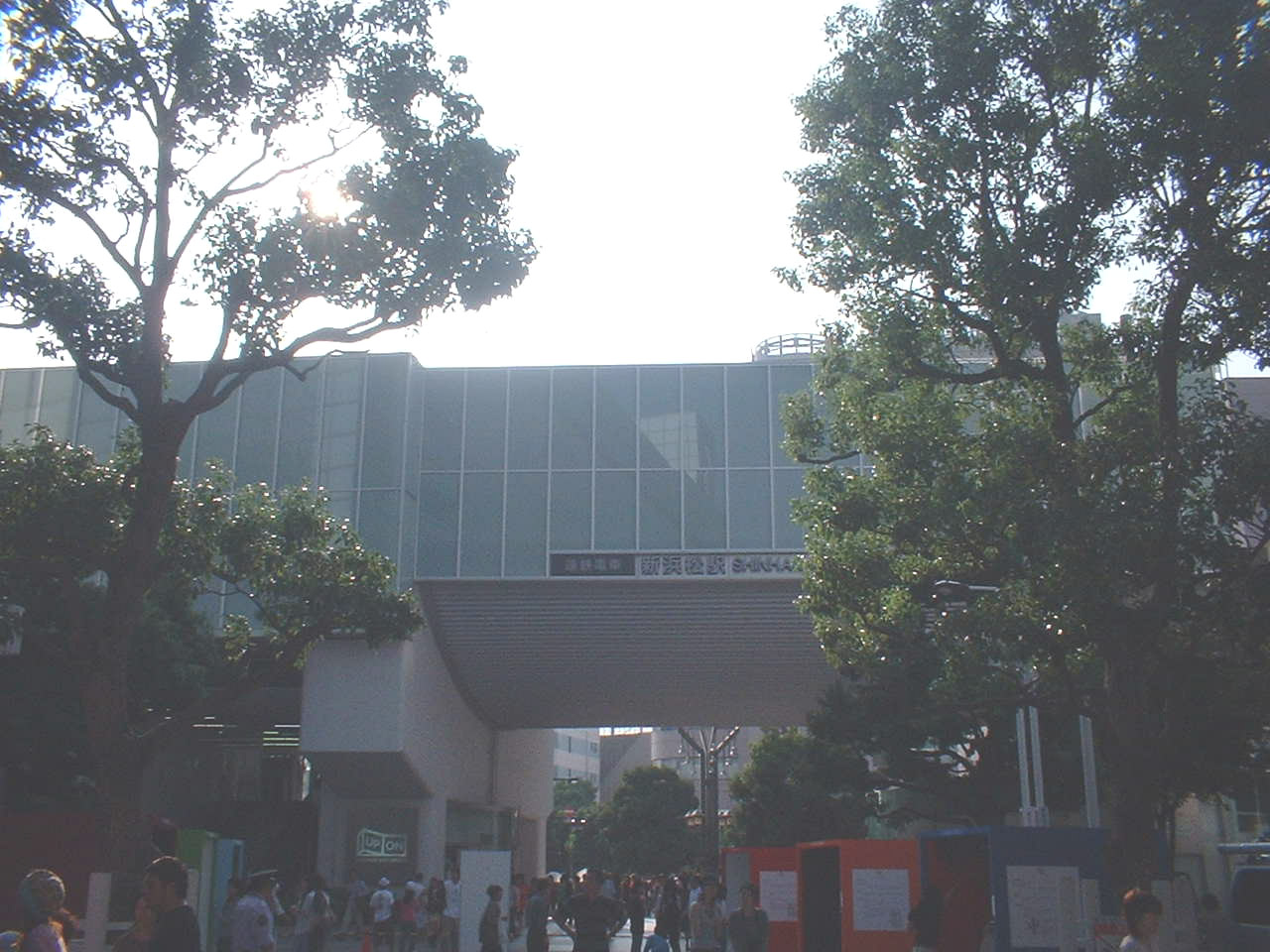
Shin-Hamamatsu Station

The Enshū Railway Line, officially the Railway Line (鉄道線, Tetsudō-sen), is a Japanese railway line in Shizuoka Prefecture, running north from Shin-Hamamatsu Station in Chūō Ward to Nishi-Kajima Station in Tenryū Ward, all within Hamamatsu. This is the only railway line Enshū Railway (Entetsu) operates. The line is nicknamed the Nishi-Kajima Line (西鹿島線, Nishi-Kajima-sen), while locals often call it Akaden (あかでん, "The Red Train"), referring to the color of the EMUs. The line accepts NicePass, a smart card ticketing system, as well as ET Card, a magnetic card ticketing system.

Railway signalling on this line is automatic.

== History ==
Most of the line opened as a 762 mm (2 ft 6 in) narrow-gauge railway on December 6, 1909, by the Dai-Nippon Light Railway. The line was transferred to the Enshu Railway (later renamed to Enshu Electric Railway) on October 12, 1919. On April 1, 1923, the line was closed as a narrow-gauge railway and was converted to 1,067 mm (3 ft 6 in) gauge railway, electrified at 600 VDC. The line was extended from Entetsu-Hamamatsu (since closed) to Enshu-Magome (also closed) on February 1, 1924 and to the current Shin-Hamamatsu station on September 1, 1927. The voltage was increased to 750 VDC in 1961, and CTC signalling was commissioned between Nishi-Kajima and Hachiman in 1967, and extended to Shin-Hamamatsu in 1974.

Freight services ceased in 1976.

=== Former connecting lines ===
- Hamakita station - The Seien Railway Co. opened a 4 km (2.5 mi) 762 mm (2 ft 6 in) gauge line to Miyaguchi in 1924, and merged with the Enshu Railway Co. in 1928. The line closed in 1937.

== Services ==
Trains operate every 12 minutes all day, every day. Early morning and after 9pm trains operate every 20 minutes. All trains stop at every station.

== Stations ==
All stations are within Hamamatsu, Shizuoka.

No.	Station		Distance (km)	Transfers	Location
01	Shin-Hamamatsu	新浜松	0.0	JR: Tōkaidō Main Line, Tōkaidō Shinkansen (both at Hamamatsu)	Chūō-ku
02	Daiichidōri	第一通り	0.5		Chūō-ku
03	Enshūbyōin	遠州病院	0.8		Chūō-ku
04	Hachiman	八幡	1.6		Chūō-ku
05	Sukenobu	助信	2.4		Chūō-ku
06	Hikuma	曳馬	3.4		Chūō-ku
07	Kamijima	上島	4.5		Chūō-ku
08	Jidōshagakkō Mae	自動車学校前	5.3		Chūō-ku
09	Saginomiya	さぎの宮	6.6		Chūō-ku
10	Sekishi	積志	7.8		Chūō-ku
11	Enshū-Nishigasaki	遠州西ヶ崎	9.2		Chūō-ku
12	Enshū-Komatsu	遠州小松	10.2		Hamana-ku
13	Hamakita	浜北	11.2		Hamana-ku
14	Misono Chūōkōen	美薗中央公園	12.0		Hamana-ku
15	Enshū-Kobayashi	遠州小林	13.3		Hamana-ku
16	Enshū-Shibamoto	遠州芝本	15.0		Hamana-ku
17	Enshū-Gansuiji	遠州岩水寺	16.3		Hamana-ku
18	Nishi-Kajima	西鹿島	17.8	Tenryū Hamanako Railroad: Tenryū Hamanako Line	Tenryū-ku

== In popular culture ==
Enshū Railway Line is the setting of the Japanese Urban Legend "Kisaragi Station".

== See also ==
- Kanzanji Ropeway
- List of railway lines in Japan
