= Kanzanji Ropeway =

Coordinates: 34°46′11.7″N 137°37′13.5″E

- Interactive map of Kanzanji Ropeway

Overview
- Status: Operational
- Character: Aerial tramway
- Location: Chūō, Hamamatsu, Shizuoka, Japan
- No. of stations: 2
- Open: 1960

Operation
- Operator: Entetsu Tourism Development
- Carrier capacity: 61 Passengers per cabin, 2 cabins
- Trip duration: 4 min

Technical features
- Line length: 724 m (2,375 ft)
- No. of cables: 2 track cables and 1 haulage rope
- Operating speed: 7.0 m/s
- Vertical Interval: 94 m (308 ft)
- Maximum Gradient: 16°

The Kanzanji Ropeway (かんざんじロープウェイ, Kanzanji Rōpuwei) is a Japanese aerial lift line in Chūō, Hamamatsu, Shizuoka, operated by Entetsu Tourism Development (遠鉄観光開発). The Entetsu Group company also operates hotels, an amusement park Hamanako Palpal (浜名湖パルパル), and Hamanako Musical Box Museum (浜名湖オルゴールミュージアム), all around Kanzanji Onsen (舘山寺温泉) hot spring resort in Lake Hamana (浜名湖). Opened in 1960, the aerial lift links Kanzanji Onsen and Mount Ōkusa, across the northern cove of Lake Hamana.

== Basic data ==
- Cable length: 724 m (2,375 ft)
- Vertical interval: 94 m (308 ft)

== See also ==
- Enshū Railway Line
- List of aerial lifts in Japan
