= Nishi-Kajima Station =

Railway station in Hamamatsu, Japan

Coordinates: 34.846741°N 137.808241°E

Nishikajima Station 西鹿島駅
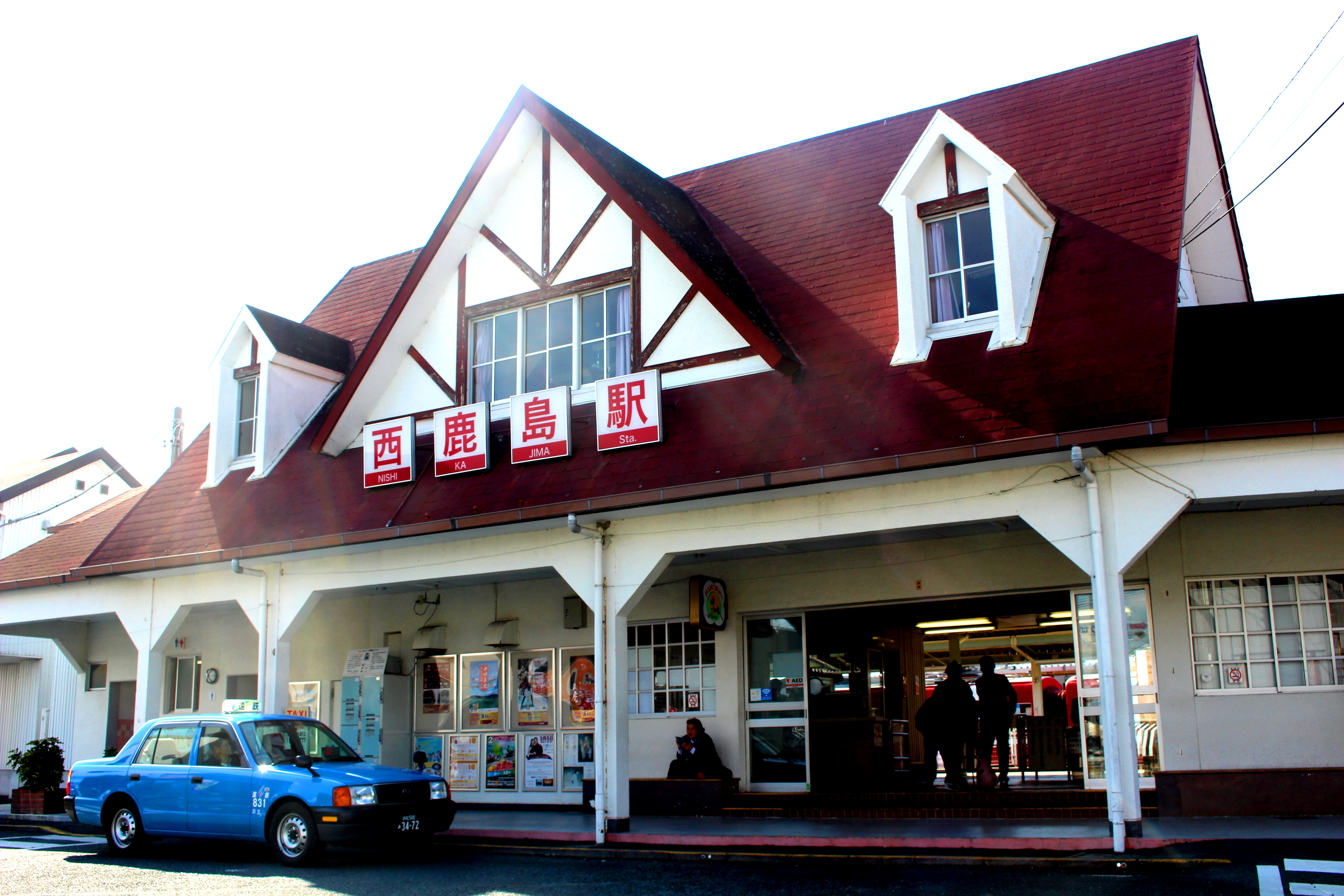
- Nishikajima Station in February 2017

General information
- Location: Nishi-Kashima, Tenryū-ku, Hamamatsu-shi, Shizuoka-ken 431-3312; Japan
- Operator: Enshū Railway; Tenryū Hamanako Railroad
- Lines: ■ Enshū Railway Line; ■ Tenryū Hamanako Line
- Distance: 28.5 kilometers from Kakegawa
- Platforms: 3 side platforms

Other information
- Status: Staffed
- Website: Official website

History
- Opened: December 6, 1909
- Former names: Kashima (to 1923); Enshū-Futamata (to 1938)

Passengers
- FY2017: 1,475 daily (Enshū); 271 (Tenryū)
Location
- Location within Shizuoka Prefecture Location within Japan

Nishikajima Station (西鹿島駅, Nishikajima-eki) is a railway station located in Tenryū-ku, Hamamatsu, Shizuoka Prefecture, Japan, jointly operated by the private railroad company Enshū Railway and by the third sector Tenryū Hamanako Railroad.

== Lines ==
Nishikajima Station is a terminal station for the Enshū Railway Line and is located 17.8 kilometers from the opposing terminus of the line at Shin-Hamamatsu Station. It is also served by the Tenryū Hamanako Line and is 28.5 kilometers from the starting point of the line at Kakegawa Station.

== Station layout ==
The Enshū Railway side of the station has two ground-level opposed side platforms. The Tenryū Hamanako portion of the station has a single side platform, although it previously had a second side platform which was used primarily for freight services. The platforms are connected by an underground passageway. The Enshū Railway portion of the station is staffed; however, the Tenryū Hamanako portion of the station is not.

=== Platforms ===
1, 2	■ Enshū Railway Line	for Hamakita, Shin-Hamamatsu
3	■ Tenryū Hamanako Line	for Tenryū-Futamata, Enshū-Mori, Kakegawa for Mikkabi, Shinjohara

== Adjacent stations ==
«	Service	»
Tenryū Hamanako Line
Futamata-Hommachi	-	Gansuiji
Enshū Railway Line
Enshū-Gansuiji	-	Terminus

== Station history ==
Nishi-Kashima Station opened on December 6, 1909 as the Kashima Station (鹿島駅) on the Nippon-kido (大日本軌道) Kashima Line. In 1943, as part of the wartime nationalization and consolidation of private railways, this line became part of the Enshū Railway Line. On April 1, 1923, the station was renamed Enshū-Futamata Station (遠州二俣駅), and (after nationalization) on March 1, 1938, was moved approximately 400 meters to the south, and given its present name.

On June 1, 1940, JNR's Futamata Line was extended from Enshū-Mori Station to Kanasashi Station, with an intermediate stop at Nishi-Kashima Station. Scheduled freight services were discontinued from June 1970. On March 15, 1987, the station came under the control of the Tenryū Hamanako Line.

== Passenger statistics ==
In fiscal 2017, the Enshū Railway portion of the station was used by an average of 1,475 passengers daily and the Tenryū Hamanako port of the station was used by 272 passengers daily (boarding passengers only).

== Surrounding area ==
- Ministry of Agriculture, Forestry and Fisheries (Japan) Tenryū Forestry Management office

== See also ==
- List of railway stations in Japan
