= Shin-Hamamatsu Station =

Railway station in Hamamatsu, Japan

Shin-Hamamatsu Station 新浜松駅
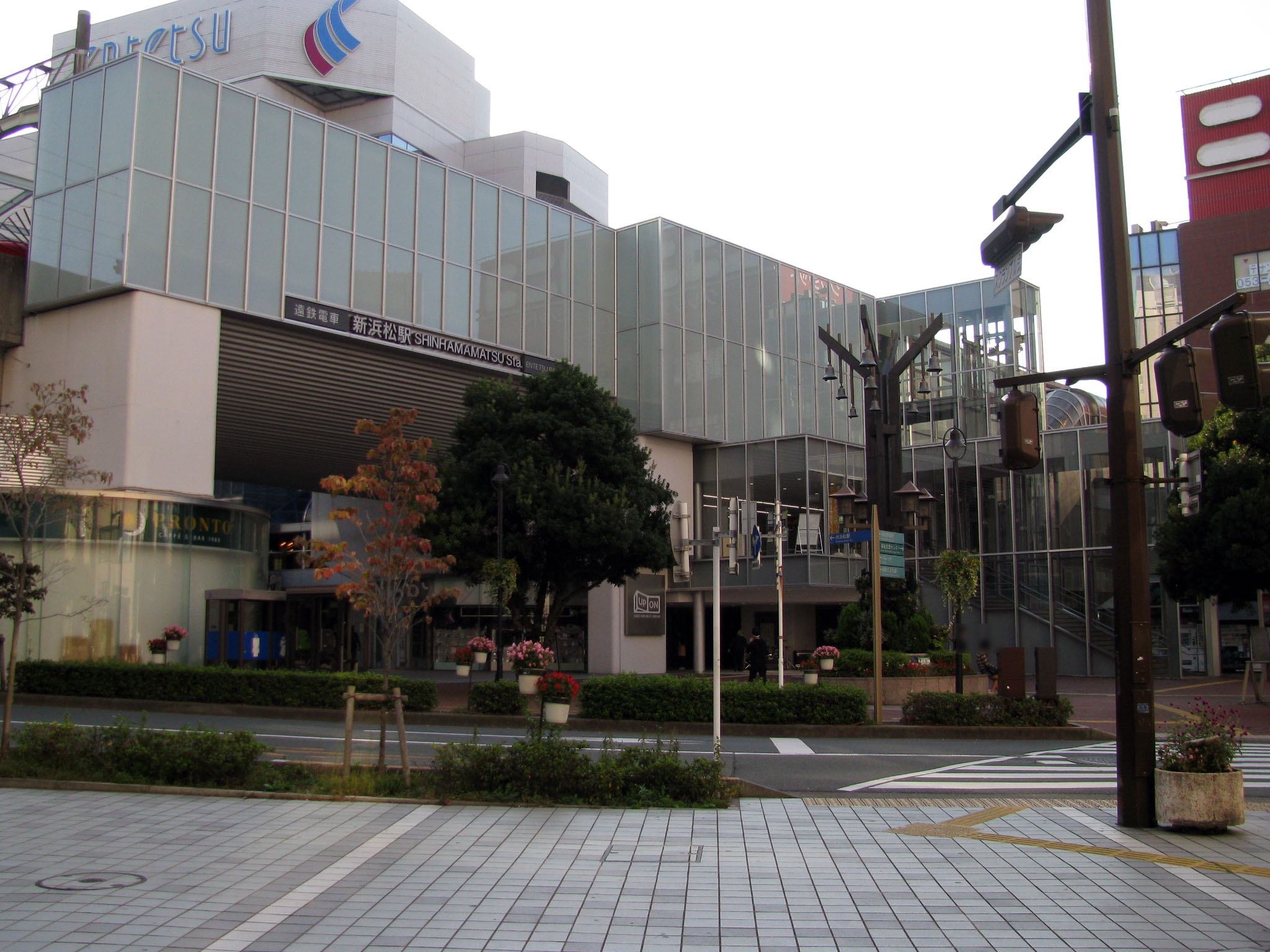
- Shin-Hamamatsu Station

General information
- Location: Kajimachi, Chūō-ku, Hamamatsu-shi, Shizuoka-ken 430-0933; Japan
- Coordinates: 34°42′13.39″N 137°43′56.56″E
- Operator: Enshū Railway
- Line: ■ Enshū Railway Line
- Distance: 17.8 km from Nishi-Kajima
- Platforms: 2 side platforms

Other information
- Status: Staffed

History
- Opened: September 1, 1927
- Former names: Asahimachi (to 1953)

Passengers
- FY2017: 8,075 (daily)
Location
- Location within Shizuoka Prefecture Location within Japan

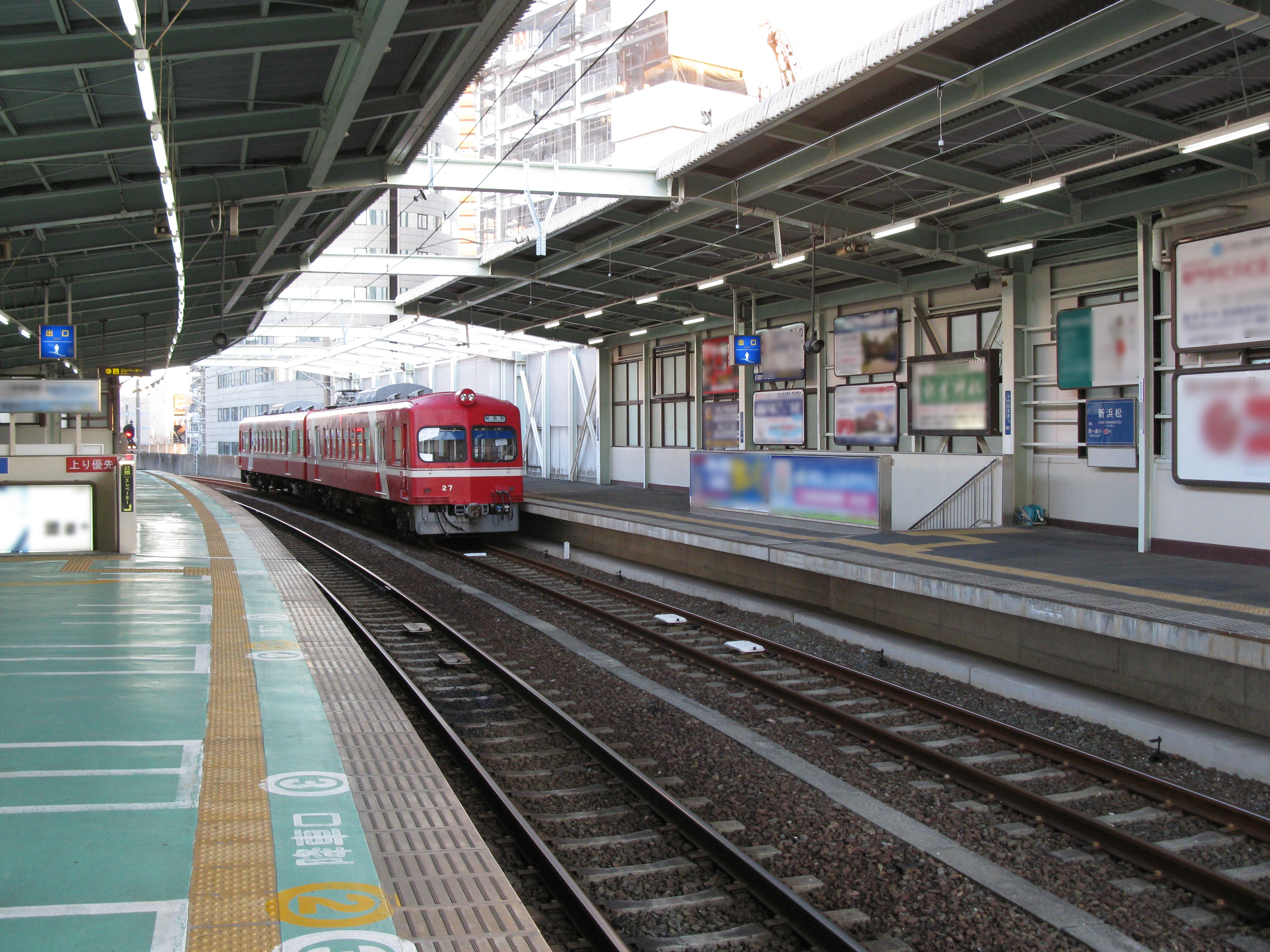
Platforms

Shin-Hamamatsu Station (新浜松駅, Shin-Hamamatsu-eki) is a railway station in Chūō-ku, Hamamatsu, Shizuoka Prefecture, Japan, operated by the private railway company, Enshū Railway.

== Lines ==
Shin-Hamamatsu Station is a terminus of the Enshū Railway Line and is 17.8 kilometers from the opposing terminal of the line at Nishi-Kajima Station.

== Station layout ==
Shin-Hamamatsu Station is an elevated station with two opposed dead-headed side platforms. The station building is a major department store in downtown Hamamatsu. The station building has automated ticket machines, and automated turnstiles, which accept the NicePass smart card, as well as ET Card, a magnetic card ticketing system. The station is staffed.

=== Platforms ===
1	■ Enshū Railway Line	for Hamakita and Nishi-Kajima
2	■ Enshū Railway Line	for Hamakita and Nishi-Kajima

== Adjacent stations ==
«	Service	»
Enshū Railway
Enshū Railway Line
Terminus	-	Daiichidōri

== Station history ==
Shin-Hamamatsu Station was established on September 1, 1927, as Asahimachi Station (旭日町駅, Asahimachi-eki). Its reinforced concrete station building was also the headquarters of the Enshū Railway, and was regarded as one of the most modern buildings in Hamamatsu. It was destroyed during the bombing of Hamamatsu in World War II. The station was rebuilt after the war, and renamed Shin-Hamamatsu in 1953. The tracks were elevated in 1981, and a new station was constructed 100 meters to the northeast, closer to Hamamatsu Station. On the former site now stands the Hamamatsu Meitetsu Hotel. The associated Entetsu Department Store opened within the station building in 1988, and the station was modified to become barrier free in 2004.

== Passenger statistics ==
In fiscal 2017, the station was used by an average of 8,075 passengers daily (boarding passengers only).

== Surrounding area ==
- Hamamatsu Station servicing the Tōkaidō Main Line and Tōkaidō Shinkansen lines is a three-minute walk away.

== See also ==
- List of railway stations in Japan
