= Nice Pass =

Smart card ticketing system used in Hamamatsu, Japan

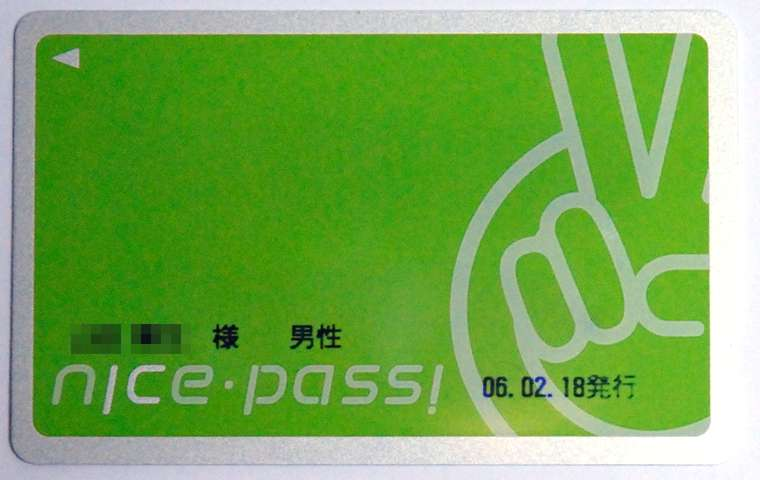
NicePass card

Nice Pass (ナイスパス, Naisupasu) is a rechargeable contactless smart card ticketing system for public transport in Hamamatsu, Japan, introduced by Enshū Railway (Entetsu) group, from August 20, 2004, succeeding the previous ET Card, a magnetic prepaid card. The name is a backronym of New Intelligence Card of Entetsu Personal and Smart System. Just like JR East's Suica or JR West's ICOCA, the card uses RFID technology developed by Sony corporation known as FeliCa. This was the first smart card in Japan that usable on both railway and bus lines.

The card is issued by Enshū Railway and usable on both buses and trains, including the Enshū Railway Line. However, it is not usable on all Hamamatsu community buses, and also cannot be used on Chūbu Centrair International Airport's e-wing bus. There is no current plan for it to be integrated with other nationwide IC cards such as manaca, TOICA, Suica, or ICOCA, or other local cards such as LuLuCa.

== Types of cards ==
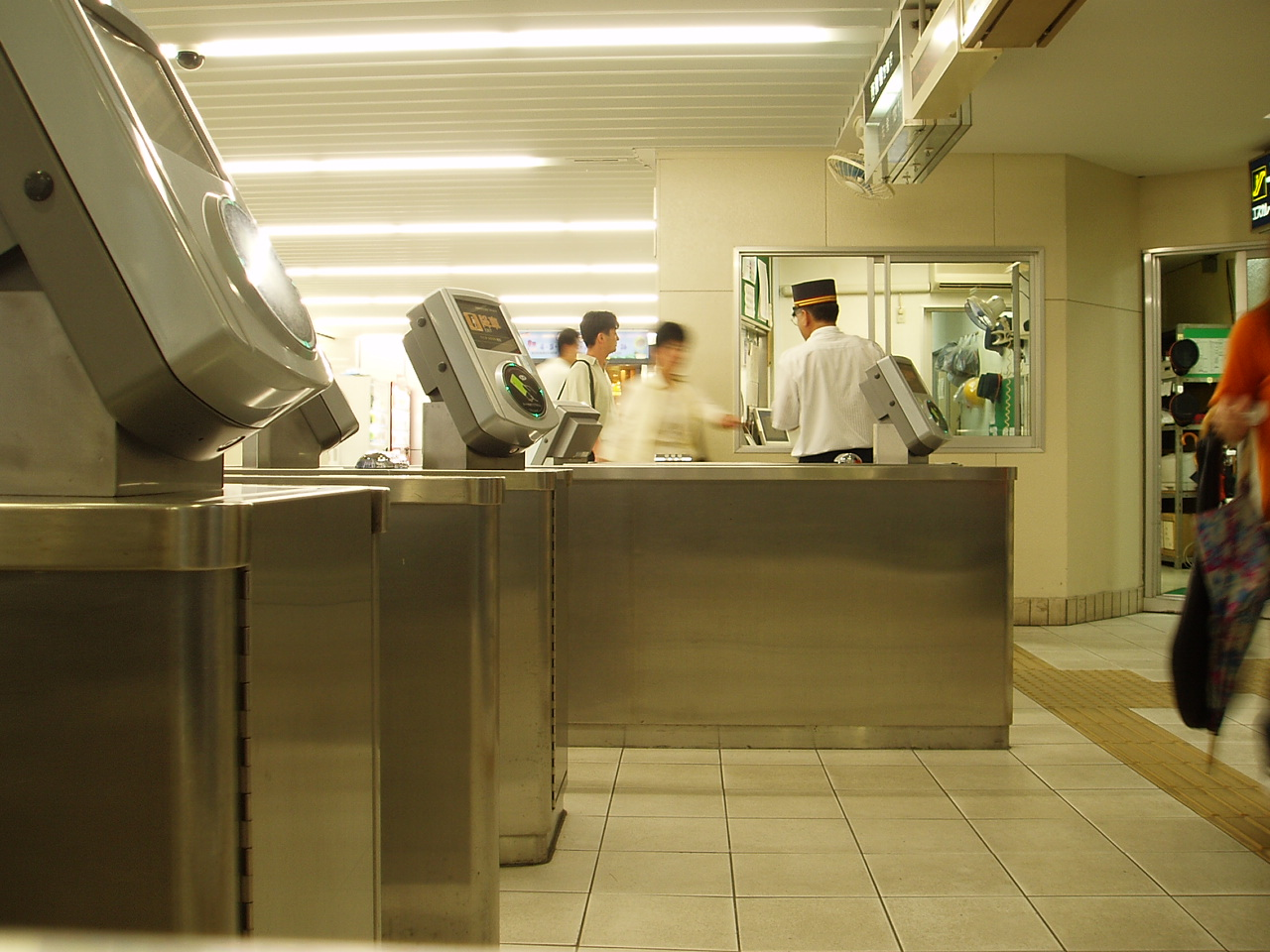
Shin Hamamatsu Station with card readers

- Ordinary card (also supports commuter pass functionality)
- Disabled card (with discounted fares)
- Child's card: For elementary school students or younger
- Student's card: For junior high school students or older
- Elderly customer's card: For customers 65 or older
