= 2024 in Japan =

- Decades: 2000s; 2010s; 2020s; 2030s
- See also: Other events of 2024; History of Japan • Timeline • Years

Events in the year 2024 in Japan.

== Incumbents ==
- Emperor: Naruhito
- Prime Minister
  - Fumio Kishida (Liberal Democratic) (until 1 October)
  - Shigeru Ishiba (Liberal Democratic) (starting 1 October)
- Chief Cabinet Secretary: Yoshimasa Hayashi (Liberal Democratic)
- Chief Justice of the Supreme Court
  - Saburo Tokura (until 16 August)
  - Yukihiko Imasaki (starting 16 August)
- Speaker of the House of Representatives: Fukushiro Nukaga (Liberal Democratic)
- President of the House of Councillors
  - Hidehisa Otsuji (Liberal Democratic) (until 11 November)
  - Masakazu Sekiguchi (Liberal Democratic) (starting 11 November)

=== Governors ===
- Aichi Prefecture: Hideaki Omura
- Akita Prefecture: Norihisa Satake
- Aomori Prefecture: Sōichirō Miyashita
- Chiba Prefecture: Toshihito Kumagai
- Ehime Prefecture: Tokihiro Nakamura
- Fukui Prefecture: Tatsuji Sugimoto
- Fukuoka Prefecture: Seitaro Hattori
- Fukushima Prefecture: Masao Uchibori
- Gifu Prefecture: Hajime Furuta
- Gunma Prefecture: Ichita Yamamoto
- Hiroshima Prefecture: Hidehiko Yuzaki
- Hokkaido: Naomichi Suzuki
- Hyōgo Prefecture: Motohiko Saitō
- Ibaraki Prefecture: Kazuhiko Ōigawa
- Ishikawa: Masanori Tanimoto
- Iwate Prefecture: Takuya Tasso
- Kagawa Prefecture: Keizō Hamada
- Kagoshima Prefecture: Kōichi Shiota
- Kanagawa Prefecture: Yuji Kuroiwa
- Kumamoto Prefecture: Ikuo Kabashima
- Kochi Prefecture: Seiji Hamada
- Kyoto Prefecture: Takatoshi Nishiwaki
- Mie Prefecture: Eikei Suzuki
- Miyagi Prefecture: Yoshihiro Murai
- Miyazaki Prefecture: Shunji Kōno
- Nagano Prefecture: Shuichi Abe
- Nagasaki Prefecture: Hōdō Nakamura
- Nara Prefecture: Makoto Yamashita
- Niigata Prefecture: Hideyo Hanazumi
- Oita Prefecture: Kiichiro Sato
- Okayama Prefecture: Ryuta Ibaragi
- Okinawa Prefecture: Denny Tamaki
- Osaka Prefecture: Hirofumi Yoshimura
- Saga Prefecture: Yoshinori Yamaguchi
- Saitama Prefecture: Motohiro Ōno
- Shiga Prefecture: Taizō Mikazuki
- Shimame Prefecture: Tatsuya Maruyama
- Shizuoka Prefecture: Yasutomo Suzuki
- Tochigi Prefecture: Tomikazu Fukuda
- Tokushima Prefecture: Masazumi Gotoda
- Tokyo Prefecture: Yuriko Koike
- Tottori Prefecture: Shinji Hirai
- Toyama Prefecture: Hachiro Nitta
- Wakayama Prefecture: Shūhei Kishimoto
- Yamagata Prefecture: Mieko Yoshimura
- Yamaguchi Prefecture: Tsugumasa Muraoka
- Yamanashi Prefecture: Kotaro Nagasaki

== Arts and entertainment ==
- 2024 in anime
- 2024 in Japanese music
- 2024 in Japanese television
- List of 2024 box office number-one films in Japan
- List of Japanese films of 2024

== Events ==
=== January ===
- January 1 –
  - Six wards in Hamamatsu, Shizuoka Prefecture, including Naka-ku, Minami-ku, Higashi-ku, Nishi-ku, and Kita-ku, are disestablished and replaced by two new wards, namely Hamana-ku and Chūō-ku.
  - A 7.5 magnitude earthquake strikes Ishikawa Prefecture, killing 241 people.
- January 2 – 2024 Haneda Airport runway collision: A Japan Airlines Airbus A350-900 collides with a Japan Coast Guard DHC-8 aircraft and bursts into flames at Tokyo's Haneda Airport. The Coast guard plane was going to deliver aid to those affected by the earthquake in Ishikawa Prefecture the day before. All 379 occupants aboard the Japan Airlines flight are evacuated, while five of the six occupants aboard the Coast Guard aircraft are killed.
- January 3 – Three men are stabbed on a train at Akihabara Station, Tokyo. A woman is arrested by police.
- January 19 –
  - Japan becomes the fifth country to successfully land on the surface of the moon with the SLIM lunar lander mission.
  - 2023–2024 Japanese slush fund scandal: Several Liberal Democratic Party lawmakers are indicted in a scandal involving misuse of campaign funds, including incumbent lawmakers Yasutada Ōno and Yaichi Tanigawa, both of whom resign from the party following their indictments. The Seiwa Seisaku Kenkyūkai, Kōchikai, and Shisuikai factions of the Liberal Democratic Party all announce their intention to dissolve as a result of the scandal.
- January 23 – Two railway workers are injured after being electrocuted while trying to fix a massive power outage that shuts down the Shinkansen system in a section operated by JR East between Omiya Station in Saitama and Ueno Station in Tokyo. A train is also damaged during the outage.
- January 24 – Ukrainian-born Karolina Shiino is announced as the winner of the 2024 Miss Nippon Grand Prix beauty pageant. She is the first naturalised Japanese citizen to win the pageant. Her win sparks debates over "Japaneseness" and the shifting demographics of Japan.
- January 25 – Kyoto Animation arson attack: A court sentences Shinji Aoba to death for a 2019 arson attack on a Kyoto Animation studio in Fushimi-ku, Kyoto, which killed 36 people.
- January 26 – 1974 Mitsubishi Heavy Industries bombing: Police announce they have arrested who they believe to be Satoshi Kirishima, a member of East Asia Anti-Japan Armed Front who has been a fugitive from justice for 50 years for his role in a series of bombings of companies.
- January 29 – The man believed to be Satoshi Kirishima dies. DNA comparison with relatives further confirms his identity as Kirishima.

=== February ===
- February 5 – Ukrainian-born Karolina Shiino relinquishes her crown as winner of the 2024 Miss Nippon Grand Prix beauty pageant after news emerges of her having an affair with a married man.
- February 27 – Sony announces it will cut 900 jobs across its global workforce and proposes the closure of London Studio as part of the restructuring.

=== March ===
- March 4 – The Nikkei 225 reaches 40,000 points for the first time.
- March 11 – Two New Zealand skiers are killed and another is injured following an avalanche on Mount Yotei in Hokkaido.
- March 12 – A court in Fukuoka overturns the death sentence of Yakuza Kudo-kai leader Satoru Nomura imposed for a 1998 murder and sentences him to life in prison.
- March 13 –
  - KAIROS-1, designed by Space One as Japan's first privately manufactured rocket, explodes seconds after its maiden launch from Kushimoto, Wakayama Prefecture.
  - The Fuji-Q Highland amusement park announces the removal of the famed high-speed roller coaster Do-Dodonpa, which had been closed since August 2021 following numerous incidents resulting in injuries within a year.
  - The Tokyo District Court orders the government to return the remains of Aum Shinrikyo leader Shoko Asahara, who was executed in 2018 for the Tokyo subway attack in 1995, to his family.
- March 14 –
  - In separate lawsuits, the Sapporo High Court and the Tokyo District Court rule that the non-recognition of same-sex marriage in Japan is unconstitutional.
  - The Tokyo District Court convicts former State Minister of Justice Mito Kakizawa of vote-buying worth 2.8 million yen ($19,000) during mayoral elections in the Kōtō ward of Tokyo in April 2023 and sentences him to a two-year suspended sentence.
  - The Tokyo District Court convicts former Member of the House of Councillors and YouTuber GaaSyy of online harassment and sentences him to a three-year suspended sentence.
- March 16 – The Hokuriku Shinkansen railway extension from Kanazawa to Tsuruga, Fukui is completed.
- March 20 –
  - The South Korean-flagged tanker Keoyoung Sun capsizes off the coast of Yamaguchi Prefecture during stormy weather. Nine crew members are found dead, while one person remains missing. Two people are rescued.
  - Aiko, Princess Toshi (only child of Emperor Naruhito and Empress Masako) graduates from Gakushuin University.
- March 26 – The Kishida Cabinet allows the sale and export of fighter aircraft to other countries.
- March 29 – North Korean state media cites foreign minister Choe Son Hui as saying that North Korea rejects any talks with Japan on any issue, including Japanese abductees, after Prime Minister Fumio Kishida said he was willing to meet in person with leader Kim Jong Un.
- March 30 – Kobayashi red yeast rice scandal: Authorities raid a facility of Kobayashi Pharmaceutical Company in Osaka after five deaths from kidney failure are linked to consumption of its health supplements containing the red mold benikoji.

=== April ===
- April 1 –
  - A magnitude 6.0 earthquake strikes Iwate Prefecture, injuring two people.
  - The Imperial House of Japan opens an account on Instagram for the first time.
  - Aiko, Princess Toshi joins the Japanese Red Cross Society as a full-time contract employee.
- April 2 – The governor of Shizuoka Prefecture, Heita Kawakatsu, announces his resignation following uproar over comments he made the previous day comparing civil servants with other professions.
- April 3 – A magnitude 7.4 earthquake strikes off the coast of Taiwan, prompting tsunami warnings for Okinawa Prefecture in Japan. A 30-cm tsunami is observed at Yonaguni Island and Miyako Island while a 20-cm tsunami reaches Ishigaki Island.
- April 15 – Nearly 60,000 residents of Naha are ordered evacuated due to risks of landslides caused by heavy rains.
- April 17 – A magnitude 6.6 earthquake strikes along the Bungo Channel between Shikoku and Kyushu, injuring 12 people.
- April 20 – Two SH-60K helicopters of the Japan Maritime Self-Defense Forces crash into the Pacific Ocean following a possible collision during a training exercise near Torishima Island, killing eight people.
- April 23 – A spring imperial garden party is held at Akasaka Estate, during which Aiko, Princess Toshi makes her debut.
- April 25 – Hiroyuki Miyazawa resigns as a member of the House of Representatives after reports emerge of him having an extra-marital affair.
- April 28 – By-elections are held for three seats in the House of Representatives (Tokyo 15th, Shimane 1st and Nagasaki 3rd districts), which are all won by the Constitutional Democratic Party.

=== May ===
- May 14 – Three people are killed and two others are injured in an accident involving seven vehicles along the Metropolitan Expressway in Toda, Saitama Prefecture.
- May 17 –
  - The National Diet approves a bill seeking to allow joint child custody for divorced couples.
  - Three members of the Japan Wings Party (Tsubasa no tō), including a candidate of the House of Representatives by-election on April 28 are arrested on suspicion of disrupting other candidates' campaign rallies.
- May 23 – Four people, including three children are found dead in suspicious circumstances following a house fire in Shinagawa, Tokyo.
- May 24 – A probation officer is killed in Otsu, in what is suspected to be the first of its kind by their charge in Japan since 1964.
- May 26 – 2024 Shizuoka Prefecture gubernatorial election: Former Hamamatsu mayor and opposition-backed candidate Yasutomo Suzuki is elected governor.
- May 30 – A member of the Japan Self-Defense Forces is killed by an exploding grenade during a training accident at the Kitafuji training ground in Yamanashi Prefecture.

=== June ===
- 3 June – A magnitude 5.8 earthquake hits Ishikawa Prefecture, injuring two people and destroying five houses.
- 4 June – Authorities raid the headquarters of Toyota as part of an investigation into data manipulation during safety certification tests.
- 6 June – Seven workers are injured following an explosion at a shipyard in Nishinari-ku, Osaka.
- 7 June – Four buildings are destroyed in a fire in Yokohama Chinatown.
- 8 June – Kadokawa Corporation and the video-streaming platform Niconico suffer a ransomware cyberattack by a hacker group called BlackSuit.
- 10 June – The government allows the deportation of asylum seekers whose applications have been rejected multiple times.
- 14 June – Yayoi Kimura, the former mayor of Kōtō, Tokyo is given a suspended 1.5 year prison sentence for vote-buying by the Tokyo District Court.
- 20 June –
  - A no-confidence motion against the Kishida Cabinet filed by the Constitutional Democratic Party of Japan is defeated in the House of Representatives.
  - The Ministry of Foreign Affairs announces sanctions on firms based in China, India, Kazakhstan, and Uzbekistan, for their alleged support to Russia in the Russo–Ukrainian war.
- 28 June –
  - Thousands protest at the U.S. Embassy in Tokyo over multiple alleged sexual assault cases involving U.S. servicemembers against residents of Okinawa Island.
  - The Japanese government officially ends the usage of floppy disks in its transactions.

=== July ===
- 2 July – Kobayashi red yeast rice scandal: 76 more deaths and at least 500 hospitalizations in Japan are linked to use of red yeast rice supplements distributed by Kobayashi Pharmaceutical, causing kidney disease and other severe conditions.
- 3 July –
  - The Supreme Court of Japan rules that a defunct eugenics law that led to the forced sterilization of 24,500 people from 1948 to 1996 is unconstitutional. The court also invalidates a 20-year statute of limitations for complaints relating to the law.
  - New 1,000, 5,000, and 10,000 yen banknote design is issued by the Bank of Japan.
- 7 July – 2024 Tokyo gubernatorial election: Incumbent Yuriko Koike is reelected as Governor of Tokyo.
- 8 July – Japan and the Philippines sign a defense pact which allows the deployment of Japanese forces to the Philippines for military exercises.
- 12 July – Three people are killed in a landslide in Matsuyama.
- 16 July – A man sets himself on fire at the city hall of Takahama, Aichi Prefecture, injuring himself and three city employees.
- 17 July – Prime Minister Fumio Kishida formally apologizes to 130 victims of forced sterilization under the Eugenics Protection Law which was declared unconstitutional on July 3, and approves compensation measures for more than 25,000 affected victims and their relatives which are passed into law on 8 October.
- 19 July – Ryo Sakai resigns as Chief of Staff of the Japan Maritime Self-Defense Force following criticism over a series of scandals in the service. He is replaced in his position by Akira Saito.
- 23 July – The Japanese government imposes sanctions on illegal Israeli settlers in the West Bank for the first time in response to violence against Palestinians.
- July 26–August 11 – Japan at the 2024 Summer Olympics: The Japanese Olympic delegation wins 20 gold, 12 silver, and 13 bronze medals and places third out of 84 countries competing at the 2024 Summer Olympics in Paris.
- 27 July – The Sado mine is designated as a World Heritage Site by UNESCO.
- 28 July – Three people are reported killed in Yamagata and Akita Prefectures following days of flooding caused by heavy rains.
- 29 July – One person is reported dead and 147 others are sickened following an outbreak of Staphylococcus aureus linked to contaminated roasted unagi being sold at the Keikyu Department Store in Yokohama.

=== August ===
- 3 August – 2024 Japan heatwaves: The Japan Meteorological Agency issues excessive heat warnings for 37 of 47 prefectures amid heat waves that have killed at least 59 people from heat stroke since April. At least 123 people, many of whom were elderly, are subsequently reported to have died from heat illnesses in the Greater Tokyo Area alone in July, according to Ministory of Health, Labour and Welfare, official confirmed report on September 2025, 2,166 persons were heatwave relatively death from June to September.
- 5 August –
  - The Nikkei 225 stock market index falls by over 12%, suffering its worst two-day decline in history and its largest daily percent drop since Black Monday in October 1987.
  - Kadokawa's official website and the video-sharing platform Niconico go back online after a two-month shutdown due to the ransomware attack on June 8. The result of an investigation released on the same day confirms that the attack leaked 254,241 user data.
- 6 August –
  - Whaling company Kyodo Senpaku announces the country's first fin whale kill in fifty years off the coast of Iwate Prefecture.
  - The Nikkei 225 stock market index rises more than 10%, a day after declining by more than 12%.
- 7 August – The US and British ambassadors to Japan announce their intent to boycott ceremonies marking the 79th anniversary of the Atomic bombing of Nagasaki following a decision by mayor Shiro Suzuki not to invite Israeli ambassador Gilad Cohen due to concerns over protests against the war in Gaza.
- 8 August –
  - A magnitude 7.1 earthquake strikes off the coast of Miyazaki Prefecture, injuring at least five people and causing a 0.5 meter tsunami. The earthquake prompts the Japan Meteorological Agency to issue a 'Nankai Trough Earthquake Extra Information' advisory that a probability of a megathrust earthquake along the Nankai Trough was now "relatively higher" in the first advisory of its kind but clarifies that it was not imminent. The warning is lifted on 15 August with no major seismic activity recorded.
  - Kobayashi red yeast rice scandal: The Kobayashi Pharmaceutical Company announces that it would discontinue the production of benikoji supplements.
- 14 August – Prime Minister Kishida withdraws his candidacy for re-election in the Liberal Democratic Party leadership election scheduled in September, which would also end his premiership.
- 15 August – Megumi Hirose resigns as a member of the House of Councillors from Iwate Prefecture following a scandal over alleged salary fraud involving a secretary with no duties.
- 16 August – Thousands of people are ordered to evacuate in northern Japan as Typhoon Ampil approaches the country.
- 20 August – Tomiko Itooka, a 116-year old resident of Ashiya, Hyōgo Prefecture, becomes the world's oldest known living person.
- 26 August – Japan announces the first incursion into its airspace of Chinese military aircraft after a Shaanxi Y-9 surveillance plane flies over the Danjo Islands in Nagasaki Prefecture for two minutes.
- 27 August – Three people are killed following a landslide in Gamagori, Aichi Prefecture amid extreme weather caused by Typhoon Shanshan.
- 28 August – Manabu Horii resigns as a member of the House of Representatives from Hokkaido following a scandal over his giving out condolence money to constituents for funerals he did not personally attend in violation of election laws.
- 29–31 August – Hundreds of flights are cancelled and the Japan Meteorological Agency issues an alert in Kagoshima Prefecture as Typhoon Shanshan makes landfall over the area. At least six people are reported killed, with over 100 people injured.

=== September ===
- 5 September – Belarus announces the arrest in July of a Japanese national on suspicion of spying on vital installations along the border with Ukraine on behalf of Japanese intelligence services.
- 6 September - Prince Hisahito of Akishino, second in line to the Japanese throne (Emperor Naruhito's nephew), turns 18-years-old and come of age.
- 17 September – Yoshihiro Hidaka, the president of Yamaha Motor Company, is injured after being stabbed, allegedly by his daughter, at their residence in Iwata, Shizuoka.
- 18 September – Seiichi Katsurada, the CEO of Shiretoko Pleasure Cruise, is arrested on charges related to the sinking of the company vessel Kazu I in 2022 which killed all 26 people on board.
- 19 September – The Tōhoku Shinkansen suffers a decoupling incident involving the Hayabusa and Komachi trains, causing a suspension of services along the entire line.
- 21–23 September – Seven people are killed and six others are reported missing following floods and landslides caused by heavy rains in Ishikawa Prefecture.
- 21 September – The 2024 World Rugby Pacific Nations Cup final is held in Osaka, with Japan losing 17–41 to titleholders Fiji.
- 22 September – Japan loses 0–1 to North Korea in the 2024 FIFA U-20 Women's World Cup final in Bogotá, Colombia.
- 23 September –
  - 2024 Constitutional Democratic Party of Japan presidential election: Former prime minister Yoshihiko Noda is elected as leader of the Constitutional Democratic Party of Japan, defeating three other candidates including former Chief Cabinet Secretary Yukio Edano by 232 points to 180.
  - Japanese fighter jets fire warning flares for the first time at a Russian military aircraft after it violated Japan's airspace.
- 25 September – The Japan Maritime Self-Defense Force sends the warship JS Sazanami into the Taiwan Strait for the first time to reportedly "convey a message" to China.
- 26 September – Iwao Hakamada, the world's longest-serving death row inmate, who has waited his potential execution since 1968, is acquitted by a court in Shizuoka after a retrial for four murders.
- 27 September – 2024 Liberal Democratic Party (Japan) presidential election. Former defence minister Shigeru Ishiba defeats eight other candidates to become leader of the Liberal Democratic Party of Japan.
- 30 September –
  - Incoming prime minister Shigeru Ishiba calls for a snap general election to be held on 27 October 2024.
  - Motohiko Saitō resigns as governor of Hyogo Prefecture amid allegations of abuse of power.

=== October ===
- 1 October – Shigeru Ishiba is sworn in as the 102nd prime minister of Japan and the Ishiba Cabinet is formed.
- 2 October –
  - The Nintendo Museum, the first museum dedicated to the history of Nintendo opens in Uji, Kyoto.
  - A bomb that was dropped during World War II explodes on a taxiway at Miyazaki Airport, cancelling more than 80 flights.
- 6 October – Tarcisio Isao Kikuchi, the Archbishop of Tokyo, is named a cardinal by Pope Francis, with his elevation to the College of Cardinals scheduled on December 8.
- 9 October – Prime Minister Ishiba dissolves the House of Representatives.
- 11 October – Nihon Hidankyo, a group established by hibakusha, is awarded the Nobel Peace Prize for their campaign against nuclear weapons that has "contributed greatly to the establishment of the nuclear taboo".
- 17 October – A bird flu outbreak is reported at a farm in Atsuma, Hokkaido, prompting the culling of 19,000 poultry.
- 19 October – A man is arrested after throwing incendiary devices at the headquarters of the Liberal Democratic Party in Tokyo and ramming his vehicle into a fence outside the Prime Minister's Office.
- 27 October – 2024 Japanese general election: The LDP loses its parliamentary majority for the first time since 2009.
- 28 October – Olympus Corporation CEO Stefan Kaufmann resigns following allegations of him purchasing illegal drugs.
- 30 October – The Tokyo High Court rules that the non-recognition of same-sex marriage in Japan is unconstitutional and discriminatory.

=== November ===
- 6 November – The winter snowcap on Mount Fuji makes its latest-occurring formation since records began in 1894.
- 9 November – Tetsuo Saito becomes leader of Komeito following an extraordinary party convention to replace Keiichi Ishii, who lost his parliamentary seat in the general election.
- 10 November – The Japan Maritime Self-Defense Force minesweeper Ukushima catches fire and sinks off the coast of Ōshima, Fukuoka, leaving one crew member missing.
- 11 November – Shigeru Ishiba is reelected as prime minister during an extraordinary session of the Diet, defeating Yoshihiko Noda and Second Ishiba Cabinet is formed as the minority government.
- 13 November – The Nuclear Regulation Authority disqualifies the Number 2 reactor of the Tsuruga Nuclear Power Plant from restarting operations, citing the possible existence of active fault lines in its vicinity.
- 16 November – A train operated by JR Freight derails near Hakodate, causing disruptions to train services in Hokkaido.
- 17 November –
  - A pleasure boat sinks after colliding with a tugboat in the Seto Inland Sea off the coast of Kudamatsu, Yamaguchi Prefecture, killing three people.
  - 2024 Hyо̄go gubernatorial election: Motohiko Saitō is elected to a new term as governor of Hyogo Prefecture after being removed in September amid accusations of misconduct.
- 22 November – Etsuro Sotoo becomes the first person from Japan to win the Ratzinger Prize for his contributions to the construction of the Sagrada Família church in Barcelona, Spain.

=== December ===
- 1 December – Osaka Prefecture governor Hirofumi Yoshimura is elected leader of the Japan Innovation Party.
- 4 December –
  - Yuichiro Tamaki is suspended as leader of the Democratic Party for the People until 3 March 2025 amid controversy over his entering into an extramarital affair. He is replaced by Motohisa Furukawa.
  - Sake is recognized by UNESCO as an Intangible cultural heritage.
- 12 December – A law criminalizing the usage of cannabis and tetrahydrocannabinol comes into effect.
- 13 December –The Fukuoka High Court rules that the non-recognition of same-sex marriage in Japan is unconstitutional and violates the right to pursue happiness.

== Sports ==
- March 30 – 2023–24 Formula E World Championship is held at 2024 Tokyo ePrix
- April 7 – 2024 Formula One World Championship is held at 2024 Japanese Grand Prix
- May 17–25 - 2024 World Para Athletics Championships was held at Kobe Universiade Memorial Stadium
- October 6 – 2024 MotoGP World Championship is held at 2024 Japanese motorcycle Grand Prix
- 2024 Nippon Professional Baseball season
- 2024 in sumo
- 2024 F4 Japanese Championship
- 2024 Super Formula Championship
- 2024 Super Formula Lights
- 2024 Super GT Series
- 2024 in Japanese football
- 2024 J1 League
- 2024 J2 League
- 2024 J3 League
- 2024 Japan Football League
- 2024 Japanese Regional Leagues
- 2024 Japanese Super Cup
- 2024 Emperor's Cup
- 2024 J.League Cup

== Deaths ==
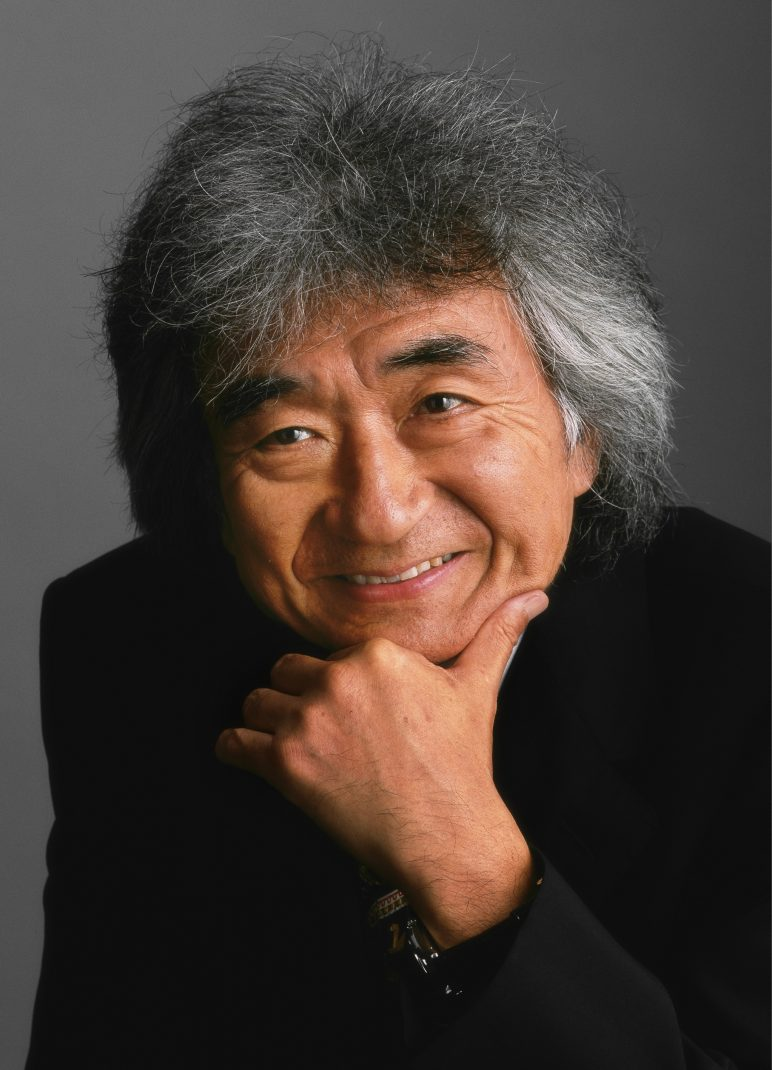
Seiji Ozawa, Japanese composer and conductor, has died of heart failure at the age of 88.

=== January ===
- January 3 – Kunihiko Muroi, politician (b. 1947)
- January 4:
  - Kishin Shinoyama, photographer (b. 1940)
  - Tomonobu Yokoyama, footballer (b. 1985)
- January 12:
  - Jiro Hirano, news anchor (b. 1940)
  - Haruo Takahashi, animator and manga creator (b. 1947)
- January 14:
  - Yuichi Ogawa, politician (b. 1946)
  - Makoto Taniguchi, diplomat and academic (b. 1930)
- January 16 – Esper Itō, comedian (b. 1960)
- January 19 – Toru Kawashima, footballer (b. 1970)
- January 22:
  - Takashi Ezure, screenwriter (b. 1941)
  - Motohisa Ikeda, politician (b. 1940)
- January 27 – Susumu Taira, actor (b. 1934)
- January 28 – Satoshi Kirishima, terrorist (b. 1954)
- January 29 – Hinako Ashihara, manga author (b. 1974)

=== February ===
- 4 February – Yōko Abe, calligrapher (b. 1928).
- 5 February – Tsutomu Hanahara, wrestler, Olympic champion (1964) (b. 1940).
- 6 February – Seiji Ozawa, conductor (b. 1935)
- 7 February – Ryōko Akamatsu, politician (b. 1929)
- 12 February – Hirotake Yano, businessman (b. 1943)
- 20 February – Yoko Yamamoto, actress (b. 1942)
- 23 February – Giichi Tsunoda, politician (b. 1937)

=== March ===
- 1 March – Akira Toriyama, manga artist (b. 1955)
- 4 March – Tarako, voice actress (b. 1960)
- 10 March – Yutaka Yoshie, professional wrestler (b. 1974)
- 14 March – Minori Terada, actor (b. 1942)
- 18 March – Kenjiro Shinozuka, rally driver (b. 1948)
- 21 March – Hideki Seo, fashion designer (b. 1974)
- 29 March – Kenji Suzuki, freelancer journalist and television announcer of NHK (b. 1929)
- 30 March – Yukiko Kato, author (b. 1936)

=== April ===
- April – Akebono Tarō, sumo wrestler (b. 1969)
- 11 April – Yasuo Muramatsu, voice actor (b. 1933)
- 15 April - Reita, bassist (b. 1981)
- 18 April – Keiko Yamamoto, voice actress (b. 1943)
- 21 April – Ingrid Fuzjko Hemming, pianist (b. 1932)
- 23 April – Yukio Kasaya, ski jumper (b. 1943)
- 26 April – Yumi Katsura, wedding fashion designer (b. 1930)

=== May ===
- 4 May – Jūrō Kara, playwright (b. 1940)
- 16 May – Akira Nakao, actor (b. 1942)
- 17 May – Hideyuki Umezu, voice actor (b. 1955)
- 20 May – Eiko Masuyama, voice actress (b. 1936)
- 24 May – Kabosu, Shiba Inu dog and Internet meme (Doge). (b. 2006)
- 31 May – Yuka Motohashi, actress (b. 1978)

=== June ===
- 9 June – Yoshiko Kuga, actress (b. 1931)
- 14 June – Kazuko Shiraishi, poet (b. 1931)
- 19 June – Katsue Miwa, voice actress (b. 1943)
- 26 June – Taiki Matsuno, voice actor (b. 1967)

=== July ===
- 6 July – Kimurayama Mamoru, sumo wrestler (b. 1981)
- 12 July – Noriko Ohara, voice actress (b. 1935)
- 20 July – Tsutomu Shirosaki, Japanese Red Army militant (b. 1952)
- 30 July – Junro Anan, baseball player (b. 1937)

=== August ===
- 12 August – Seigo Matsuoka, writer (b. 1944)
- 13 August – Mari Igata, pioneering motorcycle racer (b. 1958)
- 20 August – Atsuko Tanaka, voice actress (b. 1962)

=== September ===
- 3 September – Peeco, fashion critic (b. 1945)
- 8 September – Emi Shinohara, voice actress (b. 1963)
- 20 September – Sayuri, musician, singer, songwriter (b. 1996)
- 29 September – Nobuyo Ōyama, voice actress (b. 1933)

=== October ===
- 4 October – Yukio Hattori, culinary researcher (b. 1945)
- 14 October – Keizō Murase, suitmaker (b. 1935)
- 17 October – Toshiyuki Nishida, actor (b. 1947)
- 22 October – Asahikuni Masuo, sumo wrestler (b. 1947)
- 28 October – Kazuo Umezu, manga artist (b. 1936)

=== November ===
- 12 November:
  - Kitanofuji Katsuaki, sumo wrestler (b. 1942)
  - Naoyuki Agawa, academic (b. 1951)
- 13 November – Shuntarō Tanikawa, poet (b. 1931)
- 14 November – Shōhei Hino, actor (b. 1949)
- 15 November – Yuriko, Princess Mikasa, royal (b. 1923)
- 18 November – Junko Hori, voice actress (b. 1935)

=== December ===
- 6 December – Miho Nakayama, singer, actress (b. 1970)
- 11 December – Michio Mamiya, composer (b. 1929).
- 19 December – Tsuneo Watanabe, journalist and publisher (Yomiuri Shimbun), (b. 1926).
- 25 December – Osamu Suzuki, automotive industry executive, president (1978–2000) and chairman (2000–2021) of Suzuki (b. 1930).
- 26 December - Chisako Kakehi, serial killer (b. 1946).
- 29 December - Tomiko Itooka, oldest person in the world (b. 1908).

== See also ==
=== Country overviews ===
- Japan
- History of Japan
- Outline of Japan
- Government of Japan
- Politics of Japan
- Years in Japan
- Timeline of Japanese history

=== Related timelines for current period ===
- 2024
- 2020s
- 2020s in political history
