= List of districts of the House of Representatives of Japan =

Districts of the House of Representatives

As of 2024, the House of Representatives of Japan is elected from a combination of multi-member districts and single-member districts, a method called parallel voting. Currently, 176 members are elected from 11 multi-member districts (called proportional representation blocks or PR blocks) by a party-list system of proportional representation (PR), and 289 members are elected from single-member districts, for a total of 465. 233 seats are therefore required for a majority. Each PR block consists of one or more prefectures, and each prefecture is divided into one or more single-member districts. In general, the block districts correspond loosely to the major regions of Japan, with some of the larger regions (such as Kantō) subdivided.

== History ==
Until the 1993 general election, all members of the House of Representatives were elected in multi-member constituencies by single non-transferable vote. In 1994, Parliament passed an electoral reform bill that introduced the current system of parallel voting in single-member constituencies and proportional voting blocks. The original draft bill in 1993 by the anti-LDP coalition of Prime Minister Morihiro Hosokawa included proportional party list voting on a national scale, an equal number of proportional and district seats (250 each) and the possibility of split voting. However, the bill stalled in the House of Councillors. After the Liberal Democratic Party (LDP) had returned to power later that year, it was changed to include proportional voting in regional blocks only, the number of proportional seats was reduced, but the possibility to cast two separate votes was kept in the bill. The electoral reform law was finally passed in 1994. It was first applied in the 1996 general election.

== Redistricting and reapportionment ==
Amendments to the electoral law in 2002 and 2013 changed the boundaries of single-member districts and reapportioned seats between prefectures (+5/-5 in 2002; +0/-5 in 2013, resulting in a net change of -5 in district seats in the House of Representatives to 295 and overall seats to 475). The borders of the regional proportional blocks have never changed, but the apportionment of seats to the regional proportional blocks changed in 2000 after the number of proportional seats had been reduced from 200 to 180 (reducing the total number of seats in the lower house from 500 to 480), and in the 2002 reapportionment.

Another reapportionment was passed by the National Diet in June 2017. In the majoritarian segment, it will change 97 districts in 19 prefectures, six are eliminated without replacement (one each in Aomori, Iwate, Mie, Nara, Kumamoto and Kagoshima). In the proportional segment, four "blocks" lose a seat each (Tōhoku, N. Kantō, Kinki, Kyūshū). Thus, the number of majoritarian seats is reduced to 289, the number of proportional seats to 176, the House of Representatives overall shrinks to 465. The reform took effect one month after promulgation, on July 16, 2017.

Based on a legal amendment in 2016, the number of electoral districts in each prefecture is currently apportioned according to the Adams method in proportion to the number of voters in the prefecture in the large-scale census conducted every 10 years. Based on the first large-scale census conducted in 2020 after the legal amendment, the single-seat constituency boundaries were revised in the 2022 Election Law amendment. Ten prefectures (Miyagi, Fukushima, Niigata, Shiga, Wakayama, Okayama, Hiroshima, Yamaguchi, Ehime, and Nagasaki) lost one constituency each, while Saitama, Chiba, and Aichi each gained one, Kanagawa gained two, and Tokyo gained five.

== Hokkaidō (8 block seats) ==
The block constituency for Hokkaidō (比例北海道ブロック) elects 8 members proportionally. It contains only Hokkaidō Prefecture, which is divided into 12 single-member districts.

=== Hokkaidō Prefecture (12 districts) ===
District	Areas included	Number of constituents	Current representative	Party represented	Map
District 1	Sapporo, wards of Chūō-ku and Minami-ku, parts Nishi-ku and Kita-ku wards	455,279	Takahiro Katō	LDP	
District 2	Sapporo, ward of Higashi-ku and part of Kita-ku ward	459,952	Yusuke Takahashi	LDP	
District 3 (Note: Redistricted in 2022 (First effective in the 2024 Japanese General Election))	Sapporo, wards of Toyohira-ku, Kiyota-ku and part of Shiroishi-ku ward	462,546	Hirohisa Takagi	LDP	
District 4	Sapporo, ward of Teine-ku and part of Nishi-ku ward Cities of Otaru and Ishikari Shiribeshi Subprefecture	398,852	Hiroyuki Nakamura	LDP	
District 5	Sapporo, ward of Atsubetsu-ku, part of Shiroishi-ku ward Cities of Chitose, Ebetsu, Eniwa and Kitahiroshima Ishikari Subprefecture	428,845	Yoshiaki Wada	LDP	
District 6 (Note: Redistricted in 2002 (first effective in the 2003 House of Representatives election))	Cities of Asahikawa, Furano, Nayoro and Shibetsu Kamikawa Subprefecture	395,302	Kuniyoshi Azuma	LDP	
District 7	Cities of Kushiro and Nemuro Kushiro Subprefecture and Nemuro Subprefecture	237,537	Takako Suzuki	LDP	
District 8	Cities of Hakodate and Hokuto Hiyama Subprefecture and Oshima Subprefecture	339,230	Jun Mukōyama	LDP	
District 9	Cities of Date, Muroran, Noboribetsu and Tomakomai Hidaka Subprefecture and Iburi Subprefecture	361,963	Hideki Matsushita	LDP	
District 10	Cities of Akabira, Ashibetsu, Bibai, Fukagawa, Iwamizawa, Mikasa, Rumoi, Sunagawa, Takikawa and Utashinai Rumoi Subprefecture and Sorachi Subprefecture	262,277	Hiroshi Kamiya	CRAJ	
District 11	City of Obihiro Tokachi Subprefecture	273,408	Koichi Nakagawa	LDP	
District 12	Cities of Abashiri, Kitami, Monbetsu and Wakkanai Okhotsk Subprefecture and Sōya Subprefecture	267,346	Arata Takebe	LDP	

== Tohoku (12 block seats) ==
The block constituency for Tohoku (比例東北ブロック) elects 14 members proportionally. It corresponds to the Tohoku region.

=== Akita Prefecture (3 districts) ===
District	Areas included	Number of constituents	Current representative	Party represented	Map
1st district	City of Akita	253,265	Hiroyuki Togashi	LDP	
2nd district	Cities of Katagami, Kazuno, Kitaakita, Noshiro, Ōdate and Oga Districts of Kazuno, Kitaakita, Minamiakita and Yamamoto	239,942	Junji Fukuhara	LDP	
3rd district	Cities of Daisen, Nikaho, Semboku, Yokote, Yurihonjō and Yuzawa Districts of Ogachi and Senboku	299,529	Toshihide Muraoka	DPP	

=== Aomori Prefecture (3 districts) ===
District	Areas included	Number of constituents	Current representative	Party represented	Map
District 1	Cities of Aomori and Mutsu District of Higashitsugaru, Shimokita and part of district of Kamikita	323,705	Jun Tsushima	LDP	
District 2	Cities of Hachinohe, Misawa and Towada Part of district of Shimokita	371,661	Junichi Kanda	LDP	
District 3	Cities of Hirakawa, Hirosaki, Goshogawara, Kuroishi and Tsugaru Districts of Kitatsugaru, Minamitsugaru, Nakatsugaru and Nishitsugaru	327,919	Jiro Kimura	LDP	

=== Fukushima Prefecture (4 districts) ===
District	Areas included	Number of constituents	Current representative	Party represented	Map
District 1	Cities of Date, Fukushima, Motomiya and Nihonmatsu Districts of Date and Sōma	376,502	Naotoshi Nishiyama	LDP	
District 2	Cities of Kōriyama, Sukagawa and Tamura Districts of Iwase, Ishikawa and Tamura	419,955	Taku Nemoto	LDP	
District 3	Cities of Aizuwakamatsu, Kitakata and Shirakawa District of Higashishirakawa, Kawanuma, Minamiaizu, Nishishirakawa, Ōnuma and Yama	320,070	Kentarō Uesugi	LDP	
4th District	Cities of Iwaki, Minamisōma and Sōma Districts of Futaba and Sōma	392,434	Ryūtarō Sakamoto	LDP	

=== Iwate Prefecture (3 districts) ===
District	Areas included	Number of constituents	Current representative	Party represented	Map
1st district	City of Morioka; District of Shiwa	286,099	Takeshi Shina	CRAJ	
2nd district (Note: Redistricted in 2013 (first effective in the 2014 House of Representatives election))	Cities of Hachimantai, Kamaishi, Kuji, Miyako, Ninohe, Ōfunato, Rikuzentakata, Takizawa, and Tōno; Districts of Iwate, Kamihei, Kesen, Kunohe, Ninohe, and Shimohei	342,912	Shun'ichi Suzuki	LDP	
3rd district	Cities of Hanamaki, Ichinoseki, Kitakami, and Ōshū; Districts of Isawa, Nishiiwai, and Waga	360,309	Takashi Fujiwara	LDP	

=== Miyagi Prefecture (5 districts) ===
District	Areas included	Number of constituents	Current representative	Party represented	Map
1st district	Sendai, wards of Aoba-ku and Taihaku-ku	448,291	Tōru Doi	LDP	
2nd district	Sendai, wards of Izumi-ku, Miyagino-ku and Wakabayashi-ku	453,667	Katsuyuki Watanabe	LDP	
3rd district	Cities of Iwanuma, Kakuda, Natori, and Shiroishi; Districts of Igu, Katta, Shibata, and Watari	276,350	Akihiro Nishimura	LDP	
4th district	Cities of Higashimatsushima, Ishinomaki, Shiogama, Tagajō, and Tomiya; Districts of Kurokawa, Miyagi, and Oshika	379,938	Chisato Morishita	LDP	
5th district	Cities of Kesennuma, Kurihara, Ōsaki, and Tome; Districts of Kami, Motoyoshi, and Tōda	332,993	Itsunori Onodera	LDP	

=== Yamagata Prefecture (3 districts) ===
District	Areas included	Number of constituents	Current representative	Party represented	Map
1st district	Cities of Kaminoyama, Tendō, and Yamagata; District of Higashimurayama	294,877	Toshiaki Endo	LDP	
2nd district	Cities of Higashine, Murayama, Nagai, Nan'yō, Obanazawa, Sagae, and Yonezawa; Districts of Higashiokitama, Kitamurayama, Nishimurayama, and Nishiokitama	297,350	Norikazu Suzuki	LDP	
3rd district	Cities of Sakata, Shinjō, and Tsuruoka; Districts of Akumi, Higashitagawa, and Mogami	270,727	Ayuko Kato	LDP	

== Kita- (North) Kanto (19 block seats) ==
The Northern Kanto proportional representation block (北関東) elects 20 members proportionally. It includes four prefectures in northern Kanto.

=== Gunma Prefecture (5 districts) ===
District	Areas included	Number of constituents	Current representative	Party represented	Map
1st district	Cities of Maebashi and Numata; District of Tone	336,483	Yasutaka Nakasone	LDP	
2nd district	Cities of Isesaki, Kiryū, and Midori; District Sawa	323,710	Toshiro Ino	LDP	
3rd district	Cities of Ōta and Tatebayashi; District of Oura	314,548	Hiroyoshi Sasakawa	LDP	
4th district	Cities of Fujioka and part of Takasaki; District of Tano	290,465	Tatsuo Fukuda	LDP	
5th district	Cities of Annaka, Shibukawa, Tomioka, and part of Takasaki; Districts of Agatsuma, Kanra, and Kitagunma	307,616	Yūko Obuchi	LDP	

=== Ibaraki Prefecture (7 districts) ===
District	Areas included	Number of constituents	Current representative	Party represented	Map
1st district	Cities of Chikusei, Kasama, Mito, and Sakuragawa District of Higashiibaraki (Town of Shirosato)	416,696	Yoshinori Tadokoro	LDP	
2nd district	Cities of Hokota, Itako, Kashima, Kamisu, Namegata, and Omitama District of Higashiibaraki (Towns of Ibaraki and Ōarai)	295,363	Fukushiro Nukaga	LDP	
3rd district	Cities of Inashiki, Moriya, Ryūgasaki, Toride, and Ushiku Districts of Inashiki and Kitasouma	385,766	Yasuhiro Hanashi	LDP	
4th district	Cities of Hitachinaka, Hitachiōmiya, Hitachiōta, and Naka District of Kuji	262,114	Hiroshi Kajiyama	LDP	
5th district	Cities of Hitachi, Kitaibaraki, and Takahagi District of Naka	230,687	Satoshi Asano	DPFP	
6th district	Cities of Ishioka, Kasumigaura, Tsuchiura, Tsukuba, and Tsukubamirai	455,564	Ayano Kunimitsu	LDP	
7th district	Cities of Bandō, Jōsō, Koga, Shimotsuma and Yūki Districts of Sashima and Yūki	320,150	Hayato Nakamura	Ind. (Note: Father was a member of the CDP. However, since the CDP restricts hereditary succession, Hayato ran as an independent)	

=== Saitama Prefecture (16 districts) ===
District	Areas included	Number of constituents	Current representative	Party represented	Map
1st district	Saitama, wards of Midori-ku, Minuma, and Urawa-ku	387,753	Hideki Murai	LDP	
2nd district	Part of city of Kawaguchi	388,246	Yoshitaka Shindō	LDP	
3rd district	Cities of Koshigaya and part of Kawaguchi	380,633	Hitoshi Kikawada	LDP	
4th district	Cities of Asaka, Niiza, Shiki, and Wakō	391,025	Yasushi Hosaka	LDP	
5th district	Saitama, wards of Chūō-ku, Kita-ku, Nishi-ku and Ōmiya-ku	399,486	Yutaka Ihara	LDP	
6th district	Cities of Ageo, Kitamoto, Kōnosu, and Okegawa	413,155	Akihito Obana	LDP	
7th district	Cities of Fujimi and Kawagoe	388,446	Hideyuki Nakano	LDP	
8th district	Cities of Fujimino, and Tokorozawa District of Iruma (Town of Miyoshi)	417,568	Masahiko Shibayama	LDP	
9th district	Cities of Hannō, Hidaka, Iruma, and Sayama District of Iruma (Towns of Moroyama and Ogose)	398,261	Taku Otsuka	LDP	
10th district	Cities of Higashimatsuyama, Sakado, and Tsurugashima District of Hiki	324,351	Susumu Yamaguchi	LDP	
11th district	Cities of Chichibu, Fukaya, and Honjō Districts of Chichibu, Kodama, and Ōsato	332,461	Ryūji Koizumi	LDP	
12th district	Cities of Gyōda, Hanyū, Kazo, and Kumagaya	366,773	Atsushi Nonaka	LDP	
13th district	Cities of Hasuda, Kuki, Satte, and Shiraoka Districts of Kita-Adachi, Kitakatsushika (Town of Sugito), and Minamisaitama	369,108	Hiromi Mitsubayashi	LDP	
14th district	Cities of Misato, Sōka, and Yashio	401,401	Makoto Fujita	LDP	
15th district	Saitama, wards of Minami-ku and Sakura-ku Cities Toda and Warabi	412,522	Ryōsei Tanaka	LDP	
16th district (Note: Created in 2022 (First effective in the 2024 Japanese General Election))	Saitama, ward of Iwatsuki-ku Cities of Kasukabe and Yoshikawa District of Kitakatsushika (Town of Matsubushi)	372,652	Shinako Tsuchiya	LDP	

=== Tochigi Prefecture (5 districts) ===
District	Areas included	Number of constituents	Current representative	Party represented	Map
1st district	Part of city of Utsunomiya District of Kawachi	416,462	Hajime Funada	LDP	
2nd district	Cities of Kanuma, Nikkō, Sakura, and part of Utsunomiya District of Shioya	249,056	Kiyoshi Igarashi	LDP	
3rd district	Cities of Nasukarasuyama, Nasushiobara, Ōtawara, and Yaita District of Nasu	233,377	Shintaro Watanabe	Ind	
4th district	Cities of Mooka, Oyama, and Shimotsuke Districts of Haga and Shimotsuga	352,039	Masaru Ishizaka	LDP	
5th district	Cities of Ashikaga, Sano, and Tochigi	338,944	Toshimitsu Motegi	LDP	

== Minami- (Southern) Kanto (23 block seats) ==
The block constituency for southern Kanto (比例南関東ブロック, hirei minami-Kantō burokku) elects 22 members proportionally. It includes two prefectures in southern Kanto and one in eastern Chubu.

=== Chiba Prefecture (14 districts) ===
District	Areas included	Number of constituents	Current representative	Party represented	Map
1st district	Chiba, wards of Chūō-ku, Inage-ku, and Mihama-ku	441,218	Hiroaki Kadoyama	LDP	
2nd district	Chiba, ward of Hanamigawa-ku City Yachiyo	319,069	Takayuki Kobayashi	LDP	
3rd district	Chiba, ward of Midori-ku City of Ichihara	332,534	Hirokazu Matsuno	LDP	
4th district	Part of the cities of Funabashi, Ichikawa	408,742	Yusuke Kashima	LDP	
5th district	Cities of Urayasu, and part of Ichikawa	418,407	Arfiya Eri	LDP	
6th district	City of Matsudo	415,377	Hiromichi Watanabe	LDP	
7th district	Cities of Nagareyama and Noda	298,442	Ken Saitō	LDP	
8th district	City of Kashiwa	361,789	Izumi Matsumoto	LDP	
9th district	Chiba, ward of Wakaba-ku Cities of Sakura, Yachimata, and Yotsukaidō	400,181	Hisato Tamiya	LDP	
10th district	Cities of Asahi, Chōshi, Katori, Narita, and Sōsa Districts of Katori	318,855	Masaaki Koike	LDP	
11th district	Cities of Isumi, Katsuura, Mobara, Ōamishirasato, Tōgane, and Sanmu Districts of Chōsei, Isumi, and Sanbu	345,370	Eisuke Mori	LDP	
12th district	Cities of Futtsu, Kamogawa, Kimitsu, Kisarazu, Minamibōsō, Sodegaura, and Tateyama District of Awa	371,144	Yasukazu Hamada	LDP	
13th district (Note: Created in the 2002 reapportionment (first effective in the 2003 House of Representatives election))	Cities of Abiko, Inzai, Kamagaya, Shiroi, and Tomisato District of Iba	417,827	Hisashi Matsumoto	LDP	
14th district	Cities of Narashino and part of Funabashi	413,431	Yoshihiko Noda	CRAJ	

=== Kanagawa Prefecture (20 districts) ===
District	Areas included	Number of constituents	Current representative	Party represented	Map
1st district	Yokohama, wards of Naka-ku, Isogo-ku, and Kanazawa-ku	424,793	Natsuko Maruo	LDP	
2nd district	Yokohama, wards of Kōnan-ku, Minami-ku, and Nishi-ku	436,476	Nitta Shobun	LDP	
3rd district	Yokohama, wards of Kanagawa-ku and Tsurumi-ku	449,343	Kenji Nakanishi	LDP	
4th district	Yokohama, ward of Sakae-ku Cities of Kamakura and Zushi Districts of Miura	329,894	Marina Nagata	LDP	
5th district	Yokohama, wards of Izumi-ku and Totsuka-ku	363,330	Manabu Sakai	LDP	
6th district	Yokohama, wards of Asahi-ku and Hodogaya-ku	377,316	Naoki Furukawa	LDP	
7th district	Yokohama, ward of Kōhoku-ku	301,876	Keisuke Suzuki	LDP	
8th district	Yokohama, wards of Midori-ku and Aoba-ku	408,873	Hidehiro Mitani	LDP	
9th district	Kawasaki, wards of Asao-ku and Tama-ku	336,776	Masahiro Uehara	LDP	
10th district	Kawasaki, wards of Kawasaki-ku and Saiwai-ku)	332,878	Kazunori Tanaka	LDP	
11th district	Cities of Miura and Yokosuka.	360,287	Shinjirō Koizumi	LDP	
12th district	City of Fujisawa District of Koza	412,246	Tsuyoshi Hoshino	LDP	
13th district	Yokohama, ward of Seya-ku Cities of Ayase and Yamato	374,032	Koichiro Maruta	LDP	
14th district	Sagamihara, wards of Chūō-ku and Midori-ku District of Aikō	402,467	Jiro Akama	LDP	
15th district	Cities of Chigasaki and Hiratsuka District of Naka (Town of Ōiso)	453,322	Taro Kono	LDP	
16th district	Cities of Atsugi, Ebina, and Isehara	383,206	Masashi Sato	LDP	
17th district	Cities of Hadano, Minamiashigara, and Odawara Districts of Ashigarakami, Ashigarashimo, and Naka (Town of Ninomiya)	441,819	Karen Makishima	LDP	
18th district	Kawasaki, wards of Nakahara-ku and Takatsu-ku	417,184	Daishiro Yamagiwa	LDP	
19th district	Kawasaki, ward of Miyamae-ku Yokohama, ward of Tsuzuki-ku	370,252	Kusama Tsuyoshi	LDP	
20th district	Sagamihara, ward of Minami-ku City of Zama	346,355	Yui Kanazawa	LDP	

=== Yamanashi Prefecture (2 districts) ===
District	Areas included	Number of constituents	Current representative	Party represented	Map
District 1	Cities of Kōfu, Nirasaki, Hokuto, Minami-arupusu, Chūō, Kai; Districts of Nishiyatsushiro, Minamikoma, and Nakakoma	418,192	Shinichi Nakatani	LDP	
District 2	Cities of Yamanashi, Fujiyoshida, Ōtsuki, Tsuru, Fuefuki, Kōshū, and Uenohara; Districts of Kitatsuru and Minamitsuru	252,495	Noriko Horiuchi	LDP	

== Tokyo (19 block seats) ==
The block constituency for Tokyo (比例東京ブロック) elects 17 members proportionally. It covers Tokyo prefecture.

=== Tokyo Metropolis (30 districts) ===
District	Areas included	Number of constituents	Current representative	Party represented	Map
1st district	Tokyo, wards of Chiyoda and Shinjuku	331,113	Miki Yamada	LDP	
2nd district	Tokyo, wards of Chūō and Taitō	327,734	Kiyoto Tsuji	LDP	
3rd district	Tokyo, the ward of Shinagawa. Also includes the Izu Islands and Ogasawara Subprefecture	366,246	Hirotaka Ishihara	LDP	
4th district	Tokyo, part of the ward of Ōta	431,925	Masaaki Taira	LDP	
5th district	Tokyo, part of the ward of Setagaya	378,222	Kenji Wakamiya	LDP	
6th district	Tokyo, part of the ward of Setagaya	403,059	Shogo Azemoto	LDP	
7th district	Tokyo, wards of Minato and Shibuya	404,233	Tamayo Marukawa	LDP	
8th district	Tokyo, part of the ward of Suginami	392,721	Hiroko Kado	LDP	
9th district	Tokyo, part of the ward of Nerima	309,062	Isshu Sugawara	LDP	
10th district	Tokyo, wards of Bunkyō and Toshima	419,976	Hayato Suzuki	LDP	
11th district	Tokyo, part of the ward of Itabashi	392,484	Hakubun Shimomura	LDP	
12th district	Tokyo, wards of Kita and part of Itabashi	380,213	Kei Takagi	LDP	
13th district	Tokyo, part of the ward of Adachi	391,591	Shin Tsuchida	LDP	
14th district	Tokyo, wards of Sumida and part of Edogawa	407,936	Midori Matsushima	LDP	
15th district	Tokyo, ward of Kōtō	434,874	Kōki Ōzora	LDP	
16th district	Tokyo, part of the ward of Edogawa	392,776	Yohei Onishi	LDP	
17th district	Tokyo, ward of Katsushika	385,203	Katsuei Hirasawa	LDP	
18th district	Cities of Musashino, Nishitokyo, and Koganei.	401,191	Kaoru Fukuda	LDP	
19th district	Cities of Kodaira, Kokubunji, and Kunitachi	334,776	Yohei Matsumoto	LDP	
20th district	Cities of Higashimurayama, Higashiyamato, Kiyose, Higashikurume, and Musashimurayama	418,027	Seiji Kihara	LDP	
21st district	Cities of Hino, Tachikawa, and part Hachiōji	407,703	Kiyoshi Odawara	LDP	
22nd district	Cities of Chōfu, Komae, and Mitaka	430,570	Tatsuya Ito	LDP	
23rd district	City of Machida	361,911	Shinichiro Kawamatsu	LDP	
24th district	Part of the city of Hachiōji.	380,361	Kōichi Hagiuda	LDP	
25th district	Cities of Akiruno, Akishima, Fussa, Hamura, and Ōme District of Nishitama	410,527	Shinji Inoue	LDP	
26th district	Tokyo, wards of Meguro and part of Ōta	434,770	Ueki Imaoka	LDP	
27th district	Tokyo, wards of Nakano and part of Suginami	384,862	Yuichi Kurosaki	LDP	
28th district	Tokyo, part of the ward of Nerima	315,926	Takao Ando	LDP	
29th district	Tokyo, wards of Arakawa and part of Adachi	358,101	Kosuke Nagasawa	LDP	
30th district	Cities of Fuchū, Inagi, and Tama	422,243	Akihisa Nagashima	LDP	

== Hokuriku-Shin'etsu (10 block seats) ==
The block constituency for Hokuriku-Shin'etsu (北陸信越) elects 11 members proportionally. It combines five prefectures of the Hokuriku and Shin'etsu subregions in northern Chubu.

=== Fukui Prefecture (2 districts) ===
District	Areas included	Number of constituents	Current representative	Party represented	Map
1st district	Cities of Awara, Fukui, Katsuyama, Ono, and Sakai District of Yoshida	363,492	Tomomi Inada	LDP	
2nd district	Cities of Echizen, Obama, Sabae, and Tsuruga Districts of Imadate, Mikata, Minamikaminaka, Nanjō, Nyū, and Ōi	253,471	Takeshi Saiki	LDP	

=== Ishikawa Prefecture (3 districts) ===
District	Areas included	Number of constituents	Current representative	Party represented	Map
1st district	City of Kanazawa	371,757	Takuo Komori	LDP	
2nd district	Cities of Hakusan, Kaga, Komatsu, Nomi, and Nonoichi District of Nomi	321,328	Hajime Sasaki	LDP	
3rd district	Cities of Hakui, Kahoku, Nanao, Suzu, and Wajima. Districts of Hakui, Hōsu, Kahoku, and Kashima.	227,067	Shoji Nishida	LDP	

=== Niigata Prefecture (5 districts) ===
District	Areas included	Number of constituents	Current representative	Party represented	Map
1st district	Niigata, wards of Chūō-ku, Higashi-ku, and Kōnan-ku City of Sado	357,548	Ko Uchiyama	LDP	
2nd district	Niigata, wards of Minami-ku, Nishi-ku, and Nishikan-ku Cities of Sanjō, Kamo, and Tsubame Districts of Minamikanbara and Nishikanbara	389,898	Isato Kunisada	LDP	
3rd district	Niigata, wards of Akiha-ku and Kita-ku Cities of Agano, Gosen, Murakami, Shibata, and Tainai Districts of Higashikanbara, Iwafune, and Kitakanbara	366,303	Hiroaki Saito	LDP	
4th district	Cities of Kashiwazaki, Mitsuke, Nagaoka, and Ojiya District of Kariwa and Santō	349,437	Eiichiro Washio	LDP	
5th district	Cities of Itoigawa, Jōetsu, Minamiuonuma, Myōkō, Uonuma, and Tōkamachi Districts of Minamiuonuma and Nakauonuma	336,993	Shuichi Takatori	LDP	

=== Nagano Prefecture (5 districts) ===
District	Areas included	Number of constituents	Current representative	Party represented	Map
1st district	Cities of Iiyama, Nakano, Suzaka, and part of Nagano Districts of Kamitakai, Shimominochi, and Shimotakai	414,923	Kenta Wakabayashi	LDP	
2nd district	Cities of Azumino, Matsumoto and Ōmachi, and part of Nagano Districts of Higashichikuma, Kamiminochi, and Kitaazumi	374,529	Hikaru Fujita	LDP	
3rd district	Cities of Chikuma, Komoro, Saku, Tōmi and Ueda Districts of Chiisagata, Hanishina, Kitasaku, and Minamisaku	391,653	Yosei Ide	LDP	
4th district	Cities of Chino, Okaya, Shiojiri, and Suwa Districts of Kiso and Suwa	233,933	Shigeyuki Goto	LDP	
5th district	Cities of Iida, Ina and Komagane Districts of Kamiina and Shimoina	270,927	Ichiro Miyashita	LDP	

=== Toyama Prefecture (3 districts) ===
District	Areas included	Number of constituents	Current representative	Party represented	Map
1st district	Part of the city of Toyama	263,242	Hiroshi Nakada	LDP	
2nd district	Cities of Kurobe, Namerikawa, Uozu, and part of Toyama Districts of Nakaniikawa and Shimoniikawa.	237,585	Eishun Ueda	LDP	
3rd district	Cities of Himi, Imizu, Nanto, Oyabe, Takaoka, and Tonami	349,960	Keiichiro Tachibana	LDP	

== Tokai (21 block seats) ==
The block constituency for Tokai (東海) elects 21 members proportionally. It covers three prefectures in southern Chubu, as well as one prefecture in Kinki.

=== Aichi Prefecture (16 districts) ===
District	Areas included	Number of constituents	Current representative	Party represented	Map
1st district	Nagoya, wards of Higashi, Kita, Nishi, and Naka	413,536	Takashi Kawamura	Tax Cuts Japan and Yukoku Alliance	
2nd district	Nagoya, wards of Chikusa, Moriyama and Meitō	404,572	Motohisa Furukawa	DPP	
3rd district	Nagoya, wards of Shōwa, Midori and Tenpaku	418,057	Yoshihiko Mizuno	LDP	
4th district	Nagoya, wards of Mizuho, Atsuta, Minato and Minami.	366,478	Shozo Kudo	LDP	
5th district	Nagoya, wards of Nakamura and Nakagawa. City of Kiyosu	349,556	Yasuhiro Okamoto	LDP	
6th district	Cities of Kasugai and Seto	353,805	Hideki Niwa	LDP	
7th district	Cities of Nagakute, Nisshin, Ōbu, Owariasahi, and Toyoake District of Aichi	354,699	Saria Hino	DPP	
8th district	Cities of Handa, Tokoname, Tōkai and Chita District of Chita	431,748	Tadahiko Ito	LDP	
9th district	Cities of Ama, Aisai, Inazawa, Tsushima, and Yatomi District of Ama	376,463	Yasumasa Nagasaka	LDP	
10th district	Cities of Ichinomiya and Iwakura	349,767	Shinji Wakayama	LDP	
11th district	Cities of Miyoshi and Toyota	382,674	Midori Tanno	DPP	
12th district	Cities of Okazaki and Nishio	441,336	Shuhei Aoyama	LDP	
13th district	Cities of Hekinan, Kariya, Anjō, Chiryū, and Takahama	422,982	Taku Ishii	LDP	
14th district	Cities of Toyokawa, Gamagōri, and Shinshiro District of Nukata and Kitashitara	288,243	Soichiro Imaeda	LDP	
15th district	Cities of Toyohashi and Tahara	340,014	Yukinori Nemoto	LDP	
16th district	Cities of Kitanagoya, Komaki, Kōnan, and Inuyama District of Nishikasugai and Niwa	388,491	Shizuo Yamashita	LDP	

=== Gifu Prefecture (5 districts) ===
District	Areas included	Number of constituents	Current representative	Party represented	Map
1st district	City of Gifu	331,037	Seiko Noda	LDP	
2nd district	Cities of Ōgaki and Kaizu Districts of Anpachi, Fuwa, Ibi, and Yōrō	289,874	Yasufumi Tanahashi	LDP	
3rd district	Cities of Hashima, Kakamigahara, Mino, Mizuho, Motosu, Seki, and Yamagata Districts of Hashima and Motosu	405,814	Yoji Muto	LDP	
4th district	Cities of Gero, Gujō, Hida, Kani, Minokamo, and Takayama District of Kamo, Kani and Ōno	317,175	Tomohiro Kato	LDP	
5th district	Cities of Ena, Mizunami, Nakatsugawa, Tajimi, and Toki	261,467	Keiji Furuya	LDP	

=== Mie Prefecture (4 districts) ===
District	Areas included	Number of constituents	Current representative	Party represented	Map
1st district	Cities of Matsuaka and Tsu	348,669	Norihisa Tamura	LDP	
2nd district	Cities of Iga, Kameyama, Nabari, Suzuka, and part of Yokkaichi	397,250	Hideto Kawasaki	LDP	
3rd district	Cities of Inabe, Kuwana, and part of Yokkaichi Districts of Inabe, Kuwana, and Mie	408,282	Masataka Ishihara	LDP	
4th district	Cities of Ise, Kumano, Owase, Toba, and Shima Disitricts of Kitamuro, Minamimuro, Taki, and Watarai	279,688	Eikei Suzuki	LDP	

=== Shizuoka Prefecture (8 districts) ===
District	Areas included	Number of constituents	Current representative	Party represented	Map
1st district	Shizuoka, wards of Aoi and Suruga	379,329	Yōko Kamikawa	LDP	
2nd district	Cities of Fujieda, Makinohara, Shimada, and Yaizu District of Haibara	369,213	Tatsunori Ibayashi	LDP	
3rd district	Cities Fukuroi, Iwata, Kakegawa, Kikugawa, and Omaezaki District of Shūchi	368,639	Yuzo Yamamoto	LDP	
4th district	Shizuoka, ward of Shimizu-ku Cities of Fujinomiya and part of Fuji	309,037	Yoichi Fukazawa	LDP	
5th district	Cities of Gotemba, Mishima, Susono, and part of Fuji Districts of Tagata and Suntō (Towns of Oyama)	434,602	Goshi Hosono	LDP	
6th district	Cities of Atami, Itō, Izu, Izunokuni, Numazu, and Shimoda Districts	418,600	Takaaki Katsumata	LDP	
7th district	Hamamatsu, wards of Hamakita, Kita-ku, Nishi-ku, and Tenryū City of Kosai	309,684	Minoru Kiuchi	LDP	
8th district	Hamamatsu, wards of Higashi, Minami, and Naka	378,003	Daisuke Inaba	LDP	

== Kinki/Kansai (28 block seats) ==
The block constituency for Kinki (Kansai) (近畿) elects 29 members proportionally. It corresponds to the Kinki region minus Mie Prefecture.

=== Hyōgo Prefecture (12 districts) ===
District	Areas included	Number of constituents	Current representative	Party represented	Map
1st district	Kobe, wards of Chūō-ku, Higashinada-ku, and Nada-ku	391,912	Masahito Moriyama	LDP	
2nd district	Kobe, wards of Hyōgo-ku, Kita-ku, and Nagata-ku Part of the city of Nishinomiya	377,939	Keishi Abe	Ishin	
3rd district	Kobe, wards of Suma-ku and Tarumi-ku	305,262	Yoshihiro Seki	LDP	
4th district	Kobe, ward of Nishi-ku Cities of Kasai, Katō, Miki, Nishiwaki, and Ono District of Taka	407,262	Hisayuki Fujii	LDP	
5th district	Cities of Asago, Sanda, Tamba, Tamba-Sasayama, Toyooka, Yabu, and part of Kawanishi Districts of Kawabe and Mikata	366,779	Koichi Tani	LDP	
6th district	Cities of Itami, Takarazuka, and part of Kawanishi	443,935	Masaki Ogushi	LDP	
7th district	Cities of Ashiya and part of Nishinomiya	442,552	Kenji Yamada	LDP	
8th district	City of Amagasaki	383,987	Shigeharu Aoyama	LDP	
9th district	Cities of Akashi, Awaji, Minamiawaji, and Sumoto	359,474	Yasutoshi Nishimura	LDP	
10th district	Cities of Kakogawa and Takasago District of Kako	341,859	Kisaburo Tokai	LDP	
11th district	Part of the city of Himeji	394,695	Motoyasu Yamada	LDP	
12th district	Cities of Aioi, Akō, Shisō, Tatsuno, and part of Himeji Districts of Akō, Ibo, Kanzaki, and Sayō	270,931	Tsuyoshi Yamaguchi	LDP	

=== Kyoto Prefecture (6 districts) ===
District	Areas included	Number of constituents	Current representative	Party represented	Map
1st district	Kyoto, wards of Kamigyō-ku, Kita-ku, Nakagyō-ku, Minami-ku, and Shimogyō-ku	386,872	Yasushi Katsume	LDP	
2nd district	Kyoto, wards of Higashiyama-ku, Sakyō-ku, and Yamashina-ku	256,640	Seiji Maehara	Ishin	
3rd district	Kyoto, ward of Fushimi-ku Cities of Mukō and Nagaokakyō District of Otokuni	348,425	Kenta Izumi	CRAJ	
4th district	Kyoto, wards of Nishikyō-ku and Ukyō-ku Cities of Kameoka and Nantan District of Funai	386,705	Keiro Kitagami	LDP	
5th district	Cities of Ayabe, Fukuchiyama, Kyōtango, Maizuru, and Miyazu District of Yosa	225,460	Taro Honda	LDP	
6th district	Cities of Jōyō, Kizugawa, Kyōtanabe, Uji, and Yawata Districts of Kuse, Sōraku, and Tsuzuki	452,652	Hiromichi Sonozaki	LDP	

=== Nara Prefecture (3 districts) ===
District	Areas included	Number of constituents	Current representative	Party represented	Map
1st district	Cities of Ikoma and part of Nara	388,920	Shigeki Kobayashi	LDP	
2nd district	Cities of Kashiba, Tenri, Yamatokōriyama, and part of Nara Districts of Ikoma, Kitakatsuragi, Shiki, and Yamabe	375,023	Sanae Takaichi	LDP	
3rd district	Cities of Gojō, Gose, Kashihara, Katsuragi, Sakurai, Uda and Yamatotakada Districts of Takaichi, Uda, and Yoshino	340,604	Taido Tanose	LDP	

=== Osaka Prefecture (19 districts) ===
District	Areas included	Number of constituents	Current representative	Party represented	Map
1st district	Osaka, wards of Chūō-ku, Higashinari-ku, Minato-ku, Naniwa-ku, Nishi-ku, and Tennōji-ku	448,093	Hidetaka Inoue	Ishin	
2nd district	Osaka, wards of Abeno-ku, Higashisumiyoshi-ku, Hirano-ku, and Ikuno-ku	441,748	Ryo Takami	Ishin	
3rd district	Osaka, wards of Nishinari-ku, Suminoe-ku, Sumiyosho-ku, and Taisho-ku	357,873	Tōru Azuma	Ishin	
4th district	Osaka, wards of Fukushima-ku, Jōtō-ku, Kita-ku, and Miyakojima-ku	417,674	Teruo Minobe	Ishin	
5th district	Osaka, wards of Higashiyodogawa-ku, Konohana-ku, Nishiyodogawa-ku, and Yodogawa-ku	434,254	Satoshi Umemura	Ishin	
6th district	Osaka, wards of Asahi-ku and Tsurumi-ku Cities of Kadoma and Moriguchi	386,047	Kaoru Nishida	Ishin	
7th district	Cities of Settsu and Suita	389,943	Takemitsu Okushita	Ishin	
8th district	Cities of Ikeda and Toyonaka	421,145	Joji Uruma	Ishin	
9th district	Cities of Ibaraki and Minoo District of Toyono	373,028	Kei Hagihara	Ishin	
10th district	City of Takatsuki District of Mishima	317,639	Taku Ikeshita	Ishin	
11th district	Cities of Hirakata and Katano	394,606	Hiroshi Nakatsuka	Ishin	
12th district	Cities of Daitō, Neyagawa, and Shijōnawate	332,750	Fumitake Fujita	Ishin	
13th district	City of Higashiōsaka	396,307	Ryohei Iwatani	Ishin	
14th district	Cities of Fujiidera, Habikino, Kashiwara, and Yao	412,303	Hitoshi Aoyagi	Ishin	
15th district	Sakai, ward of Mihara-ku Cities of Kawachinagano, Matsubara, Ōsakasayama, and Tondabayashi District of Minamikawachi	377,612	Yasuto Urano	Ishin	
16th district	Sakai, wards of Higashi-ku, Kita-ku, and Sakai-ku	325,246	Masaki Kuroda	Ishin	
17th district	Sakai, wards of Minami-ku, Naka-ku, and Nishi-ku	321,259	Nobuyuki Baba	Ishin	
18th district	Cities of Izumi, Izumiōtsu, Kishiwada, and Takaishi District of Senboku	426,329	Takashi Endo	Ishin	
19th district	Cities of Hannan, Izumisano, Kaizuka, and Sennan District of Sennan	296,835	Tomu Tanigawa	LDP	

=== Shiga Prefecture (3 districts) ===
District	Areas included	Number of constituents	Current representative	Party represented	Map
1st district	Cities of Ōtsu and Takashima	323,828	Toshitaka Ōoka	LDP	
2nd district	Cities of Higashiōmi, Maibara, Nagahama, Hikone, and Ōmihachiman Districts of Echi, Gamō, and Inukami	428,993	Kenichiro Ueno	LDP	
3rd district	Cities of Kōka, Konan, Kusatsu, Moriyama, Rittō and Yasu	393,239	Nobuhide Takemura	LDP	

=== Wakayama Prefecture (2 districts) ===
District	Areas included	Number of constituents	Current representative	Party represented	Map
1st district	City of Iwade, Kinokawa, and Wakayama	393,307	Daichi Yamamoto	LDP	
2nd district	Cities of Arida, Gobō, Hashimoto, Kainan, Shingū, and Tanabe Districts of Arida, Hidaka, Higashimuro, Ito, Kaisō, and Nishimuro	373,488	Hiroshige Sekō	Ind.	

== Chugoku (10 block seats) ==
The block constituency for Chugoku (中国) elects 11 members proportionally. It corresponds to the Chugoku region.

=== Hiroshima Prefecture (6 districts) ===
District	Areas included	Number of constituents	Current representative	Party represented	Map
1st district	Hiroshima, wards of Higashi-ku, Minami-ku, and Naka-ku District of Aki (Towns of Fuchū, Kaita, and Saka)	407,204	Fumio Kishida	LDP	
2nd district	Hiroshima, wards of Nishi-ku and Saeki-ku Cities of Hatsukaichi, and Ōtake	385,976	Hiroshi Hiraguchi	LDP	
3rd district	Hiroshima, wards of Aki-ku, Asakita-ku and Asaminami-ku City of Akitakata District of Yamagata	415,403	Rintaro Ishibashi	LDP	
4th district	Cities of Etajima, Higashihiroshima, Kure, and Takehara Districts of Toyota and Aki (Town of Kumano)	385,402	Masayoshi Shintani	LDP	
5th district	Fuchū, Mihara, Miyoshi, Onomichi, and Shōbara Districts of Jinseki and Sera	293,922	Shin Yamamoto	LDP	
6th district	City of Fukuyama	373,761	Fumiaki Kobayashi	LDP	

=== Okayama Prefecture (4 districts) ===
District	Areas included	Number of constituents	Current representative	Party represented	Map
1st district	Okayama, ward of Kita-ku Cities of Akaiwa and Bizen Districts of Kaga and Wake	323,886	Ichiro Aisawa	LDP	
2nd district	Okayama, ward of Higashi-ku, Minami-ku, and Naka-ku Cities of Setouchi and Tamano	408,766	Takashi Yamashita	LDP	
3rd district	Cities of Asakuchi, Ibara, Kasaoka, Mimasaka, Maniwa, Niimi, Sōja, Takahashi, and Tsuyama Districts of Aida, Asakuchi, Katsuta, Kume, Maniwa, Oda, and Tomata	391,644	Katsunobu Katō	LDP	
4th district	City of Kurashiki District of Tsukubo	400,763	Gaku Hashimoto	LDP	

=== Shimane Prefecture (2 districts) ===
District	Areas included	Number of constituents	Current representative	Party represented	Map
1st district	Cities of Matsue, Unnan, and Yasugi Districts of Iishi, Nita, and Oki	250,109	Emiko Takagai	LDP	
2nd district	Cities Gōtsu, Hamada, Izumo, Masuda, and Ōda Districts of Kanoashi and Ōchi	285,876	Yasuhiro Takami	LDP	

=== Tottori Prefecture (2 districts) ===
District	Areas included	Number of constituents	Current representative	Party represented	Map
1st district	Cities of Kurayoshi and Tottori District of Iwami, Yazu, and Tōhaku (Town of Misasa)	221,483	Shigeru Ishiba	LDP	
2nd district	Cities of Sakaiminato and Yonago Districts of Hino, Saihaku, and Tōhaku (Towns of Hokuei, Kotoura, and Yurihama)	226,063	Ryosei Akazawa	LDP	

=== Yamaguchi Prefecture (3 districts) ===
District	Areas included	Number of constituents	Current representative	Party represented	Map
1st district	Cities of Hōfu, Ube, and Yamaguchi	381,547	Masahiko Kōmura	LDP	
2nd district	Cities of Hikari, Iwakuni, Kudamatsu, Shūnan, and Yanai Districts of Kuga, Kumage, and Ōshima	371,592	Nobuchiyo Kishi	LDP	
3rd district	Cities of Hagi, Mine, Nagato, San'yō-Onoda, and Shimonoseki District of Abu	338,559	Yoshimasa Hayashi	LDP	

== Shikoku (6 block seats) ==
The block constituency for Shikoku (比例四国ブロック) elects 6 members proportionally. It corresponds to the Shikoku region.

=== Ehime Prefecture (3 districts) ===
District	Areas included	Number of constituents	Representative	Party represented	Map
1st district	City of Matsuyama	418,400	Akihisa Shiozaki	LDP	
2nd district	Cities of Imabari, Niihama, Saijō, and Shikokuchūō District of Ochi	378,247	Takumi Ihara	LDP	
3rd district	Cities Iyo, Ōzu, Seiyo, Uwajima, Tōon, and Yawatahama Districts Iyo, Kamiukena, Kita, Kitauwa, Minamiuwa, and Nishiuwa	298,778	Junji Hasegawa	LDP	

=== Kagawa Prefecture (3 districts) ===
District	Areas included	Number of constituents	Current representative	Party represented	Map
1st district	Part of the city of Takamatsu Districts of Kagawa and Shozu	308,647	Junya Ogawa	CRAJ	
2nd district	Cities of Higashikagawa, Sakaide, Sanuki and parts of Takamatsu and Marugame Districts Kita and Ayauta	247,418	Yuichiro Tamaki	DPP	
3rd district	Cities Kan'onji, Mitoyo, Zentsūji, and part of Marugame District of Nakatado	229,824	Keitaro Ohno	LDP	

=== Kōchi Prefecture (2 districts) ===
District	Areas included	Number of constituents	Current representative	Party represented	Map
1st district	Cities of Aki, Kami, Kōnan, Muroto, Nankoku, and part of Kōchi Districts of Aki, Nagaoka, and Tosa	298,484	Gen Nakatani	LDP	
2nd district	Cities of Shimanto, Susaki, Sukumo and Tosa, Tosashimizu, and part of Kōchi Districts of Agawa, Hata, and Takaoka,	270,397	Masanao Ozaki	LDP	

=== Tokushima Prefecture (2 districts) ===
District	Areas included	Number of constituents	Current representative	Party represented	Map
1st district	Cities of: Tokushima, Komatsushima, and Anan. Districts of: Myodo, Kaifu, Myozai, Katsura, and Naka.	347,085	Hirobumi Niki	LDP	
2nd district	Cities of: Awa, Yoshinogawa, Naruto, Mima, and Miyoshi. Districts of: Itano, Mima, and Miyoshi.	248,184	Shunichi Yamaguchi	LDP	

== Kyūshū (20 block seats) ==
The block constituency for Kyūshū (九州) elects 21 members proportionally. It includes all the prefectures on Kyūshū island, as well as Okinawa Prefecture.

=== Fukuoka Prefecture (11 districts) ===
District	Areas included	Number of constituents	Current representative	Party represented	Map
1st district	Fukuoka, wards of Hakata-ku and part of Higashi-ku	446,399	Takahiro Inoue	LDP	
2nd district	Fukuoka, wards of Chūō-ku and part of Jonan-ku and Minami-ku	461,147	Makoto Oniki	LDP	
3rd district	Fukuoka, wards of Nishi-ku, Sawara-ku, and part of Jonan-ku City of Itoshima	451,103	Atsushi Koga	LDP	
4th district	Fukuoka, part of the ward of Higashi-ku Cities Fukutsu, Koga, and Munakata District of Kasuya	398,074	Hideki Miyauchi	LDP	
5th district	Fukuoka, part of the ward of Minami-ku Cities of Asakura, Chikushino, Dazaifu, Kasuga, Nakagawa and Ōnojō District of Asakura	455,464	Kurihara Wataru	LDP	
6th district	Cities of Kurume, Ogōri, Ōkawa, and Ukiha Districts of Mii and Mizuma	367,500	Jiro Hatoyama	LDP	
7th district	Cities of Chikugo, Miyama, Ōmuta, Yame, and Yanagawa District of Yame	275,406	Satoshi Fujimaru	LDP	
8th district	Cities of Iizuka, Kama, Miyawaka, Nakama, and Nogata Districts of Kaho, Kurate, and Onga	337,128	Tarō Asō	LDP	
9th district	Kitakyushu, wards of Tobata-ku, Wakamatsu-ku, Yahatahigashi-ku, and Yahatanishi-ku	368,137	Rintaro Ogata	Ind.	
10th district	Kitakyushu, wards of Kokurakita-ku, Kokuraminami-ku, and Moji-ku	397,234	Haruka Yoshimura	LDP	
11th district	Cities of Buzen, Tagawa, and Yukuhashi Districts of Chikujō, Miyako, and Tagawa	245,942	Ryota Takeda	LDP	

=== Kagoshima Prefecture (4 districts) ===
District	Areas included	Number of constituents	Current representative	Party represented	Map
1st district	Part of the city of Kagoshima District of Kagoshima	351,769	Takuma Miyaji	LDP	
2nd district	Cities of Amami, Ibusuki, Makurazaki, Minamisatsuma, Minamikyūshū, and part of Kagoshima District of Ōshima	323,331	Satoshi Mitazono	LDP	
3rd district	Cities of Aira, Akune, Hioki, Ichikikushikino, Isa, Izumi, and Satsumasendai Districts of Aira, Izumi, and Satsuma	306,114	Takeshi Noma	CRAJ	
4th district	Cities of Kanoya, Kirishima, Nishinoomote, Shibushi, Soo, and Tarumizu District of Kimotsuki, Kumage, and Soo	310,727	Hiroshi Moriyama	LDP	

=== Kumamoto Prefecture (4 districts) ===
District	Areas included	Number of constituents	Current representative	Party represented	Map
1st district	Kumamoto, wards of Chūō, Higashi, and Kita	420,415	Minoru Kihara	LDP	
2nd district	Kumamoto, wards of Nishi and Minami Cities of Arao and Tamana District of Tamana	308,053	Daisuke Nishino	LDP	
3rd district	Cities of Kōshi, Aso, Kikuchi, and Yamaga Districts of Aso, Kamimashiki, and Kikuchi	311,177	Tetsushi Sakamoto	LDP	
4th district	Cities of Amakusa, Hitoyoshi, Kami-Amakusa, Minamata, Uki, Uto, and Yatsushiro Districts of Ashikita, Amakusa, Kuma, Shimomashiki, and Yatsushiro	379,727	Yasushi Kaneko	LDP	

=== Miyazaki Prefecture (3 districts) ===
District	Areas included	Number of constituents	Current representative	Party represented	Map
Miyazaki 1st	City of Miyazaki District of Higashimorokata	348,048	So Watanabe	CRAJ	
Miyazaki 2nd	Cities of Hyūga, Nobeoka, and Saito Districts of Higashiusuki, Koyu, and Nishiusuki	258,520	Shinji Nagatomo	DPP	
Miyazaki 3rd	Cities of Ebino, Kobayashi, Kushima, Miyakonojō, and Nichinan Districts of Kitamorokata and Nishimorokata	263,286	Yoshihisa Furukawa	LDP	

=== Nagasaki Prefecture (3 districts) ===
District	Areas included	Number of constituents	Current representative	Party represented	Map
1st district	City of Nagasaki	331,998	Hideko Nishioka	DPP	
2nd district	Cities of Iki, Isahaya, Minamishimabara, Ōmura, Shimabara, Unzen, and Tsushima District of Nishisonogi	393,754	Ryusho Kato	LDP	
3rd district	Cities of Gotō, Hirado, Matsuura, Saikai, and Sasebo Districts of Higashisonogi, Kitamatsuura, and Minamimatsura	341,312	Yozo Kaneko	LDP	

=== Ōita Prefecture (3 districts) ===
District	Areas included	Number of constituents	Current representative	Party represented	Map
1st district	Part of the city of Ōita	383,877	Hiroaki Eto	LDP	
2nd district	Cities of Bungo-ōno, Hita, Saiki, Taketa, Tsukumi, Yufu, Usuki, and part of Ōita District of Kusu	250,092	Ken Hirose	LDP	
3rd district	Cities of Beppu, Bungotakada, Kitsuki, Nakatsu, Kunisaki, and Usa Districts of Hayami, and Higashikunisaki	289,039	Takeshi Iwaya	LDP	

=== Okinawa Prefecture (4 districts) ===
District	Areas included	Number of constituents	Current representative	Party represented	Map
1st district	City of Naha District of Shimajiri (Town of Kumejima and villages of Aguni, Kitadaitō, Minamidaitō, Tokashiki, Tonaki, and Zamami)	263,131	Konosuke Kokuba	LDP	
2nd district	Cities of Ginowan and Urasoe District of Nakagami	296,702	Masahisa Miyazaki	LDP	
3rd district	Cities of Nago, Okinawa, Uruma Districts of Kunigami and Shimajiri (Villages of Iheya and Izena)	318,081	Aiko Shimajiri	LDP	
4th district	Cities of Miyakojima, Ishigaki, Itoman, Tomigusuku and Nanjō. Districts of: Miyako, Yaeyama, Shimajiri (Towns of Haebaru, Yaese, and Yonabaru)	299,349	Kōsaburō Nishime	LDP	

=== Saga Prefecture (2 districts) ===
District	Areas included	Number of constituents	Current representative	Party represented	Map
1st district	Cities of Kanzaki, Saga, and Tosu Districts of Kanzaki and Miyaki	329,359	Kazuchika Iwata	LDP	
2nd district	Cities of Kashima, Ogi, Imari, Karatsu, Ureshino, Takeo, and Taku. Districts of Fujitsu, Kishima, Higashimatsuura, and Nishimatsuura.	326,944	Yasushi Furukawa	LDP	

== See also ==
- List of districts of the House of Councillors of Japan
- List of current members of the House of Representatives of Japan
- House of Representatives (Japan)
- List of proportional representation blocks of the House of Representatives of Japan
- Proportional representation
