= Chūō-ku, Hamamatsu =

Chūō 中央区
- Ward
- Chūō Ward
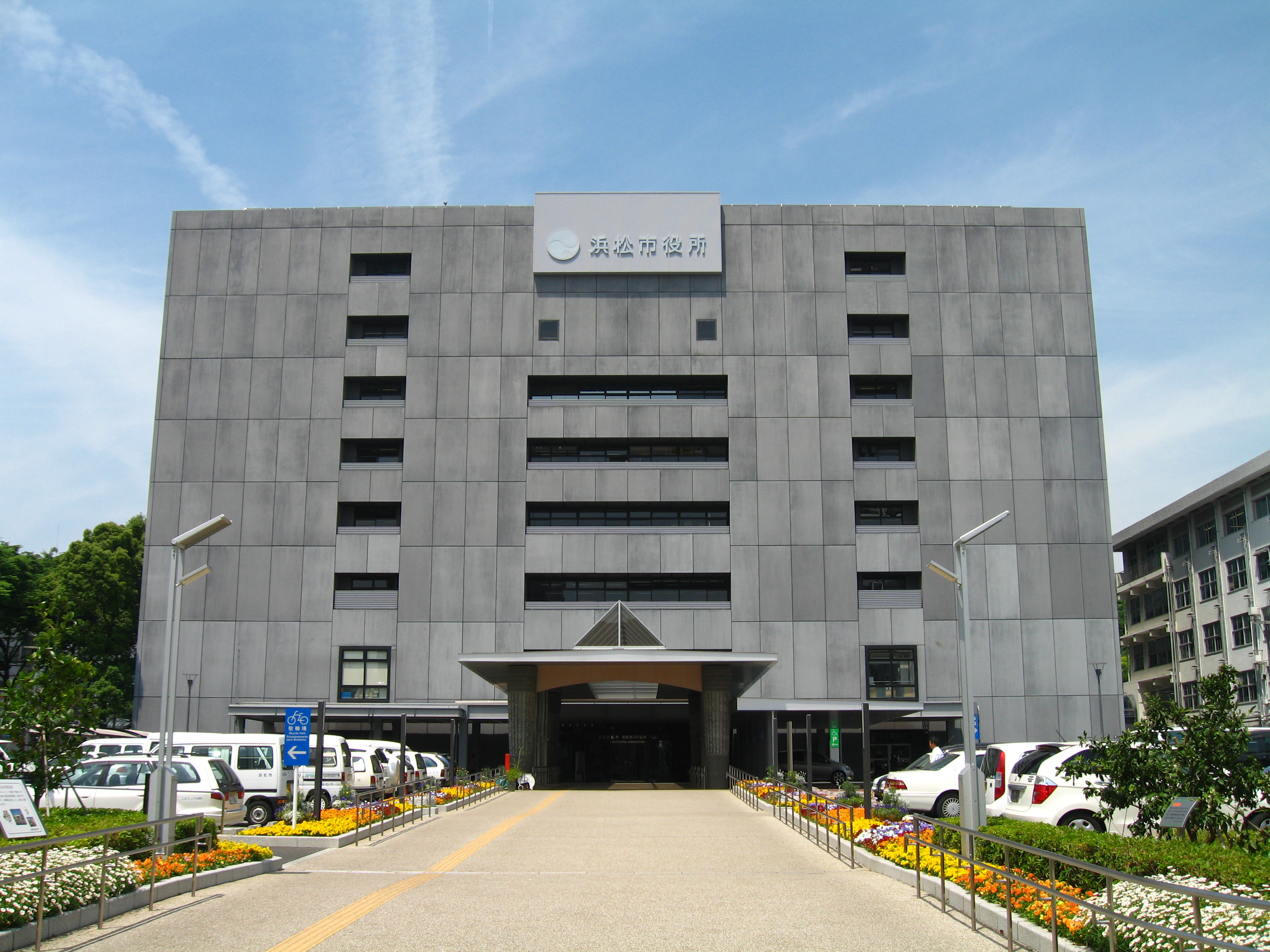
- Chūō Ward Office

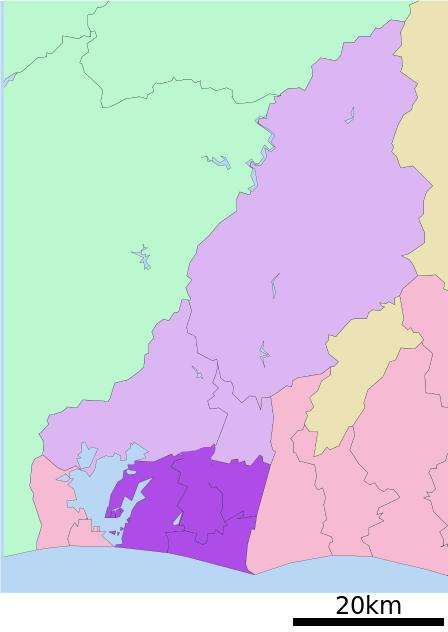
- Location of Chūō-ku in Shizuoka

- Coordinates: 34°42′38.9″N 137°43′33.9″E
- Country: Japan
- Region: Chūbu
- Prefecture: Shizuoka
- City: Hamamatsu

Area
  - Total: 268.45 km^{2} (103.65 sq mi)
- population of the area which will be Chūō-ku

Population (October 1, 2023)
  - Total: 608,145
  - Density: 2,265.4/km^{2} (5,867.3/sq mi)
- population of the area which will be Chūō-ku
- Time zone: UTC+9 (Japan Standard Time)
- Phone number: 053-457-2111
- Address: 103-2 Motoshiro-cho, Chūō-ku, Hamamatsu-shi, Shizuoka-ken 430-8652

Chūō-ku (中央区, Chūō-ku) is one of the three wards of Hamamatsu, Shizuoka, Japan, located in the south part of the city. It encompasses the site of Hamamatsu Castle, Lake Hamana and Hamamatsu Station, the central business and residential district. Although its area is the smallest of the three wards of Hamamatsu, it has by far the largest population. It is bordered by Hamana-ku, Kosai, Shizuoka, and Iwata, Shizuoka.

== History ==
- January 1, 2024 - Former wards of Naka-ku, Higashi-ku, Nishi-ku, Minami-ku, and Mikatagahara District of Kita-ku formed Chūō-ku.
