= Seien Girls' High School =

Location
- 3-20-1 Sato, Naka-ku, Hamamatsu-shi Shizuoka; Japan
- 34°42′51″N 137°45′08″E

Information
- Type: high school
- Established: 1906
- Affiliation: prefectural
- Website: http://www.seien.ed.jp/en/index.php Seien Girls' High School

Seien Girls' High School (静岡県西遠女子学園中学校・高等学校, Shizuoka-ken Seien Joshi Gakuen Chugakkō-Kōkōgakkō) is a private girls' school located in Chūō-ku, Hamamatsu city, Shizuoka Prefecture, Japan. It currently has 1,200 students, 96 teachers and 24,000 graduates.

== History ==
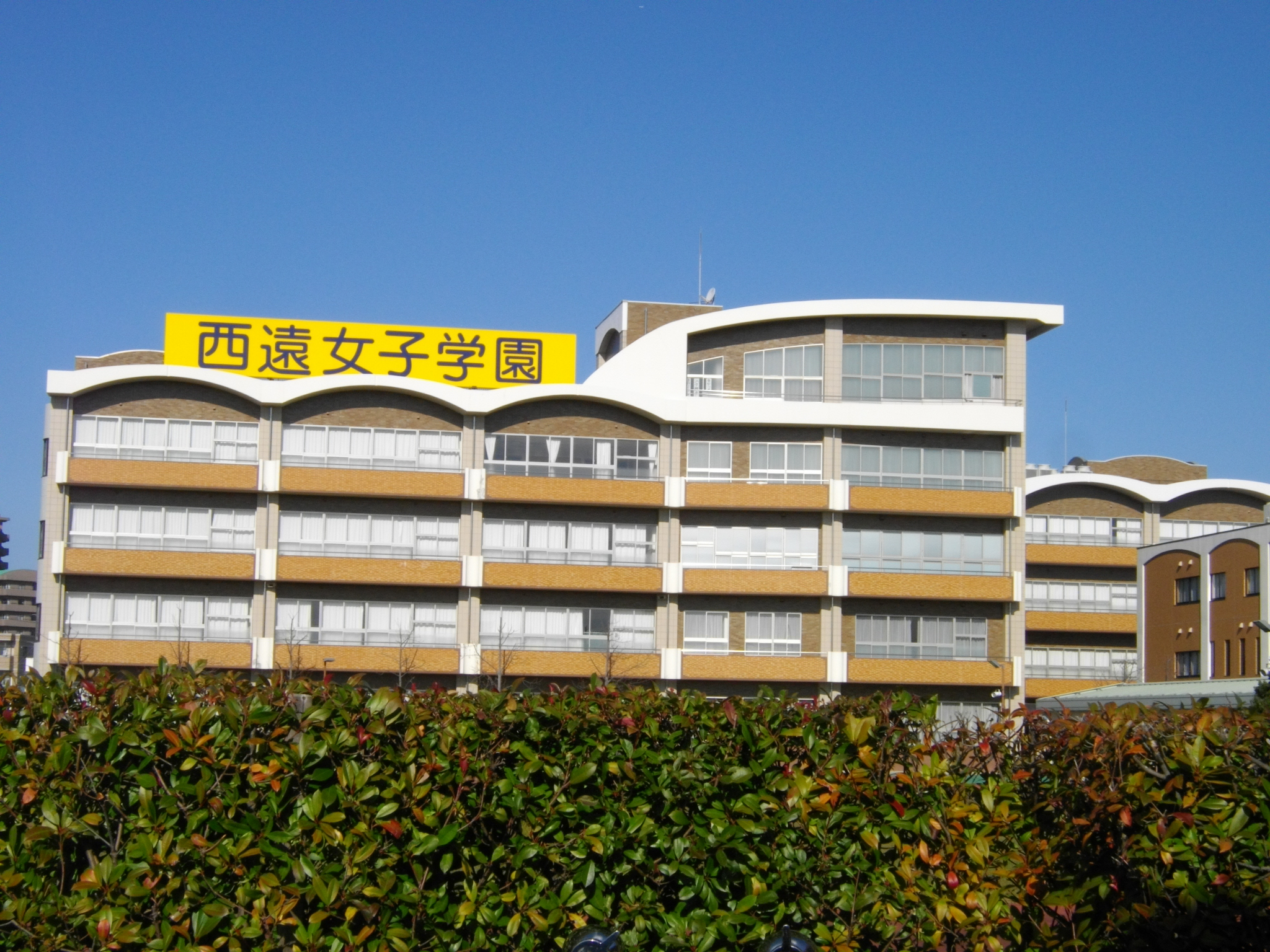
Shizuoka Seien Girls' High School

In 1906, Seien Girls' High School was established by Iwao Okamoto (1867-1942) as a private women's school with the goal of nurturing "excellent mothers", through his principle that "the first education of any great and wise person is his mother." There were 8 teachers and 25 students in the beginning.

== School Symbol ==
The school symbol is a yellow and red ribbon in the shape of an inverted heart. The yellow represents “reason” and red represents “passion”. The shape is curved at the bottom to represent “harmony”, and knotted in the center to show “unity”; the upward pointing tip represents “progress”.

== Characteristics ==
Seien Girls’ High School places a strong emphasis on spiritual education. The martial arts Dojo is not just the hall where techniques are taught, but where the spirit is strengthened. Through an original program, students learn to identify right from wrong, and obtain social manners and true etiquette.

The school, in response to the internationalisation of society, conducts an Australian study tour for all senior students. Students learn to respect other cultures and how to coexist with other nationalities and nature. In preparation for this, in the first year of junior high school, English language conversation classes are held by native English-speaking teachers in addition to regular classes. In the second year of junior high school, each class studies a different theme related to Australia. Also, students can apply for language training and a homestay at Seien’s sister schools, including Annie Wright in Tacoma, Washington, United States, or language training and a homestay in England and Australia.

English and mathematics classes during junior high school are conducted under a system of small groups divided into each course. In the senior year of junior high school, class composition is arranged according to academic ability. In senior high school, a course system has been adopted that provides various original curricula, and guidance so the students can directly get into a university after high school graduation.

Several famous Japanese women are graduates of Seien Girls' School, including Japanese Supermodel Nao Kageyama.
