= Karolina Shiino =

Ukrainian-born Japanese model

- Born: August 24, 1997 (age 28); Ternopil, Ukraine
- Citizenship: Japanese
- Occupation: Model

Karolina Shiino (Japanese: 椎野カロリーナ, romanized: Shiino Karorīna; Ukrainian: Кароліна Шиїно, romanized: Karolina Shyino; born 24 August 1997) is a Japanese model. Born in Ukraine, she moved to Japan with her mother when she was five and became the first naturalised Japanese citizen to win the Miss Nippon beauty pageant. Shiino later declined the title, and her resignation was accepted by the organisers.

== Biography ==
Shiino was born in Ternopil, western Ukraine in 1997 to Ukrainian parents. She moved to Nagoya, Japan, at the age of five when her mother Svitlana married her Japanese step-father. Shiino has said that she feels Japanese in both "speech and mind", but she has stated that she had to regularly endure commentary while she was growing up about how she looked different. Svitlana Shiino is also a model and a winner of multiple contests.

On February 27, 2021, Shiino appeared on "ARIYOSHI'S Meeting for Reviewing", she regretted cheating in her profile. In her profile, she claimed to be trilingual, speaking Japanese, Ukrainian, and Russian, but in reality, she revealed that she could only speak Japanese. She can understand Ukrainian, but is unable to speak it.

== 2024 Miss Nippon Grand Prix ==
In January 2024, Shiino was announced as the winner of the 2024 Miss Nippon Grand Prix beauty pageant. She is the first naturalised Japanese citizen to win the pageant. The pageant's judges were drawn to Shiino's confidence. The pageant's operator said she won the title because she is a hard-working and humble Japanese woman with a strong sense of consideration for others. Her foreign heritage sparked debates over what it means to be "Japanese" and discussions on the demographics of Japan. After winning the pageant, Shiino stated that she was grateful to be accepted as Japanese and said, "I hope to contribute to building a society that respects diversity and is not judgmental about how people look."

=== Revocation of the title Miss Nippon 2024 ===
On January 31, Shūkan Bunshun reported that Shiino was having an affair with a married man. The Miss Nippon Grand Prix organizers initially denied the report as untrue, but on February 5, Shiino admitted to the affair, withdrew her Miss Nippon title, and offered to terminate her contract with her entertainment agency Free Wave Co. In response, the Miss Nippon Grand Prix organizers revoked Shiino's title as Miss Nippon and declared the 2024 Miss Nippon title vacant. In addition, Free Wave Co. agreed to relinquish her contract in a statement from agency president Mutsumi Takahashi CEO on their homepage. On Instagram, Shiino apologized to the wife and family of the doctor with whom she had an affair, as well as to Miss Nippon Grand Prix officials and those who supported her in winning the Miss Nippon title.

== Personal life ==
Shiino received Japanese citizenship in 2022. Her maternal grandmother Maria migrated to Japan in the spring of 2022 as a Ukrainian refugee following the Russian invasion of Ukraine.

== See also ==
- Ariana Miyamoto
- Priyanka Yoshikawa
