= Hideki Seo =

Japanese fashion designer (1974–2024)

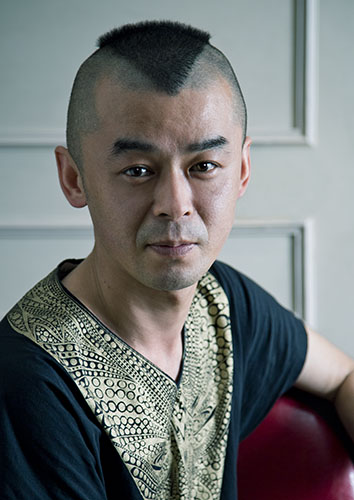
- Seo in 2015
- Born: 10 May 1974; Hiroshima, Japan
- Died: 19 March 2024 (aged 49)
- Education: Kyoto University of Art, section: Graphic Design
- Alma mater: Royal Academy of Fine Arts Fashion department (Antwerp)
- Occupations: Fashion designer, artist
- Years active: 2004–2024
- Website: hidekiseo.net

Hideki Seo (瀬尾 英樹, Seo Hideki; 10 May 1974 – 19 March 2024) was a Japanese-born French fashion designer and artist.

== Biography ==
Hideki Seo was born on 10 May 1974. He graduated from the Royal Academy of Fine Arts, Antwerp after studying visual design at the Kyoto University of Art.

Seo worked as the assistant designer for Azzedine Alaïa in Paris as well as developing his career as an artist. His artworks have been shown in various museums throughout Europe and America in recent years.

Seo died on 21 March 2024,due to an undisclosed illness at the age of 49.

== Exhibitions ==
2015 – Solo exhibition "ON MY WAY – HIDEKI SEO" projects+gallery (Saint-Louise, US)

2013 – "A queen within", World chess hall of fame (Saint-Louise, US)

- Launch of "A queen within" at Christie's New York
- "Rooms 27” ( Tokyo )
- "50 years birthday of Antwerp fashion", at Mode museum (Antwerp)
- "ARRRGH!" Monsters in Fashion", Centraal Museum (Netherlands)
- "ARRRGH!" Monstres de Mode", La Gaîté Lyrique (Paris)

2012 – Solo exhibition "Hideki Seo", Galerie Papelart (Paris)

2011 – "ARRRGH! Monsters in Fashion" by Vasilis Zidianakis of ATOPOS at Benaki Museum (Athens)

2005 – Loveless (Tokyo)

- Rooms 10 (Tokyo)
- Labels inc. (Antwerp)
- Francis (Antwerp)
- Nieuwe Ontwerpers (Rotterdam)
- Side by Side in Laforet Harajuku (Tokyo)

2004 – Usage Externe deux, Collaboration with Kart Stallaert (Brussels)

== Awards ==
- Laureate Prize of the magazine Week-end Knack
- Laureate Grand Prize of 'Perfume project IFF New York'
- Laureate Fashion week Brussels, Grand Prize by magazine Le Vif/L'Express

== Publications ==
- HIDEKI SEO (ISBN 978-2-7466-7161-4, 2014)
