= Susumu Yamaguchi =

Japanese scholar

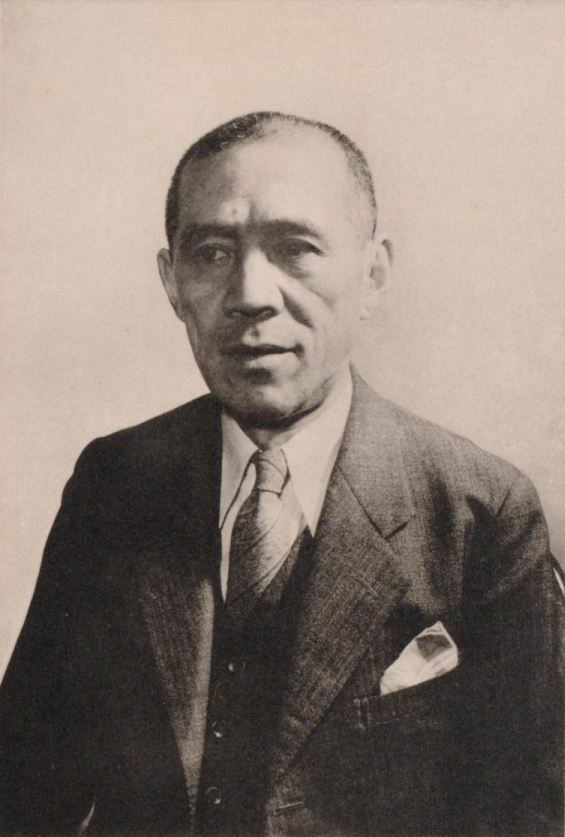
- Portrait of Susumu Yamaguchi
- Born: January 27, 1895; Japan Kyoto
- Died: October 21, 1976 (aged 81)
- Resting place: Kyoto
- Other name: 山口 益
- Occupations: Buddhist, scholars of Buddhism

Susumu Yamaguchi (山口 益, Yamaguchi Susumu) (27 January 1895 - 21 October 1976) was a Japanese scholar of Buddhism, and former president of Otani University. He was born in Kyoto.

== Biography ==
Susumu Yamaguchi was born in Kyoto. He studied Buddhism at Shinshu Ōtani College (Ōtani University). He completed the graduate course there, and became an assistant professor at his alma mater in 1924. From 1927 to 1929, Yamaguchi studied in France for studying the Indian philosophy and Buddhist philosophy. He concentrated on researching the texts written by Sanskrit and Tibetan languages.

He was promoted to a professor of Ōtani University in 1934. He also taught at Kyoto Imperial University from next year. In 1943, he submitted his doctoral dissertation to Kyoto Imperial University. The title was "Dialogue of nothing and existence in Buddhism"(仏教に於ける無と有との対論). He served as the fifteenth principal of Ōtani University (1950-1958). He worked at Ōtani University by his retirement in 1964. As a Buddhist, he served as a Director of the Institute of Buddhism propagandism, Shinshu Ōtani-ha.

He was selected as an honoured member of the Société Asiatique in 1957, and was a member of the Japan Academy after 1965.

== Honer ==
- Medals of Honor (Japan) (the Purple Ribbon) (1962).
- Person of Cultural Merit (1964).

== Academic contribution ==
He promoted research about Mahâyâna Buddhism from the side of Tibetan Tripiṭaka text. In its proposal, the Suzuki Foundation for Cultural Research published from 1955 to 1961, photographic facsimiles of the Tibetan Tripitaka Beijing version, and Studies of Tibetan Buddhism on Mahâyâna Buddhism in India after Tibetan-language documents.

== Sourses ==
- "Memories of Susumu Yamaguchi (Portrait, Biography, and list of works)" (山口益先生を偲ぶ[含略歴・著作目録])
