= Nishi-ku, Hamamatsu =

Nishi 西区
- Ward
- Nishi Ward
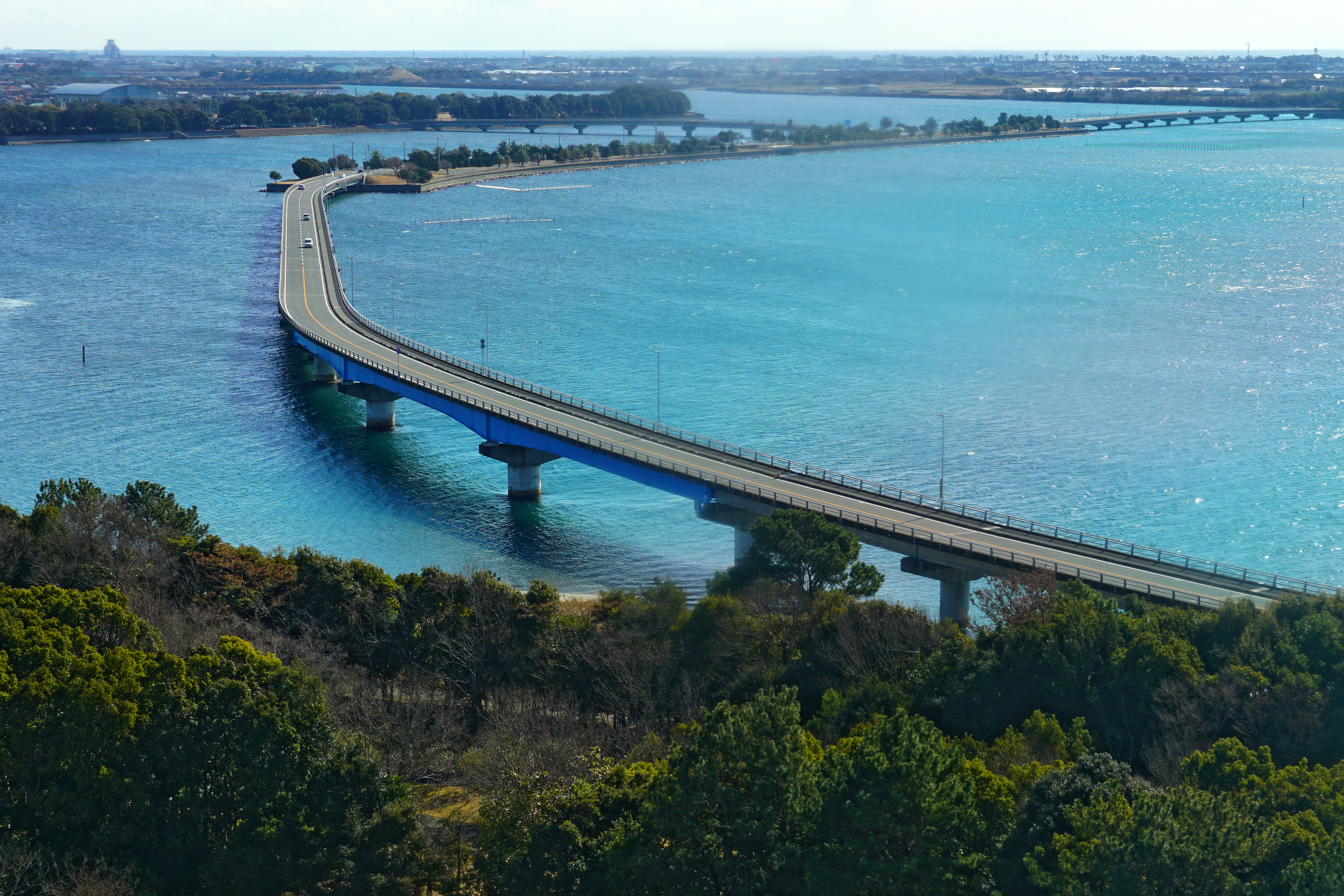
- Lake Hamana and Hamanako Road Bridge

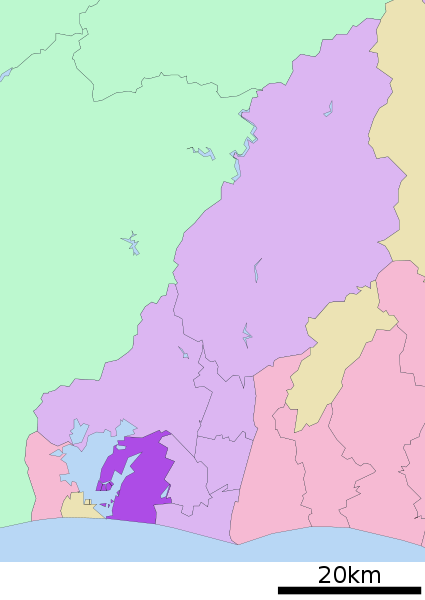
- Location of Nishi-ku in Shizuoka

- Coordinates: 34°41′33.77″N 137°38′43.2″E
- Country: Japan
- Region: Chūbu
- Prefecture: Shizuoka
- City: Hamamatsu

Area
  - Total: 114.71 km^{2} (44.29 sq mi)

Population (December 1, 2019)
  - Total: 108,501
  - Density: 945.87/km^{2} (2,449.8/sq mi)
- Time zone: UTC+9 (Japan Standard Time)
- Phone number: 053-597-1111
- Address: 1-31-1 Yūtō, Nishi-ku, Hamamatsu, Shizuoka 431-0193
- Website: Nishi-ku home page

Nishi-ku (西区, Nishi-ku) was a ward in Hamamatsu, Shizuoka, Japan, located in the southwest corner of the city. It is bordered by Naka-ku, Kita-ku, Minami-ku, and the city of Kosai. The 3rd largest ward of Hamamatsu in terms of area, much of the ward is still rural, with farms and rice fields.

Nishi-ku was created on April 1, 2007 when Hamamatsu became a city designated by government ordinance (a "designated city").

Nishi-ku is served by Maisaka Station and Bentenjima Station on the Tōkaidō Main Line railway.

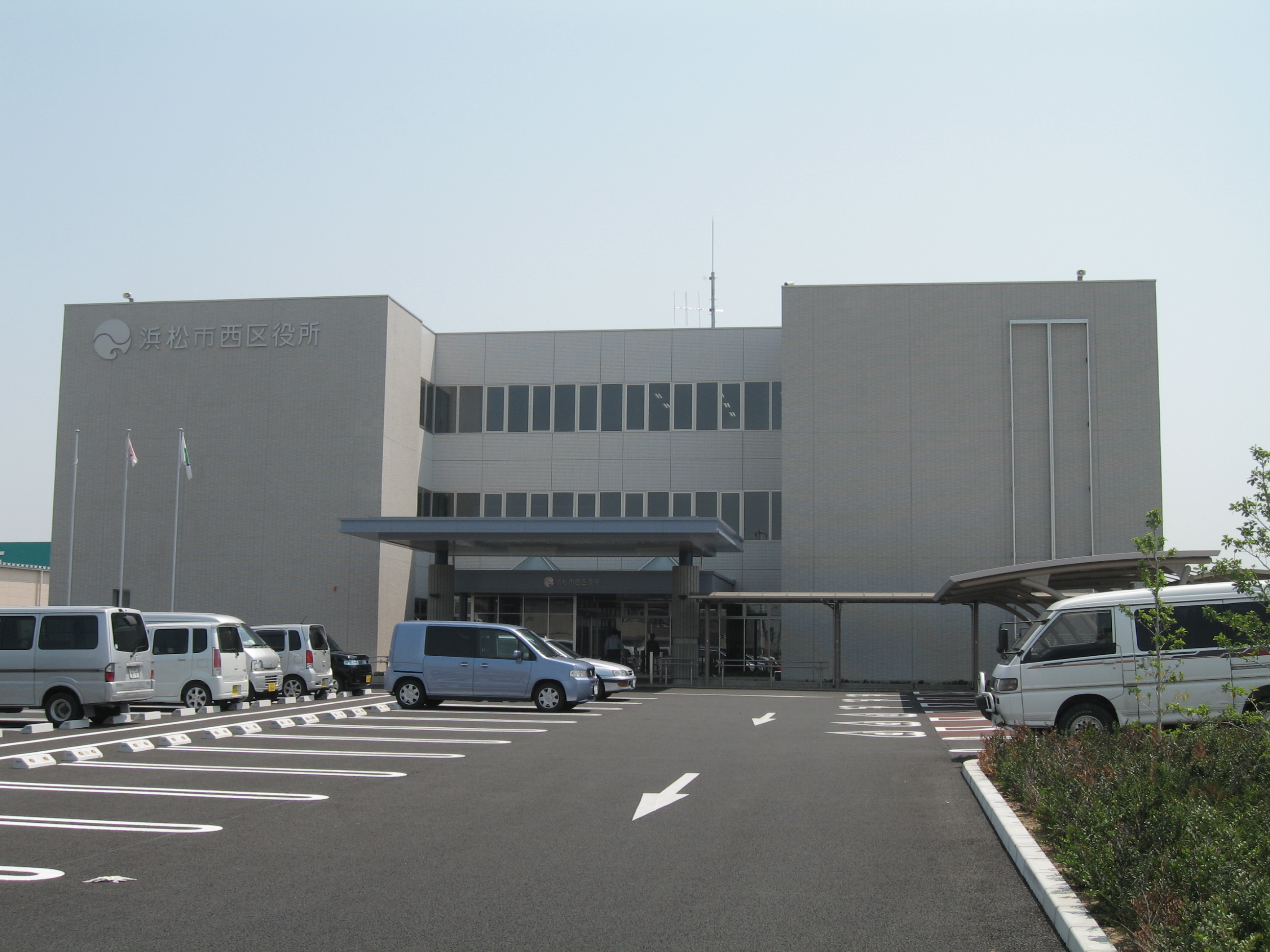
Nishi Ward Office, Hamamatsu

== Education ==
International schools:

- Mundo de Alegria - Peruvian school (ペルー学校) and Brazilian primary school
