= Naka-ku, Hamamatsu =

Naka 中区
- Ward
- Naka Ward
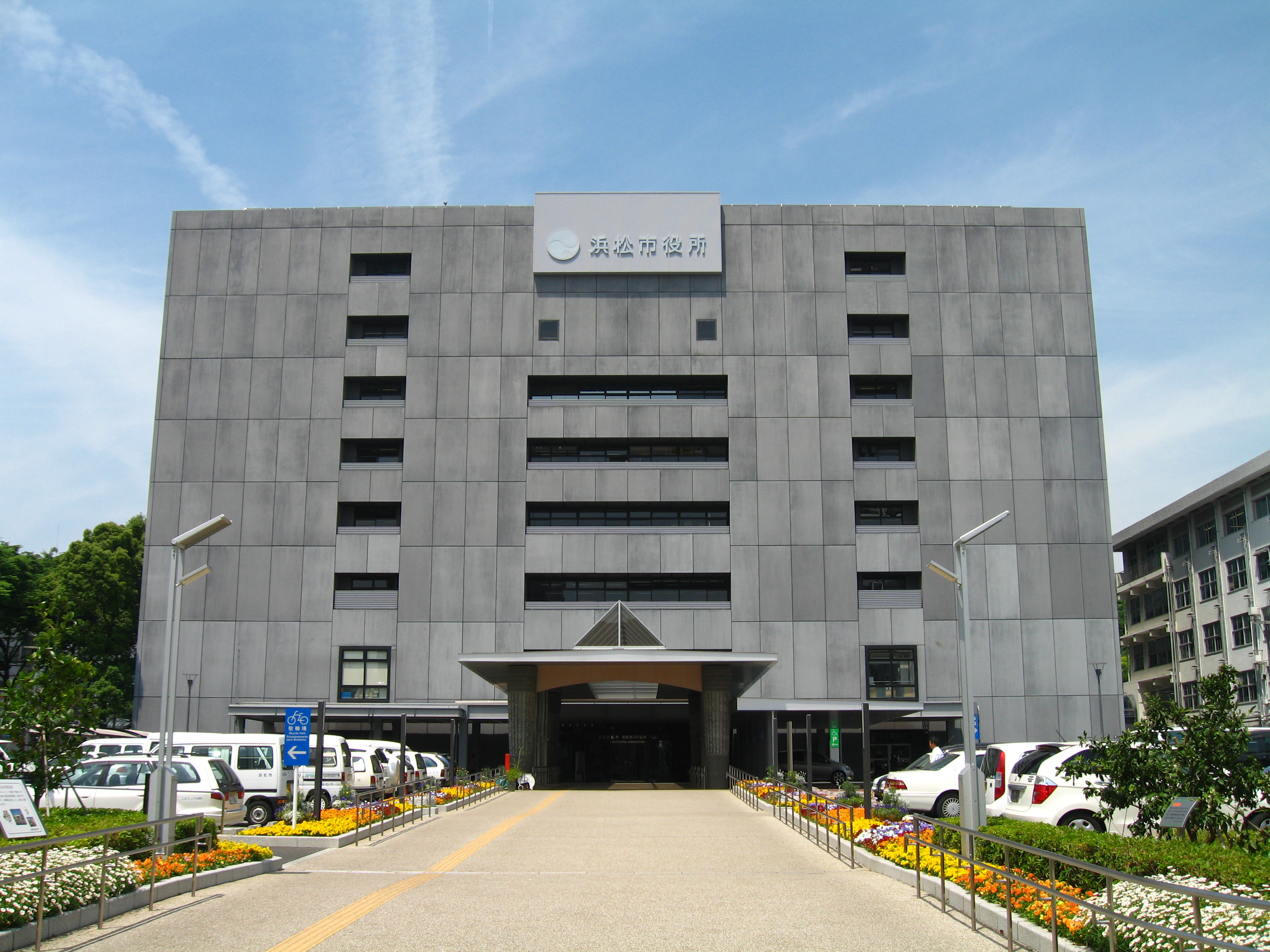
- Naka Ward Office

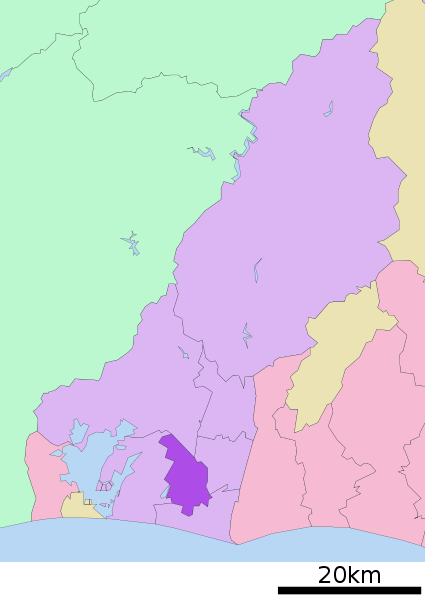
- Location of Naka-ku in Shizuoka

- Coordinates: 34°42′38.9″N 137°43′33.9″E
- Country: Japan
- Region: Chūbu
- Prefecture: Shizuoka
- City: Hamamatsu

Area
  - Total: 44.34 km^{2} (17.12 sq mi)

Population (December 1, 2019)
  - Total: 235,097
  - Density: 5,302/km^{2} (13,730/sq mi)
- Time zone: UTC+9 (Japan Standard Time)
- Phone number: 053-457-2111
- Address: 103-2 Motoshiro-cho, Naka-ku, Hamamatsu-shi, Shizuoka-ken 430-8652
- Website: www.city.hamamatsu.shizuoka.jp/ward/nakaku/index.html

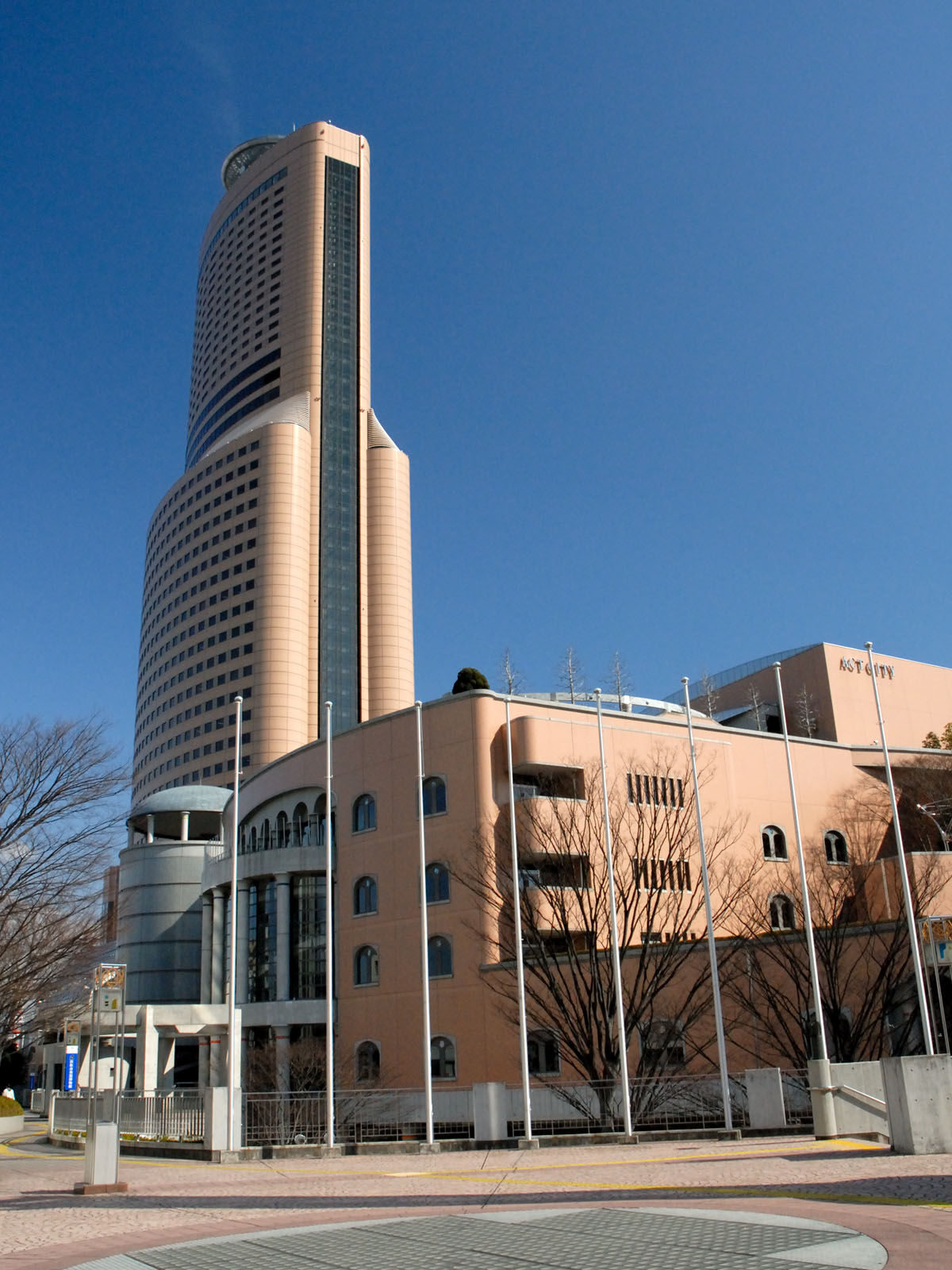
ACT Tower, the headquarters of Enkei Corporation

Naka-ku (中区, Naka-ku) was a ward in Hamamatsu, Shizuoka, Japan, located in the central part of the city. It encompasses the site of Hamamatsu Castle and Hamamatsu Station, the central business district and a number of high density residential areas. Although its area is the smallest of the seven wards of Hamamatsu, it has the largest population. It is bordered by Higashi-ku, Kita-ku, Minami-ku, and Nishi-ku.

Naka-ku was created on April 1, 2007 when Hamamatsu became a city designated by government ordinance (a "designated city").

== Education ==
Seien Girls' High School is located in the area.

International schools:

- Escola Brasil (former Escola Brasileira de Hamamatsu) - Brazilian school

== Economy ==
=== Corporate headquarters ===
- Hamamatsu Photonics, a global manufacturer of optoelectronic components and systems
- Enkei Corporation, a motorcycle and passenger car wheel manufacturer
