= Kita-ku, Hamamatsu =

Kita 北区
- Ward
- Kita Ward
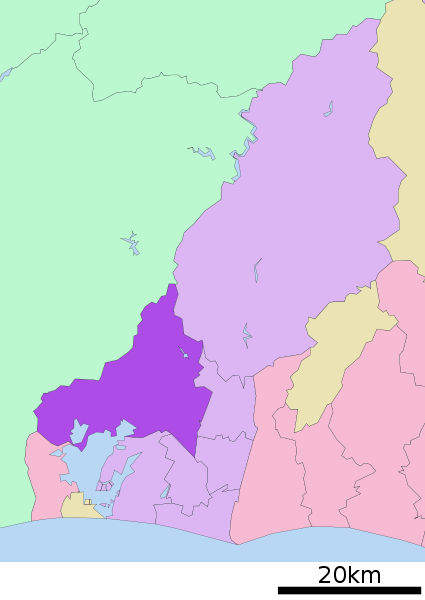
- Location of Kita-ku in Shizuoka

- Coordinates: 34°49′04″N 137°44′23″E
- Country: Japan
- Region: Chūbu
- Prefecture: Shizuoka
- City: Hamamatsu

Area
  - Total: 295.54 km^{2} (114.11 sq mi)

Population (December 1, 2019)
  - Total: 92,902
  - Density: 314.35/km^{2} (814.15/sq mi)
- Time zone: UTC+9 (Japan Standard Time)
- Phone number: 053-523-1111
- Address: 305 Kiga Hosoe-cho, Kita-ku, Hamamatsu, Shizuoka 431-1395
- Website: Kita-ku home page

Kita-ku (北区, Kita-ku) was a ward in Hamamatsu, Shizuoka, Japan, located in the north of the city. It is bordered by Tenryū-ku to the north, Higashi-ku and Naka-ku to the east, Hamakita-ku Minami-ku and Kosai to the south, and the cities of Toyohashi and Shinshiro to the west. It is largely a residential suburb of central Hamamatsu, and a considerable portion of the ward is forested.

Kita-ku was created on April 1, 2007 when Hamamatsu became a city designated by government ordinance (a "designated city"). It consists of the former towns of Inasa, Hosoe and Mikkabi, which had already merged into Hamamatsu in 2005. In 2009, it had a population of 95,419 in an area of 277.63 km², with a population density of 344 persons per km².

Kita-ku is served by 14 stations on the Tenryū Hamanako Railroad Tenryū Hamanako Line railway.

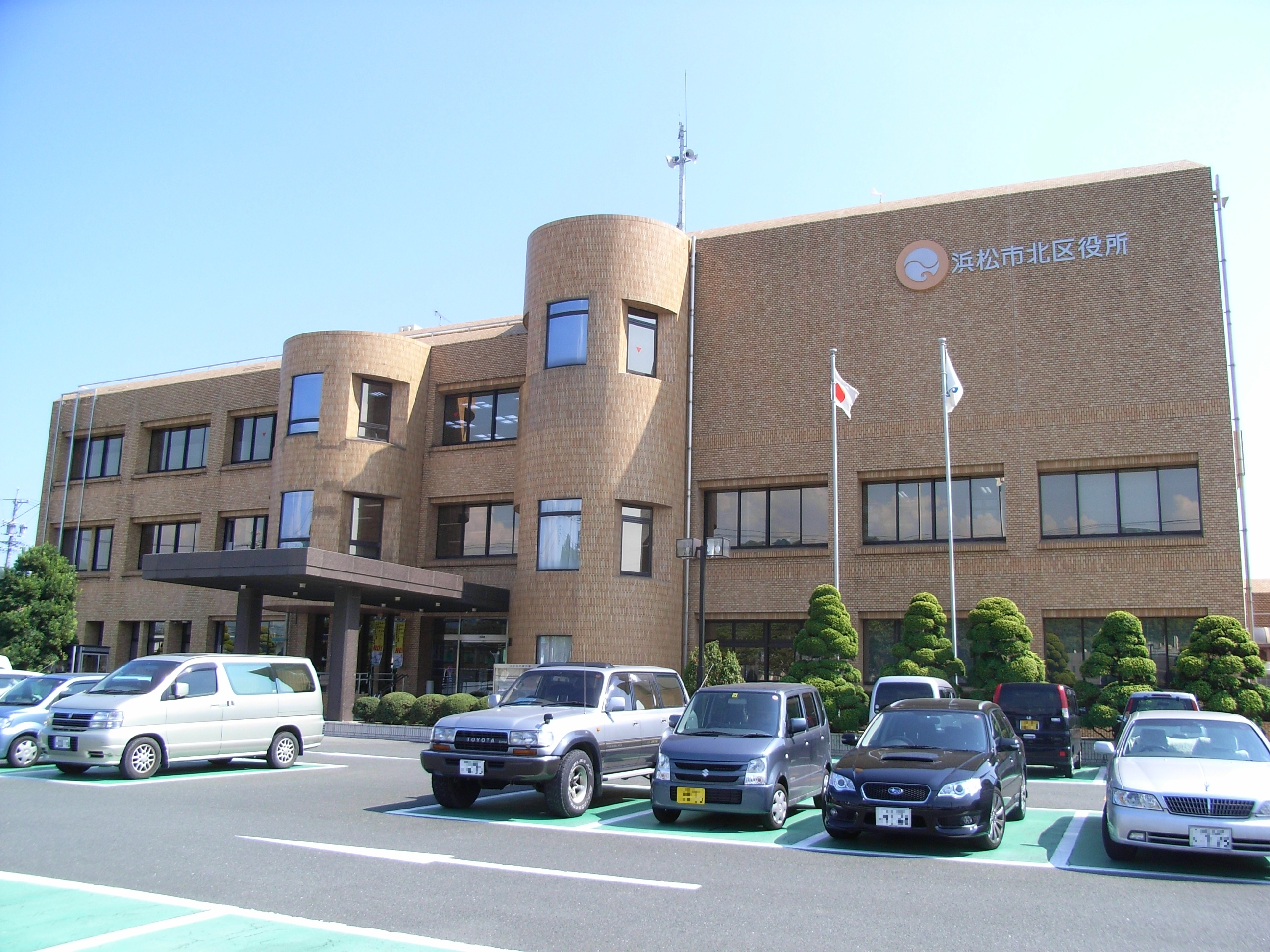
Kita Ward Office, Hamamatsu
