= Higashi-ku, Hamamatsu =

Higashi 東区
- Ward
- Higashi Ward
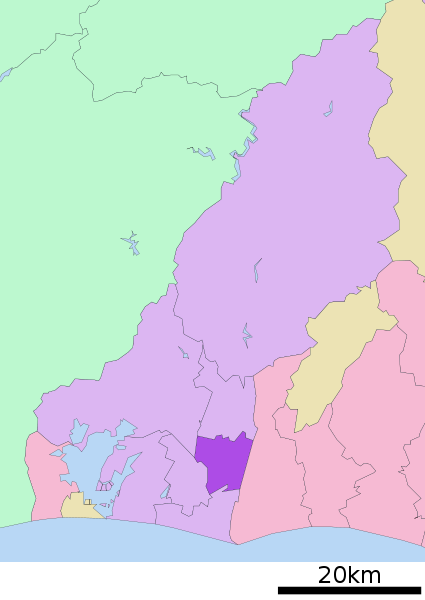
- Location of Higashi-ku in Shizuoka

- Coordinates: 34°44′29″N 137°47′30″E
- Country: Japan
- Region: Chūbu
- Prefecture: Shizuoka
- City: Hamamatsu

Area
  - Total: 46.29 km^{2} (17.87 sq mi)

Population (December 1, 2019)
  - Total: 129,287
  - Density: 2,793/km^{2} (7,234/sq mi)
- Time zone: UTC+9 (Japan Standard Time)
- Phone number: 053-424-0111
- Address: 20-3 Ryutsu-motomachi, Higashi-ku, Hamamatsu 435-8686
- Website: Higashi-ku home page

Higashi-ku (東区, Higashi-ku) was a ward in Hamamatsu, Japan, located in the east-central part of the city. It is the second smallest of the seven wards of Hamamatsu in terms of area, after Naka-ku. It is bordered by Hamakita-ku, Kita-ku, Minami-ku, and Naka-ku.

Higashi-ku was created on April 1, 2007, when Hamamatsu became a city designated by government ordinance (a "designated city").

Higashi-ku is served by Tenryūgawa Station on the Tōkaidō Main Line, and by Jidōsha-Gakkō-Mae Station, Saginomiya Station, Sekishi Station and Enshū-Nishigasaki Station on the Enshū Railway Line.

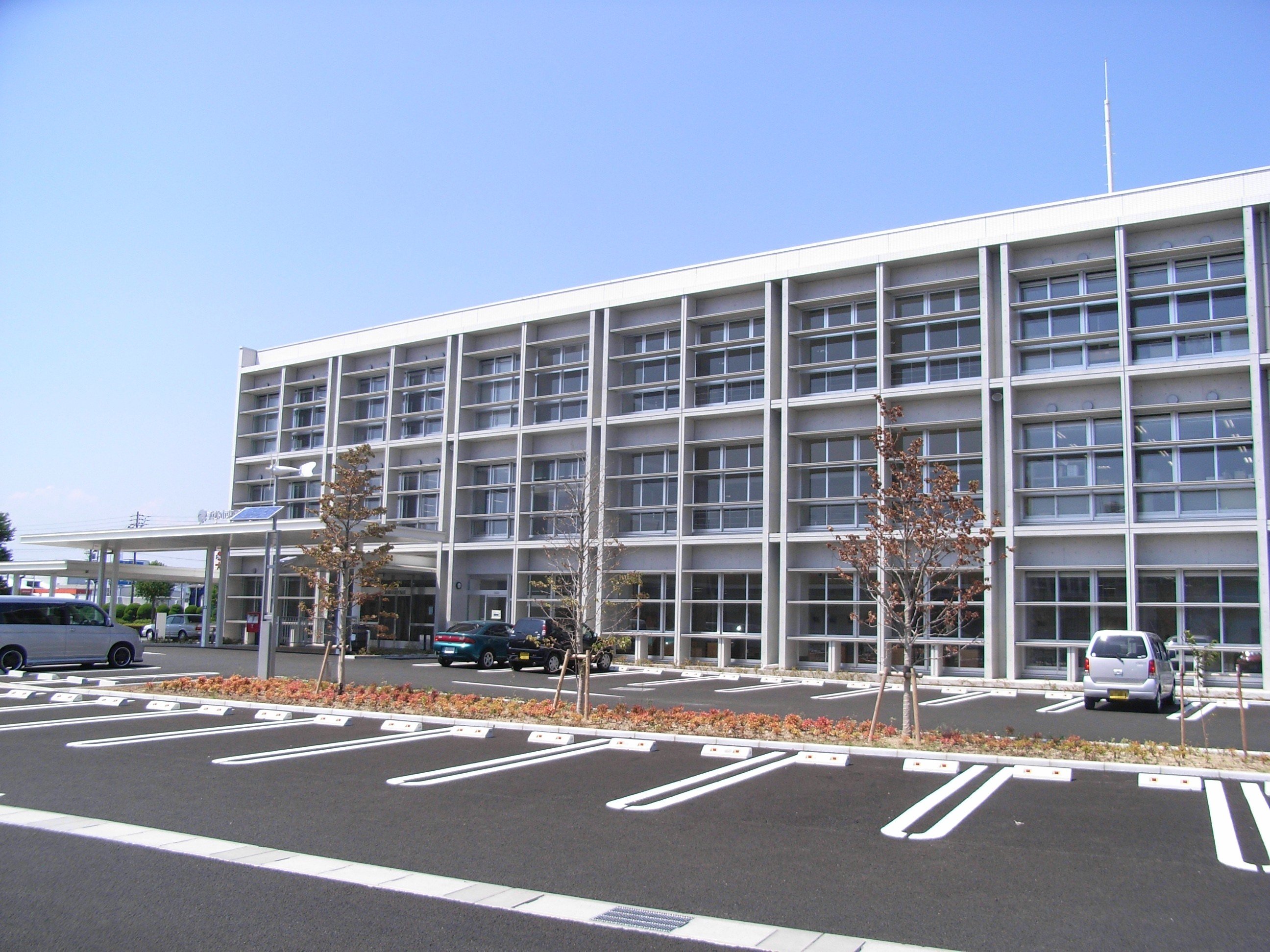
Higashi Ward Office, Hamamatsu

== Education ==
The Hamamatsu campus of Escola Alegria de Saber, a network of Brazilian international schools, is in Higashi-ku.
