= Minami-ku, Hamamatsu =

Minami 南区
- Ward
- Minami Ward
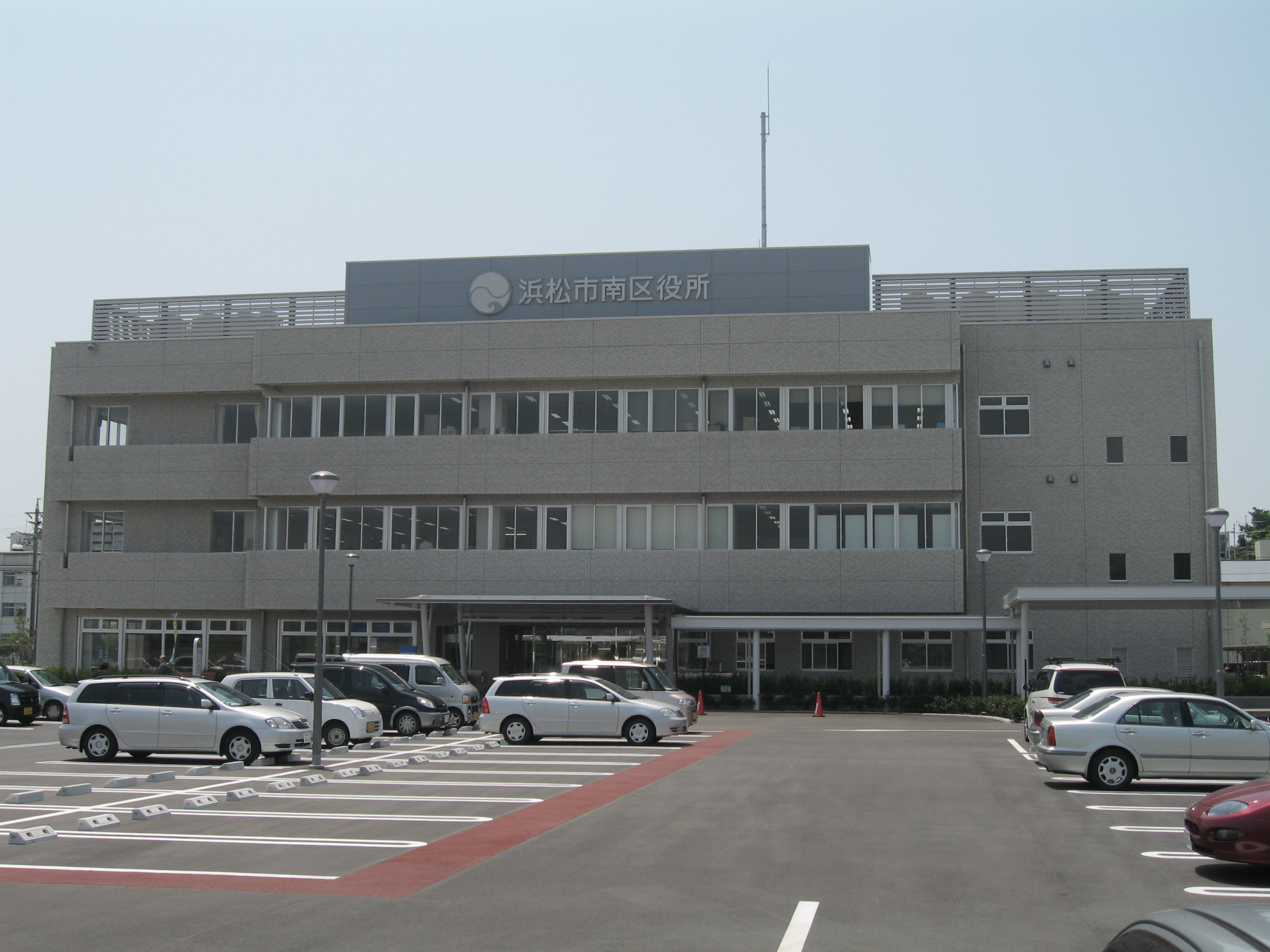
- Minami Ward Office, Hamamatsu

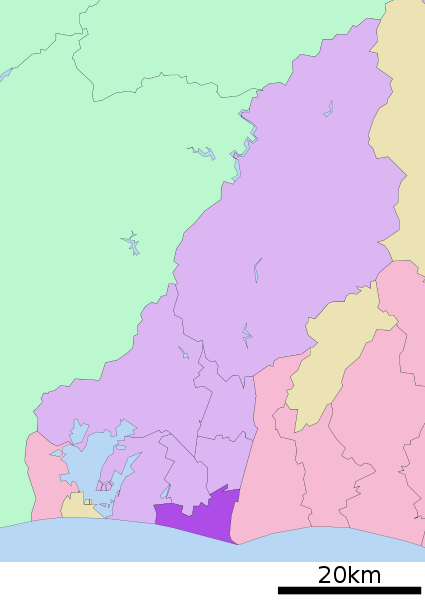
- Location of Minami-ku in Shizuoka

- Coordinates: 34°40′02″N 137°45′8″E
- Country: Japan
- Region: Chūbu
- Prefecture: Shizuoka
- City: Hamamatsu

Area
  - Total: 46.84 km^{2} (18.09 sq mi)

Population (December 1, 2019)
  - Total: 100,214
  - Density: 2,139/km^{2} (5,541/sq mi)
- Time zone: UTC+9 (Japan Standard Time)
- Phone number: 053-425-1111
- Address: 600-1 Enoshima-cho, Minami-ku, Hamamatsu, Shizuoka 430-0898
- Website: Minami-ku home page

Minami-ku (南区, Minami-ku) was a ward in Hamamatsu, Shizuoka, Japan, located in the south of the city. It is bordered by Naka-ku, Higashi-ku, Nishi-ku, and the city of Iwata and Pacific Ocean. It has the fifth largest area and the fourth largest population of the seven wards of Hamamatsu. Much of Minami-ku is still rural, with farms and rice fields.

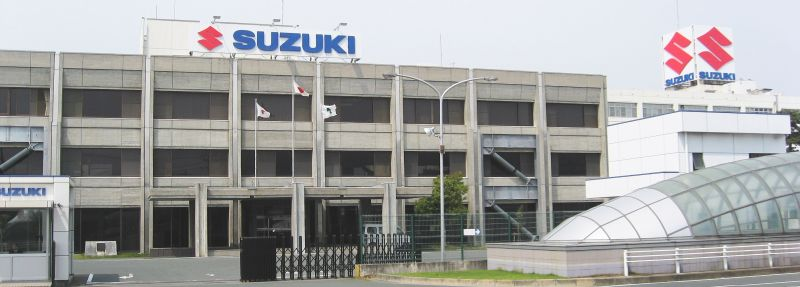
Suzuki headquarters

Minami-ku was created on April 1, 2007, when Hamamatsu became a city designated by government ordinance (a "designated city").

Minami-ku is served by Takatsuka Station on the Tōkaidō Main Line railway.

Suzuki has its headquarters in Minami-ku.
