= Kunekune (urban legend) =

Japanese Urban Legend of a white figure

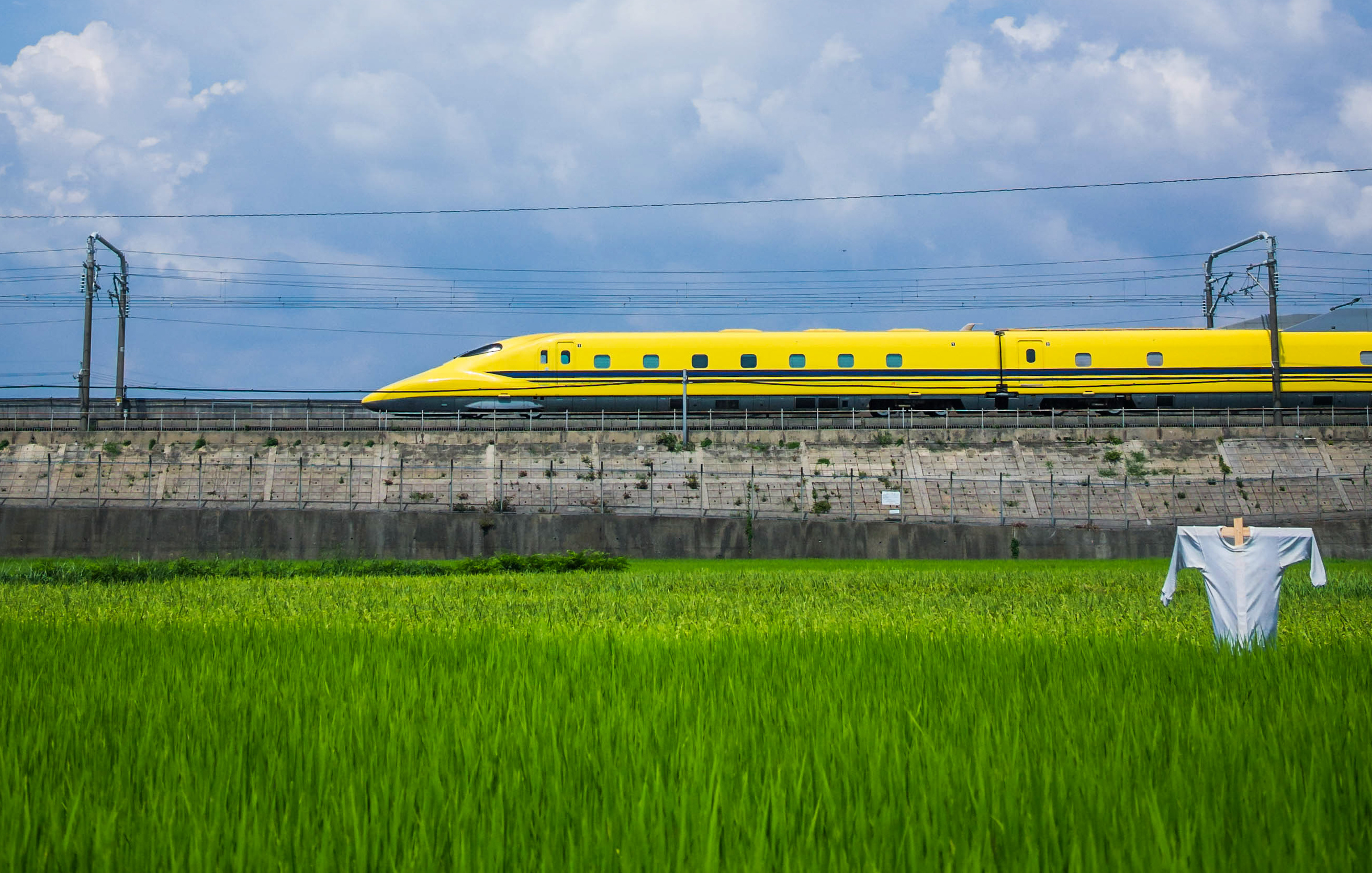
Alleged sightings of the Kunekune in fields may be the result of confusion with scarecrows.

In modern Japanese folklore, the Kunekune (くねくね; 'wriggling body') is a fictional being typically described as having a slender, white, paper (or fabric-like) humanoid shape, which is usually said to appear in fields on hot summer days.

The story originated on the Internet as a Japanese urban legend, being first mentioned on websites in 2001. Its name, Kunekune, is derived from its alleged behavior of wiggling its limbs. The Kunekune may be explained by people being confused by the appearance of scarecrows or wick drains.

== Description ==
The Kunekune is said to resemble a slender, white humanoid shape, like a paper mannequin or a piece of fine fabric. It is said that the being can be found at lunchtime during hot summer days. The Kunekune lingers in widely extended rice fields or acres, in rare cases it might be found over the open sea. Its limbs are said to wiggle permanently, as if there was a straight gust of wind, even if it was a windless day. This behaviour gave the being the Japanese name "Kunekune", meaning "to twist", "to wiggle" or "to meander".

== Background ==
Kunekune first appeared in a short horror story posted on 2channel in 2001. The story was well-received on 2channel, inspiring other users to share their own similar stories. Kunekune stories are all written in the first-person singular in an attempt to make them look like eyewitness reports. A similar phenomenon can be observed with the case of both the Slender Man and Hanako-san.

The appearance of the Kunekune may be the result of confusion with traditional scarecrows, which are found in fields of rice and barley, textile deity (タンモノ様, Tanmono-Sama), or snake worship, like Hasshaku-sama (八尺様, Eight Feet Tall). It could also possibly be a mis-identification of wick drains. Another possible explanation might be thick clouds of fog, which tend to appear over rice fields during lunchtime. A third possibility might be hallucinations, created by heat stroke and dehydration during hot summer days.
