= List of Kaiketsu Zorori characters =

These are the many characters from Kaiketsu Zorori by Yutaka Hara.

== Main Characters and Special Status ==
Zorori (ゾロリ)

Voiced by: Koichi Yamadera (Japanese, TV series); Russell Wait (English, TV series), Jack Murphy (English, singing)., Carlos Alazraqui (English)

The fox protagonist of the story and a wanted criminal (after Arrested!! (つかまる!!, Tsukamaru!!)). He keeps traveling with the goal of becoming the King of Pranks (悪戯の王者, Itazura no Ōja), finding a beautiful bride, and getting his own castle.

=== Zorori's Apprentices ===
Ishishi (イシシ)/ Voiced by: Rikako Aikawa (Japanese, TV series), Masako Nozawa (Japanese, TV series; temporary, February–April 2006); Candice Moore (English, TV series)

The older of the boar twins with the deeper voice.

Noshishi (ノシシ)/ Voiced by: Motoko Kumai (Japanese, TV series), Sanae Kobayashi (Japanese, TV series; temporary, January 2007); Muriel Hofmann (English, TV series)

The younger of the boar twins with the higher voice. He also has a mole on his right cheek.

=== Zorori's Family ===
Zororene (ゾロリーヌ, Zororīnu)

Zorori's mother. Zorori promised her that he would accomplish his goals. She now resides in Heaven.

Zorondo Ron (ゾロンド・ロン)

A treasure hunter and biplane pilot. He's implied to be Zorori's father.

=== Creators ===
Yutaka Hara (原ゆたか, Hara Yutaka)/ Voiced by: himself

The creator of Kaiketsu Zorori, Yutaka Hara appears in every episode, often in the background.

Kyoko Hara (原京子, Hara Kyōko) Voiced by: herself

The wife of Yutaka Hara. She appears in the movies.

== Demon School ==
Demon School Teacher (妖怪学校の先生, Yōkai Gakkō no Sensei)

Yōkai-sensei for short. He teaches different monsters and demons how to scare people. Like Zorori, he debuted in Hōrensō Man

=== Students ===
Dracula (ドラキュラ, Dorakyura)

During the day, he transports via a coffin. He tries to overcome his repulsion to garlic.

Werewolf (オオカミ男, Ookamiotoko)

An already canid man who becomes more beastly and canid during a full moon. He wears a green jacket and has a round nose. In the anime, there are two other wolfmen; one with a yellow jacket and square nose and another with a purple jacket and triangle nose.

Mummy (ミイラおとこ, Miiraotoko)

A mummy covered in bandages.

Gorgon (ゴーゴン, Gōgon)

She wears shades.

Kaminari Youngster (カミナリこぞう, Kaminarikozō; Thunder Kid)

A raijin who wasn't fond of Zorori at first but then grew to like him.

The Kappas (カッパたち, Kappa-tachi)

Kappas dressed as Hanako-san. They're part of the soccer team.

Giant Octopus (大ダコにゅうどう, Ōdakonyūdō; Giant Octopus)

An octopus monster in the soccer team.

Nurikabe (ぬりかべ, Nurikabe)

The soccer team's goalie.

Hyakume (百目, Hyakume; One Hundred Eyes)

An orange blob like creature with many eyes.

Mokumokuren (もくもくれん, Momokuren)

He has poor eyesight and uses contacts.

Azukitogi (小豆とぎ, Azuki Togi)

She scares people with the sound of her azuki beans.

Akaname (あかなめ, Akaname)

He licks grime with his tongue.

Ōnyūdō (大入道, Giant Nyūdō)

He used to be 10 meters tall, but now he's small and shriveled.

Kamanari Elder (カミナリ じじい, Kaminari Jijī; Thunder Elder)

An elderly raijin who used to make lightning of a million volts.

Yuki-onna (雪女, Yuki-onna)

Due to change in climate, she lost her ability to scare people. She's scarier as her face whitens. She is also a big fan of Zorori.

Rokurokubi (ろくろくび, Rokurokubi)

Junk food made her neck fat.

Kumo onna (クモおんな, Kumo onna; Spider woman)

Pollution made her webs less sticky and more breakable. She eats nattou to help solve this.

Karakasa (カラカサ, Karakasa)

Her floral pattern looks like eyes in the dark.

Ittan-momen (一反木綿, Ittan-momen)

Freddy (フレディ, Furedi)

A cowardly kappa.

Freddy's lover (フレディの恋人, Furedi no Koibito)

Freddy's girlfriend who helps Freddy become less cowardly.

=== Restores ===
The school's baseball team. They spent three consecutive years at the lowest rank of the Monster Major League.

Nomonoke (ノモノケ)

A mononoke capable of pitching the ball at more than 200 km/h, but can't control them.

Takaoshihappon (タコあし８本, Tako-ashi happon; 8 Octopus Legs)

An octopus monster who bats with three hands. His appendages do not work well.

Kubinaga (くびなが, Long Neck)

He extends his neck to keep track of the ball, but never catches the ball because his arms do not extend.

Coolo (コオロー, Koorō; To freeze)

A batter with a 40% batting average. He will not hit if he gets cold. His breath can freeze things.

Gojimatsu (ゴジまつ, Gojimatsu)

He's only interested in making home runs and only bats when he gets the chance.

Others

These players were absent during the events of Book 33 due to injuries.

- Pochi Puma (ポチ・ピューマ)

- Shén Móshén (神魔神)

- Hiyasegawa (ひやあせがわ)

- Snake (へびしんじょう)

- Wabishī (わびしい)

=== Originally from Hōrensō Man ===
In the anime, they appear in the three part finale of Season 2.

Water Demon (水妖怪, Mizu-yōkai)

His entire body is a liquid substance.

Potato Demon (芋妖怪, Imo-yōkai)

A short brown cat like creature.

Octopus Demon (蛸妖怪, Tako-yōkai)

He walks on six limbs. He uses four limbs as arms. He has several around his head.

Puramoderā (プラモデラー, Puramodera; Plastic Modeler)

Gurincho (グルリンチョ, Gurincho)

Karahirin (カラヒリン, Karahirin)

A chef with long fangs.

Bakuhatsudā (バクハツダー, Bakuhatsudā)

A three eyed eight armed monster with a beret.

== Secondary Characters ==
=== Books 1-10 ===
Arthur (アーサー, Āsā)

A panther prince who marries Elzie.

Princess Elzie (エルゼ姫, Eruze-hime)

Princess of Levanna Country.

King of Levanna Country (レバンナ国の王様, Rebanna-koku no Ōsama)

Father of Elzie.

Buran (ブラン)

A bulldog who runs an oden stand.

Zorori Dragon (ゾロリドラゴン)

A robot dragon used for Zorori's scheme in capturing Elzie and luring Arthur.

Mayor (町長)

A hippopotamus mayor. He was initially pleased with the yokai.

Pyonsi (ピョンシー)

A giant robot modeled after a jiangshi.

The Wizard (魔法使い, Mahōtsukai)

A wizard who uses a magic rod to terrorize a town. He is later revealed to be a tanuki child.

- Kōmorigasa (コーモリガサ, Kōmorigasa; Umbrella Bat)

A bat (kōmori (コーモリ)) the wizard combined with an umbrella (kōmorigasa (こうもり傘)).

- Kabankaba (カバンカバ, Kabankaba; Bag Hippo)

A hippo (kaba (カバ)) the wizard combined with a bag (kaban (鞄)). In the 1993 movie, the hippo was male, but female in the anime series.

- Risurippa (リスリッパ, Risurippa; Squirrel Slipper)

A squirrel (risu (リス)) the wizard combined with a slipper (surippa (スリッパ)).

- Nezumimizu (ネズミミズ, Nezumimizu; Mouse Earthworm)

A mouse (nezumi (鼠)) the wizard combined with an earthworm (mimizu (蚯蚓)).

- Pantsunda (パンツンダ, Patsunda; Underwear Panda)

A panda (パンダ) the wizard combined with underwear (pantsu (パンツ)).

Paru (パル)

The son of a pirate captain. When he was first introduced he was a lion cub, but for the rest of the series he is a teenager. He has his own toy car store.

Ship Captain (船長, Senchō)

Paru's father.

Tiger (タイガー, Taigā)

Paru's former first mate. He committed mutiny and became the pirate captain. His left hand is mechanical.

Pirate Henchmen

The Ship Captain's henchmen, but after the captain is killed off, they become Tiger's henchmen.

Creatures of the Ghost Ship

- Sea Urchin (うにぼうず, Unibōzu)

A creature wearing a cloth with sea urchins attached. He can launch them.

- Electric Jellyfish (でんきくらげ, Denkikurage)

Jellyfish that resemble bowls of ramen.

- Giant Kappa (大がっぱ, Ōgappa)

A large kappa with a dish that functions as a buzz saw.

- Zombies (ゾンビ, Zombi; Zombie)

Zombies in a filthy bath.

Duke Bull (ブルル公爵, Bururu-kōshaku)

A bulldog who is also a candy mogul. He always holds contests with fabulous prizes to increase candy sales. He also finds loopholes to prevent Zorori from getting his prize.

Kobull (コブル)

Duke Bull's assistant. He often rubs his hands together and says "yes, yes" (はいはい, haihai).

Shirodaruman (シロダルマン)

A robot Duke Bull used against Zorori. It uses snow to make icicle missiles.

Dinosaur Mama (恐竜のママ, Kyōrū no Mama)

A dinosaur residing on a remote island.

Dinosaur Kid (恐竜のぼうや, Kyōrū no Bōya)

Son of Dinosaur Mama. He was kidnapped by Mojara.

Mojara (モジャラ)

A ringmaster bear.

Fox Family

Three foxes living in a house at the top of a steep hill.

- Fox Baby (キツネのあかちゃん, Kitsune no Aka-chan)

A baby Zorori, Ishishi, and Noshishi saved and looked after.

- Fox Mother (キツネのママ, Kitsune no Mama)

She worries a lot for her son.

- Fox Father (キツネのパパ, Kitsune no Papa)

He wears a suit and glasses.

Steller's sea eagle (オオワシ, Ōwashi)

An eagle that rescues Zorori and the boars from a ravine.

Monster (怪獣, Kaijū)

The last of his kind, this monster wreaks havoc on a city, but then goes to live with Dinosaur Mama.

Rabbit Gossip Announcer (うさぎみみのアナウンサー)

A rabbit news reporter.

=== Books 11-20 ===
Aliens

- Alien Princess (宇宙人のお姫様, Uchūjin no Ohime-sama)

An alien princess who wants to marry Zorori.

- Alien King (宇宙人の王様, Uchūjin no Ō-sama)

Father of the Alien Princess.

- Alien Queen (宇宙人のお妃様)

Mother of Alien Princess.

- Chairman (議長)

He and Vice Chairman were tasked with finding Zorori.

- Vice Chairman (副議長)

He enjoys playing with action figures.

Space Animals

- Gogerovech (ゴゲロベッチ, Gogerobecchi)

They fire poisonous needles.

- Unjaroge (ウンジャロゲ)

They stomp victims with their large feet.

- Bicharapo (ビッチャラポ)

They spray poisonous liquid.

- Barigari (バリガリ)

They can chew anything with their large mouth with teeth.

Santas

- Suzuki (すずきサンタ)

A Santa who recorded good deeds of a child, which was seen by Zorori.

- Yamada (やまだサンタ)

A red nosed Santa.

- Santa Police (サンタポリス, Santa Porisu)

A police force of Santas who arrest those that break into a Santa house.

Soccer Boys (サッカーしょうねんたち)

An elementary school soccer team. They challenge Zorori to a match.

Beckingham (ベッキンカム夫妻)

A famous soccer player.

Chipoli (チポリ, Chipori)

A short cat police officer.

Topol (トポル, Toporu)

A weasel police officer and partner of Chipoli.

Chief Gomez (ゴメス署長, Gomesu Shochō)

Warden of the "Animal Punishment Prison".

Kierunga (キエルンガー, Kierungā)

A robot with laser eyes owned by the "Animal Punishment Prison".

Money (マニイ, Manī)

A very rich girl.

Ji-san (ジイさん, Jī-san)

Money's butler.

Ōnyūdō mecha (大入道メカ)

An inflatable machine designed to scare people.

Michael (ミカエル, Mikaeru)

A rich frog who collects many rare items. He owned one of two rare Bururu cards.

- Piranha Dogs (ピラニア大た, Pirania Daita; Large Piranhas)

Dog-esque creatures with piranha-esque jaws.

- Morimori Guardmen (モリモリガードマン)

Michael's swole frog security guards.

Gorimaru (ゴリまる; Circle Gorilla)

A gorilla ninja master who offers free classes, yet the classes require many costly items.

Sarumaru (サルまる; Circle Monkey)

Gorimaru's monkey assistant.

Cindy Clawhyord (シンディ・クロヒョード, Shindi Kurohyōdo)

A black leopard model. Zorori gives her his phone number, but she throws it away.

Inutaku (イヌタク)

A dog police officer whose goal is to capture Zorori. His full name is Inuda Takuji

Inutaku's father (イヌタクのちち, Inutaku no Chichi)

He is very ill.

Inutaku's mother (イヌタクのはは, Inutaku no Haha)

All of her ancestors were police chiefs for generations.

Royal Forest Family

Their castle was stolen by five monsters.

- King (森の中の城の王様, Mori no Naka no Shiro no Ō-sama; King of the Castle in the Forest)

He requested Zorori to retrieve his castle.

- Queen (森の中の城のお妃様, Mori no Naka no Shiro no Okisaki-sama; Queen of the Castle in the Forest)

Wife of the King.

- Princess Colette (コレット, Koretto)

She was put under a sleeping spell.

Castle Guardians

Monsters who each guard a floor of a castle.

- Luca (まじょルカ, Majoruka)

A witch who is trying to lose weight. Zorori gave her medicine that shrinks her.

- Seki no Yama (せきのやま, Seki no Yama; Mountain Cough)

A thin sumo wrestler. He wears an inflatable suit.

- Jiicha fighter (じいちゃファイター, Jīcha faitā; Grampa fighter)

An elderly chicken-esque karate master. He is energetic, yet fragile.

- Chun (チュン, Chun)

A man in traditional Chinese attire who can launch fireballs.

- Saibusu (サイブス, Saibasu)

A gigantic rhino. His weakspot is a boil on the back of his head.

=== Books 21-30 ===
Dunk (ダンク, Danku)

A reindeer basketball player from the Bosque Kingdom who was chosen to be a ski jump competitor at the World Winter Sports Tournament. He lacked confidence because he never skied before.

King of Bosqué (ボスケの国の王様, Bosuke Kuni no Ōsama)

He chose Dunk to compete in the World Winter Sports Tournament so his country would be famous.

Yoshizo Kumada (熊田吉蔵)

A 62 year old bear security guard.

Game Store Owner (ゲーム店店主, Gēmu Mise Tenchu)

A pig owner of a store of video games.

Princess Myan (ミャン王女, Myan-ōjo)

A princess Zorori frees from a video game.

Game King (ゲームの国の王様, Gēmu no Kuni no Ōsama )

Father of Princess Myan.

Game Country Monsters (ゲームの国のモンスター)

- Odaruman (おだるまん)

- Kaakara (カアカラ)

- Butakujaku (ぶたくじゃく)

- Hitotsu-me Goburin (一つ目ゴブリン)

- Dorodoro Suraimu (どろどろスライム)

- Hogē~tsu (ホゲーッ)

- Uhohha (ウホッハ)

- Kakkuncho (カックンチョ)

- Urusai (ウルサイ)

- Ogegeroge (オゲゲロゲ)

- Ugyarusu (ウギャルス)

The final boss.

Professor Wandock (ワンドックはかせ)

A dog archaeologist.

Professor Budel (ブーデルはかせ, Būderu no Hakase)

A baboon scientist who specializes in vegetables.

Leonardo Bleo (レオナルド・ブリオ, Leonarudo Burio)

A bear who raised a ship called the "Bypanic" with his farts.

Rose (ローズ, Rōzu)

Leonardo's Bleo's wife.

Guramo (グラモ)

A wanted criminal mole who tries to frame Zorori for his crimes. His name is an anagram of "mogura"(mole).

Lion Ryokan Inn

- Conyan (コニャン, Konyan)

A cat boy who works at the Lion Ryokan Inn. He is a parody of Conan from Case Closed.

- Nyaon (ニャオン)

Father of Conyan and owner of the Lion Ryokan Inn.

- Janitor (掃除のおじさん)

The inn's janitor.

- Eripick Buwaro (エリピック・ブワロ)

A pig guest who lied about being a detective.

- Kabakku Domutsu (カーバック・ドームズ)

A hippo guest who lied about being a detective.

- Madam (マダム)

A guest at the inn.

- Hamujiro (ハム次郎)

Madam's pet hamster.

Snow (スノウ, Sunō)

A cat mother who lives in an isolated forested area.

Matthew (マシュー, Mashū)

Son of Snow.

Snow's husband (スノウの夫, Sunō no Otto)

He shows up after the cure is consumed.

The Moo Moo Girls (モーモーむすめ, Mō Mō Musume)

Nine cow sisters. They compete in the town's float festival.

Chun-kun (チュン)

A sparrow music producer.

Mayor Goat (ヤギ町長)

Mayor of Goat Goat Town.

Ramen King (ラーメンおう)

A food critique who rates ramen restaurants.

Owner of Turtle Turtle Ramen (カメカメ亭のおやじ)

A turtle who owns a ramen shop with good noodles, but bad soup.

Tawaji (タワジ)

Son of the Owner of Turtle Turtle Ramen.

Owner of Crane Crane Ramen (ツルツル軒の主人)

A crane who owns a ramen shop with good soup, but bad noodles.

Nokko (ノッコ)

Daughter of the Owner of Crane Crane Ramen.

=== Books 31-40 ===
Akuma (あくま; The Devil)

A devil who was sent out by Enma to kill Zorori, but failed. He was originally a bear.

Enma The Great (エンマだいおう, Enma-daiou)

The ruler of hell. Because Zorori's name was in Enma's book, Enma made sure he went to Hell. He then gives Zorori a chance to be revived if he manages to pass through seven hells.

Onis of Hell

- Green Oni (緑鬼)

Hell's gate keeper.

- Purple Oni (紫鬼)

He falls for Zorori's angel disguise.

- Red Oni (赤鬼)

He explains the rules of Hell.

- Bat Oni (バット鬼)

He carries a bat.

- Yellow Oni (黄色鬼)

He makes sure people cross the Blood Pond Hell

- Blue Oni (青鬼)

He informed Enma that Zorori cleared the sixth hell.

- Small Oni (チビ鬼)

He is small.

- Pink Oni (ピンク鬼)

He is seen in Anything Goes Hell.

- Oyaji Gag Onis (オヤジギャグ地獄の親父達)

They reside in a hell where they tell freezing oyaji gags.

Hell Monster (地獄の怪獣, Jigoku no Kaijū)

A monster who lives in the depths of "Anything Goes Hell".

Panda (パンダてつろう)

The only individual to pass through seven hells and be revived. He's a reference to Tetsurō Tamba.

Nekojima Director (ネコジマディレクター)

A cat director of a TV station.

Bero (ベロ, Bero; Tongue)

One of the commentators of the Monster Major League. He talks a lot.

Otonashi (オトナシ, Quiet)

The other commentator of the Monster Major League. He hardly speaks.

Horrors

The opponents of the Restorers. Each is roughly named after a different American baseball player.

- Habe (ヘーブ, Hēbu)

Named after Babe Ruth. The team's pitcher. His glove is attached to a tube attached to his buttocks. His pitches are powered by his farts.

- Die Gobb (ダイ・ガッブ, Dai Gabbu)

Named after Ty Cobb. A three eyed monster with chicken feet.

- Todriguez (トドリゲス, Todorigesu)

Named after Alex Rodriguez. A whiskered green monster.

- Zozosa (ゾゾーサ, Zozosa)

Named after Sammy Sosa. A three eyed elephant.

- Fu Gerrick (フー・ゲーリック, Fū Gērikku)

Named after Lou Gehrig. A four eyed, bat winged, two tailed, curly haired yellow monster.

- Dandy Johnson (ダンディ・ジョンソン, Dandi Jonson)

Named after Randy Johnson. A three eyed monster with a watermelon like head.

- Punk Iron (パンク・アイロン, Panku Aironno)

Named after Hank Aaron. A pink monster with a long tongue.

- Uni Bose (ウニー・ボウズ, Unī Bōzu)

Named after Pete Rose. A sea urchin esque creature.

- Hedro Marti Nez (ヘドロ・マルチ・ネス, Hedoro Maruchi Nesu)

Named after Pedro Martínez. A reptilian creature with tentacles.

Nelly (ネリー, Nerī)

A wizard that finds Zorori and gives her confidence to train harder to be a wizard. She is a 2nd year student at the magic school. Resulting when she reads a book she calls for help of Zorori and he help her with that. She is Milly's younger sister.

Bemul (ベルム)

A bear town leader.

Wizards of Terror

Minions of the Evil Wizard.

- Goatywhiter (ヤギー・シロー, Yagishiishirou)

A white goat who pretends to make objects disappear, but actually eats them underneath a cloth.

- Goatyblacker (ヤギー・黒, Yagiikurou)

A black goat and partnet of Goatywhiter.

- Myarick (ミャリック)

A cat who hangs on strings. He claims to have telekinesis.

- Princess Nyanko (プリンセス・ニャンコー)

Myarick's rollerskating assistant.

- Debutcho Kabāfīrudo (デブッチョ・カバーフィールド)

A hippo tied to rope who will crush victims.

Najō (ナジョー, Najō)

Creatures that inhabit Magic Country.

Hell Doctor (地獄の診察医)

Enma's doctor.

Art Students

Painters who were deceived by Guramo.

- Shikaso (シカソ)

A male elk.

- Jagaru (ジャガール, Jagāru)

A male jaguar.

- Kiriko (キリ子)

A female giraffe.

Tail (テイル, Teiru)

A cat girl adventurer.

Gale (テイル; ゲイル)

Archaeologist, adventurer, and Tail's father.

Madi (マディ)

A wicked dog and inventor who helps Tiger in a plot against Zorori. He created Shirodaruman, Kierunga, and Piranha Dogs.

Dinosaur Father (恐竜のパパ)

A pink dinosaur. Husband of Dinosaur Mother.

Baby Dinosaur (恐竜の赤ちゃん)

A pink dinosaur baby born from the egg that Zorori protected.

Large octopus (大ダコ)

It tried to eat the dinosaur egg.

Gorimama (ゴリママ)

Wife of Gorimaru. Gorimaru abandoned her.

- Gorimama's children (ゴリママの子供達)

They were hungry for dinosaur egg.

=== Books 41-50 ===
Arius (アリウス, Ariusu)

A rabbit elementary school teacher.

Professor Mallow (マロウ)

A doctor and father of Arius.

Loukto (ルクト)

A bear assistant of Professor Mallow.

Mami (マミ)

Loukto's sister

=== Books 51-60 ===
Zoro Mountain (ゾロの山)

Zorori's wrestling robot.

Bull Sea (ブルの海)

Duke Bull's wrestling robot.

Rose (ローズ)

A cat spy and love interest of Zorori.

Genie of the Lamp (ランプの大まじん)

Milo Monta (ミロ・モン太)

A monkey quiz show host.

=== Books 61-70 ===
Alzer (アルゼル)

Son of Arthur and Elzie.

Martha (マーサ)

Daughter of Arthur and Elzie.

Dragon (ドラゴン)

A green dragon.

== Anime Exclusive ==
=== Season 1 ===
Dalmanian (ダルマニアン, Darumanian)

A rich dog who tries to find the Bukkura Koita, because he wants his daughter to laugh.

Pomela (ポメラ, Pomera)

Dalmanian's quite daughter.

Yogansu (ヨーガンス, Yōgansu)

A rock creature that resides in a mountain.

Tanuki Mother (母さんダヌキ, Kā-san Tanuki)

The mother of the wizard from Book 3.

The Four Crayon Siblings (クレー４きょうだい, Kurē Yon Kyōdai)

Crayon bandits that terrorize the cards. They have 24 other brothers.

The Cards (カードくんたち, Kādo-kuntachi)

Living cards that live in a remote village. They specialize in making paper, the same material that makes their buildings.

Mayor Porks (ポークス市長, Pōkusu-shichō)

A pig mayor who stole a statue and framed Zorori.

Maltinu (マルチーヌ, Maruchīnu)

A maltese princess who befriends Ishishi and Noshishi.

Maltinu's mother (マルチーヌのママ)

She lets Ishishi and Noshishi stay at the castle.

Bagu (バグ)

Maltinu's bulldog supervisor.

Basukī (バスキー)

Maltinu's cat supervisor.

Gus (ガス, Gasu)

A sweet potato farmer. He spent 50 years cultivating sweet potatoes.

Zorori Castle (ゾロリじょう, Zorori-jō)

A castle with artificial intelligence built by Duke Bull. Zorori won it in a lottery. Zorori told it to clean itself, and then it fell into the ocean.

Professor Gaon (ガオン博士, Gaon-hakase)

A lone traveling wolf scientist in search of things he wants to build. He is intelligent, strong and resourceful. He and Zorori are equally matched and are friendly rivals. He has his own Bukkura Koita he made himself, but it is no match for Zorori's original. His name is a reference to the Hebrew word for "genius", gaon.

- Mecha Ishishi (メカイシシ, Meka Ishishia)

A robot replica of Ishishi.

- Mecha Noshishi (メカノシシ, Meka Noshishi)

A robot replica of Noshishi.

- Sorori (ソロリ)

A robot replica of Zorori that malfunctioned.

President Shiroku (シロク大統領)

Polar bear president of Hail.

Vice President Otto (オットー副大統領)

Fur seal vice president of Hail.

Fortune Teller Obaba (占いオババ)

A penguin fortune teller.

Mermaid Princess (人魚姫, Ningyo-hime)

After Zorori Castle fell into the ocean, she claimed it for herself.

Mermaid Queen (人魚女王, Ningyo-jō)

Mother of the Mermaid Queen.

Datsuji (タツじい, Datsujī)

The seahorse servant of the Mermaid Princess.

Hamburger Hippo (カバのハンバーガー屋)

Manager of a fast food restaurant. He encourages his employees to smile.

Burger Robot (バーガーロボ)

A robot built by Zorori that makes fast food meals.

Chinku (チンク, Chinku)

A fisherman apprentice dog.

Chinku's grandfather (チンクのおじいさん, Chinku no Ojī-san)

He and Chinku live together.

Yo-chan (ヨッちゃん)

A giant squid residing by the harbor.

Dober (ドーベル, Dōberu)

A fisherman contractor. He demanded that Yo-chan be killed.

Cynthia (シンシア, Shinshia)

Gaon's mother.

=== Season 2 ===
Ranra (ランラ)

Conyan's sister. She is a parody of Ran Mouri from Case Closed.

Magic School

- Principal (こうちょうせんせい)

- Vice Principal (きょうとうせんせい)

- Lunch Lady (しょくどうのオバちゃん)

- Dapon (ダポン)

- Milly (ミリー, Mirī)

Nelly's older sister. She has a crush on Roger.

- Roger (ロジャー, Rojā)

A character that in some ways resembles Zorori. He never understands Milly's feelings, until she slaps him; they then get together .

People of Gorgeous Town

- Mayor of Gorgeous Town (ゴージャスタウンの町長)

- Jean (ジャン)

- Soreiyu (ソレイユ)

Prankster Kids (いたずらこぞう)

Onji (オンジ)

Warako (ワラコ)

Wallaby (ワラビー)

Deary (ディアリー)

Real-estate agent (不動産業者)

Dragon Messenger (ドラゴン使い)

Dragon (ドラゴン)

Baby Dragon (ドラゴンの赤ちゃん)

Curry Shop Owner (カレーやのおじさん):

Gattōne (ガットーネ)

A cat that delivers pizzas via a moped.

=== Season 3 ===
Puppe (プッペ)

A ghost guide helping find the 'Minus Eel'. He can escape from his body and move around as a spirit. He is sometimes a great help to Zorori.

Plus Eel (プラスデンキウナギ)

A large eel who resides in a deep pond in Ghost Forest. The residents of Ghost Forest call him a guardian deity.

Minus Eel (マイナスデンキウナギ)

A small eel and friend of Plus Eel.

Leroux (ルルー)

An old wolf and self proclaimed "King of Badness". In his younger days, he would intimidate people as he walked by. After getting hit by a baseball one of the pig siblings, he was then ridiculed. Zorori helps him with revenge.

The three pig siblings (ブタの3きょうだい)

Pigs living in a high security house.

Peyo (ペヨ)

An athletic cat boy Zorori meets at an amusement park.

Cheju (チェじゅ)

An elderly cat woman who became young when she entered the amusement park.

B's (カモネーズ)

The comedy trio of Nikoniko Town

- Maybe (ソーカモネ)

A hippo in a white suit. He's the town's mayor.

- Couldbe (アルカモネ)

A pig in a red suit. He snaps his fingers.

- Cantbe (ナイカモネ)

A rhino in a blue suit. He plays a ukulele.

Cinderella (シンデレラ)

Loosely based on the fairy tail character of the same name.

Sebastion (セバスチャン)

A robot dog butler who outperforms Cinderella.

Saisai (サイサイ)

A baby rhino with super strength.

Pepero (ペペロ)

Pierre (ピエール)

Argent (アージェント)

Daisy (ディジー)

Yeti (イエティ)

Hinden's Father (ブルックはくしゃく)

Hinden (ヒンデン)

Katchiina (カッチーナ)

Sato-chan (さとちゃん)

A rabbit restaurant owner. Business has not been well for her.

Yama-chan (やまちゃん)

Sato-chan's tanuki rival. His restaurant has a lot more customers.

Mayor Gamettsu-sama (ガメッツ)

Wann (ワンヌ)

Red Riding Hood (赤ずきん)

Red Riding Hood's Grandma (赤ずきんのおばあちゃん)

Mecha Gaon (メカガオン)

A robot replica of Gaon built by Zorori.

Arnold Balger (アーノルド･バーガ)

Mr. Champo (チャンポ)

Yagi zō-san (ヤギぞうさん)

- Gokkun (ゴックン)

- Tagojou (タゴジョー)

- Buukai (ブーカイ)

Bururu's Angels (ブルルの天使たち)

Kayo-chan (カヨちゃん)

Sankyuu-san (サンキューさん)

Mayor Hin'emon (ヒン エモン)

King (国王)

Gorigo Juuyon (ゴリゴ１４)

Children of the Ghost Stairway

- Akira (あきら)

- Yumi (ユミ)

- Emi (エミ)

- Kiyoshi (きよし)

Jack Pot (ジャック・ポット)

Grandpa Tata (グランパ・タタ)

Mysterious Cameraman (なぞのマント男)

Madam Sequoia (セコイヤふじん)

A rich sloth lady with a fancy castle. She hosts a marathon rally. The winner of the marathon will become here heir.

Butler (執事)

Madam Sequoia's ram butler.

Marathon Runners

- Sea Urchin Baron Murasaki (ムラサキウニだんしゃく)

He and Bufan are rivals.

- Sea Urchin Count Bufan (バフンウニはくしゃく)

He and Murasaki are rivals. He wears a helmet with cactus needles.

- Ina Baumer (イナバウマー)

A roller skating horse named after Ina Bauer.

- Rats (ラッツ)

Eight rats who run in unison with their ankles tied together.

- Kaningam-sam (カニンガムサム)

A crab who cuts the rats' leg bands.

- Poun (パオーン)

An elephant wearing a shirt with the word "Diet" written on it. He has a stick with a string and banana in front of his face.

Red Oni (赤おに)

Tatanka Tribe

- Nava (ナバ)

- Coco (ココ)

- Inoru (イノール)

- Tayoru (タヨール)

Hawk (ホーク)

Ruby (ルビー)

Indeko (インデコ)

Tega (テガ)

Momo (モモ)

Ikashachō (イカしゃちょう)

Kick the Can Players

- Nōda (ノーダ)

- Jordan (ジョーダン)

- Tati (タティ)

- Yaseo (ヤセオ)

- Futoshi (フトシ)

The Bremens

Four teenagers who aspire to become superheroes. They're a reference to Town Musicians of Bremen and Super Sentai.

- Robert (ロバート)

A horse and leader of the group.

- Inoopy (イヌーピー)

A dog.

- Nekonya (ネコーニャ)

A cat.

- Toricci (トリッチ)

A chicken.

Castle Ghosts

- Reina (レイナひめ)

- Ghost Prince (幽霊の王子様)

- Ghost Vassal (幽霊の家臣)

- Ghost Nanny (幽霊の乳母)

- Ghost General (幽霊の将軍)

- Ghost Knight (幽霊の騎士)

Santas

- Tanaka (田中)

- Yamamoto (山本)

Tatejima Saburoku (たてじまサブロク)

Ama moto joruju (あまもとジョルジュ)

Kozenikawajō (こぜにかわジョー)

Meiko (メイコ)

A robot cat maid whose purpose is to serve tons of food.

=== Season 4 ===
Beat(ビート) The rival of Zorori that replaced Gaon. He has the ability to blow wind out of his tail.

== Movies ==
=== Quest for the Mysterious Treasure ===
Nyanga (ニャンガ)

=== G-G-G-Great Adventure ===
Zorondo Robo (ゾロンド・ロボ)

=== Will Protect It! The Dinosaur Egg ===
Dina (ディナ)

A prehistoric archaeologist cat. She is fascinated with dinosaurs. She's the daughter of a wealthy family.

=== The Space Heroes ===
Clara (クララ)

Handsome Octopus (イケメンのタコ)

Muzmi (ムムジィ)
