= Japanese urban legends =

Story in Japanese folklore which is circulated as true

A Japanese urban legend (日本の都市伝説, Nihon no toshi densetsu) is a story in Japanese folklore which is circulated as true. These urban legends are characterized by originating in or being popularized throughout the country of Japan. These urban legends commonly involve paranormal entities or creatures who encounter and attack humans, but the term can also encompass widespread, non-supernatural rumors in popular culture. Urban legends in the former category rarely include the folklore yōkai, instead of being primarily based on contemporary examples of yūrei (Japanese ghosts). Modern Japanese urban legends tend to occur in schools or urban settings, and some can be considered cautionary tales.

== Natural legends ==
=== 1932 Shirokiya Department Store deaths ===
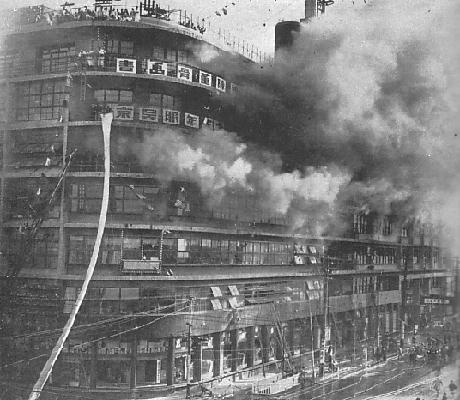
The 1932 Shirokiya Department Store fire

On 16 December 1932, the Shirokiya Department Store fire in Tokyo resulted in 14 deaths. During the fire, many saleswomen in kimono were forced onto the roof of the 8-storey building. Rumors later spread that some of these women refused to jump into the safety nets held by firefighters on the ground. Traditionally, women did not wear underwear with a kimono and were afraid they would be exposed and ashamed if they jumped. As a result, they died. This news attracted attention from as far away as Europe. It has been alleged that in the aftermath of the fire, department store management ordered saleswomen to wear underwear or other underwear with their kimono, and the trend spread.

Contrary to this belief, Shoichi Inoue, a Japanese customs and architecture professor at the International Research Center for Japanese Studies, has denied the story of ambivalent women with fatal modesty. According to Inoue, most people were saved by firefighters, and the story of women who preferred to die with their modesty intact was fabricated for Westerners. The story has been prevalent in many reference books, even published by the Fire Fighting Agency. Moreover, the Japanese generally believed that the Shirokiya Department Store fire was a catalyst for changing fashion customs, specifically the trend toward wearing Western-style underwear. However, there is no evidence to substantiate the belief.

=== Sony timer ===
It was rumored that the Sony Corporation installed a device in all of its electronic products, causing them to fail soon after their warranties expired, an illegal form of planned obsolescence.

This has never been substantiated, and while it is unlikely that Sony would explicitly add expiration devices to their hardware, the "Sony Timer" has also been taken to mean that Sony manufactures devices to withstand just enough use to necessitate a new line. At the annual shareholders meeting in 2007, then president Ryoji Chubachi said that he was aware of the term "Sony Timer".

== Supernatural legends ==
=== Aka Manto ("Red Cloak") ===
Aka Manto (赤マント, Red Cloak) is described as a male spirit who wears a red cloak and a mask which hides his face, and is said to haunt public or school bathrooms, and often specifically the last stall of female bathrooms. According to legend, individuals using a toilet in such bathrooms may be asked by Aka Manto to choose between red paper or blue paper (in some versions, the options will be red or blue cloaks, rather than paper). Choosing the "red" option results in fatal lacerations or flaying, while choosing the "blue" option results in strangulation or exsanguination. Picking a colour which has not been offered leads to the individual being dragged to an underworld or hell, and in some accounts, choosing "yellow" results in the person's head being pushed into the toilet. Ignoring the spirit, rejecting both options offered by the spirit, escaping the bathroom, or a combination of the aforementioned methods are said to result in the individual's survival.

=== Cursed Kleenex commercial ===
In the late 1970s to mid 1980s, Kleenex released three Japanese commercials for their tissues, one of which features a woman played by actress Keiko Matsuzaka dressed in a white dress and a child dressed as a Japanese ogre, sitting on straw. Each advertisement had the song "It's a Fine Day" by Edward Barton and Jane playing in the background.

It was reported that viewers filed complaints with television stations and with Kleenex's corporate headquarters because they found the commercial unnerving, with some claiming that the song sounded like a German curse, despite the lyrics being in English, and others saying that they thought the singer's voice changed when the advert was shown at night.

False rumours about the cast and crew were reported and circulated, including that all those involved in filming the commercial met untimely deaths in accidents, that Matsuzaka was institutionalized after a mental breakdown, or that Matsuzaka became pregnant with a demon child.

=== The Curse of the Colonel ===
The Curse of the Colonel (カーネルサンダースの呪い, Kāneru Sandāsu no Noroi) is supposedly suffered by the Hanshin Tigers baseball team and cited as the cause of their poor performance in the Japan Championship Series. In 1985, fans of the Hanshin Tigers celebrated their team's first and only victory of the series and, in their excitement, threw a statue of Colonel Sanders (the founder and mascot of KFC) into the Dōtonbori River. For several years after the incident, the team failed to win the Championship again, and some fans believed the team would never do so again until the statue was recovered.

The legend is similar in nature to the Curse of the Bambino.

=== Ghost taxi passengers ===
A Japanese urban legend dating back to the Taishō period, that saw a significant resurgence after the 2011 Tōhoku earthquake and tsunami, is a trend of taxi drivers who say that they picked up a passenger, often drenched or cold, who then disappears before reaching their destination, often leaving behind evidence of their presence such as a puddle of water, a glove, or occasionally, the fare for the trip. Because the passenger typically disappears before reaching the destination, the taxi driver is left to pay the fare themselves; however, those with a strong respect for the dead do not mind paying the fare. Ghost passengers are said to often visit homes of loved ones, and many are young people who feel they died too young. Sometimes the passengers seem unaware that they are dead. Yuka Kudo at Tokyo Gakugei University interviewed over 100 taxi drivers in an effort to study the phenomenon, but many refused to answer. Ishinomaki psychiatrist Keizo Hara and others have suggested that the ghost passengers are grief hallucinations or a sign of collective post-traumatic stress disorder. Parallels have been drawn between Japanese ghost passengers and Western vanishing hitchhikers.

=== Gozu ("Cow Head") ===
Gozu (牛頭; "Cow Head"), also known as "Ox Head", is a Japanese urban legend about a fictional story called "Cow Head". Supposedly the "Cow Head" story is so horrifying that people who read or hear it are overcome with fear so great that they tremble violently for days on end until they die. The full story was broken up into fragments that when read individually are not lethal, but still have the power to terrify and inflict great pain and suffering upon those who read or listen to their words.

Gozu was sometimes rumored to be an unpublished piece written by the famous science fiction author Sakyo Komatsu, but there is no evidence to link the author to the legend. A Ukrainian folktale called "Cow's Head" exists, detailing the story of a woman who receives good fortune by offering food and shelter to a disembodied cow's head that visits her one night.

=== Hanako-san (Toire no Hanako-san) ===
Hanako-san, or Toire no Hanako-san (トイレのはなこさん, Hanako of the Toilet), is a legend about the spirit of a young girl named Hanako who haunts school bathrooms. Several variations of the legend exist: in one, Hanako-san is the ghost of a girl who committed suicide during an air raid in World War II; in another, she committed suicide after being bullied by other students. Rumors and legends about Hanako-san have achieved notable popularity in Japanese primary schools, where children may challenge classmates to try to summon Hanako-san.

=== Inokashira Park curse ===
In Inokashira Park, Tokyo, there is a shrine to the goddess Benzaiten, as well as Inokashira Pond, a lake where visitors can rent rowing boats. There is an urban legend which states that if a couple rides on a boat together, their relationship will end prematurely. In some versions of the legend, happy couples who visit the park will be cursed by the jealous Benzaiten, which will cause them to break up.

=== Jinmenken ("Human-Faced Dog") ===
Jinmenken (人面犬; "Human-Faced Dog") are dogs with human faces that are said to appear at night in Japanese urban areas. They are rumored to be able to run along highways at extremely high speeds, which allows them to overtake cars and then look back at drivers with their human faces. Jinmenken can talk, but prefers to be left alone. In some stories, which are often presented as comedic, individuals may encounter a dog rummaging through garbage, only for the dog to look up, revealing itself as a jinmenken with its human face, and say something like "leave me alone!" (or "hottoite kure!"). Explanations for jinmenken include that they are genetic experiments, or that a jinmenken is the ghost of a human who was struck by a car while walking a dog.

The concept of dogs with human faces dates back to at least as early as 1810, when a "human-faced puppy" was reportedly exhibited at a misemono. Rumors about jinmenken may also have circulated among surfers in the 1950s, but the modern concept of the legend is first known to have spread across Japan in 1989. Additionally, jinmenken, or human-faced dogs, have made appearances in various media. A dog with a human face appears in the 1978 American film Invasion of the Body Snatchers, and jinmenken have been featured in the anime and video game franchise Yo-kai Watch.

=== Kisaragi Station ===
Kisaragi Station is a Japanese urban legend that emerged on 2channel in 2004, and revolves around a mysterious railway station somewhere in Shizuoka Prefecture. Shared as an anecdote in the thread "Post About Strange Occurrences Around You: Thread 26", the tale recounted how the anonymous user – who was later identified as "Hasumi" – awoke on a train with all other passengers asleep. As Hasumi tried to figure out what had happened, she posted about the strange occurrence on 2channel, receiving advice from other users on the thread. The trip was meant to be her typical commute to work on the Enshū Railway Line, but the train was travelling in an unknown direction, and its driver and conductor were completely unreachable, making it impossible for Hasumi to determine where she was or where the train was headed.

After an hour, the train stopped at Kisaragi Station, late at night. Hasumi left the train, finding the station to be deserted. She asked users on the 2channel thread she had written about what to do, and everyone urged her to escape, but Hasumi chose to stay at the station. Wandering around the station premises, Hasumi attempted to locate a taxi to no success. She then located a telephone booth, dialled her parents and requested that they collect her, but they were unable to determine her location – Kisaragi Station appeared on no maps. Her parents urged her to call the emergency services and inform them that she was lost, but when she did, the authorities assumed it was a prank call.

Suddenly, the station became the scene of several supernatural occurrences. A bell inside the station began tolling ominously, a loud drumbeat was heard, and even the physical qualities of the landscape began to change. Hasumi climbed down onto the tracks in an effort to flee, but was interrupted by a lone voice that shouted "Hey! Don't walk on the track, that's dangerous!" Expecting a station attendant to have found her, Hasumi turned around to see a man with only one leg, who vanished as soon as she saw him. Terrified, Hasumi ran along the train tracks into a tunnel, but tripped and injured herself.

She soon reached the end of the tunnel and was welcomed by a friendly man who offered a ride to safety – unusual for this hour and also at such a location. With no options left, Hasumi returned to the station with the man, and together they boarded another train. However, the train continued along the line into a remote area of the Japanese Alps, and the man wouldn't acknowledge Hasumi's presence, instead talking to himself before ultimately becoming silent.

Hasumi's final post on the 2channel thread was "My battery's almost run out. Things are getting strange, so I think I'm going to make a run for it. He's been talking to himself about bizarre things for a while now. To prepare for just the right time, I'm going to make this my last post for now." After that, Hasumi disappeared without a trace.

=== Kokkuri ===
Kokkuri (こっくり, 狐狗狸) or Kokkuri-san (こっくりさん) is a Japanese game which became popular during the Meiji era. The game is similar to the use of a Ouija board, though rather than using a store-bought board with letters and a planchette, players write down hiragana characters and place their fingers on a coin, before asking "Kokkuri-san" a question. This is a popular game in Japanese high schools.

Legends about the game include Kokkuri-san only telling players the date of their death, while others say that one can ask Kokkuri-san anything, but one must finish the game either by saying goodbye to Kokkuri-san before leaving the table or by disposing of the kokkuri game utensils within a specific time limit, such as spending the coin and using up the ink in the pen used to write the hiragana.

=== Kuchisake-onna ("Slit-Mouthed Woman") ===
Kuchisake-onna (口裂け女; "Slit-Mouthed Woman") is an urban legend about the malevolent spirit, or onryō, of a woman with a mutilated mouth. She is said to partially cover her face with a mask or object and reportedly carries a sharp tool of some kind, such as a knife or a large pair of scissors. According to popular legend, she will ask potential victims if they think she is attractive. If an individual responds with "no", she will kill them with her weapon. If they say "yes", she will then reveal that the corners of her mouth have been slit from ear to ear. If the individual again responds that she is unattractive, or if they scream in fright, she will kill them with her weapon. If they say "yes", she will cut the corners of their mouth in such a way that mimics her disfigurement. Attempting to flee Kuchisake-onna will also result in death; to survive an encounter with her, it is said that individuals may answer her question with a response that confuses her, describing her appearance as "average", distracting her with money or hard candy (specifically the traditional Japanese variety bekko ame), or saying the word "pomade" three times.

=== Kunekune ("Wriggling body") ===
Kunekune (くねくね; "Wriggling body") is an urban legend which concerns distant apparitions seen on widely extended rice or barley fields on hot summer days. A kunekune refers to an indiscernible white object, similar in appearance to a tall, slender strip of paper or a textile sheet, that shimmers and wiggles as if moved by wind, even on windless days. According to legend, anyone who tries to get a closer look at it is driven insane or dies when touching it. Early reports of kunekune appeared on several websites simultaneously. The kunekune legend may be based on local ghost stories about scarecrows coming to life at night (or when someone stares at them too often). Alleged encounters of kunekune are likely a misinterpretation of either a scarecrow wiggling slightly in the wind or wick drains planted to drain water from the inner ground to robust the soft ground.

=== Living dolls ===
One contemporary legend in Japan is that of "living dolls", described by American folklorist Jan Harold Brunvand as dolls that "acquire independent spirits as children play with them and talk to them." If a so-called living doll is mistreated or discarded by its owner, it is said that it may seek revenge against them. An example of this legend tells of a "three-legged" Licca-chan doll, left deformed and discarded in a public toilet. After being discovered by a woman who threw it aside in disgust, the doll cursed her, causing her to lose her sanity and eventually die in a mental hospital.

=== Red Room Curse ===
The Red Room Curse (赤い部屋, Akai heya) is an early Japanese Internet urban legend about a red pop-up ad which announces a forthcoming death of the person seeing it on their computer. A common version of the story says that, while browsing the Internet the victim will be presented with a pop-up of a black text saying "Do you like — ?" (あなたは〜好きですか?) on a red background. After trying to close it, the pop-up will reappear, this time the text saying "Do you like the red room?" (あなたは赤い部屋が好きですか?). Then, the screen will turn red, displaying a list of names of the Red Room's victims. The target will sense a mysterious presence behind them, after which they will lose consciousness. They will later be found dead in their home, with the walls of the room in which they are discovered "painted red with blood".

=== Square (or the Corner Game) ===
Square (スクエア) is an urban legend game circulated in East Asia. The game requires four players and can allegedly summon a supernatural entity.

=== Teke Teke (or Kashima Reiko) ===
Teke Teke (テケテケ) is the ghost of a young woman or schoolgirl who fell on a railway line, which resulted in her body being cut in half by a train. She is an onryō, or a vengeful spirit, who lurks around urban areas and train stations at night. Since she no longer has her legs, she travels on either her hands or elbows, dragging her upper torso along the ground and making a scratching or "teke teke"-like sound. If she encounters a potential victim, she will chase them and slice them in half at the torso with a scythe or another bladed weapon.

In some versions of the Teke Teke story, the spirit is identified as Kashima Reiko, who is said to have died when her legs were severed from her body by a train. According to legend, her legless ghost haunts bathrooms, asking occupants if they know where her legs are. If a questioned individual replies with an answer that Kashima deems unacceptable, she will tear or cut their legs off. Individuals may escape Kashima by replying that her legs are on the Meishin Expressway, or by answering her question with the phrase "kamen shinin ma", which translates to "mask death demon".

=== Hasshaku-sama (or Ms. Eight Foot Tall) ===
Hasshaku-sama (八尺様; 'Ms. Eight Foot Tall') is a Japanese urban legend that is depicted as a female giant creature that arose in the internet.
