= Kisaragi (disambiguation) =

Kisaragi (如月) is the second month of the Japanese calendar.

Kisaragi may also refer to:

== Fictional characters ==
- Kisaragi Saemon, a character in the novel The Kouga Ninja Scrolls
- Kisaragi Yamaguchi, the protagonist of the manga series GA Geijutsuka Art Design Class
- Chihaya Kisaragi, a character in the video game series The Idolmaster
- Eiji Kisaragi, a character in the video game series Art of Fighting
- Gentaro Kisaragi, the protagonist of the tokusatsu television series Kamen Rider Fourze
- Haruna Kisaragi, a character in the anime television series Corrector Yui
- Hisui Kisaragi, a character in the anime television series Tokyo Majin
- Honey Kisaragi, the protagonist of the manga series Cutie Honey
- Jin Kisaragi, a character in the video game series BlazBlue
- Mao Kisaragi, a character in the anime television series Psycho-Pass
- Nanao Kisaragi, a character in the light novel series Tsurune
- Quon Kisaragi, a character in the anime television series RahXephon
- Saya Kisaragi, the protagonist of the anime television series Blood-C
- Takumi Kisaragi, a character in the anime television series Gad Guard
- Tsubasa Kisaragi, a character in the video game series Aikatsu Stars!
- Yuffie Kisaragi, a character in the video game series Final Fantasy
- Shintaro Kisaragi and Momo Kisaragi, characters in of the Japanese mixed-media project Kagerou Project

== Other uses ==
- Kisaragi (film), a 2007 Japanese film
- Japanese destroyer Kisaragi (1905), a destroyer launched in 1905 and scrapped in 1928
- Japanese destroyer Kisaragi (1925), a destroyer launched in 1925 and sunk in 1941
- Kisaragi Sho, a Japanese horse race
- Kisaragi Station, a Japanese urban legend
