= Charlie Charlie challenge =

Divination game

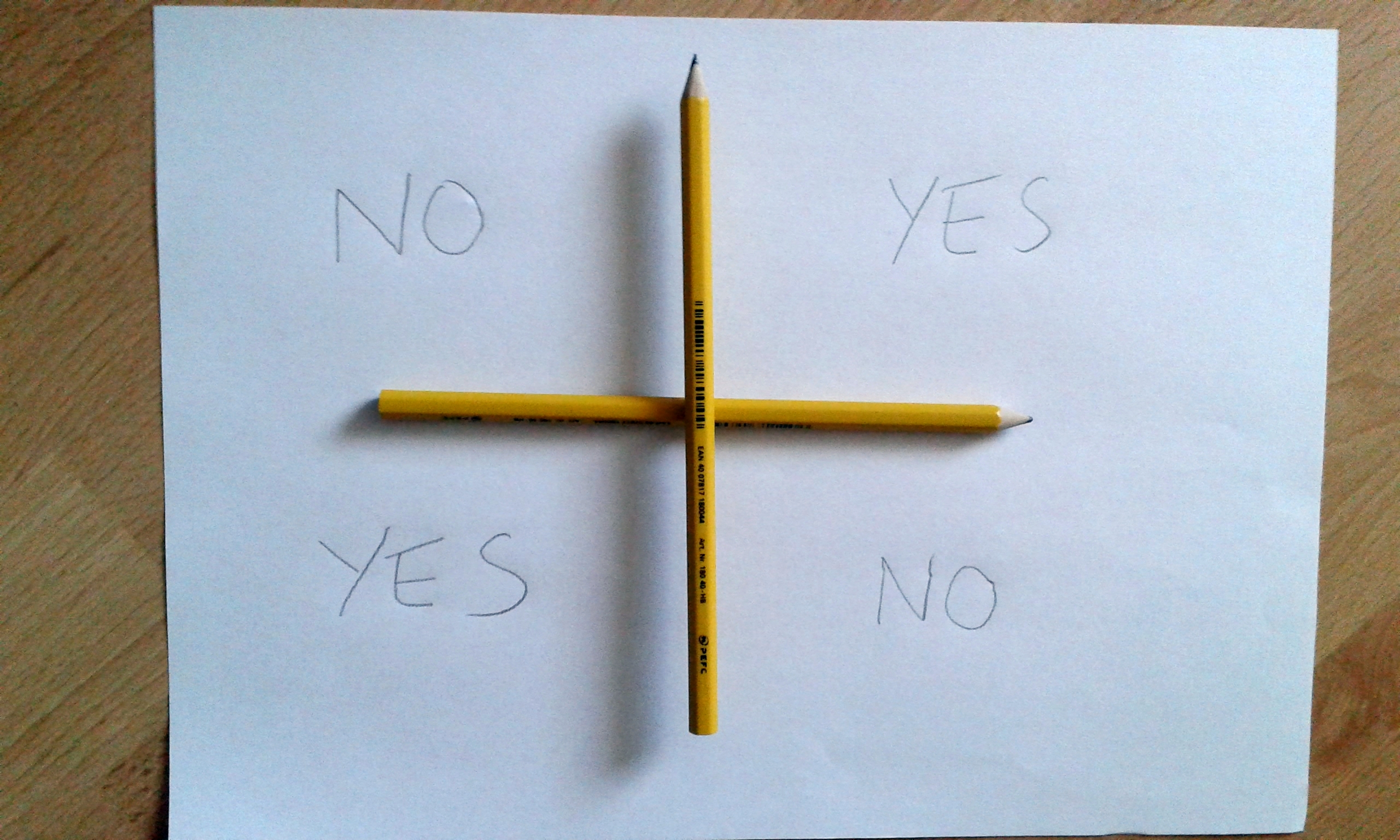
Basic setup for the two-pencil game, with the top pencil balanced on the bottom one, such that minor air movements from slight wind gusts in the room, the breathing of the players, or operating fans can cause it to rotate

The Charlie Charlie challenge is a divination game with the goal of summoning a spirit named Charlie to answer yes/no questions. The putative answer to a yes–no question is found by waiting for a balanced pencil to point towards the word "Yes" or "No" written on a sheet of paper. As with a Magic 8 Ball, most players, typically teenagers, do not sincerely believe in the power of the mechanism. The game is a modern incarnation of an older Spanish game called Juego de la Lapicera ("the Pencil Game"). It was popularized in the English-speaking world in 2015, partly through the hashtag #CharlieCharlieChallenge. On 29 April 2015, an alarmist tabloid television newscast about the game being played in Hato Mayor Province of the Dominican Republic was uploaded to YouTube, and the unintentional humor in the report led to the game trending on Twitter, crossing the language barrier to be played around the world.

== Game ==
=== Four pencils ===
In an early version of the game, two players each hold two pencils in the shape of a square, pressing the ends of their pencils against the other player's. Like a Ouija board, it uses the ideomotor phenomenon, with moving the pencils without conscious control.

=== Two pencils ===
The two pencil game involves crossing two pens or pencils to create a grid (with sectors labelled "yes" and "no") and then asking questions to a "supernatural entity" named "Charlie." The upper pencil is then expected to rotate to indicate the answer to such questions. The first question everyone asks by speaking into the pencils is "can we play?" or "are you here?" or "are you there?"

The top pencil is precariously balanced on a central pivot point, meaning that it can easily rotate on the pivot due to slight wind gusts, or the breathing of players expecting the pencil to move.

== History ==
According to Caitlyn Dewey of The Washington Post, this game is valuable as an example of cross-cultural viral trends:

Charlie makes a killer case study in virality and how things move in and out of languages and cultures online. You'll notice, for instance, a lot of players and reporters talking about the game as if it were new, when it's actually—and more interestingly, I think—an old game that has just recently crossed the language divide.

Maria Elena Navez of BBC Mundo said "There's no demon called 'Charlie' in Mexico," and suggested that Mexican demons with English names (rather than, say, "Carlitos") are "usually American inventions." Urban legend expert David Emery says that some versions of the game have copied the ghost story La Llorona, popular in Mexico, Central America and North of South America, but the pencil game is not a Mexican tradition. Joseph Laycock, a professor of religious studies at Texas State University argued that while "Charlie is most often described as a 'Mexican ghost,' it appears that Christian critics reframed the game as Satanic almost immediately," due to their interests being served by claiming "a monopoly on wholesome encounters with the supernatural."

== Reactions ==
In May 2015, The Racket Report, a parody website that describes itself as "not intended to communicate any true or factual information," posted a satirical article claiming that 500 "mysterious" deaths had resulted from playing the Charlie Charlie Challenge. The Fiji Sun reported claims made by the satire website as news in June. The Fijian Ministry of Education banned the game, and three Fijian teachers in Tavua were taken to a police station for questioning over allegations they forced their students to play it, before being cleared of all charges.

In May 2015, four teenage girls were sent to a hospital in Tunja, Colombia after playing the game, and were quickly released with a diagnosis of mass hysteria.

Kate Knibbs writes that "once the paranormal fad went viral, it didn't take long for Christian fearmongers to warn against calling on the nefarious spirit world." Pat Robertson denounced the Charlie Charlie challenge as demonic. Several exorcists promoted the idea that the game caused spirit possession, a concern repeated by Muslims in Jamaica and the UAE. Various media outlets described participants in the games as "gullible".

In April 2017, the East Libyan government banned the game, blaming it for six suicides.

== Explanation ==
Psychological suggestion can lead people to expect a particular response, which can result in thoughts and behaviors that will help bring the anticipated outcome to fruition – for instance by breathing more heavily. Chris French, head of the anomalistic psychology research unit at the University of London says that human agent detection leads people to see patterns in random events and perceive an intelligence behind them. He argues that divination games involve magical thinking, saying "Often the 'answers' received [in divination games] might be vague and ambiguous, but our inherent ability to find meaning—even when it isn't there—ensures that we will perceive significance in those responses and be convinced that an intelligence of some kind lay behind them." Kate Knibbs, writing in Gizmodo described the game as "a Vine-ready pastiche of kitsch occultism" that "has the familiar pull of pareidolia" where people interpret patterns as having a meaning.

Stuart Vyse, a psychology professor at Connecticut College argues that teenagers often go to see paranormal movies in groups, and "There's a real social bonding aspect to this whole phenomenon," and "It's almost a developmental passage for some kids, to deal with things that are scary." Donald Saucier, a psychology professor at Kansas State University argues that teenagers go through "a period where social influence is very strong" and they are more prone to superstition. Stephen Schlozman, an assistant professor of psychiatry at Harvard Medical School said "I think kids are interested in the dares that aren't actually all that dangerous, but have that feeling of danger to them." Sharon Hill argues that teenagers playing the game "overreact because of the peer situation."

Pastor Carl Gallups told WPTF news radio "I have done some experiments with this, and I think people are being punked. On my desk in front of me, I have the two pencils set up and the one on the top that is balanced is easily moved by just a puff of air." He continued, "I held my phone up to pretend like I was filming it and just started breathing a little heavy, but it's indiscernible to anybody around, and the pencil just moves so easily." Fred Clark and Rebecca Watson liken the phenomenon of pencils moving on a desk to James Hydrick's debunked claim that he could move a pencil on a desk by psychokinesis.

Andrew Griffin wrote in The Independent that the game is "perhaps scarier than a Ouija board because it doesn't have the same explanations. With those boards, players have to keep hold of a glass while it moves around the table—so it's not difficult to imagine that people might be pushing it around without knowing it."

David Emery argues parsimoniously that when simple scientific explanations "can sufficiently explain why a phenomenon occurs, there's no reason to assume supernatural forces are at work." Although such simple scientific explanations have been offered by science journalists, these are less readily available in mainstream news outlets.

== In popular culture ==
The producers of the 2015 horror film The Gallows promoted their film on the bandwagon of the game, releasing a video clip featuring the game.

== See also ==
- Bloody Mary (folklore)
- Corner Game
- Kokkuri-san
- Madam Koi Koi
- Magic 8 Ball
- Paper fortune teller
- Paul the Octopus
- List of Internet phenomena
