= Lady Dimitrescu =

Resident Evil character

- Resident Evil character
- First appearance: Resident Evil Village (2021)
- Created by: Capcom
- Based on: Helena Mankowska (body model)
- Voiced by: English: Maggie Robertson (Village) Erin Nicole Lundquist (State of Survival); Japanese: Kikuko Inoue (Village)
- Motion capture: Maggie Robertson (Village)

Alcina Dimitrescu, (Note: /ˈəlsɪniːɑː ˈdɪmiːtrɛsk/; Japanese: オルチーナ・ドミトレスク, Hepburn: Oruchīna Domitoresuku) better known as Lady Dimitrescu, is a character in the Resident Evil survival horror video game series created by the Japanese company Capcom. One of the villains of Resident Evil Village (2021), she is presented as a gigantic noblewoman with vampire-like traits who resides with her three daughters in Castle Dimitrescu. Dimitrescu governs the village alongside three mutant lords under the supreme leader, Mother Miranda. Her design was based on the Polish model Helena Mankowska, while her voice acting and motion capture were performed by the American actress Maggie Robertson.

Following initial previews of Village, Lady Dimitrescu rose in popularity and has become the subject of fan works including fan art, cosplay, and memes. Journalists and commentators took note of the trend, which began before the release of Village in May 2021, attributing the rapid surge of fan interest in the character to aspects of her appearance. Robertson's performance was positively received and won several awards.

== Concept and creation ==
Created by Capcom for the 2021 video game Resident Evil Village, Lady Dimitrescu was born from the desire to create a charismatic femme fatale character. She was designed as a vampire-like character. Her character design was inspired by the 16th-century Hungarian noblewoman Elizabeth Báthory, the Japanese urban legend and internet ghost story of Hasshaku-sama (or Hachishaku-sama), and Anjelica Huston's portrayal of the character Morticia Addams in The Addams Family. Aspects of Dimitrescu's characterization also reference Ramon Salazar from Resident Evil 4, a diminutive villain said to have resonated with many players as a memorable antagonist. Dimitrescu has been incorrectly pronounced as Dimitreesk in English, with the final "u" letter being silent. This pronunciation has been criticized by Romanian language speakers, who have said that the correct pronunciation is "dimi-tres-ku", as it is a Romanian name.

According to Tomonori Takano, the art director for Resident Evil Village, the development team intended to move away from using simplistic elements like zombies to scare players and instead focus on creating unique situations and memorable characters who would create fear in new ways, continuing a trend that began in Resident Evil 7: Biohazard, the predecessor to Village. The boss character of the Castle Dimitrescu area, Lady Dimitrescu is presented as a nearly invulnerable enemy with long, retractable sharp claws. Dimitrescu is programmed to stalk the player-controlled Ethan Winters throughout her castle; she is meant to be constantly evaded by the player, much like Mr. X from the 2019 remake of Resident Evil 2 or members of the Baker family from Resident Evil 7.

Dimitrescu commands her "daughters", Bela, Cassandra, and Daniela, as her subordinates. They are products of her experiments with the Cadou parasite whose bodies are composed of imitation flies that aggregate into the forms of the corpses they devour and can thrive only within the castle's walls. They were heavily influenced by the Brides of Dracula. Castle Dimitrescu, inspired by Peleș Castle in Romania, was originally conceived as being inhabited by "dozens upon dozens" of Dimitrescu's daughters, but the family was ultimately reduced to Alcina Dimitrescu and her three daughters following trial and error and testing of the game's pacing. Dimitrescu and her daughters, who compete with each other for their mother's attention and approval, feed on human blood to sustain themselves, with the remains of their male victims discarded and left in a crucified state outside of Castle Dimitrescu. Dimitrescu is said to be highly protective of her daughters in a maternal fashion, which the developers approached by presenting her story as paralleling that of Ethan's own family, whom he is also trying to protect.

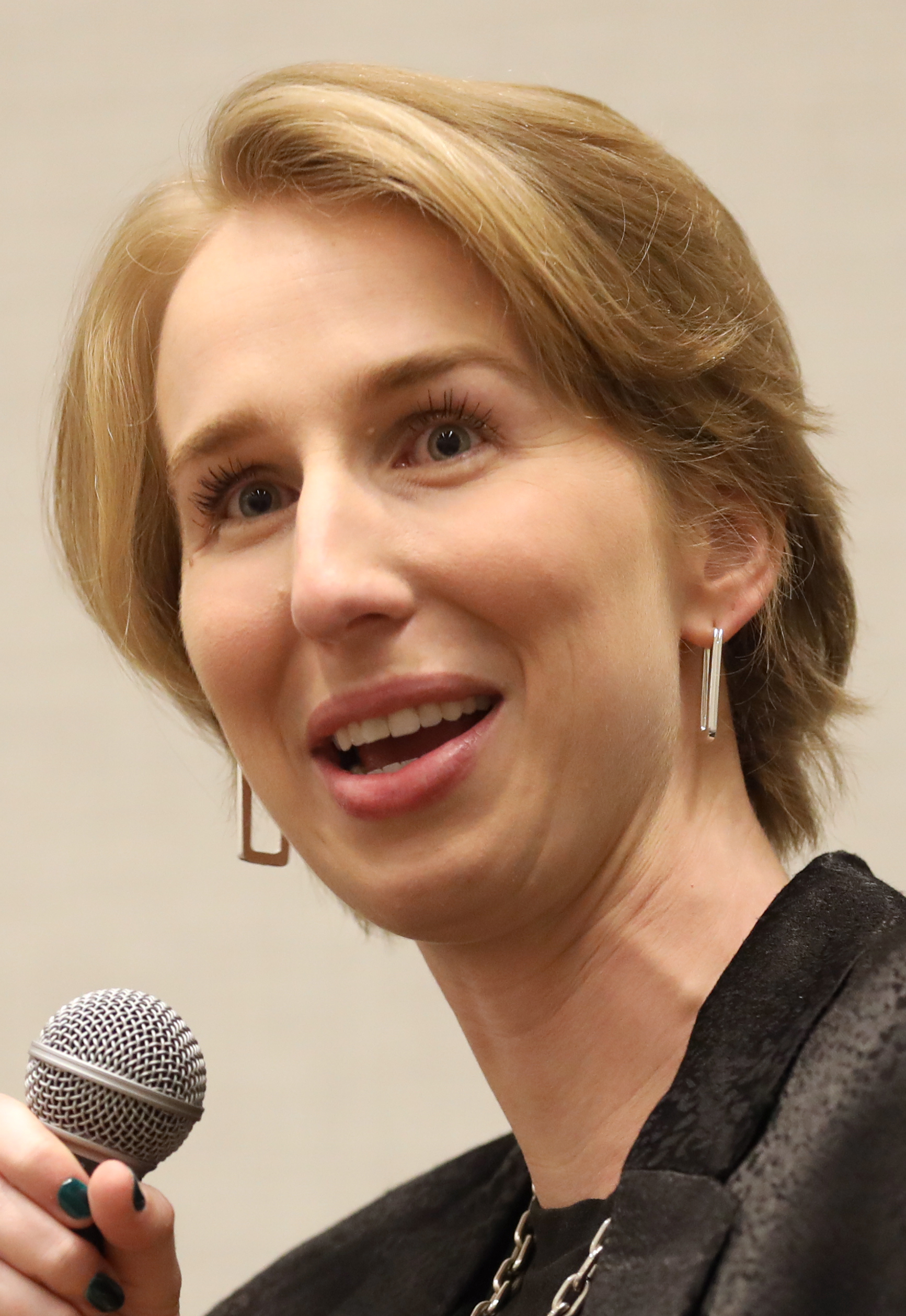
Dimitrescu's voice and motion capture were performed by Maggie Robertson.

Dimitrescu stands at 2.9 m (9 ft 6 in), including her hat and high heels. Takano wanted to avoid typical gothic imagery associated with past Resident Evil games as well as the horror genre as a whole, so the Dimitrescu women's visual design referenced fashion trends from the 1930s era instead, and the sisters' clothing are finely embroidered with floral patterns of the Dimitrescu family crest. Lady Dimitrescu's appearance first developed in an early prototype that used the model of Ethan's wife, Mia Winters, from Resident Evil 7, but with a hat and a dress, which gave the character a ghost-like appearance, but not one that came across as scary. The team scaled-up the model in the game and discovered that the additional accessories provided the necessary element of fear. Based on this prototype, one of the first pieces of concept art Takano drew of Lady Dimitrescu involved her imposing visage leaning down to step through a doorway, demonstrating her height, which he recognized needed to be a scene in the final game and in the game's first trailer.

Dimitrescu's character model was based on Polish model Helena Mankowska, while her voice and motion capture were performed by American theatrical actress Maggie Robertson. Robertson had auditioned for the role on a whim, having recently moved from the Eastern United States to Los Angeles, and was surprised when she was given the role, her first in video games. She considered adopting animal techniques while preparing for the part and considered the character to be "catlike"; she used feline movement as the inspiration for her own motions. When asked, after the character went viral, Robertson said, "I'm incredibly grateful for it. It's given me a platform to create a safe space for lots of different communities, like the LGBT+ community."

== Character story and game appearances ==
Alcina was born into the noble Dimitrescu family sometime before World War I. Although her family traced their origins to Cesare, one of the four founders of an isolated mountain village in Europe, Alcina lived elsewhere. In the aftermath of World War II and the abolition of the nobility, Dimitrescu returned to her family's former lands, which had fallen under the control of a neopagan cult worshipping the Black God. Dimitrescu suffered a hereditary blood disease prior to meeting Miranda, who infected her with the Cadou parasite to see if she was compatible with her plans to revive her daughter. Although the Cadou parasite bestowed her with profound regenerative capabilities, eternal life, and retractable claws, Alcina's preexisting blood disease only worsened, and the mutated noblewoman now required large quantities of human blood and flesh to ingest on a regular basis to maintain her condition, causing her to gradually grow to enormous heights. Upon inhabiting the estate, she took over her family's vineyard and wine-distribution business as a means of supporting herself. As the Dimitrescu family was closely associated with the noble Beneviento, Moreau, and Heisenberg families, Alcina maintained an alliance with them to control the region, serving under Miranda. She came to view herself as Miranda's favorite due to the great gifts she had received, and developed an intense rivalry with fellow lord Karl Heisenberg. This control allowed Dimitrescu's family to rule her castle with barbarous cruelty, regularly taking in new staff to replace those who were taken to the dungeon to be killed; their blood was used to create an enriched red wine called Sanguis Virginis, meaning "maiden's blood". Later, while performing experiments for Miranda, Lady Dimitrescu implanted a form of Cadou within three young women which laid eggs containing carnivorous flies weak to the temperature. Said flies eventually consumed the women and mimicked their forms, creating similarly vampiric beings able to disassemble into a swarm of flies and reassemble at will. Dimitrescu grew attached, and took the women as her daughters, naming them Daniela, Bela, and Cassandra.

In the game, Ethan Winters initially encounters Dimitrescu at a meeting of the four lords, where Miranda leaves Ethan's fate to Karl Heisenberg, much to Dimitrescu's dismay. After escaping Heisenberg, Ethan goes to the castle and is chased by Dimitrescu and her daughters. On one circumstance, he is captured by Dimitrescu's daughters and strung up on a wall to be drained of blood but manages to free himself and kill the daughters one at a time. This infuriates her; she ignores Miranda's orders to personally kill Ethan, and chases after him. After Ethan stabs her with an ancient dagger, Dimitrescu is forced into mutating into her true dragon-like form while confronting Ethan within her estate's family crypt and ultimately dies at his hand.

In the downloadable content expansion "The Mercenaries: Additional Orders" for Resident Evil Village released in October 2022, Lady Dimitrescu is one of the playable characters. To give players smoother gameplay, director Kento Kinoshita decided to reduce her height. Her gameplay consists of using her talons as weapons, gaining speed and attack damage bonuses after each kill. Dimitrescu's hat and dress were included as a bonus outfit for Grace Ashcroft in the next installment of the franchise, Resident Evil Requiem.

== Promotion and reception ==
To promote Resident Evil Village, Capcom distributed life-size standees of Lady Dimitrescu in video game stores. In Hong Kong, promotional material featuring the character was displayed on public transportation in early 2021. Notable merchandise featuring the character included life-size towels offered as prizes to Japanese participants in a competition held on Twitter. Cosplayer Yaya Han uploaded a video sponsored by Capcom on her YouTube channel, documenting the process behind her cosplay activities as the character, in April 2021. On April 30, 2021, a puppet show miniseries featuring Dimitrescu alongside her peers was released on Capcom's official YouTube channel for the series. A three-foot-tall statue of Lady Dimitrescu made by PureArts in collaboration with Capcom was released in the second quarter of 2023. Her likeness has been co-opted by third-party brands such as Domino's Pizza Malaysia to promote their products. In 2023, Capcom released car signs and car stickers depicting her. A US$1,649, 26-inch, deluxe Lady Dimitrescu figure has also been made.

Lady Dimitrescu received very positive reception from critics and players following her initial reveal in a 2020 promotional trailer for Resident Evil Village and her appearance in the 2021 PlayStation 5–exclusive demo Maiden. By February 2021, Takano had publicly acknowledged what he later described as an unexpectedly enthusiastic response to the character. Even though Village was scheduled for launch on May 7, 2021, Dimitrescu's surge in popularity in early 2021 led to a significant proliferation of fan exploration of the character through fan art, including a fan-made action-figure commercial, cosplay activities by notable individuals including Han and Olympic bronze medalist Yekaterina Lisina, and internet memes, which sometimes involved participation by other video game developers on social media. Dimitrescu has been the subject of fan mods for video games; examples include a mod for Fallout 4 that allows her long-sleeved ivory gown to be worn by the player character, and a mod for Village that replaces Dimitrescu's face with that of Thomas the Tank Engine, which Eurogamer described as the "headline act" in the game's "burgeoning mod scene". In March 2021, Epic Games distributed a survey to Fortnite players in order to gauge interest in future crossover promotions; the list of potential characters and brands included Lady Dimitrescu, Jill Valentine, and Ethan Winters. She was also included in Teppen and State of Survival expansion.

Several commentators discussed at length the reasons behind the character's popularity, with many identifying her unusually tall height as a key element drawing fan interest. Leon Hurley of GamesRadar+ observed that Dimitrescu was not the main villain of Village or its most important character, but nevertheless had become more prominent, popular, discussed, and imitated than was originally intended or expected. In light of the character's positive reception, Jess Kinghorn of GamesRadar suggested that the video game industry should be less fixated on youthfulness and feature older female characters with nuanced characterization. In December 2021, Ed Nightingale of Eurogamer described her as the "most memorable character of the year", saying that "Lady Dimitrescu embodies all of this, straddling the line between horror, sex, and camp." Conversely, she has received criticism for "overshadowing" the horror aspect of Village while having briefer screen time than many players may have anticipated.

Commentators have suggested that some of the fan interest is erotic or sexual in nature, specifically feminine dominance. The character's popularity has indeed inspired a substantial amount of fan-made pornography and expressions of desire to participate in sexual or erotic fetishism. The character is said to have generated some interest in trampling, the act of being stepped on by a partner playing a sexually dominant role, in particular. Professional erotica writer Gemma Glitter attributed interest in the character to macrophilia, in this case a fascination with giant-sized women. Steven T. Wright from Input Mag reported that Lady Dimitrescu's sex appeal represents the fetishization of their body height for several real-life tall women, as she is considered to be "simultaneously a beacon of their own power and allure, and a painful reminder of the complex social stigmas society attaches to femme body shape".

=== Awards ===
Maggie Robertson earned multiple awards for her performance as Lady Dimitrescu. She won Best Performer at the 2021 Golden Joystick Awards, Best Performance at The Game Awards 2021, the Great White Way Award for Best Acting in a Game at the 11th Annual New York Game Awards, and the Outstanding Performance in a Drama, Supporting, award at the 21st annual NAVGTR Awards. At the 25th Annual D.I.C.E. Awards, Robertson accepted the award for Outstanding Achievement in Character on behalf of the Village development team in recognition for their collective work with the performance, writing and design of Lady Dimitrescu.
