= Hasshaku-sama =

Japanese urban legend

Hasshaku-sama (八尺様; 'Ms. Eight Foot Tall') is a tall, ghostly woman in Japanese urban legend who curses people with death in isolated countryside places. The legend arose relatively recently online, possibly around 2008. Hasshaku-sama is often associated with modern Japanese horror culture and has been compared to the traditional mountain yōkai Yama-onna.

== Description ==
Hasshaku-sama's origins are unknown, but the earliest known of her appearance comes from an anonymous ghost story that was posted on 26 August 2008, from "洒落にならないほど恐い話を集めてみない？196 (Want to Gather Scary Stories Too Terrifying to Laugh At? 196)," a Japanese textboard channel called 2channel.

Hasshaku-sama is depicted particularly as an 8 foot tall modern yōkai, a gigantic woman with pale skin and a one-piece dress. She is said to always appears as a woman with a hat, and she makes an odd "po po po" sound when she appears.

According to the stories, Hasshaku-sama's is depicted as having varying age and clothing depending on the observer. She also seems to frequent isolated regions in the countryside at night (or in the evening), like fields, villages, or mountain roads.

In the story, Hasshaku-sama can be trapped within a specific geographical zone by Jizō statues, and mainly targets young boys and girls, especially kids who enter in the zone. If victims encounter her, they most likely will be cursed by her and won't survive past the next morning. Hiding in a room with protective talismans and mounds of salt is the only way to evade her hunt.

== Legend ==
The story shared online in 2008 tells of a high-school boy who often visits his grandparents' house in the countryside during summer vacation and winter break. He encounters a very tall woman who wears a one-piece dress and makes "po po po" sounds when she appears. Talking to his grandfather, he is told that the entity is called "Hasshaku-sama", named for her being 8 feet tall, and that she is extremely dangerous and will kill young boys and girls associated with villages or isolated areas.

The boy is later taken to a sealed room with protective talismans and mounds of salt. His grandfather tells him that he must stay overnight in the room and not open the door, since Hasshaku-sama attempts to kill her victims by mimicking voices and knocking on windows to lure them outside.

During the night, the boy hears his grandfather's voice outside. Heeding the earlier advice, he resists opening the door and waits patiently until morning. With the protection of the talismans, he manages to live through Hasshaku-sama's curse and hears from his grandfather that Hasshaku-sama has been sealed away. His grandfather warns him never to return to that place again because Hasshaku-sama might be searching for him.

After the boy's grandfather passes away, the boy hears rumors that the seal of Hasshaku-sama has been broken.

== Cultural interpretation ==
=== Urban legends and rural nostalgia ===
Hasshaku-sama is like many other monsters from other modern urban legends, which are often interpreted as symbols that connect with present-day anxieties and fears. Scholars claim that these modern monsters have a tendency of reflecting the nostalgic image of rural folk traditions and the fears of urban phenomena.

=== Hasshaku-sama and Yama-onna ===
Hasshaku-sama is said to be similar to a Japanese female yōkai, Yama-onna, the mountain woman described in Kunio Yanagita’s Yama no Jinsei (“The Life of the Mountains”).

Yama-onna is described as a female giant with large eyes, mouths split from ear to ear, and long hair that can reach her feet. According to tales, she would give a smile to people that encountered her, and the victim would become ill and die after.

Hasshaku-sama and Yama-onna were compared because of their depiction as giant female creatures that associated with death and the fear of isolated rural areas. Some researchers suggest that Hasshaku-sama is a modern interpretation of earlier female yōkai and older Japanese giant supernatural beings in rural areas.

== See also ==
- Slender Man - a modern urban legend that shares similar features with Hasshaku-sama.
- Lady Dimitrescu - a design character from Resident Evil: Village that was inspired by Elizabeth Báthory, Hashaku-sama, and Morticia Addams.
- Yama-onna - a Japanese female yōkai that shares similar features with Hasshaku-sama.
