= Maggie Robertson =

American voice actress

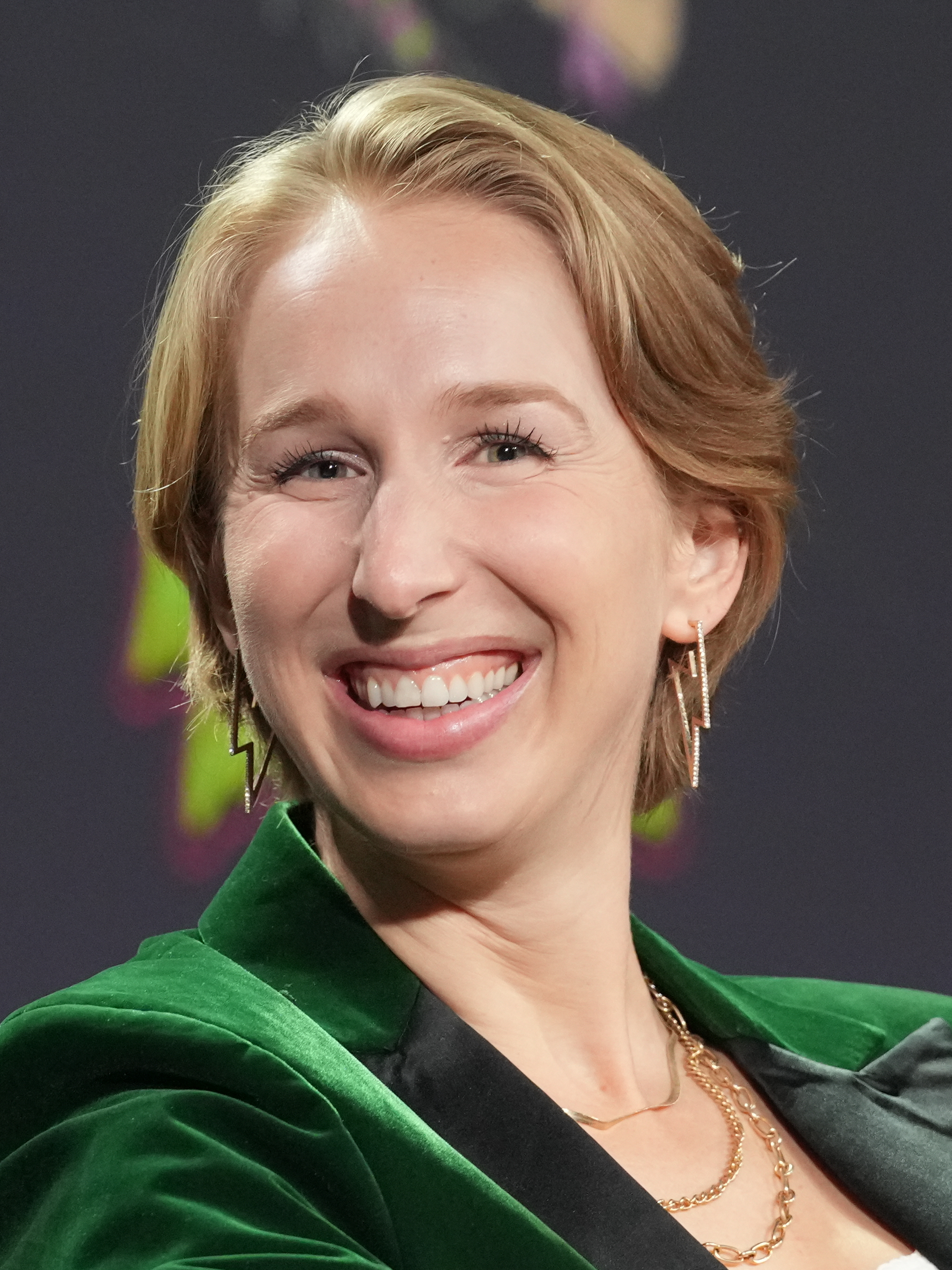
- Robertson in October 2024
- Born: October 30, 1990 (age 36)
- Education: Muhlenberg College (BA); London Academy of Music and Dramatic Art (MFA)
- Occupation: Voice actress
- Years active: 2014–present
- Height: 6 ft 0 in (1.83 m)

Maggie Robertson (born October 30, 1990) is an American voice actress. She is known for her performance as Lady Dimitrescu in the horror video game Resident Evil Village (2021), which earned her a Game Award, a D.I.C.E. Award, and a nomination for a BAFTA Games Award.

== Early life and education ==
Robertson was born on October 30. She first aspired to become a singer, telling PC Gamer that she was intimidated by drama and the idea of "being in the spotlight". Her musical ventures included performing in local choirs and directing her collegiate a cappella group. She received her Bachelor's degree from Muhlenberg College in 2013 and her Master's degree in classical acting from the London Academy of Music and Dramatic Art in 2018.

== Career ==
Robertson began her career in the video game industry, despite being unfamiliar with gaming. Her first credits include Smite and Rogue Company. She then moved to Los Angeles in 2019.

In 2019, Robertson auditioned for the role of Lady Dimitrescu in Resident Evil Village based solely on the description of the character; she had no prior knowledge of the Resident Evil franchise. She likened the process to a theater audition and felt comfortable with her work, but she was surprised at her hiring. To prepare for the role, Robertson studied the movements of animals as she found Dimitrescu to be "catlike". She also took inspiration from the works of Shakespeare.

Resident Evil Village was released in May 2021 to commercial success and favorable reviews. Following its release, Robertson was revealed as the voice and motion capture actor for Dimitrescu. The character achieved viral fame and earned Robertson wide recognition which she found unexpected. Multiple publications, including Eurogamer, The Guardian, GamesRadar, and Polygon, observed Dimitrescu as a breakout character in the video game industry despite not being a main character. For her performance, Robertson won accolades at the Golden Joystick Awards 2021, The Game Awards 2021, the Voice Arts Awards 2021, the 2022 New York Game Awards, the 2022 NAVGTR Awards, and the 25th Annual D.I.C.E. Awards. She was also nominated for the British Academy Games Award for Performer in a Supporting Role at the 2022 British Academy Games Awards, her first major award nomination.

From 2021 to 2022, Robertson reprised her role as Dimitrescu in DLCs and took on roles in Back 4 Blood and God of War Ragnarök. In 2023, she landed her second major role in the role-playing video game Baldur's Gate 3 as Orin the Red, one of the game's three villains. She was excited to play the role because of her past experience with Wizards of the Coast, and called it "liberating". That same year, she appeared in The Lamplighters League, a turn-based tactics video game.

In 2024, Robertson voiced Lilith in Granblue Fantasy: Relink, the fourth video game in the Granblue Fantasy series. In 2025, she voiced Orin the Emissary in the Destiny 2 DLC The Edge of Fate. Ravi Sinha of GamingBolt praised her performance, calling her "great" and noting her versatility.

== Filmography ==
=== Video games ===
Year	Title	Role	Notes
2014	Smite	House Phoenix Amaterasu	
2020	Rogue Company	Runway	
2021	Maiden	Lady Dimitrescu	Game demo
2021	Resident Evil Village	Lady Dimitrescu, Doll C, female villager	
2021	Back 4 Blood	Mother Of Worms	
2022	Resident Evil Village: Shadows of Rose	Lady Dimitrescu	DLC
2022	God of War Ragnarök	Various	
2023	Baldur's Gate 3	Orin the Red	
2023	The Lamplighters League	Lady Nicastro	
2024	Granblue Fantasy: Relink	Lilith	
2025	Destiny 2: The Edge of Fate	Orin the Emissary	DLC
2026	Fortnite	DJ PJ	
2026	Phantom Blade Zero	Inanis, Jade Dancer	
TBA	Warlock †	Tasha	

== Awards and nominations ==
Year	Association	Category	Work	Result
2021	Golden Joystick Awards	Performance of the Year	Resident Evil Village	Won
2021	The Game Awards	Best Performance	Resident Evil Village	Won
2021	Voice Arts Awards	Outstanding Video Game Character – Best Voiceover	Resident Evil Village	Won
2022	New York Game Awards	Great White Way Award for Best Acting in a Game	Resident Evil Village	Won
2022	NAVGTR Awards	Outstanding Performance in a Drama	Resident Evil Village	Won
2022	D.I.C.E. Awards	Outstanding Achievement in Character	Resident Evil Village	Won
2022	British Academy Games Awards	Performer in a Supporting Role	Resident Evil Village	Nominated
