= Aka Manto =

Japanese urban legend

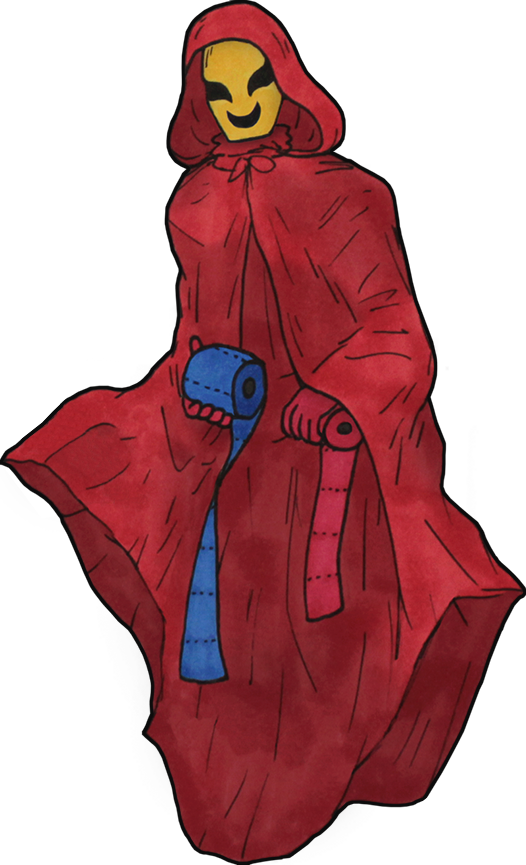
A modern-day depiction of Aka Manto

Aka Manto (赤マント; "Red Cloak"), also known as Red Cape, Red Vest, Akai-Kami-Aoi-Kami (赤い紙青い紙; "Red Paper, Blue Paper"), or occasionally Aoi Manto (青マント; "Blue Cloak"), is a Japanese urban legend about a masked spirit who wears a red cloak, and who appears to people using toilets in public or school bathrooms. Accounts of the legend vary, but one consistent element of the story is that the spirit will ask the occupant of a toilet, a question. In some versions, he will ask if they want red or blue toilet paper, though other versions identify the choices as a red or a blue cloak, or as a red or a blue cape. Choosing either option will result in the individual being killed, so the individual must ignore the spirit, or reject both options and flee, in order to survive.

== Legend ==
Author and folklorist Matthew Meyer has stated that the Aka Manto has been recorded as a schoolyard rumor dating back as early as the 1930s. In that time, the word manto commonly referred to a sleeveless kimono-style jacket, whereas in the modern-day, manto is the Japanese word for cloak or cape. Because of this, different generations have had differing views of Aka Manto's supposed physical appearance.

Aka Manto is described as a male spirit, ghost, or yōkai who haunts bathrooms late at night. Aka Manto is often said to haunt female bathrooms specifically, and in some versions of the legend, he is said to haunt the furthest wall in an individual's bathroom. The spirit is said to wear a flowing red cloak and a mask that hides his face, and is sometimes described as being handsome and charming beneath his mask. The true identity of the Aka manto has ranged from that of a serial killer to a ghost who appears as a tall man with a sickly, bluish-white face.

According to legend, if a person is sitting on a toilet in a public or school bathroom, Aka Manto may appear, and will ask them if they want red or blue toilet paper. Depending on the version of the story, the spirit may ask them to choose between a red cloak and a blue cloak, or between a red cape and a blue cape. If they choose the "red" option, they will be lacerated in such a manner that their dead body will be drenched in their own blood. The specific manner in which the person is lacerated differs depending on the account of the legend, including the person being stabbed or flayed. If the individual chooses the "blue" option, the consequences range from that person being strangled to all of the person's blood being drained from their body. In some versions of the story, the choices are between red and white paper, with the former resulting in a red tongue rising up out of the toilet to lick the student from below, and the latter resulting in a white hand fondling them from below.

If an individual attempts to outsmart Aka Manto by asking for a different color of toilet paper, cloak, or cape, they will be dragged to an underworld or hell as a result. In some versions, choosing a "yellow" paper, cloak or cape will result in the occupant's head being forced into the toilet, sometimes until they drown. Those who bring toilet paper with them into the stall find that it vanishes before they can use it, allowing Aka Manto to present them with its options. Ignoring the spirit, or replying that one does not want or prefer either kind of paper, makes the spirit leave. In some accounts, rejecting both options and running away from Aka Manto will also result in the individual's survival.

In some versions, the Aka manto is a hairy yōkai called a kainade who lives in the toilet. In the kainade’s case, a hairy arm of the chosen color will rise out of the toilet and fondle the student’s behind.

== See also ==
- Akaname
- Hanako-san
- Kuchisake-onna
- Teke Teke
