= Yekaterina Lisina =

Russian basketball player and model

Ekaterina Lisina
Personal information
- Born: 15 October 1987 (age 39) Penza, Penza Oblast, Russian SFSR, Soviet Union
- Listed height: 6 ft 9 in (2.06 m)
- Listed weight: 198 lb (90 kg)

Career information
- Playing career: 2006–2014
- Position: Center

Career history
- 2006–2009: WBC CSKA Moscow
- 2009: Good Angels Košice
- 2010: WBC Spartak Moscow Region
- 2011–2014: Dynamo Kursk
Medals
Representing Russia
Women's basketball
Olympic Games
Bronze medal – third place	2008 Beijing	Team competition
World Championships
Silver medal – second place	2006 Brazil
European Championships
Gold medal – first place	2007 Italy
Silver medal – second place	2009 Latvia

Yekaterina Viktorovna Lisina (Russian: Екатерина Викторовна Лисина; born 15 October 1987), also known as Ekaterina Lisina, is a Russian model and former basketball player. She currently holds a Guinness World Record as the tallest professional model. Throughout her basketball career, she competed for the Russian National Team at the 2008 Summer Olympics, winning the bronze medal.

== World record holder ==
Lisina held two world records: the record for the woman with the longest legs, with her left leg at 132.8 cm (52.28 in; 4 ft 4.28 in) and her right leg at 132.2 cm (52.04 in; 4 ft 4.04 in), and for the tallest professional model at 205.16 cm (80.77 in; 6 ft 8.77 in), and has also been officially recognized as having the largest feet for a woman in Russia (EU 47/US 16), all of which was awarded by Guinness World Records and published in their 2018 issue.

In October 2020, the world record for woman with the longest legs went to 6 ft 10 in (208.28 cm) tall Texas teenager Maci Currin, with her left leg at 135.267 cm (53.255 in; 4 ft 5.255 in) and her right leg at 134.3 cm (52.874 in; 4 ft 4.874 in). She had previously held the teenage version of the same record before aging out of it.

== Popular culture ==
In addition to modeling, Lisina is a cosplayer who portrayed the Resident Evil Village antagonist Lady Dimitrescu. As of November 2022, she had more than 10 million social media followers, garnering over 117 million likes.

== Personal life ==
In 2011, Lisina gave birth to a son.

== Filmography ==
=== Music videos ===
Year	Song	Artist
2019	"Ode"	Louis Prince
2022	"Cowboys Don't Cry"	Oliver Tree
