= Akaname =

Japanese supernatural entity

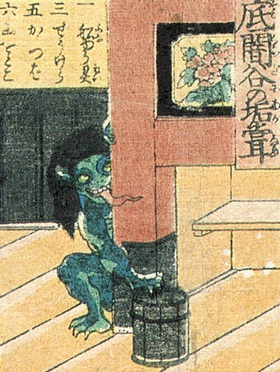
Sokokuradani no Akaname ("Akaname of the Deep Dark Valley"), a frame of something beating it to a picture print used as dice board. Hyakushu kaibutsu yōkai sugoroku (1858) by Utagawa Yoshikazu.

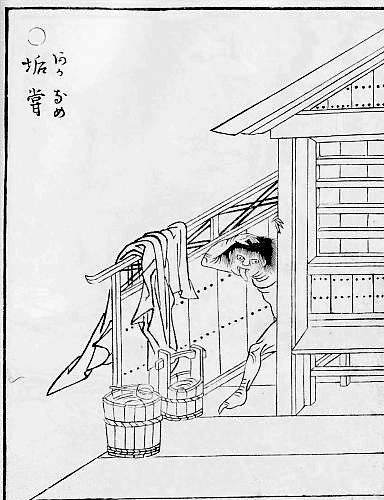
"Akaname", Gazu Hyakki Yagyō by Toriyama Sekien

The akaname (垢(あか)嘗(なめ), 'scum-licker'; 'filth-licker') is a Japanese yōkai depicted in Toriyama Sekien's 1776 book Gazu Hyakki Yagyō, with its precursor or equivalent akaneburi (/垢ねぶり/垢舐(ねぶり)) documented earlier in 1686.

These beings presumably lick the filth and scum that collect in bathtubs and bathrooms.

== Terminology ==
The word aka refers to dead skin on a person's body, alongside the dirt, grime, or sweat that may be scrubbed or washed off; the aka can also refer to scum that accumulates at the bathhouse as a result, including perhaps mildew. (Note: Cf. Miyamoto lists the components of the akaname's diet as consisting of the oily sebum and the keratinous stratum corneum off of humans, and fungi (molds and mildews). She also lists mizuaka (水垢), which can denote soap scum as well as limescale.)

Hence the name akaname means 'scum-licker' or 'filth-licker".

There is speculation whether aka alludes to impurities or defilements of the soul, or negative thoughts known in Buddhism as bonnō (Sankskrit: kleshas), and the yōkai may serve as warning not to be so preoccupied with such thoughts as to be derelict in the chores of cleansing the bath of such filth. Another speculation is a possible connection to the sacred water used as offering in Buddhism, known as aka (閼伽) water, or in Sanskrit, arghya.

== Edo period ==
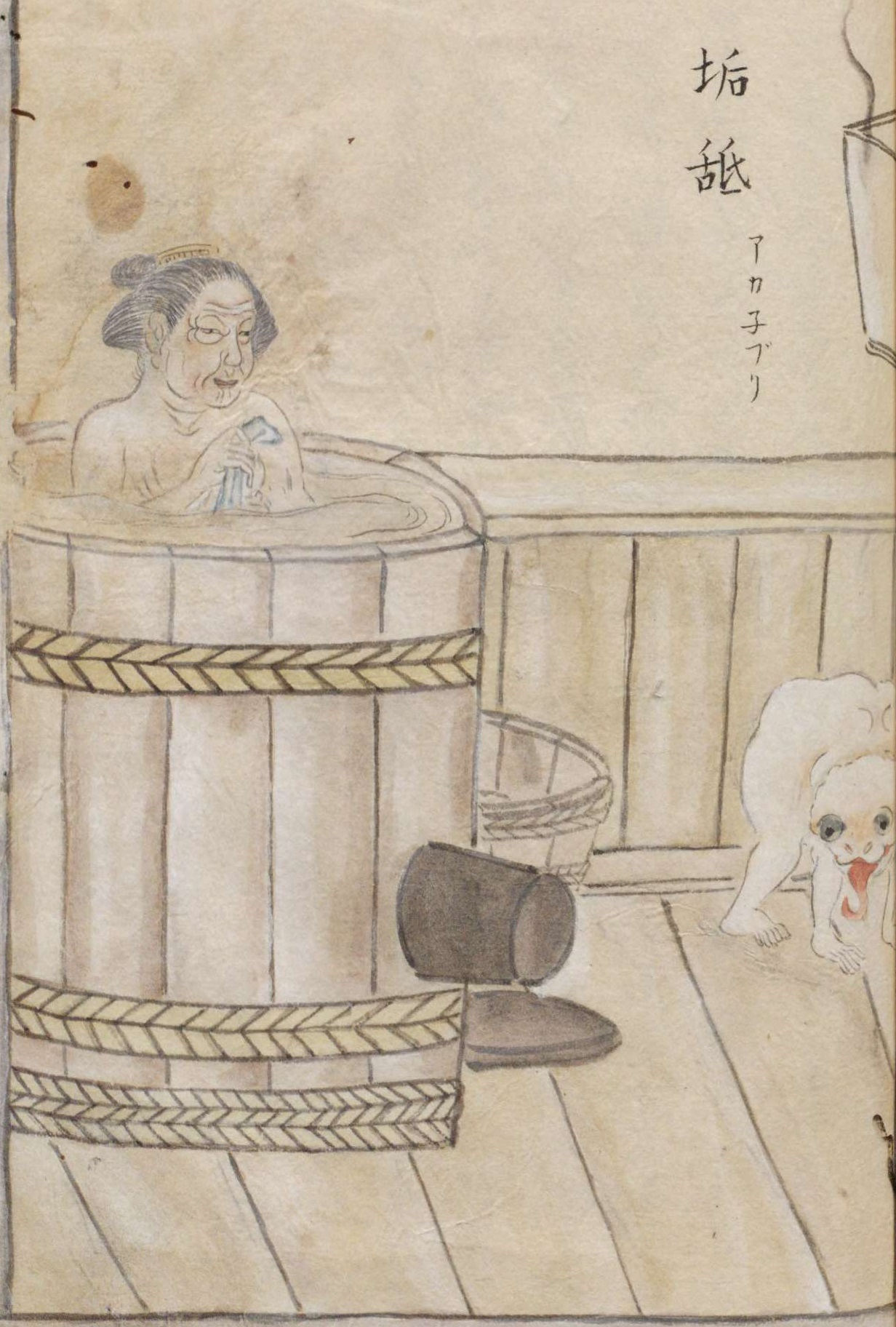
Akaneburi ('Scum-licker') and bathing woman. —Nittō honzō zusan (1780). Painted by Ueda Hiromitsu.

The name akaname ("filth-licker", "scum-licker") first appeared in Gazu Hyakki Yagyō (1776), one of several illustrated yōkai collections by Toriyama Sekien according to some commentators, however, the variant name akaneburi (垢ねぶり) with the same meaning was described earlier in the kaidan book Kokon hyakumonogatari hyōban (古今百物語評判) (1686) by Yamaoka Genrin. (Note: Yamaoka Genrin; Yamaoka Genjo edd., (1686) Kokon hyakumonogatari hyōban 古今百物語評判, Book 2, Part 6 "Akaneburi no koto 垢ねぶりの事".) The form akaneburi (垢舐) is also attested in a work called Nittō honzō zusan (日東本草図纂) compiled by Genki (presumably Kanda Genki).

Sekien did not provide any verbal details regarding his akaname, as was the case in all the yōkai depicted in this particular early work of his. However, the Nittō honzō zusan provided ample details, describing it as child-like, with a pebbly? (磊直) head, round eyes, long tongue, and several example anecdotes are also provided. (Note: One anecdote dated to the Genroku era concerns a servant[?] woman who went to the bath chamber in the morning to tidy up the equipment and her hand touched something that was squirming. She screamed for help and for illumination, but the other women were too afraid to approach. The woman bravely tackled it but was repelled backwards. The other women finally drummed up courage and lit their torches, rolling the wooden board over it and trample on it, and it was squashed like a chicken egg's yolk.) In classical Edo Period depictions the akaname resembles a human child with clawed feet and cropped heads, sticking out its long tongue at a bathing area. In Sekien's (monochrome) drawing the akaname stands around the corner of a "bathhouse", though the setting appears to be a bath housed in an outhouse separated from the main house (living quarters), rather than a public bathhouse. In the Hyakushu kaibutsu yōkai sugoroku (1858), it is depicted as an eerie, blue-black skinned figure.

The Kokon hyakumonogatari hyōban gives lecture on how the akaneburi originates, supposedly it spawns in an area where dust and grime/filth/scum (aka) at an old bathhouse or at a derelict tattered home. That is to say, the akaname was said to emanate (keshō 化生) from the ki (気; qi) energy or inki (陰気) negative energy of the accumulated detritus, and the akaneburi also subsists on eating the filth of its environs. (Note: The Kokon hyakumonogatari hyōban makes further comparison with the examples of the "fish born of water which partakes of water, and lice born of filth that feeds on filth".)

A more sinister type of akaneburi which assumes the guise of a beautiful woman is also described in the entry in Nittō honzō zusan, and it is claimed she will lick away the blood and flesh until only the skeletal carcass remains. The work gives as example the anecdote concerning a man who was in the hot springs at Banshū (Harima Province), and when he allowed a woman to scrub his back, he was licked down to his bones and died. (Note: A cognate tale to this is found in Shokoku hyakumonogatari, featuring a man named Denzaemon from Amagasaki in Settsu Province who went to Arima hot springs and met the same fate from a female bakemono monster. Arima belonged to Settsu Province, which is discrepant from the episode at the hot spring in Harima Province, but Arima and Amagasaki are in current day Hyōgo Prefecture which overlaps with most of Harima and parts of Settsu Provinces.)

== Shōwa, Heisei, and beyond ==
In literature about yōkai from the periods of Shōwa, Heisei, and beyond, akaname and akaneburi were interpreted the same way as above. These interpretations state that the akaname is a yōkai that lives in old bathhouses and dilapidated buildings that would sneak into places at night when people are asleep using its long tongue to lick the filth and grime sticking to bath places and bathtubs. It does not do anything other than lick filth, but since yōkai were considered unsettling to encounter, it is said that people worked hard to ensure that the bath places and bathtubs are washed clean so that the akaname wouldn't come.

There were none who saw what the akaname truly were, but since aka can remind people of the color red (aka in Japanese), they are said to have red faces or be entirely red. And due to the double entendre pun on aka which can refer to both the filth which is the yōkai's essence and to the color red, a (modern) artist tends to conventionally illustrate the akaname as being of red color.

== In other media ==
"Filthlicker (Akaname)" is a song by the UK heavy metal band Sa-da-ko from their 2013 album, Awakenings.

In the video game The Legend of Zelda: Majora's Mask, there is a creature who lives in the hotel toilet in Clock Town that may or may not be inspired by this folk legend.

It has also spawned a fandom as a creature in the Monster Girl Encyclopedia, written by Japanese author Kenkou Cross. In the Lost Girl episode "Big in Japan" (season 5, episode 3) a character almost becomes an akaname.

The Pokémon Lickitung and Lickilicky are based on the akaname, along with the Japanese giant salamander.

In an episode of Yo-Kai Watch the protagonist, Nate, ends up possessed by an Akaname named Tublappa in the localization, and has an uncontrollable urge to lick food clean and eventually people's hair. It's only after his friend Katie shares her salty-sweet candy with him that the Akaname leaves him alone and goes down to the store to buy more candy.

Akaname appear in the Glu Mobile videogame Samurai vs Zombies Defense, in which they fight for the zombies and use their tongues to attack.

In 2020, Lush released a bubble bar named for and modeled after the creatures.

== See also ==
- Aka Manto ("Red Cape"), a Japanese urban legend about a spirit which appears in bathrooms
- Bannik, a spirit which appears in bathhouses in Slavic mythology
- Hanako-san, a Japanese urban legend about the spirit of a young girl who haunts school bathrooms
- Madam Koi Koi, an African urban legend about the ghost of a woman who haunts a school
- Teke Teke, a Japanese urban legend about the spirit of a girl with no lower body
