= Kisaragi Station =

Japanese urban legend

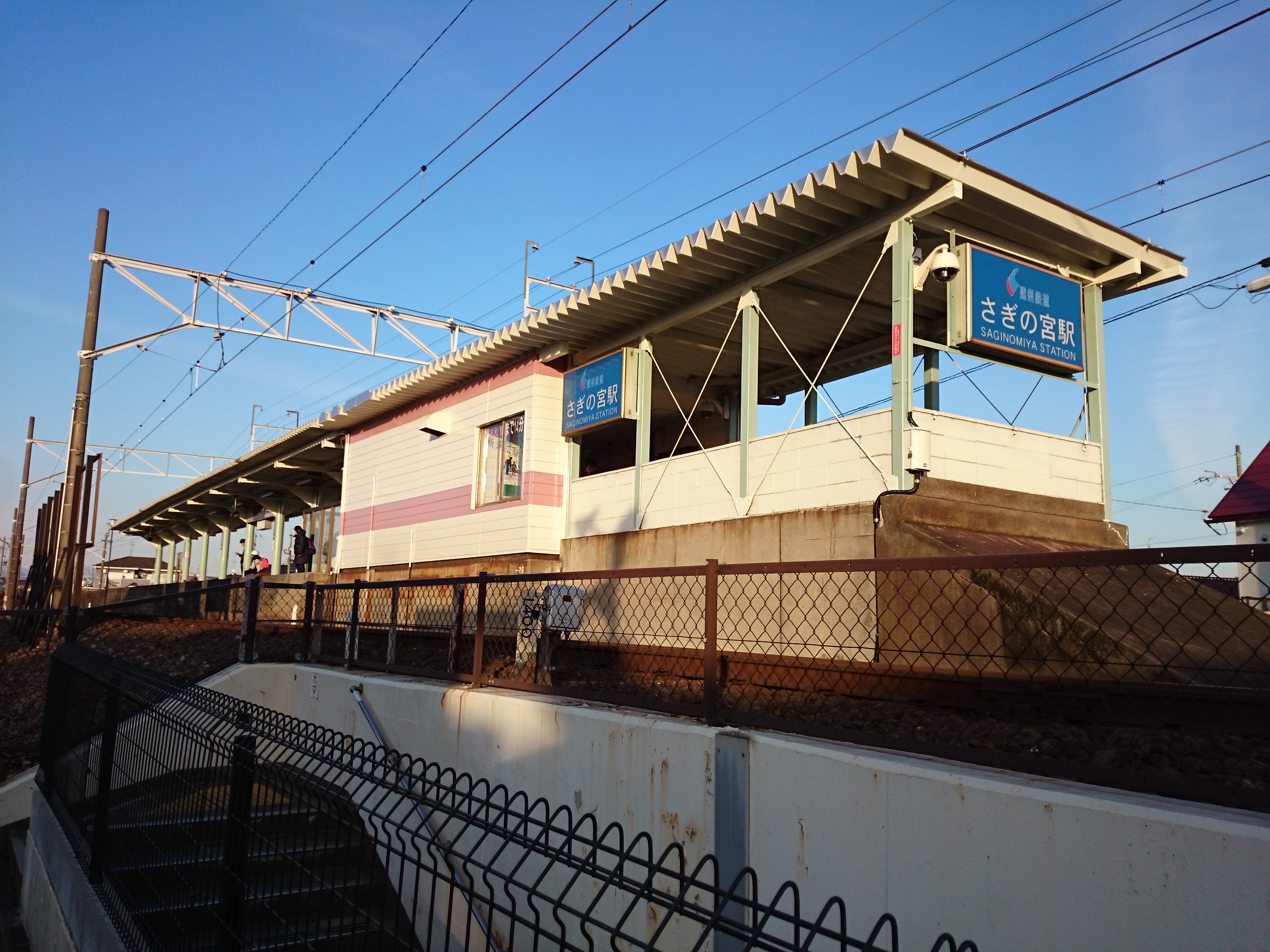
Saginomiya Station, the train station which some have argued may be the inspiration for Kisaragi Station.

Kisaragi Station (Japanese: きさらぎ駅, Hepburn: Kisaragi-eki) is a Japanese urban legend about a fictitious railway station that is host to numerous paranormal incidents.

The story about the train station was first posted on the internet forum 2channel in 2004. Since then, netizens have discussed the station's existence and shared possible sightings, with some rumoring that the urban legend was based on Saginomiya Station.

== Legend ==
A woman, who later revealed her name was Hasumi, made a post inside a train car where other passengers were asleep. Although it was her routine commute to work, the train unusually wasn't stopping for a long time. Unable to communicate with the conductor or driver about the strange occurrence, Hasumi made a post on an internet forum asking for what to do. After replying to posts from users who had responded to her, she updated the thread to say that the train made a stop, one hour after departing from Shin-Hamamatsu Station.

The train had stopped at a station with a sign reading "Kisaragi Station", which appeared to be unmanned, as no staff could be seen. Hasumi exited the train and stayed in the station, continuing to post to ask what she should do next; users warned her that, according to the internet, Kisaragi Station didn't exist, and that she should leave immediately. Wandering around outside, she attempted to hail a taxi but found no success. Eventually, she located a telephone booth and called her parents to pick her up, but they weren't able to find where she was, as Kisaragi Station didn't exist on any map.

Hasumi noted that the area around Kisaragi Station was very unnerving, as a ringing bell and a distant drumbeat became audible. Hasumi decided to try to escape on foot, and began to follow the train tracks away from the station, but was interrupted by a voice exclaiming "Hey! Don't walk on the track! It's dangerous!" When Hasumi turned around, she found that the voice was that of a man with only one leg, who immediately vanished without a trace. Afraid, Hasumi then ran into a tunnel, injuring herself along the way.

After reaching the end of the tunnel, a man welcomed her and offered to help her. The two then returned to Kisaragi Station and boarded another train, which departed the station and continued down the line towards a remote area of the Japanese Alps. While the man was chatty at first, he started muttering gibberish and eventually became silent. It was then that Hasumi made her final post, stating:

My battery's almost run out. Things are getting strange, so I think I'm going to make a run for it. He's been talking to himself about bizarre things for a while now. To prepare for just the right time, I'm going to make this my last post for now.

After this post, Hasumi completely disappeared.

== Internet response ==
=== Location and sightings ===
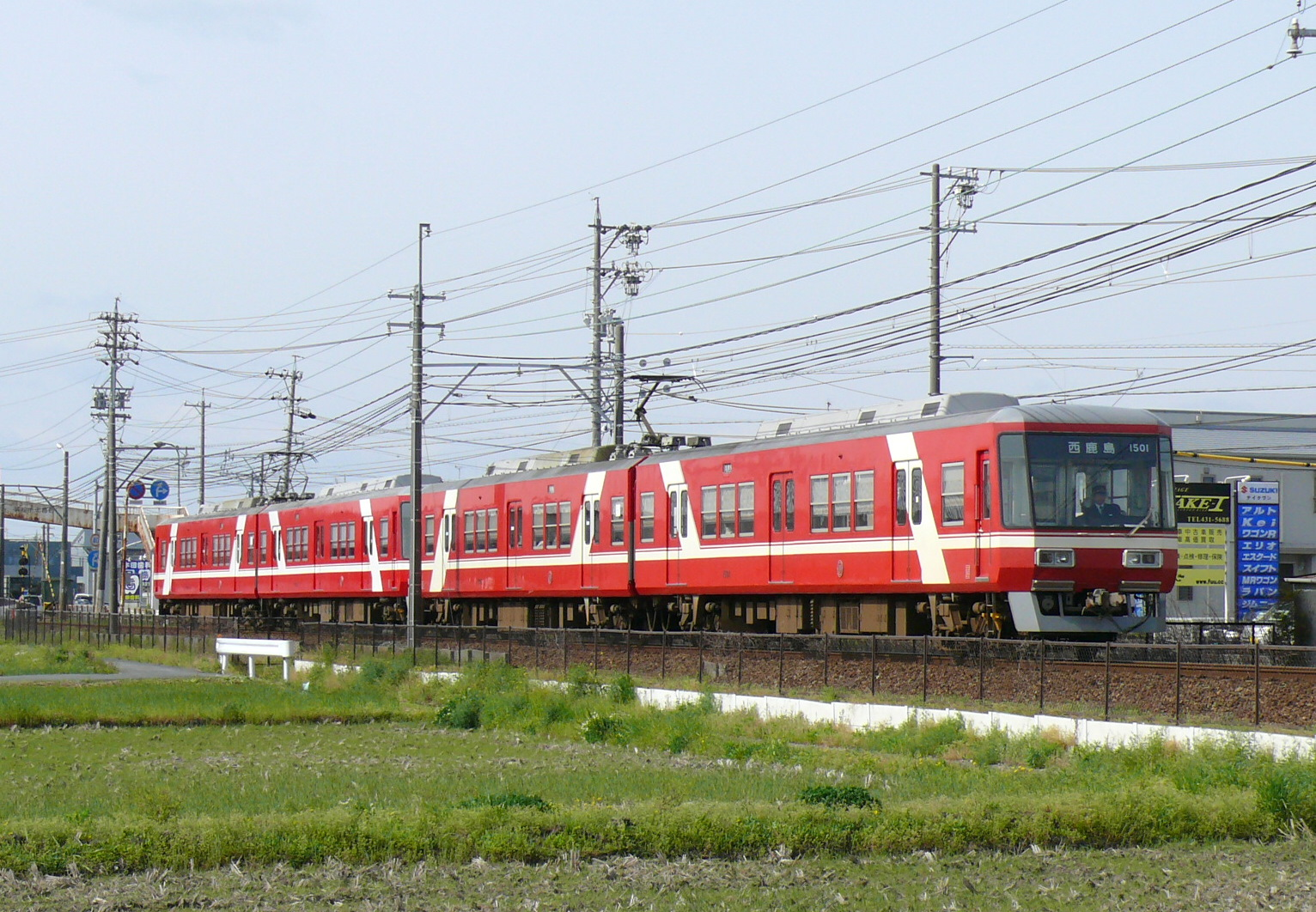
A train on the Enshū Railway Line, the setting for the urban legend of Kisaragi Station.

Due to "Hasumi" stating that she rode a train on a private railway in Shizuoka Prefecture from Shin-Hamamatsu Station, Kisaragi Station was suspected to be in an otherworldly location connected by the Enshū Railway Line. However, some pointed out a contradiction: it takes approximately 33 minutes to ride a train from Shin-Hamamatsu to Nishi-Kajima Station, the end point of the rail line, whereas "Hasumi" reported taking around 40 minutes to arrive to Kisaragi Station. Additionally, people have claimed to have seen the station in Fukuoka Prefecture.

Many have pointed out that Saginomiya Station might be the model for the Kisaragi Station. A reporter in Nikkan Spa, who went to investigate Saginomiya Station in light of the urban legend's popularity, stated that it bore no resemblance to the urban legend of Kisaragi Station, specifically pointing out discrepancies such as the Saginomiya Station having an attendant present as well as heavy traffic and a large density of buildings around it. However, according to an Enshū Railway worker, there wasn't a convenience store nor any bicycle parking around Saginomiya Station back in 2004 when the urban legend was posted; the worker also stated that it used to be darker.

Later, many posts about escaping the station—along with adjacent stations such as Yami Station and Katasu Station—were made, sometimes including images of a station alleged to be Kisaragi Station. Later, however, these such images were discovered to be of Misedani Station and Nishi-Aioi Station instead. Most stories also claimed the distortion of time and malfunctioning GPS in the area.

=== Escape ===
The stories of Kisaragi Station originally led to fears that nobody would be able to return home if they entered it, as "Hasumi" disappeared after her posts. However, some people claimed to have successfully escaped the area through actions like calling for help. Additionally, according to a post made in 2018, a person claimed to have escaped with help from a friendly conductor and local residents.

Some have also stated that the focus of the urban legend was actually the romance of traveling to another world, or isekai, rather than the goal of stoking fear.

== Impacts of the urban legend ==
After the topic went viral on Twitter, the urban legend became widely known with internet users, and many phone calls and mails have been sent to Enshū Railway. Many people have since visited Saginomiya Station with the specific belief that it inspired the urban legend. Enshū Railways have advertised the station as the birthplace of the urban legend, and events related to it have been held there.

In 2014, an anonymous user on Google Maps created a spot called "Kisaragi Station" on a pond in the area of University of Tsukuba.

=== Film ===
In 2022, a movie about the urban legend, titled Kisaragi Station, was released, becoming especially popular in regions close to Hamamatsu.

Following the movie's release, Enshū Railway briefly changed the name of Saginomiya Station to Kisaragi Station following the release. In the same year, they also sold a replica train tickets with Kisaragi Station as a destination; they sold out after an hour.

=== Music ===
In 2020, a song based on the urban legend was released by a YouTuber under the username x0o0x_. The video, has no visible title, achieved through the use of an invisible character unicode, similarly used for the channel's display name. On other streaming platforms, such as Spotify, the song is titled as "/ / // / /". It has amassed a wide audience online, playing a role in the legend's popularity.

In 2021, popular Japanese EDM artist Camellia (かめりあ) created a track based on the urban legend for his album U.U.F.O, which is themed around various Urban Legends.

== Name ==
The kanji for Kisaragi Station was not stated in the original post, hence why hiragana is used instead for writing the station's name.

In Chinese, the station is often written as "如月車站," and some posts in Japanese also use the name "如月駅". (See 如月 on Wiktionary)

Other names for Kisaragi Station, such as "鬼駅", have also seen in several posts but are not widely recognized.

== See also ==
- Japanese urban legends
- The Ghost Train (play)
- Tsuchinoko
- Silver Train of Stockholm
