= Corner Game =

Urban legend game

The Corner Game (Korean: 구석놀이), also known as Square (Japanese: スクエア, Hepburn: Sukuea) or Four Corners Game (simplified Chinese: 四角游戏; traditional Chinese: 四角遊戲), is an urban legend game circulated in East Asia. The game requires four players and can allegedly summon a supernatural entity.

== Origin ==
The origin of the game is unclear. Lucia Peters, author of The Ghost In My Machine, says the game may be "Korean in origin". According to Japanese author Hirouji Matsuyama, however, the game is based on a Japanese story in which one of the five climbers was killed on a snowy mountain before a snowstorm broke out. The remaining four people carried his body to a hut without heating, and then the four people played the game in the house to summon the soul of the dead to shelter them until the rescue team arrived. Some medias in China and Taiwan also claim that the game originated in Japan.

== Ritual ==
The ritual requires four people and an empty room. One possible version includes:

1. Clear the room and make sure there are no other people and animals in it.
2. Turn off as many light sources as possible, except for the lights in the empty room.
3. Everyone enters the room and shouts their name three times after entering the room.
4. Designate one person to be the speaker, and no one else but the speaker should speak without permission after this step.
5. Close the door and turn off the lights.
6. Each person chooses a corner to stand and face; a corner should not have more than one person.
7. Once every corner is occupied as described above, the speaker counts to three then gives the order to move; at this point the four corner individuals rotate (switch corners) in a clockwise direction. "Supernatural" situations such as one extra person and one less person are said to occur during the ritual.

According to Lucia Peters:

- If one person is missing, the speaker should instruct everyone to speak their own name backwards three times (don't speak anything other than that), then put their back against the wall, and the person closest to the light should go ahead and turn it on. After that, the person who disappeared will reappear.
- If there is an extra person, the speaker should instruct everyone to gather at the light switch, then each person should speak their own name backwards three times, then turn on the light. After that, open the door and leave the room. Do not speak to the extra person.
