= Hanako-san =

Japanese urban legend

Hanako-san, or Toire no Hanako-san (トイレの花子 (はなこ)さん, "Hanako of the Toilet"), is a Japanese urban legend about the ghost of a young girl named Hanako who haunts lavatories. Like many urban legends, the details of the origins of the legend vary depending on the account; different versions of the story include that Hanako-san is the ghost of a World War II–era girl who was killed while playing hide-and-seek during an air raid, that she was murdered by a parent or stranger, or that she committed suicide in a school toilet due to bullying.

Legends about Hanako-san have achieved some popularity in Japanese schools, where children may challenge classmates to try to summon Hanako-san. The character has been depicted in a variety of media, including films, manga, anime, and video games, and not just as the notorious Hanako-san but in some as Hanako-kun, the male version.

== The legend and its variations ==
According to legend, Hanako-san is the ghost of a young girl who haunts school toilets, and can be described as a yōkai or a yūrei. The details of her physical appearance vary across different sources, but she is commonly described as having a bobbed haircut and as wearing a red skirt or dress. The details of Hanako-san's origins also vary depending on the account; in some versions, Hanako-san was a child who was murdered by a stranger or an abusive parent in a school toilet; in other versions, she was a girl who died by suicide in a school toilet; in still other versions, she was a child who lived during World War II and was killed in an air raid while hiding in a school toilet during a game of hide-and-seek.

To summon Hanako-san, it is often said that individuals must enter a girls' toilet (usually on the third floor of a school), knock three times on the third stall, and ask if Hanako-san is present. If Hanako-san is there, she will reply with some variation of "Yes, I am." Depending on the story, the individual may then witness the appearance of a bloody or ghostly hand; the hand, or Hanako-san herself, may pull the individual into the toilet, which may lead to Hell; or the individual may be eaten by a three-headed lizard who claims that the individual was invading Hanako's privacy.

== History ==
Author and folklorist Matthew Meyer has described the legend of Hanako-san as dating back to the 1950s. Michael Dylan Foster, author of The Book of Yōkai: Mysterious Creatures of Japanese Folklore, has stated that Hanako-san "is well known because it is essentially an 'urban legend' associated with schools all over Japan. Since the 1990s, it has also been used in films, so it became part of popular culture ... not just orally transmitted or local folklore". In 2014, an article published by NPR described Hanako-san as having "become a fixture of Japanese urban folklore over the last 70 years".

== In popular culture ==
The Hanako-san character has appeared in film, literature, manga, anime, and video games. She made her first cinematic appearance in the 1995 film Toire no Hanako-san, directed by Joji Matsuoka, in which she is depicted as the benevolent spirit of a girl who committed suicide, and who haunts the toilet of a school. She was later depicted in the 1998 film Shinsei Toire no Hanako-san, directed by Yukihiko Tsutsumi, in which she is portrayed as a vengeful ghost who haunts the middle school that she attended before she died. She is also depicted in the 2013 films Toire no Hanako-san: Shin Gekijōban, directed by Masafumi Yamada, and Senritsu Kaiki File Kowasugi! File 04: The Truth! Hanako-san in the Toilet, directed by Koji Shiraishi.

Hanako-san appears in the manga series Hanako and the Terror of Allegory, written and illustrated by Sakae Esuno, as the roommate and friend of Daisuke Aso, a private detective who investigates urban legends. Hanako-san has also been depicted in the manga series Toilet-Bound Hanako-kun by AidaIro—which debuted in 2014—in which the character is portrayed as a young boy. An anime television series adaptation of Toilet-Bound Hanako-kun produced by Lerche premiered in early 2020. Other anime series which feature the Hanako-san character include Kyōkai no Rinne, GeGeGe no Kitarō, and Ghost Stories. Hanako-san also appears in the anime and video game franchise Yo-kai Watch but is renamed Toiletta in the English versions.

The Hanako-san legend was also incorporated into the 2020 young adult short story "Who's at the Door?".

Hanako-San also appears in the popular occult based manga Dandadan.

14th Generation Toilet Hanako-san (十四代目トイレの花子さん) is a Japanese idol whose persona is based on Hanako-san. Her music encompasses many of the themes of the Hanako-san legend, including violence, death, revenge, and psychosexual issues.

Hanako has also been seen in the game Spirit Hunter: Death Mark II as the first ghost the main protagonist faces. In Breath of Fire II, at the Magic School in HomeTown, there is a female NPC in the upstairs bathroom. If you talk to her, you get the dialogue: "Aaaugh! It's Hanako!"

The urban legend is the subject of the 2022 single "HANAKO" by the Japanese girl group Atarashii Gakko!. The single's music video features the group writing the legend on a chalk board, before going into the bathroom to summon Hanako-san. The video concludes with the group's leader, Suzuka, emerging from the stall dressed as Hanako-san.

== See also ==
- Aka Manto ("Red Cape"), a Japanese urban legend about a spirit which appears in toilets
- Akaname, a Japanese yōkai said to lick the filth in bathrooms and bathtubs
- Bloody Mary, an urban legend about an apparition who appears in mirrors
- Madam Koi Koi, an African urban legend of a ghost who haunts schools
- Moaning Myrtle, a toilet-dwelling ghost in the Harry Potter book series
- Teke Teke, a Japanese urban legend about the spirit of a girl with no legs
