= List of mergers in Shizuoka Prefecture =

Here is a list of mergers in Shizuoka Prefecture, Japan since the Heisei era.

== Mergers from April 1, 1999 to Present ==
Sources:

- On April 1, 2004 - The former cities of Shimizu and Shizuoka were merged to create the designated city of Shizuoka. The former city of Shimizu is co-extensive to current Shimizu-ku.
- On April 1, 2004 - The former town of Omaezaki (from Haibara District) absorbed the town of Hamaoka (from Ogasa District) to create the city of Omaezaki.
- On April 1, 2004 - The towns of Amagiyugashima, Nakaizu, Shuzenji and Toi (all from Tagata District) were merged to create the city of Izu.
- On January 17, 2005 - The former town Kikugawa absorbed the town of Ogasa (both from Ogasa District) to create the city of Kikugawa.
- On April 1, 2005 - The towns of Izunagaoka, Nirayama and Ohito (all from Tagata District) were merged to create the city of Izunokuni.
- On April 1, 2005 - The village of Kamo (from Kamo District) was merged into the expanded town of Nishiizu.
- On April 1, 2005 - The town of Asaba (from Iwata District) was merged into the expanded city of Fukuroi.
- On April 1, 2005 - The old city of Kakegawa absorbed the towns of Daitō and Ōsuka (both from Ogasa District) to create the new and expanded city of Kakegawa. Ogasa District was dissolved as a result of this merger.
- On April 1, 2005 - The old city of Iwata absorbed the towns of Fukude, Ryūyō and Toyoda, and the village of Toyooka (all from Iwata District) to create the new and expanded city of Iwata.
- On April 1, 2005 - The village of Heda (from Tagata District) was merged into the expanded city of Numazu.
- On May 5, 2005 - the old city of Shimada absorbed the town of Kanaya (from Haibara District) to create the new and expanded city of Shimada (2nd one).
- On July 1, 2005 - The old city of Hamamatsu absorbed the cities of Tenryū and Hamakita, the town of Haruno (from Shūchi District), the towns of Hosoe, Inasa and Mikkabi (all from Inasa District), the towns of Misakubo and Sakuma, the village of Tatsuyama (all from Iwata District), and the towns of Maisaka and Yūtō (both from Hamana District) to create the new and all merged into the expanded city of Hamamatsu. Inasa District and Iwata District were both dissolved as a result of this merger and also there are no more villages left in Shizuoka Prefecture as a result of this merger.
- On September 20, 2005 - The towns of Honkawane and Nakakawane (both from Haibara District) were merged to create the town of Kawanehon.
- On October 11, 2005 - The towns of Haibara and Sagara (both from Haibara District) were merged to create the city of Makinohara.
- On March 1, 2006 - The town of Kanbara (from Ihara District) was merged into the expanded city of Shizuoka, specifically at Shimizu-ku.
- On April 1, 2008 - The town of Kawane (from Haibara District) was merged into the expanded city of Shimada (2nd one).
- On November 1, 2008 - The town of Fujikawa (from Ihara District) was merged into the expanded city of Fuji.
- On November 1, 2008 - the town of Yui (from Ihara District) was merged into the expanded city of Shizuoka, specifically at Shimizu-ku. Ihara District was dissolved as a result of this merger.
- On November 1, 2008 - The town of Ōigawa (from Shida District) was merged into the expanded city of Yaizu; leaving Shida District with one municipality.
- On January 1, 2009 - The town of Okabe (from Shida District) was merged into the expanded city of Fujieda. Shida District was dissolved as a result of this merger.
- On March 23, 2010 - The town of Shibakawa (from Fuji District) was merged into the expanded city of Fujinomiya. Fuji District was dissolved as a result of this merger.
- On March 23, 2010 - The town of Arai (from Hamana District) was merged into the expanded city of Kosai. Hamana District was dissolved as a result of this merger.
