= List of municipal flags of Chūbu region =

This page lists the municipal flags of Chūbu region, Japan. It is a part of the List of Japanese municipal flags, which is split into regions due to its size.

== Complete lists of Japanese municipal flags pages ==
The regions of Japan. From northeast to southwest: Hokkaidō (red), Tōhoku (yellow), Kantō (green), Chūbu (cyan), Kansai (violet), Chūgoku (orange), Shikoku (purple), and Kyūshū & Okinawa (grey).

- List of municipal flags of Hokkaidō
- List of municipal flags of Tōhoku region
- List of municipal flags of Kantō region
- List of municipal flags of Chūbu region
- List of municipal flags of Kansai region
- List of municipal flags of Chūgoku region
- List of municipal flags of Shikoku
- List of municipal flags of Kyūshū

== Niigata Prefecture ==
=== Cities ===
Agano

Gosen

Itoigawa

Jōetsu

Kamo

Kashiwazaki

Minamiuonuma

Mitsuke

Murakami

Myōkō

Nagaoka

Nagaoka (ceremonial)

Niigata

Ojiya

Sado

Sanjō

Shibata

Tainai

Tokamachi

Tsubame

Uonuma

=== Towns and villages ===
Aga

Awashimaura

Izumozaki

Kariwa

Seiro

Sekikawa

Tagami

Tsunan

Yahiko

Yuzawa

Yuzawa (ceremonial)

=== Historical ===
Ajikata (1977–2005)

Arakawa (1971–2008)

Asahi (1964–2008)

Bunsui (1965–2006)

Gosen (1950–2006)

Hirokami (1964–2004)

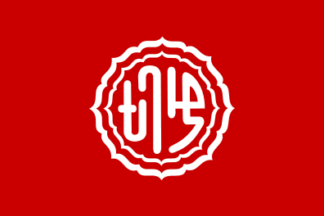
Horinouchi (1950–2004)

Irihirose (????–2004)

Itakura (1958–2005)

Iwamuro (1965–2005)

Kajikawa (1962–2005)

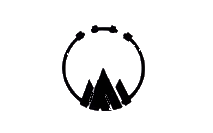
Kakizaki (1955–2005)

Kameda (1975–2005)

Kamihayashi (1968–2008)

Kamikawa (1964–2005)

Kanose (1966–2005)

Katahigashi (1967–2005)

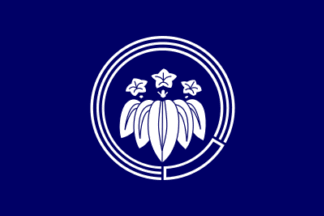
Kawaguchi (1967–2005)

Kawanishi (1968–2005)

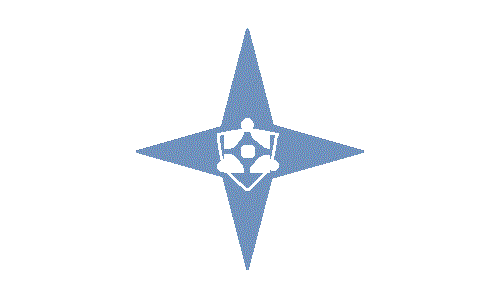
Kiyosato (1962–2005)

Koide (1940–2005)

Koshiji (1956–2005)

Kosudo (1970–2005)

Kubiki (1966–2005)

Kurokawa (1962–2005)

Kyogase (1974–2004)

Maki, Higashikubiki (1921–2005)

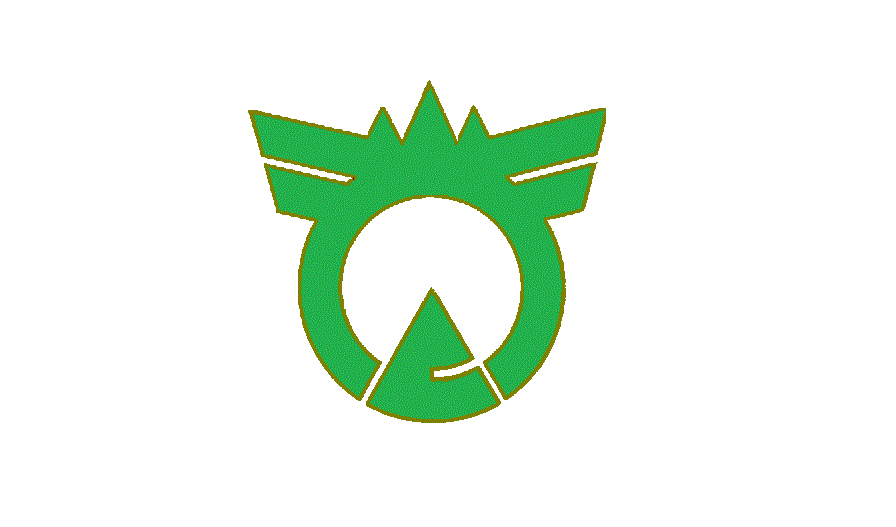
Maki, Nishikanbara (1955–2005)

Matsudai (1919–2005)

Matsunoyama (1959–2005)

Mikawa (1966–2005)

Muikamachi (1957–2005)

Muramatsu (1975–2006)

Myōkō (1984–2005)

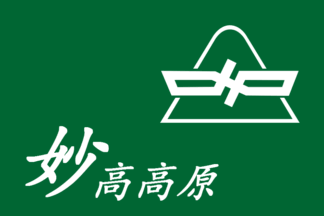
Myōkōkōgen (1967–2005)

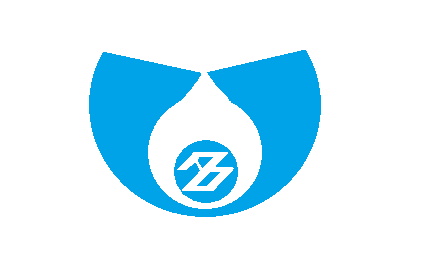
Nadachi (1975–2005)

Nakagō (1986–2005)

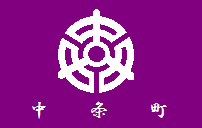
Nakajō (1962–2005)

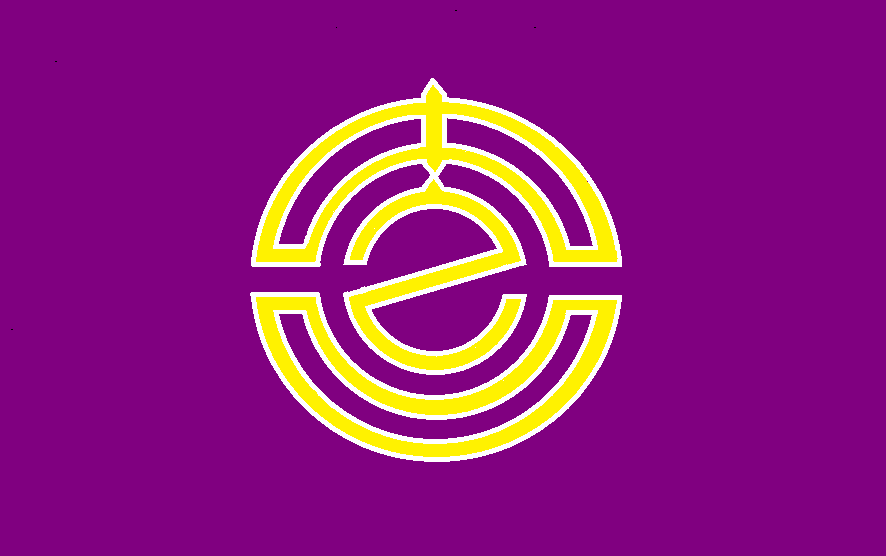
Nakanokuchi (1974–2005)

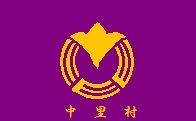
Nakasato (1966–2005)

Niitsu (1951–2005)

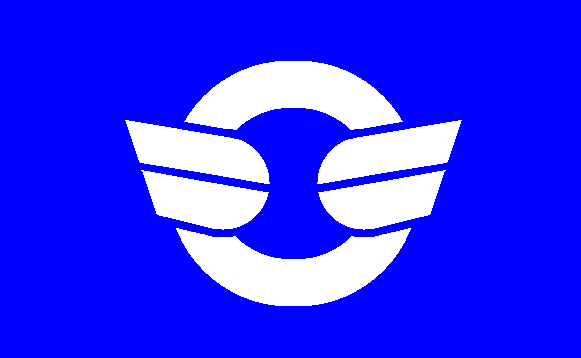
Nishikawa (1966–2005)

Nishiyama (1963–2005)

Nō (1974–2005)

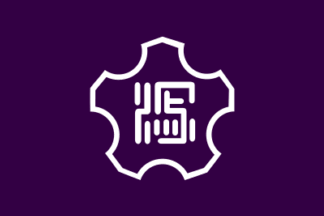
Ōgata (1957–2005)

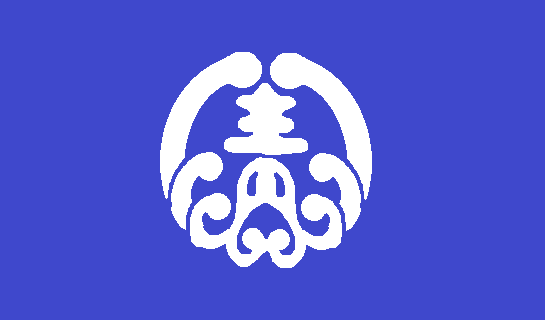
Ōmi (1954–2005)

Ōshima (1967–2005)

Ryōtsu (1955–2004)

Sakae (1967–2005)

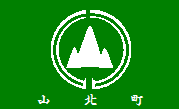
Sanpoku (1965–2008)

Sanwa (1965–2005)

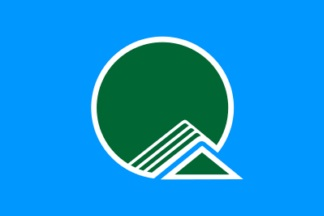
Sasagami (1992–2004)

Shiozawa (1965–2005)

Shirone (1955–2005)

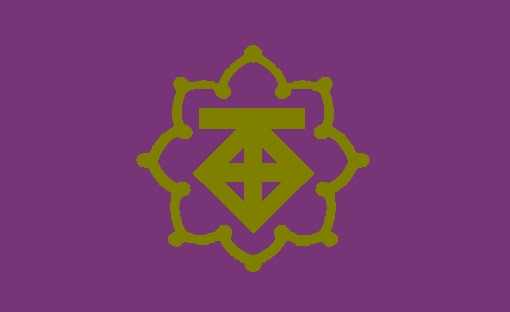
Shitada (1968–2005)

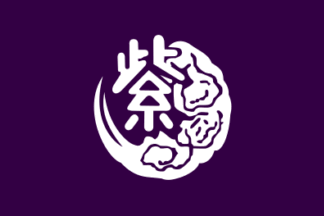
Shiunji (1962–2005)

Suibara (1935–2004)

Sumon (1966–2004)

Takayanagi (1976–2005)

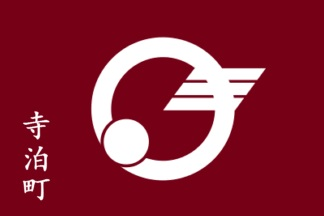
Teradomari (1957–2006)

Tochio (1959–2006)

Toyosaka (1959–2005)

Tsubame (1962–2006)

Tsugawa (1963–2005)

Tsukigata (1963–2005)

Uragawara (1965–2005)

Washima (1955–2006)

Yamato (1962–2004)

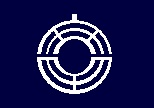
Yasuda (1960–2004)

Yasuzuka (1965–2005)

Yoita (1955–2006)

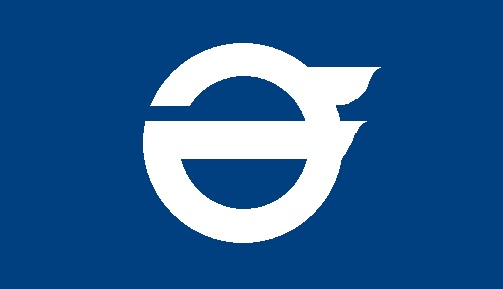
Yokogoshi (1970–2005)

Yoshida (1962–2006)

Yoshikawa (1955–2005)

Yunotani (1965–2004)

== Toyama Prefecture ==
=== Cities ===
Himi

Imizu

Kurobe

Namerikawa

Nanto

Oyabe

Takaoka

Tonami

Toyama

Uozu

=== Towns and villages ===
Asahi

Funahashi

Kamiichi

Nyuzen

Tateyama

=== Historical ===
Fuchu (1952–2005)

Fukumitsu (1955–2004)

Fukuno (1927–2004)

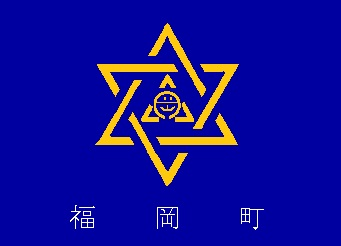
Fukuoka (1924–2005)

Hosoiri (1924–2005)

Inami (1954–2004)

Inokuchi (1978–2004)

Jōhana (1973–2004)

Kamitaira

Kurobe (1954–2006)

Kosugi

Ōsawano

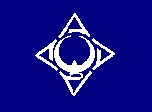
Ōshima

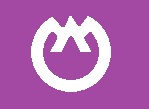
Ōyama

Shinminato

Taira

Takaoka (1916–2005)

Toga

Tonami (1954–2004)

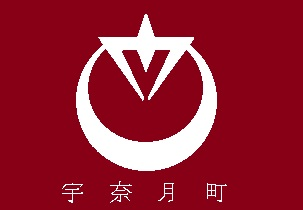
Unazuki

Yamada

Yatsuo

== Ishikawa Prefecture ==
=== Cities ===
Hakui

Hakusan

Kaga

Kahoku

Kanazawa

Komatsu

Nanao

Nonoichi

Nomi

Suzu

Wajima

=== Towns ===
Anamizu

Hōdatsushimizu

Kawakita

Nakanoto

Noto

Shika

Tsubata

Uchinada

=== Historical ===
Kaga (1958–2005)

Kashima

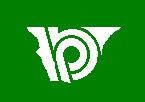
Kawachi

Mattō

Mikawa

Monzen

Nakajima

Nanatsuka

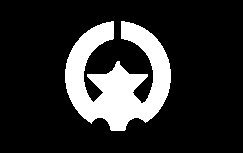
Neagari

Noto, Fugeshi (1975–2005)

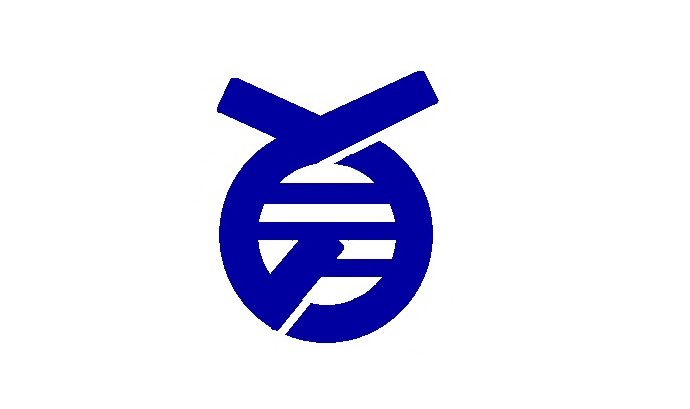
Notojima

Oguchi

Oshimizu

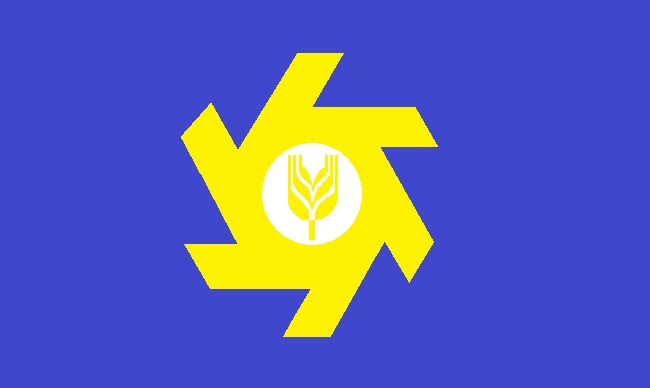
Rokusei

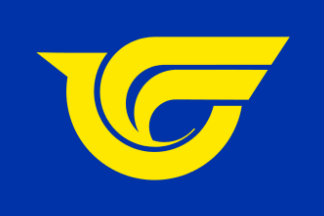
Shika (1971–2005)

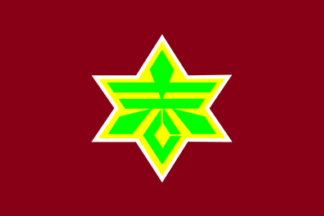
Shio

Shiramine

Takamatsu

Tatsunokuchi

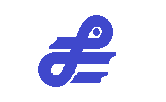
Tatsuruhama

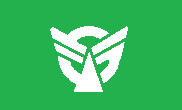
Terai

Togi

Torigoe

Toriya

Tsurugi

Uchiura

Unoke

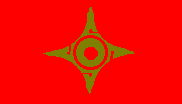
Wajima (1957–2006)

Yamanaka

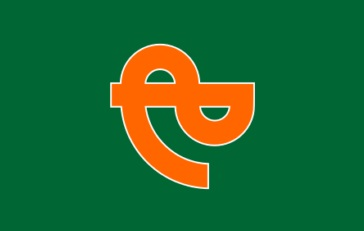
Yanagida

Yoshinodani

== Fukui Prefecture ==
=== Cities ===
Awara

Echizen

Fukui

Katsuyama

Obama

Ōno

Sabae

Sakai

Tsuruga

=== Towns and villages ===
Echizen (town)

Eiheiji

Ikeda

Mihama

Minamiechizen

Ōi

Takahama

Wakasa

=== Historical ===
Asahi

Awara (1984–2004)

Echizen (town, 1962–2005)

Eiheiji (1962–2006)

Harue

Imadate

Imajō

Izumi

Kaminaka

Kamishihi

Kanadu

Kōno

Koshino

Maruoka

Matsuoka

Mikata

Mikuni

Miyama

Miyazaki

Nanjō

Natashō

Ōi (1959–2006)

Ota

Sakai (1961–2006)

Shimizu

Takefu

== Yamanashi Prefecture ==
=== Cities ===
Chūō

Fuefuki

Fujiyoshida

Hokuto

Hokuto (variant)

Kai

Kōfu

Kōshū

Minami-Alps

Nirasaki

Ōtsuki

Tsuru

Uenohara

Yamanashi

=== Towns and villages ===
Dōshi

Fujikawa

Fujikawaguchiko

Hayakawa

Ichikawamisato

Kosuge

Minobu

Nanbu

Narusawa

Nishikatsura

Oshino

Shōwa

Tabayama

Yamanakako

=== Historical ===
Akeno

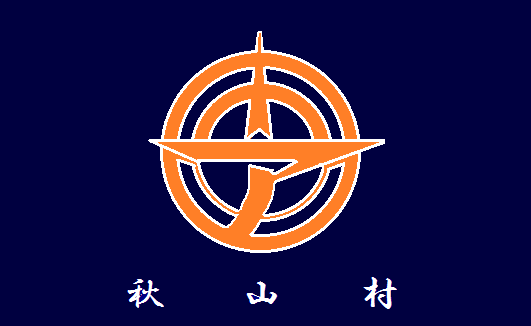
Akiyama

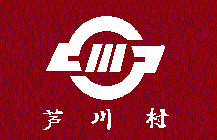
Ashigawa

Ashiwada

Ashiyasu

Enzan

Futaba

Hakushū

Hatta

Ichikawadaimon

Ichinomiya

Isawa

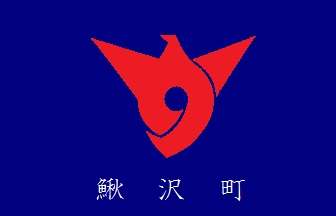
Kajikazawa

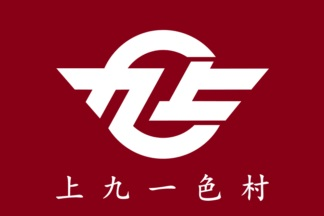
Kamikuishiki

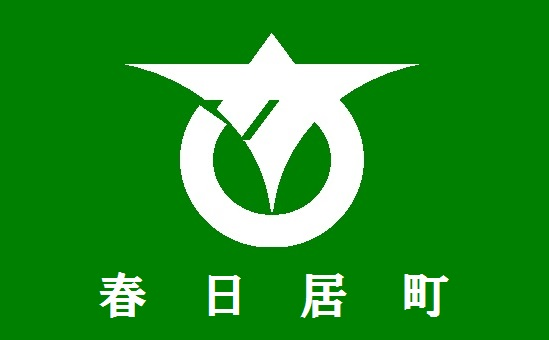
Kasugai

Katsunuma

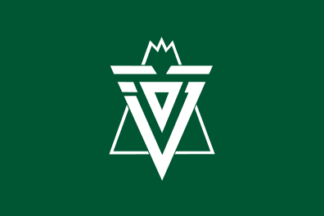
Kawaguchiko

Kobuchisawa

Kōsai

Kushigata

Makioka

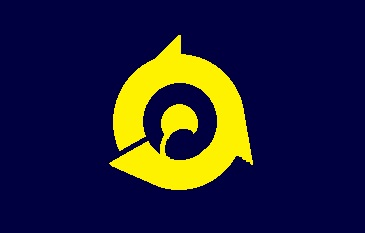
Masuho

Minobu (1959–2005)

Misaka

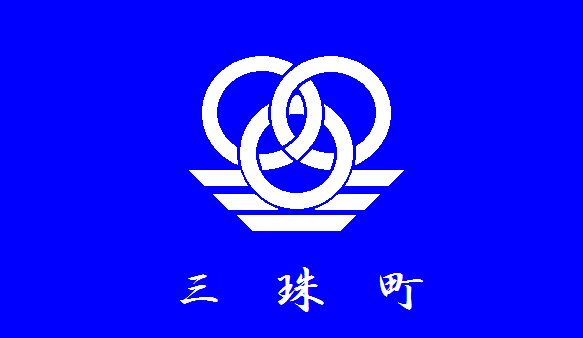
Mitama

Mitomi

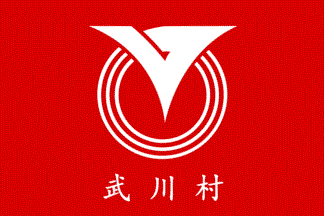
Mukawa

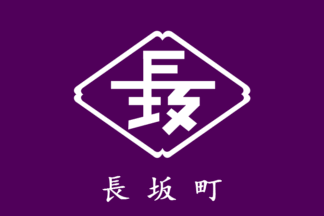
Nagasaka

Nakamichi

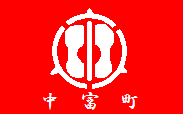
Nakatomi

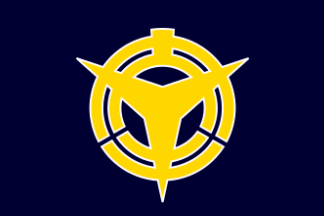
Nanbu (1965–2004)

Ōizumi

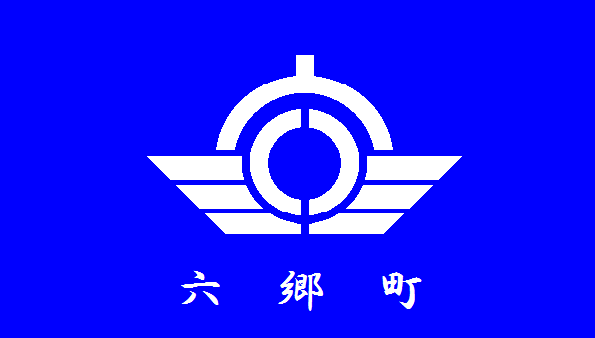
Rokugō

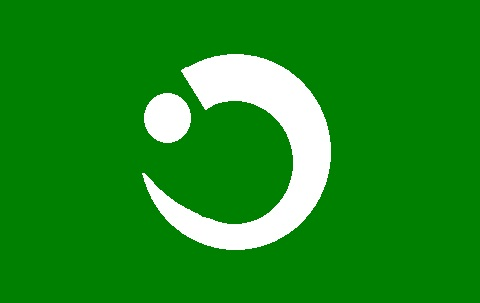
Ryūō

Sakaigawa

Shikishima

Shimobe

Shirane

Sutama

Takane

Tamaho

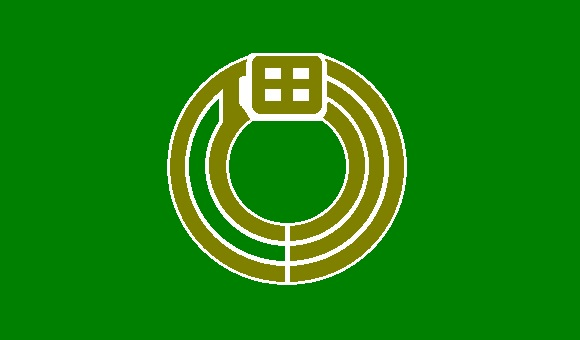
Tatomi

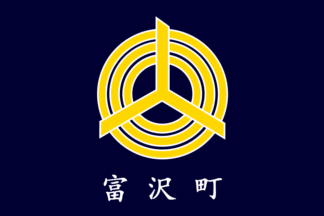
Tomisawa

Toyotomi

Uenohara (1956–2005)

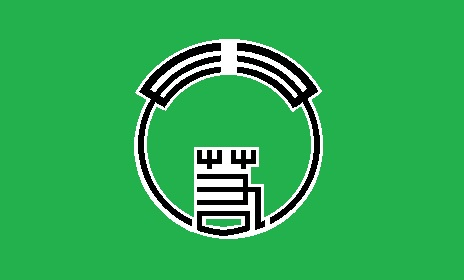
Wakakusa

Yamato

Yatsushiro

Yamanashi (1954–2005)

== Nagano Prefecture ==
=== Cities ===
Azumino

Chikuma

Chino

Iida

Iiyama

Ina

Komagane

Komoro

Matsumoto

Nagano

Nakano

Okaya

Ōmachi

Saku

Shiojiri

Suwa

Suzaka

Tōmi

Tōmi (fringed)

Ueda

=== Towns and villages ===
Achi

Agematsu

Anan

Aoki

Asahi

Chikuhoku

Fujimi

Hakuba

Hara

Hiraya

Iijima

Iizuna

Ikeda

Ikusaka

Karuizawa

Kawakami

Kijimadaira

Kiso (town)

Kiso (village)

Kitaaiki

Koumi

Matsukawa (town)

Matsukawa (village)

Minamiaiki

Minamimaki

Minamiminowa

Minowa

Miyada

Miyota

Nagawa

Nagiso

Nakagawa

Neba

Nozawaonsen

Obuse

Ogawa

Ōkuwa

Omi

Ōshika

Ōtaki

Otari

Sakae

Sakaki

Sakuho

Shimojō

Shimosuwa

Shinano

Takagi

Takamori

Takayama

Tateshina

Tatsuno

Tenryū

Toyooka

Urugi

Yamagata

Yamanouchi

Yasuoka

=== Historical ===
Akashina

Asashina

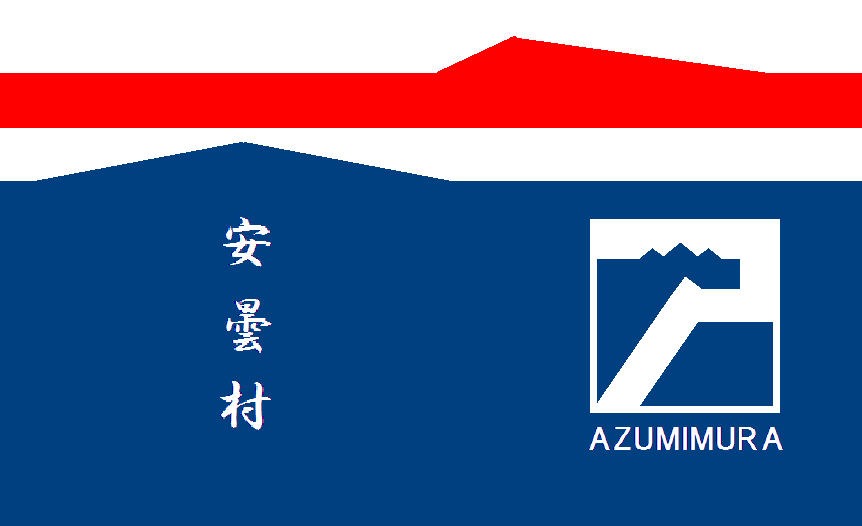
Azumi

Azusagawa

Hase

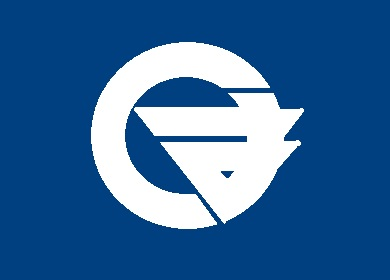
Hata

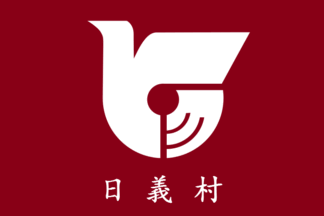
Hiyoshi

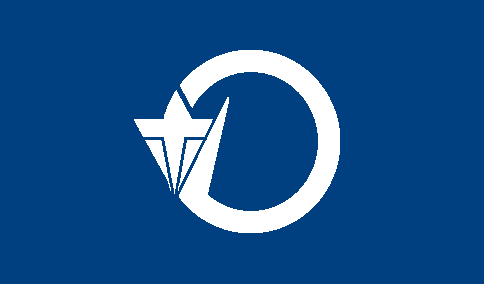
Honjō

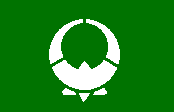
Horigane

Hotaka

Ina (1954–2006)

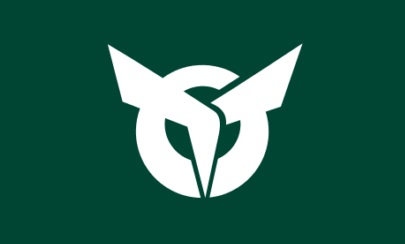
Kaida

Kami

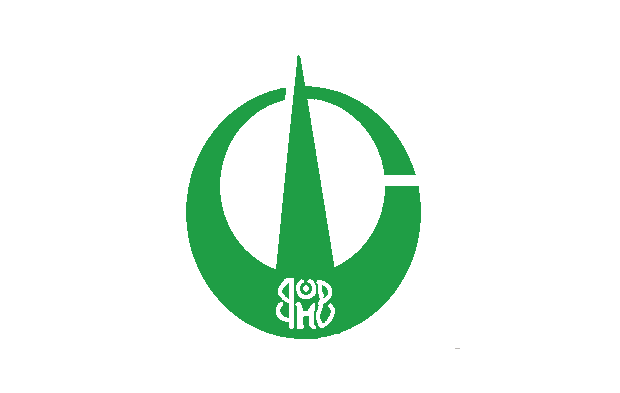
Kamisato

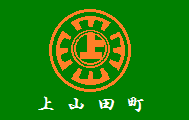
Kamiyamada (1915–1985)

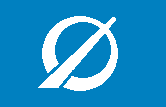
Kamiyamada (1985–2003)

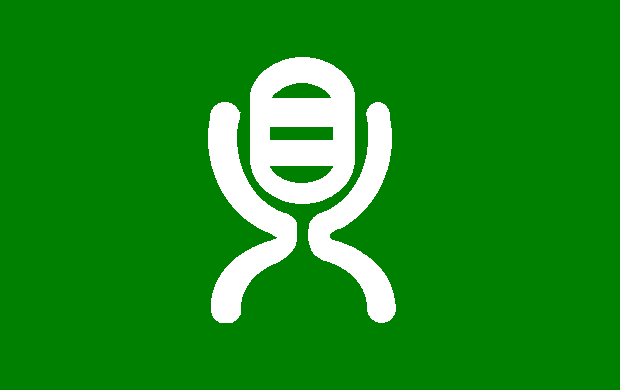
Kanae

Kinasa

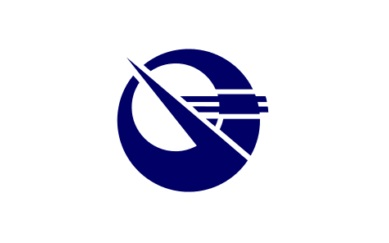
Kisofukushima

Kitamimaki

Kōshoku

Maruko

Miasa

Minamishinano

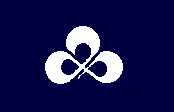
Misato

Mitake

Mochizuki

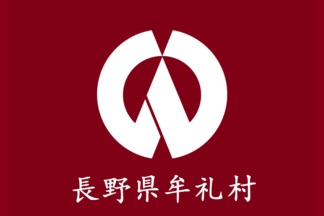
Mure

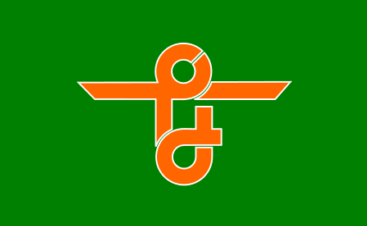
Nagato

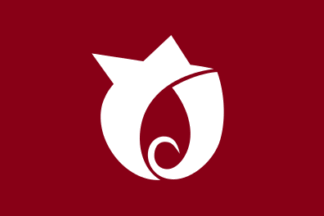
Nagawa (village)

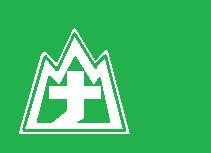
Nakajō

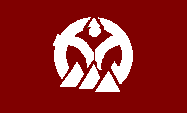
Namiai

Narakawa

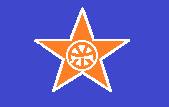
Ōoka

Sakai

Sakakita

Saku (city, 1962–2005)

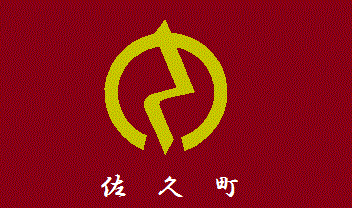
Saku (town)

Samizu

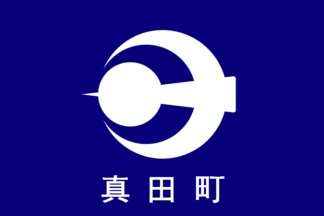
Sanada

Seinaiji

Shiga

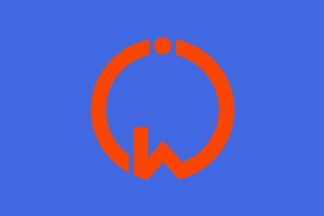
Shinshūshinmachi

Takatō

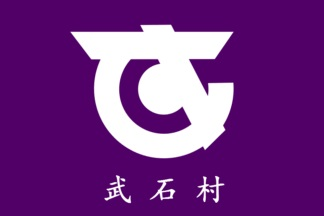
Takeshi

Tōbu

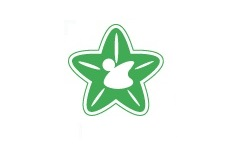
Togakushi

Togura

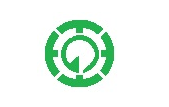
Toyono

Toyoshina

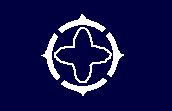
Toyota

Ueda (1950–2006)

Usuda

Wada

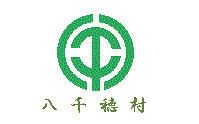
Yachiho

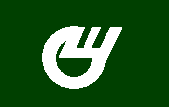
Yamaguchi

Yasaka

== Gifu Prefecture ==
=== Cities ===
Ena

Gero

Gifu

Gujō

Hashima

Hida

Kakamigahara

Kani

Kaizu

Mino

Minokamo

Mizuho

Mizunami

Motosu

Nakatsugawa

Ōgaki

Seki

Tajimi

Takayama

Toki

Yamagata

=== Towns and villages ===
Anpachi

Ginan

Gōdo

Hichisō

Higashishirakawa

Ibigawa

Ikeda

Kasamatsu

Kawabe

Kitagata

Mitake

Ōno

Sakahogi

Sekigahara

Shirakawa (town)

Shirakawa (village)

Tarui

Tomika

Wanouchi

Yaotsu

Yōrō

=== Historical ===
Akechi

Asahi

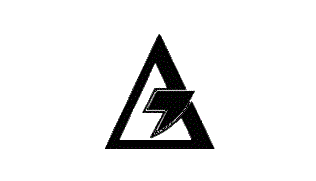
Fujihashi

Fukuoka

Furukawa (1956–2004)

Gero (1958–2004)

Hachiman

Hagiwara (1960–2004)

Hirata

Hirukawa

Horado

Hozumi (1955–2003)

Ibigawa (1955–2005)

Ijira (1973–2003)

Itadori

Itonuki (1969–2004)

Iwamura

Kaizu (1965–2005)

Kamiishizu

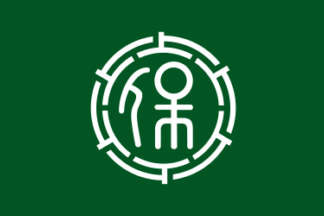
Kaminoho

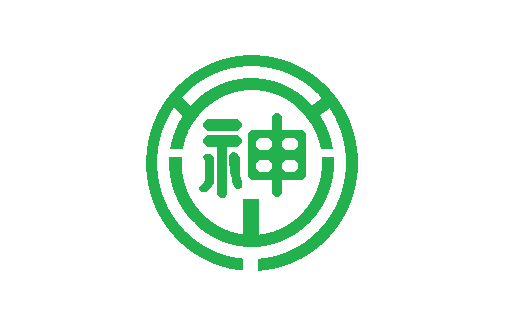
Kamioka (through 1975)

Kamioka (1975–2004)

Kamitakara

Kamiyahagi

Kanayama (1965–2004)

Kaneyama

Kasahara (1968–2006)

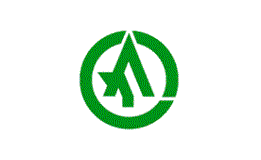
Kashimo

Kasuga

Kawai (1968–2004)

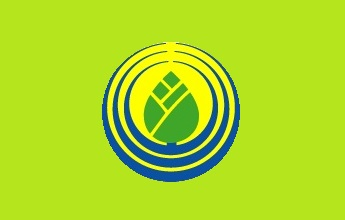
Kawashima

Kawaue (1962–2005)

Kiyomi

Kokufu

Kuguno

Kushihara

Kuze

Maze (1974–2004)

Meihō (1992–2004)

Minami

Miya

Miyagawa (1957–2004)

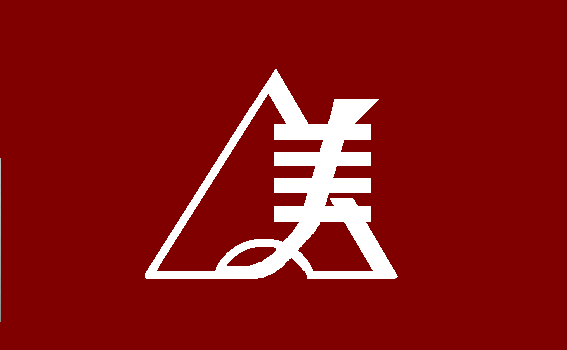
Miyama (1962–2003)

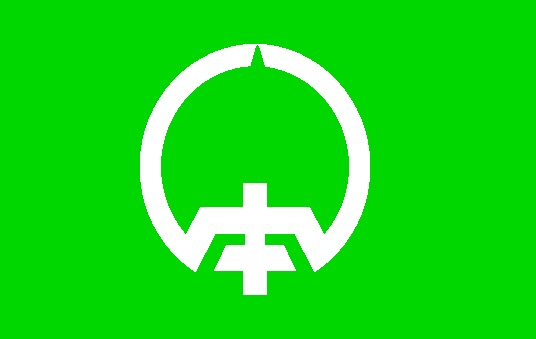
Motosu (town)

Mugegawa

Mugi

Myōgata (1975–1992)

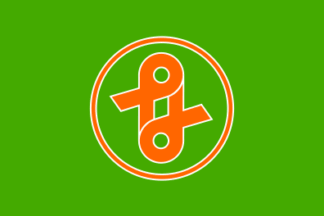
Nannō

Neo (1978–2004)

Nyūkawa

Osaka

Sakashita

Sakauchi

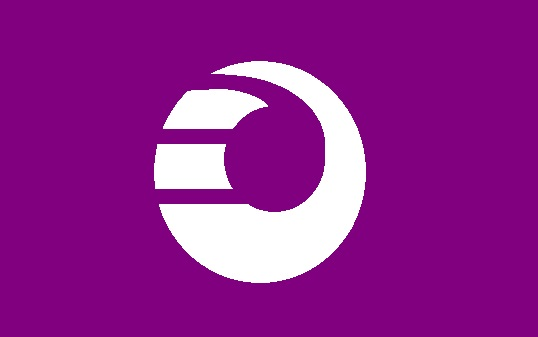
Shinsei (1975–2004)

Shirotori

Shōkawa

Sunami (1974–2003)

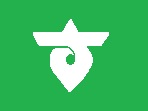
Sunomata

Takane

Takatomi (1972–2003)

Takasu (1973–2004)

Tanigumi

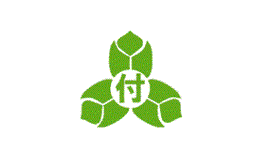
Tsukechi

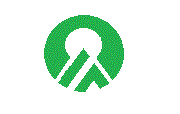
Wara

Yamaoka

Yamato

Yanaizu

== Shizuoka Prefecture ==
=== Cities ===
Atami

Fuji

Fujieda

Fujinomiya

Fukuroi

Gotenba

Hamamatsu

Itō

Iwata

Izu

Izunokuni

Kakegawa

Kikugawa

Kosai

Makinohara

Mishima

Numazu

Omaezaki

Shimada

Shimoda

Shizuoka

Susono

Yaizu

=== Towns and villages ===
Higashiizu

Kannami

Kawanehon

Kawazu

Matsuzaki

Minamiizu

Mori

Nagaizumi

Nishiizu

Oyama

Shimizu

Yoshida

=== Historical ===
Amagiyugashima

Arai

Asaba

Daitō

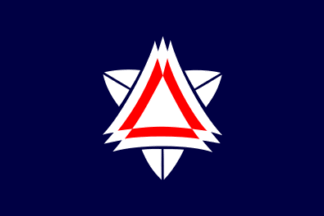
Fujikawa

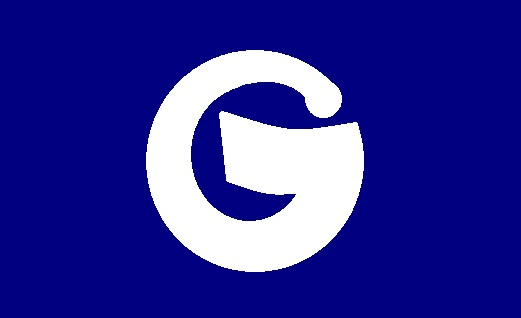
Fukude

Fukuroi (1958–2005)

Haibara

Hamakita

Hamamatsu (1911–2005)

Hamaoka

Haruno

Heda

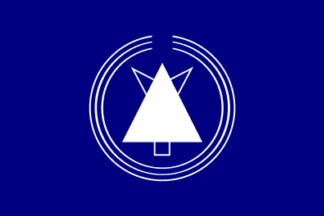
Honkawane

Hosoe

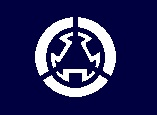
Inasa

Iwata (1947–2005)

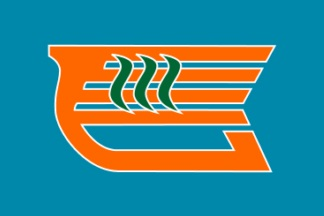
Izunagaoka

Kakegawa (1956–2005)

Kami (1972–1991)

Kamo

Kanaya

Kanbara

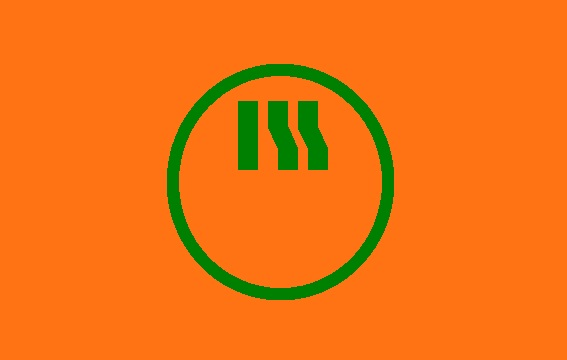
Kawane

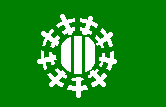
Kikukawa (1954–2005)

Maisaka

Mikkabi

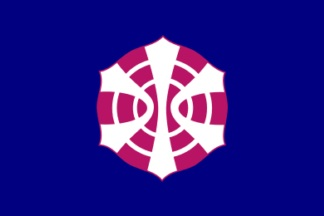
Misakubo

Nakaizu

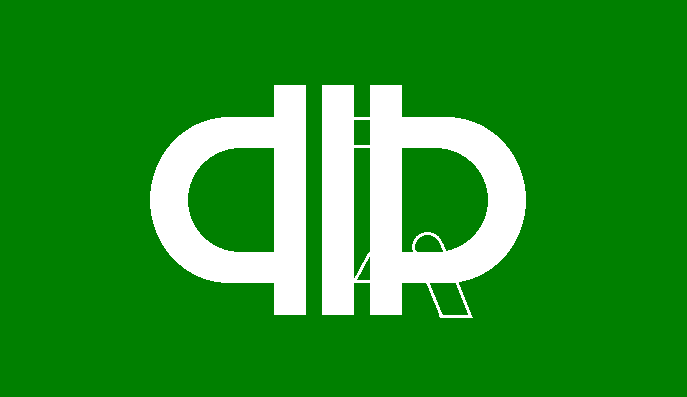
Nakakawane

Nirayama

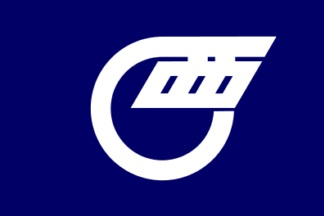
Nishiizu (1966–2005)

Ogasa

Ōhito

Ōigawa

Okabe

Omaezaki (1961–2005)

Ōsuka

Ryūyō

Sagara

Sakuma

Shibakawa

Shimada (1915–2005)

Shimizu (city, 1953–2003)

Shizuoka (1964–2003)

Shuzenji

Tatsuyama

Tenryū

Toi

Toyoda

Toyooka

Yui

Yūtō

== Aichi Prefecture ==
=== Cities ===
Aisai

Ama

Anjō

Chiryū

Chita

Gamagōri

Handa

Hekinan

Ichinomiya

Inazawa

Inuyama

Iwakura

Kariya

Kasugai

Kitanagoya

Kiyosu

Komaki

Kōnan

Miyoshi

Nagakute

Nagoya

Nishio

Nisshin

Okazaki

Ōbu

Owariasahi

Seto

Shinshiro

Tahara

Takahama

Tokoname

Tōkai

Toyoake

Toyohashi

Toyokawa

Toyota

Tsushima

Yatomi

=== Wards ===
Naka

=== Towns and villages ===
Agui

Fusō

Higashiura

Kanie

Kōta

Mihama

Minamichita

Ōguchi

Ōharu

Shitara

Taketoyo

Tobishima

Tōei

Tōgō

Toyone

Toyoyama

=== Historical ===
Akabane (1978–2003)

Asahi (1972–2005)

Asuke (1971–2005)

Atsumi (1968–2005)

Bisai (1955–2005)

Fujioka (1974–2005)

Hachikai (1977–2005)

Haruhi (1973–2008)

Hazu (1967–2011)

Heiwa (1969–2005)

Hōrai (1957–2005)

Ichinomiya (town, 1970–2006)

Inabu (1967–2005)

Isshiki (1966–2011)

Jimokuji (1970–2010)

Jūshiyama (1986–2006)

Kira (1957–2011)

Kisogawa (1960–2005)

Kiyosu (1972–2005)

Kozakai (1972–2010)

Mito (1939–2008)

Miwa (1968–2010)

Nishibiwajima (1969–2005)

Nishiharu (1969–2006)

Nukata (1956–2006)

Obara (1975–2005)

Otowa (1981–2008)

Sakurai (1956–1967)

Saori (1906–2005)

Saya (1955–2005)

Shikatsu (1969–2006)

Shimoyama (1966–2005)

Shinkawa (1964–2005)

Shinshiro (1967–2005)

Shippō (1971–2010)

Shitara (2000–2005)

Sobue (1971–2005)

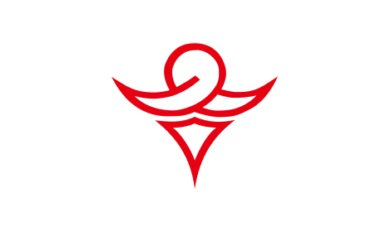
Tahara (1952–2005)

Tatsuta (1977–2005)

Tomiyama (1978–2005)

Tsugu (1975–2005)

Tsukude (1966–2005)
