= Shizuoka dialect =

Japanese dialect

- 静岡弁
- Native to: Japan
- Region: Shizuoka
- Language family: Japonic: Japanese; Eastern Japanese; Tōkai-Tōsan; Shizuoka dialect
- Dialects: Eastern Shizuoka dialect; Central Shizuoka dialect; Western Shizuoka dialect; Ikawa dialect

Language codes
- ISO 639-3: –
- Glottolog: shiz1237
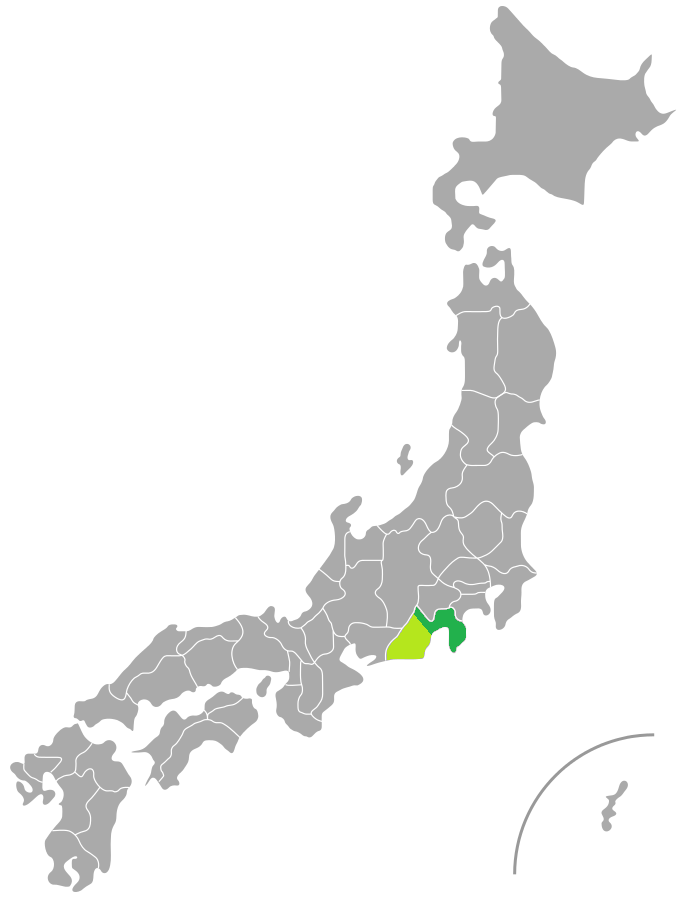
- Shizuoka dialect area with eastern (dark green) and western (light green) features.

The Shizuoka dialect (Japanese: 静岡弁 Shizuoka-ben) is a Japanese dialect spoken in Shizuoka Prefecture. In a narrow sense, this can refer purely to the Central Shizuoka dialect, whilst a broader definition encompasses all Shizuoka dialects. This article will focus on all dialects found in the prefecture.

== Classification and regional variation ==
The dialects in Shizuoka Prefecture are classified as part of the so-called nayashi dialects (ナヤシ方言), a subdivision of the wider Tōkai-Tōsan group, along with its close relatives, the Nagano and Yamanashi dialects. After the nayashi dialects, it is considered most similar to Tokyo and other West Kanto dialects, although in recent decades there has been an increasingly strong resemblance to the national standard, particularly in phonology and pitch accent. Although vocabulary and grammar also tend towards Eastern Japanese in their basic elements, there is a marked increase the further one travels west in the usage of Western Japanese words and phrases, such as oru (おる there is, cognate with iru (いる) in Eastern Japanese) and n (ん (adjective used for negation), cognate with nai (ない)). This makes Shizuoka a well-known example of a prefecture with a noticeable divide between the two main branches of Japanese.

=== Regional variation ===
- Note: It is possible to subdivide Shizuoka dialects into groups based on the former provinces that existed there historically, which results in three dialects: the ‘Izu dialect’, ‘Suruga dialect’ and ‘Enshū dialect’. It is also possible to subdivide using the Ōi River as a boundary between west and east to form an ‘Eastern dialect’, ‘West Suruga dialect’ and ‘Tōtōmi dialect’. Generally, however, the following subdivisions are proposed:
1. Eastern Shizuoka dialect - Includes areas east of the Fuji River; the Izu Peninsula and the eastern part of Suruga. It possesses features of both West Kanto and Nayashi dialects, including usage of the conjectural particle be (べ), not voicing certain vowels and the use of the particles zura (ずら) and ra (ら).
2. Central Shizuoka dialect - Includes areas west of the Fuji River and east of Kakegawa. Includes the western part of Suruga and the eastern part of Enshū. The particle be is noticeably absent, and there is a characteristic usage of the past tense form -ke (-け).
3. Western Shizuoka dialect - Found in areas west of Fukuroi and Mori. Includes all of Enshū save for its eastern region. In place of the invitational form zā (ざあ), which is commonly found in the Central Shizuoka dialect, the phrase maika (まいか) is used instead.
4. Ikawa dialect - Includes the upper reaches of the Ōi River and settlements such as the former village of Ikawa. Due to historical isolation, it retains various archaic expressions and also lacks a pitch accent.

Phrases and particles used across Shizuoka
	Arai	Hamamatsu	Kakegawa	Ikawa	Shizuoka (city)	Fuji, Fujinomiya	Numazu	Izu Peninsula
Vowel unvoicing	Prominent		Not prominent	Prominent	Not prominent	Prominent		
Negative form	-n (-ん)			-n (ん) -nō (のう)	-nyā (にゃあ) -nē (ねぇ) -nai (ない)			-nē (ねぇ) -nai (ない)
Past negative form	nanda (なんだ)		nke (んけ)	-nke (んけ) -nōkke (のーっけ)	-nyākki (にゃあっき) -naikke (ないっけ)	nakatta (なかった)		
iru (居る) or oru (おる)	oru (おる)	iru (居る)						
Conjecture	-dara (だら) -zura (ずら) -ra (ら)						-be (べ) -zura (ずら) -dara (だら) -ra (ら)	
Invitation	maika (まいか)		-maika (まいか) -zā (ざあ)		-zā (ざあ) -zuka (ずか)		-uka (うか) -be yo (べよ)	
Imperative of miru (見る to see)	myō (みょー)				-miro (みろ) -mitekō (みてこう)	miro (みろ)		

=== Western and Eastern divide ===
Grammatical features are often employed as indicators to split Shizuoka dialects between Western and Eastern Japanese. Based on the usage of n (ん) (a western Japanese feature) over nai (ない) (Eastern Japanese), the border between Eastern and Western Japanese is located around Shimada and the Ōi River. In contrast, the Western Japanese imperative form -yo (-よ) (as opposed to -ro (-ろ) in Eastern Japanese) is heard west of the Fuji River in the Central Shizuoka and Western Shizuoka dialects, whilst the Western Japanese present continuous form -toru (-とる, cognate with -te iru (-ている) in Eastern Japanese) is found west of Lake Hamana.

== Phonology ==
=== General features ===
Most notably in the east of the prefecture, consecutive vowel sounds are often merged in the following manner:

- ai (あい) → ē (えぇ), yeā (えぁあ) or yeā (ゃあ).
- oi (おい) and ui (うい) also fuse in a manner similar to what is found in the Nagoya dialect.

Although not generally present in Shimada and west of the Ōi River, vowel merging is sometimes heard around Hamamatsu. For example:

- omae (おまえ you) → omyā (おめぁあ)
- zaisan (ざいさん property) → zyāsan (ぜぁあさん).

In the Eastern Shizuoka and Western Shizuoka dialects there is extensive unvoicing of vowel sounds, with a less pronounced trend in the Central Shizuoka dialect and the inner parts of Enshū (Misakubo and Sakuma) (save for in the upper reaches of the Ōi and Abe Rivers). Also, the object-marking particle wo (を) is not generally pronounced as o (お) as is the case in standard Japanese, but as uo (うお).

=== Pitch accent ===
==== Nouns ====
In concordance with the Tokyo standard pitch accent (excluding areas with no pitch accent), some single-mora nouns like ko (子 child) and hi (日 day) are pronounced flat, whilst certain other single-mora nouns like te (手 hand) or e (絵 picture) become front-mora stressed. In west Shizuoka, two-mora words such as ha-shi (橋 bridge) or ka-wa (川 river) are pronounced flat. The area around Hamamatsu in the far southwest of the prefecture has the most flat-accented words, and the further one travels east, the more final-mora stressed words occur, until virtually all of these types of two-mora words become final-mora stressed as is seen east of the Ōi River. In Maisaka and Arai, depending on whether or not a particle is attached to certain words, pitch accent can change. For example, a-me (雨 rain) (front-mora stressed) becomes a-me when followed by a ga (が) particle: a-me-ga. In comparison to somewhere like Hamamatsu, where words with three or more mora are front-mora stressed, in Maisaka and Arai such words become middle-mora stressed. In the Eastern Shizuoka dialect, three-mora nouns such as asahi (朝日 morning sun) are middle-mora stressed (a-sa-hi), whereas in the Central and Western Shizuoka dialects, these words are front-mora stressed (a-sahi). Some words that are usually pronounced flat, such as usagi (兎 rabbit) or ichigo (苺 strawberry), may become front-mora stressed in western Shizuoka and central Enshū (u-sagi, i-chigo). This is dependent on the area however, with varying degrees of front-mora stress actually occurring, with some areas simply pronouncing it flat. Some three-mora words that are front-mora stressed in the Tokyo standard pitch accent, such as a-tama (頭 head), were pronounced historically with middle-mora stress (a-ta-ma). This is noted to have occurred predominantly in the Sankan area of Enshū, specifically in the former city of Tenryū (in the Tenryū District of Hamamatsu), as well as in Haruno, Mori, the former village of Toyooka in Iwata, and the former town of Nakakawane. This particular feature remains in the northern part of Mikawa in Aichi Prefecture and can be found as far as the southern region of the Shimoina District in Nagano Prefecture.

===== Time-related words =====
There is a strong tendency to pronounce words related to telling the time, like toki (時 time), with a flat tone. Three-mora words relating to time become front-mora stressed, whilst words with more than three mora tend to be middle-mora stressed. The table below shows some examples of this.

Word	Meaning	Standard Japanese	Shizuoka dialect
ichigatsu (一月)	One month	i-chigatsu	i-chi-gatsu
nigatsu (二月)	Two months	ni-gatsu	ni-gatsu
jūichigatsu (十一月)	Eleven months	ju-uichigatsu	ju-uichi-gatsu
jūnigatsu (十二月)	Twelve months	ju-unigatsu	ju-uni-gatsu

==== Verbs ====
In standard Japanese, three-mora verbs tend to be middle-mora stressed or flat, such as ni-ge-ru (逃げる to run away) or kieru (消える to disappear), whereas front-mora stressed words like ha-iru (入る to enter) are rare. This pattern is largely reflected in Shizuoka, save for a few exceptions. In the Central Shizuoka and Western Shizuoka dialects (except for Maisaka and Arai), there is a unique tendency to front-mora stress Ichidan verbs that are usually middle-mora stressed in standard Japanese. For Godan verbs, pitch accent is standard, with predominantly flat or middle-mora stress pronunciation.

Verb	Standard Japanese / Eastern Shizuoka	Central Shizuoka / Western Shizuoka
ageru (上げる to raise up)	a-geru	a-geru
okiru (起きる to wake up)	o-ki-ru	o-kiru

==== Adjectives ====
In standard Japanese, adjectives with three or more mora are usually middle-mora stressed, like shi-ro-i (白い white) or flat, like kurai (暗い dark). Within Shizuoka, the central-west part of Enshū (centred largely around Hamamatsu) front-mora stresses the usually middle-mora stressed adjectives. For example, shi-ro-i becomes shi-roi. Words that are pronounced in a flat tone, however, remain the same as in standard Japanese. In the Central Shizuoka dialect, areas west of Fuji City up to Higashi-Enshū, as well as in the former towns of Hosoe and Mikkabi, the connective form of adjectives become middle-mora stressed as in shi-ro-ku, as opposed to shi-roku as is found in standard Japanese (in addition to areas east of Numazu and several former towns and villages in inner Enshū.

Adjective	Standard Japanese / Eastern Shizuoka / Inner Enshū	Central Shizuoka / Kosai / Kohoku	Central-west Enshū
shiroi (白い white)	shi-ro-i	shi-ro-i	shi-roi
shiroku (白くwhite (continuous form))	shi-roku	shi-ro-ku	shi-roku

==== Other ====
===== -nai (無い) stem =====
In the Central Shizuoka and Western Shizuoka dialects, the 'na' portion of the negative adjective nai (無い) is stressed.

Word	Standard Japanese / Eastern Shizuoka	Central Shizuoka / Western Shizuoka
dekinai (出来ない)	de-ki-nai	de-kina-i
denai (出ない)	de-nai	de-na-i
wakaranai (わからない)	wa-kara-nai	wa-karana-i
shinai (しない)	shinai(flat)	shi-na-i

== Grammar ==
Unless stated otherwise, the following notes are on the grammar of traditional dialects prior to the influence of standard Japanese.

=== Negative form ===
East of the Ōi River, the standard negative form -nai (-ない) is heard, along with -nē (ねぇ) and -nyā (-にゃあ), whilst west of the river, -n (-ん) is used. In the northern Sankan region, -nō (-のぉ) is also said. In the west of the prefecture, the intensifier negative -yashinai (-やしない) may have its ending portion substituted with -sen (せん), -hen (へん) or -shin (しん). Additionally, in all parts of Shizuoka, the negative suspended form -naide... (-ないで...) can become -nakkō... (-なっこぉ). For example: ikanaide (行かないで) → ikanakkō (行かなっこぉ).

=== Conclusive da (だ) ===
Throughout Shizuoka, the conclusive phrase no da (のだ) is contracted to simply da (だ). For example, iku no da (行くのだ variously: go (command), I'm going now (explanatory)) becomes iku da (行くだ) and akai no da (赤いのだ) becomes akai da (赤いだ).

=== Euphonic change of shi (し) → i (い) ===
As far as Shizuoka’s border with Kanagawa Prefecture, there is euphonic change of the s-row mora shi (し) to i (い), such as in dashita (出した) →daita (出いた).

=== Volitional / invitational be (べ), zu/su (ず/す) and kka (っか) ===
Several different particles are used to express volition and invitation across Shizuoka. East of the Fuji River, the particle be (べ) is used, whilst west of the Fuji River (in the central and western parts of the prefecture), the particle zu (ず), as in ikazu (ka) (行かず(か)) is used instead. A similar particle, su (す), is spoken from Higashi-Suruga east of Kannami across the centre and west of Shizuoka. Kka (っか) is found mainly in central regions (Example: ikakka (行かっか)). In the far western city of Kosai, the form -ayo (-あよ) or -aka (-あか) may also be used (For example: ikāyo (行かあよ), ikaaka (行かあか)).

=== Invitational zā (ざあ) and mai (まい) ===
The invitational particle zā (ざあ), such as in ikazā (行かざあ shall we go?), is found in the Central Shizuoka dialect. Additionally, another invitational particle with the same meaning, mai (まい), such as in ikamai (ka) or ikimai (ka)) (行かまい(か) / 行きまい(か), is found predominantly in the west of the prefecture.

=== Conjectural zura (ずら), dara (だら), ra (ら) and tsura (つら) ===
The conjectural particles zura (ずら), dara (だら), ra (ら) and tsura (つら) are used across Shizuoka. The particles ra and zura are used in the same manner as darō (だろう) in standard Japanese, expressing conjecture about something in present or future tense. Although both ra and zura can attach to verbs and adjectives, only zura can attach to nouns. In contrast to ra and zura, tsura is used for expressing conjecture about something in the past (equivalent to -ta darō (-ただろう)). In eastern Shizuoka, be may be used in combination with these particles. Predominantly in the west and centre of the prefecture, the particle zu (ず) can be used to indicate something of high certainty (ikazu (行かず (she's) probably going to go). In recent years, the newer expressions dara (だら) and tara (たら or tadara (ただら) have been increasingly used in place of zura and tsura, respectively. Dara is believed to have originated from an attached ra on the copula, da (だ).

=== Past tense -ke (-け) ===
Until relatively recently in central Shizuoka, the verb and adjective ending -ke (-け) has been commonly used to express the past tense. For example, ikke (行っけ I went) or akakke (赤っけ It was red). Currently, however, -ke is less commonly used, and the form -takke (-たっけ) is more common (Example: ittakke (行ったっけ). Elsewhere, in the former towns of Misakubo and Sakuma, the past tense was expressed with -tsu (-つ) (Example: ittsu (行っつ).

=== Reason and motive ===
The word de (で), which indicates a reason or cause of something (much like kara (から)), is used throughout Shizuoka. It is widely spread across the Tōkai Region, with regional variants including: da (だ) (not to be confused with the copula da) monde (もんで), mondade (もんだで) and (east of Shizuoka City), nte (んて).

=== Adversative conjunctions ===
The adversative conjunction keredo (けれど but) has various forms, including kēga (けぇが) (used in central Shizuoka), kendo (けんど), ken (けん), kega (けが) and ga (が), among others.

=== Imperative form ===
The standard imperative form for Ichidan verbs, [stem form + ro (ろ)], is used in the east of the prefecture, whilst in central and western areas yo (よ) or yoo (よお) is used in the place of ro like in the following: okiro (起きろ wake up (command)) → okiyo / okiyoo.

=== Potential form ===
Shizuoka dialects are so-called ra-nuki kotoba (ら抜き言葉 literally words without 'ra') in reference to the omission of ra (ら) from the verb structure -rareru (-られる), used to indicate the ability to do something (can / to be able to in English). In the west of the prefecture, an additional re (れ) sound may also be added. For example:

- taberarenai (食べられない I can't eat that) → taberenai (食べれない), tabererenai (食べれれない) or taberēnai (食べれぇない).
- okirareru (起きられる to be able to get up) → okireru (起きれる), okirereru (起きれれる) or okirēru (起きれぇる).
