= Hosoe =

Hosoe may refer to:

- Hosoe, Shizuoka, a former town in Shizuoka Prefecture, Japan

== People with the surname ==
- Eikoh Hosoe (細江 英公, born 1933), Japanese photographer
- Shinji Hosoe (細江 慎治, born 1967), Japanese video game composer
