= Inasa District, Shizuoka =

Former district in Shizuoka prefecture, Japan

Inasa District (引佐郡, Inasa-gun) was a rural district located in western Shizuoka, Japan.

As of the end of 2003 (the last data available before its dissolution), the district had an estimated population of 52,485 and a population density of 227.20 persons per km^{2}. Its total area was 231.01 km^{2}.

== History ==
Inasa District was created in the early Meiji cadastral reforms of April 1, 1889, and consisted at the time of two towns (Kito and Kanasashi) and six villages. On April 1, 1896 Aratama District (麁玉郡, Aratama-gun) and Nishi-Hamana Village from Fuchi District (敷知郡, Fuchi-gun) were joined to Inasa District. Nishi-Hamana became a town on May 1, 1922, and was renamed Mikkabi, giving the district three towns and eight villages.

Iitani Village was annexed by Kanasashi, and the town renamed Inasa on April 1, 1953. On April 1, 1955, Kito annexed Nakamura Village and was renamed Hosoe. The remaining villages were consolidated in 1955–1956, with Miyakoda Village going to the city of Hamamatsu, Higahi-Hamada joining Mikkabi Town, Okuyama and Ihei Villages joining with Inasa Town and Aratama Village joining the town of Hamakita in Hamana District.

On July 1, 2005, the towns of Hosoe, Inasa and Mikkabi, along with the cities of Tenryū and Hamakita, the town of Haruno (from Shūchi District), the towns of Misakubo and Sakuma, the village of Tatsuyama (all from Iwata District), and the towns of Maisaka and Yūtō (both from Hamana District), were merged into the expanded city of Hamamatsu. Inasa District was dissolved as a result of this merger.
