= Hamana District, Shizuoka =

Former district in Shizuoka prefecture, Japan

Coordinates: 34.6943°N 137.5598°E

Hamana (浜名郡, Hamana-gun) was a district located in Shizuoka Prefecture, Japan.

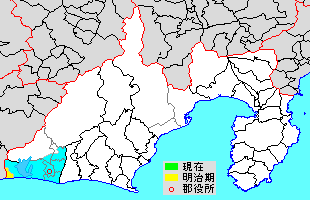
Shizuoka Hamana-gun

At the 2005 Census, the district had an estimated population of 16,938. The total area was 13.47 km^{2}.

- On July 1, 2005, the towns of Maisaka and Yūtō, along with the cities of Tenryū and Hamakita, the town of Haruno (from Shūchi District), the towns of Hosoe, Inasa and Mikkabi (all from Inasa District), the towns of Misakubo and Sakuma, and the village of Tatsuyama (all from Iwata District), were merged into the expanded city of Hamamatsu; this left district with one municipality.
- On March 23, 2010, the town of Arai was merged into the expanded city of Kosai. Hamana District was dissolved as a result of this merger.

== District Timeline ==
- October 1, 1955 – The village of Sekishi was merged into the city of Hamamatsu.
- March 31, 1957 – The villages of Irino and parts of Koto were merged into the city of Hamamatsu.
- October 1, 1960 – The village of Koto was merged into the city of Hamamatsu.
- June 20, 1961 – The village of Shinohara was merged into the city of Hamamatsu.
- July 1, 1963 – The town of Hamakita was elevated to city status. (Main article: City of Hamakita)
- July 1, 1965 – The village of Shonai was merged into the city of Hamamatsu.
- January 1, 1972 – The town of Kosai was elevated to city status. (Main article: City of Kosai)
- May 1, 1991 – The village of Kami was merged into the city of Hamamatsu.
- July 1, 2005 – The towns of Maisaka and Yūtō, along with the cities of Tenryū and Hamakita, the town of Haruno (from Shūchi District), the towns of Hosoe, Inasa and Mikkabi (all from Inasa District), the towns of Misakubo and Sakuma, and the village of Tatsuyama (all from Iwata District), were merged into the expanded city of Hamamatsu.
- March 23, 2010 – The town of Arai was merged into the expanded city of Kosai. Hamana District was dissolved as a result of this merger.
