= Tenryū-ku =

Tenryū 天竜区
- Ward
- Tenryū Ward
- Location of Tenryū-ku in Shizuoka

- Location of Tenryū-ku in Japan
- Coordinates: 35°5′44″N 137°47′49″E
- Country: Japan
- Region: Chūbu
- Prefecture: Shizuoka
- City: Hamamatsu

Area
  - Total: 943.84 km^{2} (364.42 sq mi)

Population (December 1, 2019)
  - Total: 27,264
  - Density: 28.886/km^{2} (74.815/sq mi)
- Time zone: UTC+9 (Japan Standard Time)
- Address: 305 Futamata-cho, Tenryū-ku, Hamamatsu, Shizuoka 431-3392
- Climate: Cfa
- Website: www.city.hamamatsu.shizuoka.jp/ward/tenryuku/index.html

Tenryū-ku (天竜区) is one of the three wards of the city of Hamamatsu, Shizuoka Prefecture, Japan. It is bordered by Kita-ku and Hamakita-ku in Hamamatsu, the cities of Shimada and Iwata and towns of Mori and Kawanehon in Shizuoka, Shishiro, Tōei and Toyone in Aichi Prefecture and Iida and Tenryū in Nagano Prefecture.

Tenryū Ward was established on April 1, 2007. It consists of five former cities, towns and villages, including the former city of Tenryū, and towns of Sakuma, Haruno and Misakubo that had previously merged into Hamamatsu on July 1, 2005.

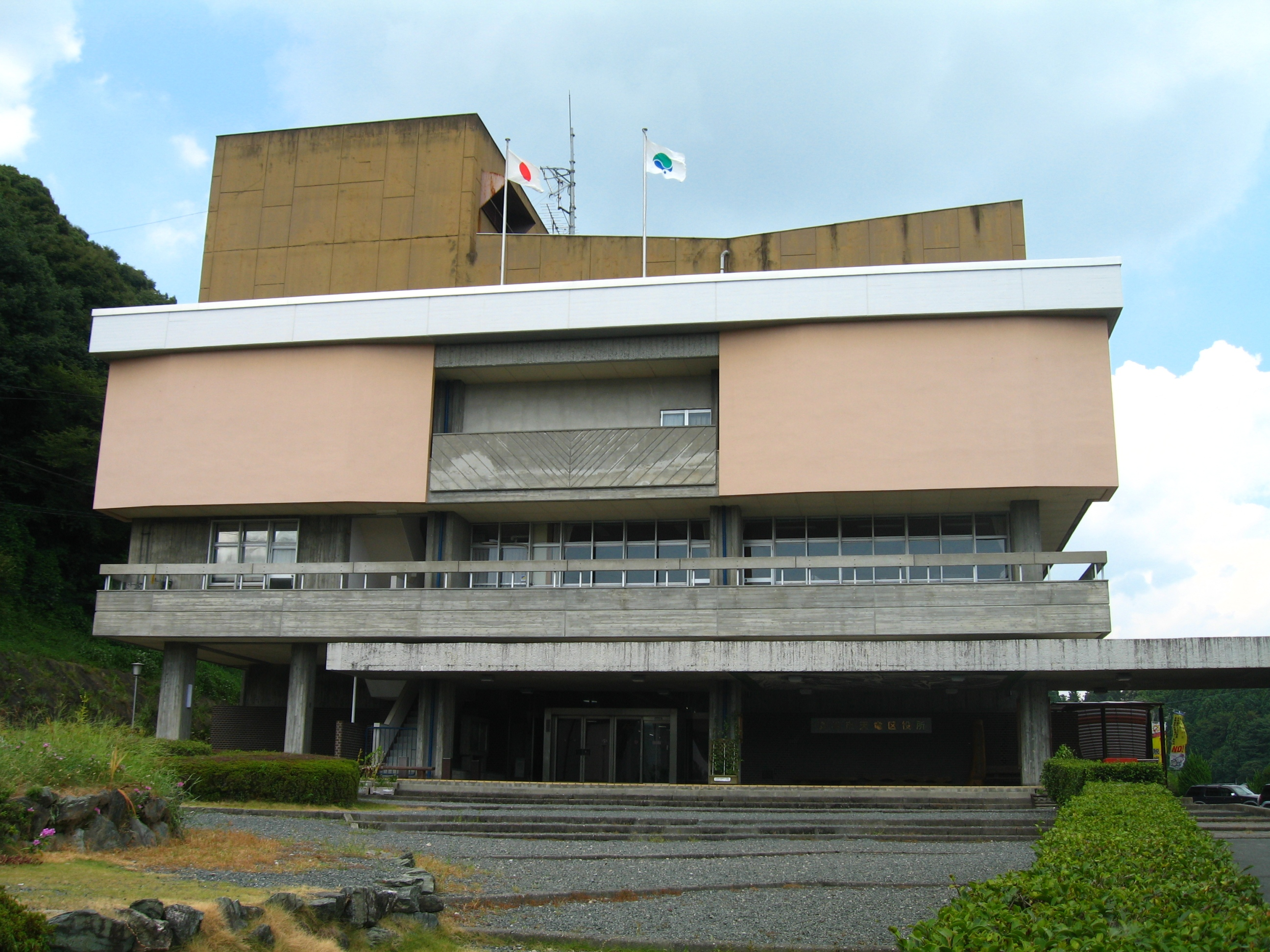
Tenryū Ward Office, Hamamatsu

Tenryū Ward is the largest of Hamamatsu’s seven wards in terms of area. Its population density of 28.9 people per km² is very low. The ward had a population of 34,936 and an area of 944.00 km² in 2009. It's heavily forested, contributing to forestry, which is one of the principal industries of Hamamatsu. There are also many dams on the upper reaches of the Tenryū River, providing hydroelectric power to the Chubu Electric Power Company grid.

Tenryū Ward is served by 13 stations on the Iida Line of the Central Japan Railway Company, 3 stations on the Tenryū Hamanako Railroad Tenryū Hamanako Line and one station on the Enshū Railway Line.

== Geography ==
=== Climate ===
Tenryū Ward has a climate characterized by hot and humid summers, and relatively mild winters (Köppen climate classification Cfa). The average annual temperature in Tenryū is 16.1 °C (61.0 °F). The average annual rainfall is 2,123.4 mm (83.60 in) with July as the wettest month. The temperatures are highest on average in August, at around 27.0 °C (80.6 °F), and lowest in January, at around 5.6 °C (42.1 °F).

Climate data for Tenryū (1991−2020 normals, extremes 1978−present)
Month	Jan	Feb	Mar	Apr	May	Jun	Jul	Aug	Sep	Oct	Nov	Dec	Year
Record high °C (°F)	19.1 (66.4)	24.1 (75.4)	26.0 (78.8)	31.3 (88.3)	33.4 (92.1)	37.7 (99.9)	39.9 (103.8)	40.9 (105.6)	37.8 (100.0)	34.1 (93.4)	27.2 (81.0)	24.6 (76.3)	40.9 (105.6)
Mean daily maximum °C (°F)	10.8 (51.4)	12.0 (53.6)	15.4 (59.7)	20.4 (68.7)	24.6 (76.3)	27.2 (81.0)	31.1 (88.0)	32.7 (90.9)	29.2 (84.6)	24.0 (75.2)	18.6 (65.5)	13.2 (55.8)	21.6 (70.9)
Daily mean °C (°F)	5.6 (42.1)	6.4 (43.5)	9.6 (49.3)	14.4 (57.9)	18.7 (65.7)	22.0 (71.6)	25.8 (78.4)	27.0 (80.6)	23.9 (75.0)	18.7 (65.7)	13.1 (55.6)	7.8 (46.0)	16.1 (61.0)
Mean daily minimum °C (°F)	1.0 (33.8)	1.6 (34.9)	4.5 (40.1)	9.3 (48.7)	13.9 (57.0)	18.1 (64.6)	22.0 (71.6)	23.1 (73.6)	20.2 (68.4)	14.9 (58.8)	8.9 (48.0)	3.3 (37.9)	11.7 (53.1)
Record low °C (°F)	−6.7 (19.9)	−5.9 (21.4)	−5.2 (22.6)	−0.9 (30.4)	5.1 (41.2)	11.3 (52.3)	15.6 (60.1)	17.8 (64.0)	11.4 (52.5)	3.9 (39.0)	−1.8 (28.8)	−5.8 (21.6)	−6.7 (19.9)
Average precipitation mm (inches)	61.5 (2.42)	88.7 (3.49)	176.8 (6.96)	202.7 (7.98)	212.8 (8.38)	258.1 (10.16)	281.0 (11.06)	177.2 (6.98)	276.6 (10.89)	206.6 (8.13)	116.3 (4.58)	65.2 (2.57)	2,123.4 (83.60)
Average precipitation days (≥ 1.0 mm)	5.5	6.2	9.8	9.8	10.9	13.2	13.5	10.7	11.8	10.5	6.9	5.8	114.6
Mean monthly sunshine hours	200.0	186.4	198.4	198.6	192.4	135.4	159.2	204.3	154.9	163.4	176.1	194.2	2,163.4
Source: Japan Meteorological Agency
