= Tatsuyama, Shizuoka =

Tatsuyama 龍山村
- Former municipality
- Flag Seal

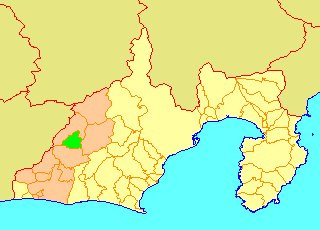
- Location of Tatsuyama in Shizuoka Prefecture
- Country: Japan
- Region: Chūbu (Tōkai)
- Prefecture: Shizuoka Prefecture
- District: Iwata
- Merged: July 1, 2005 (now part of Hamamatsu)

Area
  - Total: 70.23 km^{2} (27.12 sq mi)

Population (June 1, 2005)
  - Total: 1,122
  - Density: 16/km^{2} (41/sq mi)
- Time zone: UTC+09:00 (JST)
- Symbols
- Flower: Rhododendron

Tatsuyama (龍山村, Tatsuyama-mura) was a village located in Iwata District, Shizuoka Prefecture, Japan.

== Population ==
At the time of its merger, the village had an estimated population of 1,123 and a density of 16 persons per km^{2}. The total area was 70.23 km^{2}.

== History ==
On July 1, 2005, Tatsuyama, along with the cities of Tenryū and Hamakita, the town of Haruno (from Shūchi District), the towns of Hosoe, Inasa and Mikkabi (all from Inasa District), the towns of Misakubo and Sakuma (all from Iwata District), and the towns of Maisaka and Yūtō (both from Hamana District), was merged into the expanded city of Hamamatsu.

Prior to the merge, Tatsuyama was the last village within Shizuoka Prefecture. It is now part of Tenryū-ku, Hamamatsu City.
