= Toyodachō Station =

Railway station in Iwata, Shizuoka Prefecture, Japan

CA32 Toyodachō Station 豊田町駅
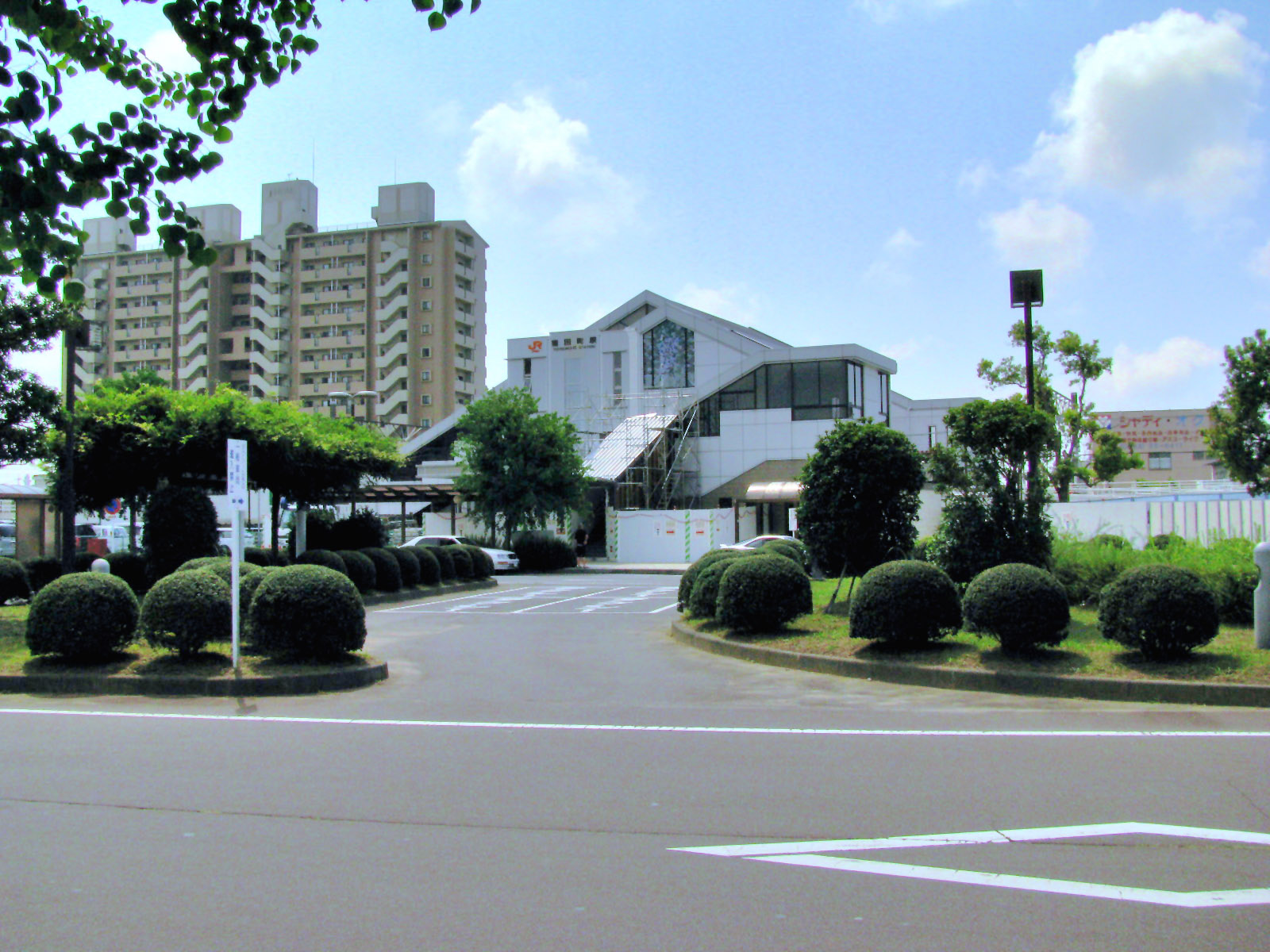
- JR Toyodachō Station in 2008

General information
- Location: 490 Tatsuno, Iwata-shi, Shizuoka-ken; Japan
- Coordinates: 34°42′44″N 137°49′12″E
- Operator: JR Central
- Line: Tokaido Main Line
- Distance: 248.8 kilometers from Tokyo
- Platforms: 2 side platforms

Other information
- Status: Staffed
- Website: Official website

History
- Opened: December 14, 1991

Passengers
- 2023–2024: 5,051 daily
Location
- Location within Shizuoka Prefecture Location within Japan

Toyodachō Station (豊田町駅, Toyodachō-eki) is a railway station in the city of Iwata, Shizuoka Prefecture, Japan, operated by Central Japan Railway Company (JR Tōkai).

== Lines ==
Toyodachō Station is served by the Tōkaidō Main Line, and is located 248.8 kilometers from the starting point of the line at Tokyo Station.

== Station layout ==
The station has two opposing side platforms connected by the station building which is built above the platforms. The station building has automated ticket machines, TOICA automated turnstiles and a staffed ticket office.

=== Platforms ===
1	■ Tōkaidō Main Line	For Kakegawa, Shizuoka
2	■ Tōkaidō Main Line	For Hamamatsu, Toyohashi

== Adjacent stations ==
«	Service	»
Central Japan Railway Company
Tōkaidō Main Line
Home Liner: Does not stop at this station
Iwata	Local	Tenryūgawa

== History ==
Toyodachō Station is a relatively new station on the Tōkaidō Main Line, having been opened on December 14, 1991 in Toyoda town, Shizuoka, prior to its merger with nearby Iwata City in 2005.

Station numbering was introduced to the section of the Tōkaidō Line operated JR Central in March 2018; Toyodachō Station was assigned station number CA32.

== Passenger statistics ==
In fiscal 2017, the station was used by an average of 2,829 passengers daily (boarding passengers only).

== Surrounding area ==
- former Toyoda town hall

== See also ==
- List of railway stations in Japan
