= Yūtō, Shizuoka =

Yūtō 雄踏町
- Former municipality
- Flag Seal

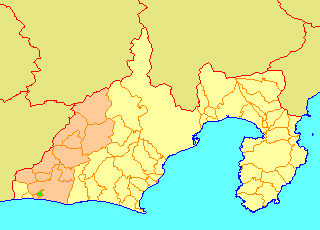
- Location of Yūtō in Shizuoka Prefecture

- Location in Japan
- Coordinates: 34°41′40″N 137°37′50″E
- Country: Japan
- Region: Chūbu (Tōkai)
- Prefecture: Shizuoka Prefecture
- District: Hamana
- Merged: July 1, 2005 (now part of Chūō-ku, Hamamatsu)

Area
  - Total: 8.15 km^{2} (3.15 sq mi)

Population (November 1, 2023)
  - Total: 15,004
  - Density: 1,696/km^{2} (4,390/sq mi)
- Time zone: UTC+09:00 (JST)
- Symbols
- Flower: Rhododendron
- Tree: Maki

Yūtō (雄踏町, Yūtō-chō) was a town located in Hamana District, Shizuoka Prefecture, Japan.

On July 1, 2005, Yūtō, along with the cities of Tenryū and Hamakita, town of Haruno (from Shūchi District), the towns of Hosoe, Inasa and Mikkabi (all from Inasa District), the towns of Misakubo and Sakuma, the village of Tatsuyama (all from Iwata District), and the town of Maisaka (also from Hamana District), was merged into the expanded city of Hamamatsu.

Yūtō was located on the eastern banks of Lake Hamana just north of Maisaka Station on the JR Tōkaidō line.

Prior to its merger with Hamamatsu, Yūtō enjoyed a sister city relationship with Airdrie, Alberta, Canada. This relationship was founded on July 4, 1995.

== Attractions ==
- Hamanako Royal Hotel - http://www.inhamamatsu.com/hotel/hamanako-royal-hotel.php
- "Takiya Ryo" Fishing - https://japan-highlightstravel.com/en/travel/hamamatsu/090047/- A description of this kind of fishing which is done at nighttime with lamps, harpoons, and nets.

== Famous people ==
- Hironoshin Furuhashi (古橋廣之進) - Honorary President of the Japan Swimming Federation
- Iwao Hakamata (袴田巌) - Boxer
- Yoko Kando (漢人陽子) - Barcelona Olympic Team Member
- Shinichirô Sawai (澤井信一郎) - Movie director
