= Inasa, Shizuoka =

Inasa 引佐町
- Former municipality
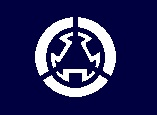
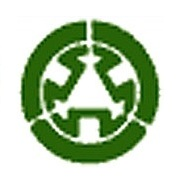
- Flag Emblem

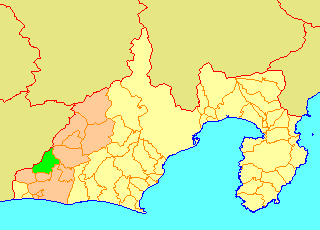
- Location of Inasa in Shizuoka Prefecture

- Location in Japan
- Coordinates: 34°49′07″N 137°40′43″E
- Country: Japan
- Region: Chūbu (Tōkai)
- Prefecture: Shizuoka Prefecture
- District: Inasa
- Merged: July 1, 2005 (now part of Hamana-ku, Hamamatsu)

Area
  - Total: 121.18 km^{2} (46.79 sq mi)

Population (April 1, 2005)
  - Total: 14,481
  - Density: 119.5/km^{2} (310/sq mi)
- Time zone: UTC+09:00 (JST)
- Symbols
- Flower: Azalea
- Tree: Japanese cypress

Inasa (引佐町, Inasa-chō) was a town located in Inasa District, Shizuoka Prefecture, Japan. Inasa became a town on May 1, 1955.

As of April 1, 2005, the town had an estimated population of 14,481 and a density of 119.5 persons per km^{2}. The total area was 121.18 km^{2}.

On July 1, 2005, Inasa, along with the cities of Tenryū and Hamakita, the town of Haruno (from Shūchi District), the towns of Hosoe and Mikkabi (all from Inasa District), the towns of Misakubo and Sakuma, the village of Tatsuyama (all from Iwata District), and the towns of Maisaka and Yūtō (both from Hamana District), was merged into the expanded city of Hamamatsu,

and is now part of Hamana-ku, Hamamatsu City.

== Sister cities ==
Inasa used to be a sister city to Chehalis, Washington, in the United States.
