= Iwata District, Shizuoka =

Former district in Shizuoka prefecture, Japan

Iwata (磐田郡, Iwata-gun) was a district located in Shizuoka Prefecture, Japan.

As of 2003, the district had an estimated population of 109,260 and a density of 171.17 persons per km^{2}. The total area before the dissolution was 638.31 km^{2}.

On July 1, 2005, the towns of Misakubo and Sakuma, and the village of Tatsuyama, along with the cities of Tenryū and Hamakita, the town of Haruno (from Shūchi District), the towns of Hosoe, Inasa and Mikkabi (all from Inasa District), and the towns of Maisaka and Yūtō (both from Hamana District), were merged into the expanded city of Hamamatsu. Iwata District was dissolved as a result of this merger.

== District Timeline ==
- October 1, 1956 - The village of Asaba was elevated to town status.
- September 1, 1957 - The village of Oho was split and merged into the city of Iwata and the town of Toyoda (respectively).
- November 3, 1958:
  - The town of Fukuroi was elevated to city status.
  - The town of Ninomata was elevated to city status and renamed to the city of Tenryū.
- January 1, 1973 - The village of Toyoda was elevated to town status.
- April 1, 2005:
  - The town of Asaba was merged into the expanded city of Fukuroi.
  - The towns of Fukude, Ryūyō and Toyoda, and the village of Toyooka were merged into the expanded city of Iwata.
- July 1, 2005 - The towns of Misakubo and Sakuma, and the village of Tatsuyama, along with the cities of Tenryū and Hamakita, the town of Haruno (from Shūchi District), the towns of Hosoe, Inasa and Mikkabi (all from Inasa District), and the towns of Maisaka and Yūtō (both from Hamana District), were merged into the expanded city of Hamamatsu. Iwata District was dissolved as a result of this merger.
