= Hamakita, Shizuoka =

Hamakita 浜北市
- Former municipality
- Flag Emblem

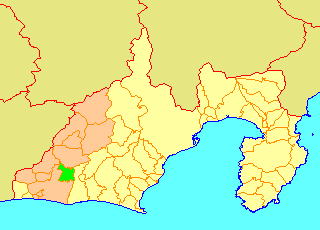
- Location of Hamakita in Shizuoka Prefecture

- Location in Japan
- Coordinates: 34°47′35″N 137°47′24″E
- Country: Japan
- Region: Chūbu (Tōkai)
- Prefecture: Shizuoka Prefecture
- Merged: July 1, 2005 (now part of Hamakita-ku, Hamamatsu)

Area
  - Total: 66.64 km^{2} (25.73 sq mi)

Population (April 1, 2005)
  - Total: 86,653
  - Density: 1,300/km^{2} (3,400/sq mi)
- Time zone: UTC+09:00 (JST)
- Symbols
- Bird: Japanese white-eye
- Flower: Rhododendron
- Tree: Podocarpus macrophyllus

Hamakita (浜北市, Hamakita-shi) was a city located in western Shizuoka Prefecture, Japan.

On April 1, 2005, the city had an estimated population of 86,653 and a density of 1,300.00 persons per km^{2}. The total area was 66.64 km^{2}. It is now part of ward of Hamakita when the city of Hamamatsu became a designated city on April 1, 2007.

On July 1, 2005, Hamakita, along with the city of Tenryū, the town of Haruno (from Shūchi District), the towns of Hosoe, Inasa and Mikkabi (all from Inasa District), the towns of Sakuma and Misakubo, the village of Tatsuyama (all from Iwata District), and the towns of Maisaka and Yūtō (both from Hamana District), was merged into the expanded city of Hamamatsu.

The name "Hamakita" is often mistaken to come from "North of the city of Hamamatsu" (浜松市の北). However, when the town of Hamakita was formed, the town took one letter each from the component villages of Hamana Village and Kitahama Village to form the name "Hamakita".
