= Asaba, Shizuoka =

Asaba 浅羽町
- Former municipality
- Flag Emblem

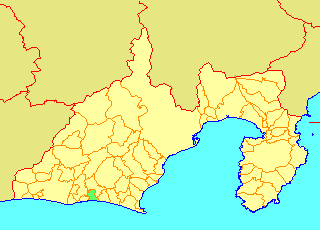
- Location of Asaba in Shizuoka Prefecture

- Location in Japan
- Coordinates: 34.7136°N 137.9241°E
- Country: Japan
- Region: Chūbu (Tōkai)
- Prefecture: Shizuoka Prefecture
- District: Iwata
- Merged: April 1, 2005 (now part of Fukuroi)

Area
  - Total: 28.46 km^{2} (10.99 sq mi)

Population (March 1, 2005)
  - Total: 19,306
  - Density: 678/km^{2} (1,760/sq mi)
- Time zone: UTC+09:00 (JST)
- Symbols
- Bird: Barn swallow
- Flower: Azalea
- Tree: Japanese black pine

Asaba (浅羽町, Asaba-chō) was a town located in Iwata District, Shizuoka Prefecture, Japan.

As of 2005, the town had an estimated population of 19,306 and a density of 678 persons per km^{2}. The total area was 28.46 km^{2}.

Asaba Town was created from Asaba Village in 1956.

On April 1, 2005, Asaba was merged into the expanded city of Fukuroi and thus no longer exists as an independent municipality.
