= Ryūyō, Shizuoka =

Ryūyō 竜洋町
- Former municipality
- Flag Seal

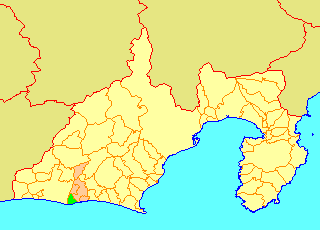
- Location of Ryūyō in Shizuoka Prefecture
- Country: Japan
- Region: Chūbu (Chūbu)
- Prefecture: Shizuoka Prefecture
- District: Iwata
- Merged: April 1, 2005 (now part of Iwata)

Area
  - Total: 23.62 km^{2} (9.12 sq mi)

Population (April 1, 2005)
  - Total: 19,756
  - Density: 836/km^{2} (2,170/sq mi)
- Time zone: UTC+09:00 (JST)
- Symbols
- Flower: Scarlet sage
- Tree: pine

Ryūyō (竜洋町, Ryūyō-chō) was a town located in Iwata District, Shizuoka Prefecture, Japan.

== Population ==
As of March 1, 2005, the town had an estimated population of 19,756 and a density of 836 persons per km^{2}. The total area was 23.62 km^{2}.

== History ==
On April 1, 2005, Ryūyō, along with the towns of Fukude and Toyoda, and the village of Toyooka (all from Iwata District), was merged into the expanded city of Iwata and thus no longer exists as an independent municipality.
