= Sakuma, Shizuoka =

Sakuma 佐久間町
- Former municipality
- Flag Seal

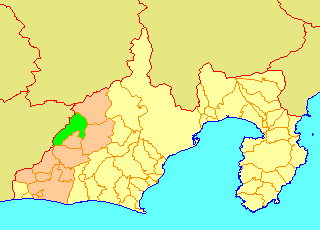
- Location of Sakuma in Shizuoka Prefecture

- Location in Japan
- Coordinates: 35.090452°N 137.80602°E
- Country: Japan
- Region: Chūbu (Tōkai)
- Prefecture: Shizuoka Prefecture
- District: Iwata
- Merged: July 1, 2005 (now part of Hamamatsu)

Area
  - Total: 168.53 km^{2} (65.07 sq mi)

Population (June 1, 2005)
  - Total: 5,394
  - Density: 32/km^{2} (83/sq mi)
- Time zone: UTC+09:00 (JST)
- Symbols
- Bird: Japanese white-eye
- Flower: Azalea
- Tree: Cryptomeria

Sakuma (佐久間町, Sakuma-chō) was a town located in Iwata District, Shizuoka Prefecture, Japan.

At the time of its merger, the town had an estimated population of 5,394 and a density of 32 persons per km^{2}. The total area was 168.53 km^{2}.

On July 1, 2005, Sakuma, along with the cities of Tenryū and Hamakita, the town of Haruno (from Shūchi District), the towns of Hosoe, Inasa and Mikkabi (all from Inasa District), the town of Misakubo, the village of Tatsuyama (all from Iwata District), and the towns of Maisaka and Yūtō (both from Hamana District), was merged into the expanded city of Hamamatsu, and is now part of Tenryū-ku, Hamamatsu City.

Sakuma is the location of the Sakuma Dam, an important hydroelectric power plant, and a frequency converter station that permits exchange of power between Japan's two different power systems. Japan's grids are also connected by two other stations, located at Higashi-Shimizu and Shin Shinano.

== See also ==
- Energy in Japan
