= Fukude, Shizuoka =

Fukude 福田町
- Former municipality
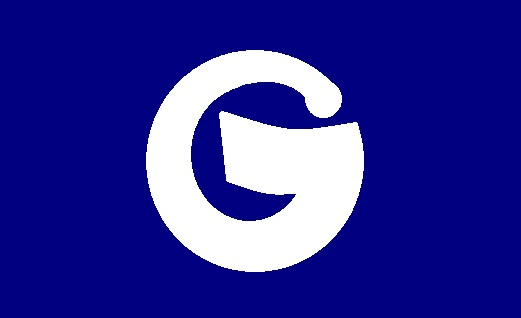
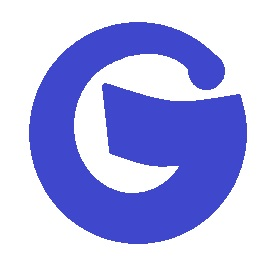
- Flag Emblem

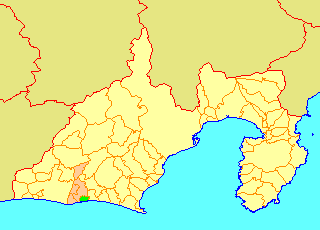
- Location of Fukude in Shizuoka Prefecture

- Location in Japan
- Coordinates: 34.6781°N 137.8797°E
- Country: Japan
- Region: Chūbu (Chūbu)
- Prefecture: Shizuoka Prefecture
- District: Iwata
- Merged: April 1, 2005 (now part of Iwata)

Area
  - Total: 16.59 km^{2} (6.41 sq mi)

Population (April 1, 2005)
  - Total: 19,512
  - Density: 1,177/km^{2} (3,050/sq mi)
- Time zone: UTC+09:00 (JST)
- Symbols
- Flower: Chrysanthemum
- Tree: Pine

Fukude (福田町, Fukude-chō) was a town located in Iwata District, Shizuoka Prefecture, Japan. The town's economy was based on agriculture (raising hothouse melons and green tea) and commercial fishing.

As of March 1, 2005, the town had an estimated population of 19,512 and a density of 1,177 persons per km^{2}. The total area was 16.59 km^{2}.

On April 1, 2005, Fukude, along with the towns of Ryūyō and Toyoda, and the village of Toyooka (all from Iwata District), was merged into the expanded city of Iwata and thus no longer exists as an independent municipality.
