= Mikkabi, Shizuoka =

Mikkabi 三ヶ日町
- Former municipality
- Flag Emblem

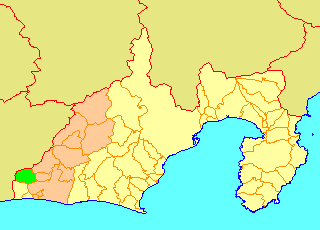
- Location of Mikkabi in Shizuoka Prefecture

- Location in Japan
- Coordinates: 34°48′11″N 137°33′22″E
- Country: Japan
- Region: Chūbu (Tōkai)
- Prefecture: Shizuoka Prefecture
- District: Inasa
- Merged: July 1, 2005 (now part of Hamana-ku, Hamamatsu)

Area
  - Total: 75.65 km^{2} (29.21 sq mi)

Population (June 1, 2005)
  - Total: 16,059
  - Density: 212.28/km^{2} (549.8/sq mi)
- Time zone: UTC+09:00 (JST)
- Symbols
- Bird: Japanese white-eye
- Flower: Citrus unshiu (satsuma)
- Tree: Inumaki

Mikkabi (三ヶ日町, Mikkabi-chō) was a town located in Inasa District, Shizuoka Prefecture, Japan.

At the time of its merger, the town had an estimated population of 16,059 and a density of 212.28 persons per km^{2}. The total area was 75.65 km^{2}.

On July 1, 2005, Mikkabi, along with the cities of Tenryū and Hamakita, the town of Haruno (from Shūchi District), the towns of Hosoe and Inasa (all from Inasa District), the towns of Misakubo and Sakuma, the village of Tatsuyama (all from Iwata District), and the towns of Maisaka and Yūtō (both from Hamana District), was merged into the expanded city of Hamamatsu, and is now part of Hamana-ku, Hamamatsu City.

Mikkabi is known for its production of mikan oranges.
