= Toyoda, Shizuoka =

Toyoda 豊田町
- Former municipality
- Flag Seal

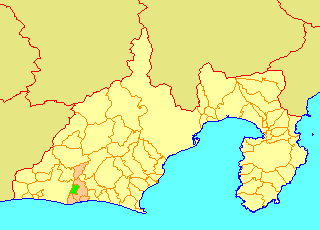
- Location of Toyoda in Shizuoka Prefecture
- Country: Japan
- Region: Chūbu (Chūbu)
- Prefecture: Shizuoka Prefecture
- District: Iwata
- Merged: April 1, 2005 (now part of Iwata)

Area
  - Total: 19.82 km^{2} (7.65 sq mi)

Population (April 1, 2005)
  - Total: 29,591
  - Density: 1,493/km^{2} (3,870/sq mi)
- Time zone: UTC+09:00 (JST)
- Symbols
- Flower: Wisteria
- Tree: Osmanthus

Toyoda (豊田町, Toyoda-chō) was a town located in Iwata District, Shizuoka Prefecture, Japan. Toyoda was founded in 1973.

As of March 1, 2005, the town had an estimated population of 29,591 and a density of 1,493 persons per km^{2}. The total area was 19.82 km^{2}. The town was served by Toyodachō Station on the Tōkaidō Main Line railway.

On April 1, 2005, Toyoda, along with the towns of Fukude and Ryūyō, and the village of Toyooka (all from Iwata District), was merged into the expanded city of Iwata and thus no longer exists as an independent municipality.
