= Maisaka, Shizuoka =

Maisaka 舞阪町
- Former municipality
- Flag Emblem

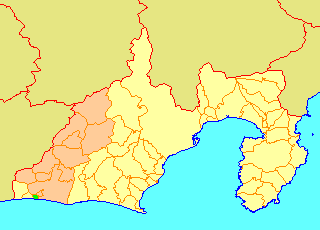
- Location of Maisaka in Shizuoka Prefecture

- Location in Japan
- Coordinates: 34.68567°N 137.62715°E
- Country: Japan
- Region: Chūbu (Tōkai)
- Prefecture: Shizuoka Prefecture
- District: Hamana
- Merged: July 1, 2005 (now part of Chūō-ku, Hamamatsu)

Area
  - Total: 4.63 km^{2} (1.79 sq mi)

Population (June 1, 2005)
  - Total: 11,872
  - Density: 2,564/km^{2} (6,640/sq mi)
- Time zone: UTC+09:00 (JST)
- Symbols
- Flower: Lampranthus
- Tree: Pine

Maisaka (舞阪町, Maisaka-chō) was a town located in Hamana District, Shizuoka Prefecture, Japan.

As of June 1, 2005, the town had an estimated population of 11,872 and a density of 2,564 persons per km^{2}. The total area was 4.63 km^{2}. The town was served by Maisaka Station on the Tōkaidō Main Line railway.

On July 1, 2005, Maisaka, along with the cities of Tenryū and Hamakita, the town of Haruno (from Shūchi District), the towns of Hosoe, Inasa and Mikkabi (all from Inasa District), the towns of Misakubo and Sakuma, the village of Tatsuyama (all from Iwata District), and the town of Yūtō (also from Hamana District), was merged into the expanded city of Hamamatsu, and is now part of Chūō-ku, Hamamatsu City.

Maisaka was a fishing town on the Pacific coast of Shizuoka Prefecture. Settled since prehistoric times (Jōmon period remains have been discovered within the borders of the town. During the Edo period, the town prospered as Maisaka-juku, a post station on the Tōkaidō highway connecting Edo with Kyoto.
