= Misakubo, Shizuoka =

Misakubo 水窪町
- Former municipality
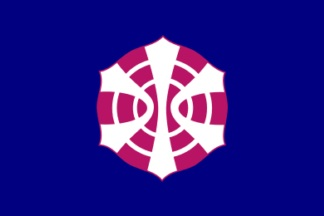
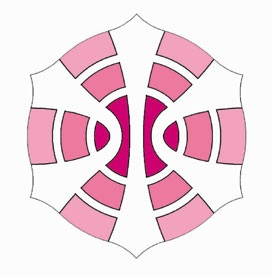
- Flag Emblem

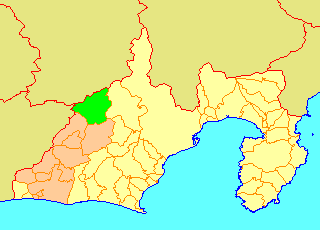
- Location of Misakubo in Shizuoka Prefecture

- Location in Japan
- Coordinates: 35°9′48″N 137°52′8″E
- Country: Japan
- Region: Chūbu (Tōkai)
- Prefecture: Shizuoka Prefecture
- District: Iwata
- Merged: April 1, 2005 (now part of Tenryū-ku, Hamamatsu)

Area
  - Total: 271.28 km^{2} (104.74 sq mi)

Population (April 1, 2005)
  - Total: 3,219
  - Density: 11.86/km^{2} (30.7/sq mi)
- Time zone: UTC+09:00 (JST)
- Symbols
- Bird: Varied tit
- Flower: Gold-banded lily
- Tree: Tochi-no-ki

Misakubo (水窪町, Misakubo-chō) was a town which was located in Iwata District, Shizuoka Prefecture, Japan.

At the time of its merger, the town had an estimated population of 3,219 and a density of 11.86 persons per km^{2}. The total area was 271.28 km^{2}.

On July 1, 2005, Misakubo, along with the cities of Tenryū and Hamakita, the town of Haruno (from Shūchi District), the towns of Hosoe, Inasa and Mikkabi (all from Inasa District), the town of Sakuma, the village of Tatsuyama (all from Iwata District), and the towns of Maisaka and Yūtō (both from Hamana District), was merged into the expanded city of Hamamatsu, and is now part of Tenryū-ku, Hamamatsu City.

Misakubo is located on the Iida-sen (Iida Line) which runs from Toyohashi in Aichi Prefecture to Iida in Nagano Prefecture.

== Festivals ==
=== Misakubo Matsuri (水窪まつり) ===
The most famous festival is the aptly named Misakubo Matsuri (Misakubo Festival) which takes place in mid-September. For more than a month prior to the two-day event the local people gather in area-groups and build a float, make costumes and practice skits. During the day of the festival the floats and performers travel round the town performing for the leaders of each area and the best performances are rewarded. The evenings are a traditional Yatai festival where wooden carved floats are pulled around the town by the revelers.

=== Kuni-Tori Tsunahiki (くにとり綱引き) ===
This is yearly tug-of-war competition between Misakubo, representing Shizuoka Prefecture and Nagano Prefecture. The winning team moves the border of the prefecture by 1 meter, expanding the winning prefecture. In 2006 Misakubo won but is currently 3 meters in the red.
