= Tenryū, Shizuoka =

Tenryū 天竜市
- Former municipality
- Flag Seal

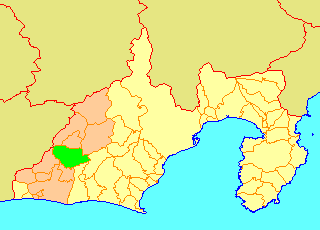
- Location of Tenryū in Shizuoka Prefecture

- Location in Japan
- Coordinates: 34.860659°N 137.813658°E
- Country: Japan
- Region: Chūbu (Tōkai)
- Prefecture: Shizuoka Prefecture
- Merged: July 1, 2005 (now part of Hamamatsu)

Area
  - Total: 181.65 km^{2} (70.14 sq mi)

Population (April 1, 2005)
  - Total: 22,643
  - Density: 124.65/km^{2} (322.8/sq mi)
- Time zone: UTC+09:00 (JST)
- Symbols
- Bird: Grey wagtail
- Flower: Lilium auratum
- Tree: Cryptomeria

Tenryū (天竜市, Tenryū-shi) was a city located in western Shizuoka Prefecture, Japan. Tenryū was founded on November 3, 1958.

== Population ==
On April 1, 2005, the city had an estimated population of 22,643 and a density of 124.65 persons per km^{2}. The total area was 181.65 km^{2}. It is now part of Tenryū-ku when the city of Hamamatsu became a designated city on April 1, 2007.

== History ==
On July 1, 2005, Tenryū, along with the city of Hamakita, the town of Haruno (from Shūchi District, the towns of Hosoe, Inasa and Mikkabi (all from Inasa District), the towns of Sakuma and Misakubo, the village of Tatsuyama (all from Iwata District), and the towns of Maisaka and Yūtō (both from Hamana District), was merged into the expanded city of Hamamatsu.

== Transportation ==
Tenryū was served by two railway lines: Nishi-Kajima Station on the Enshū Railway Line and Tenryū-Futamata Station on the Tenryū Hamanako Railroad Tenryū Hamanako Line.
