= Fukuroi, Shizuoka =

Fukuroi 袋井市
- City
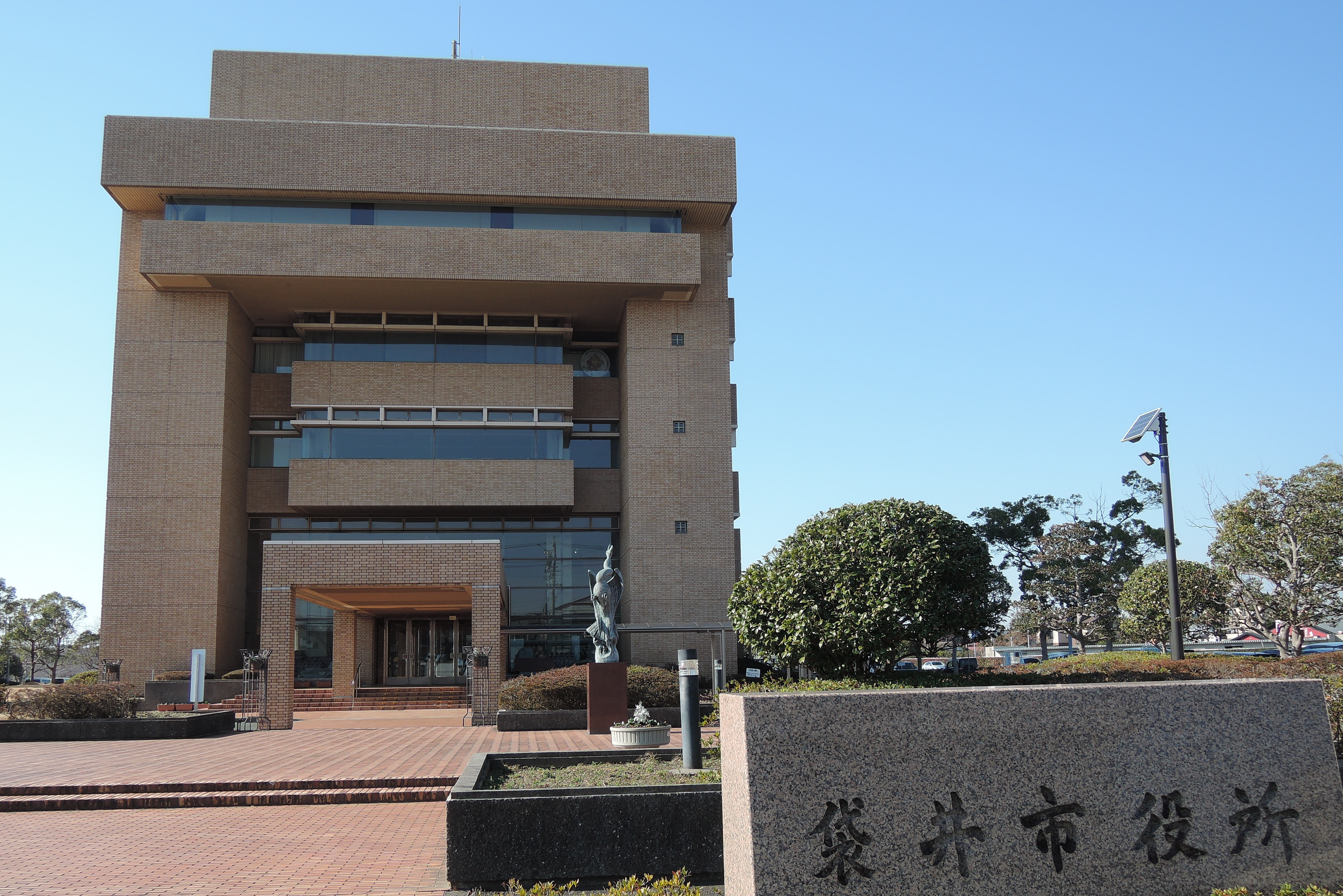
- Fukuroi City hall

- Flag Seal

- Location of Fukuroi in Shizuoka Prefecture

- Coordinates: 34°45′0.6″N 137°55′28.8″E
- Country: Japan
- Region: Chūbu (Tōkai)
- Prefecture: Shizuoka

Government
  - Mayor: OBA Noriyuki (since April 24, 2021)

Area
  - Total: 108.33 km^{2} (41.83 sq mi)

Population (July 2019)
  - Total: 88,395
  - Density: 815.98/km^{2} (2,113.4/sq mi)
- Time zone: UTC+9 (Japan Standard Time)
- Tree: Osmanthus fragrans
- Flower: Cosmos bipinnatus
- Bird: Strix uralensis
- Phone number: 0538-44-3104
- Address: 1-1-1 Niiya, Fukuroi-shi, Shizuoka-ken 437-8666
- Website: Official website

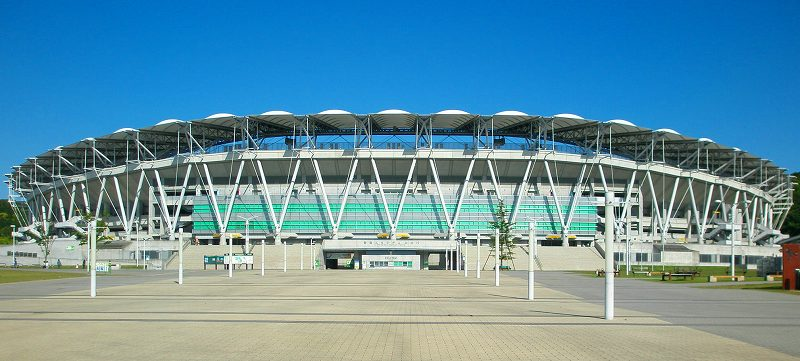
Shizuoka Stadium

Fukuroi (袋井市, Fukuroi-shi) is a city located in Shizuoka Prefecture, Japan. As of 1 July 2019, the city had an estimated population of 88,395 in 34,842 households, and a population density of 820 persons per km^{2}. The total area of the city was 108.33 square kilometres (41.83 sq mi). Fukuroi is a member of the World Health Organization’s Alliance for Healthy Cities (AFHC).

== Geography ==
Fukuroi is on the coastal plain in southwestern Shizuoka Prefecture. It has a small coastline on the Pacific Ocean to the south.

=== Surrounding municipalities ===
Shizuoka Prefecture

- Iwata
- Kakegawa
- Mori

== Demographics ==
Per Japanese census data, the population of Fukuroi has been steadily increasing over the past 50 years.

Historical population
Year	Pop.	±%
1960	48,440	—
1970	48,738	+0.6%
1980	57,926	+18.9%
1990	68,966	+19.1%
2000	78,732	+14.2%
2010	84,831	+7.7%

=== Climate ===
The area has a mild maritime climate with hot, humid summers, and short, cool winters (Köppen climate classification Cfa). The average annual temperature in Fukuroi is 16.3 °C. The average annual rainfall is 2084 mm with September as the wettest month. The temperatures are highest on average in August, at around 27.2 °C, and lowest in January, at around 6.1 °C.

== History ==
During the Sengoku period, Fukuroi was part of the domain within Tōtōmi Province governed by Yamauchi Kazutoyo from Kakegawa Castle. During the Edo period, the area was tenryō territory under direct control of the Tokugawa shogunate. The settlement prospered as Fukuroi-juku on the Tōkaidō highway connecting Edo with Kyoto. After the Meiji Restoration, in with the 1889 establishment of the modern municipalities system, Fukuroi-juku became the town of Yamana within Yamana District, Shizuoka Prefecture. Yamana District was merged into Iwata District in 1896, and the town's name was changed back to Fukuroi in 1909. Fukuroi merged with the neighboring village of Kasai in 1928. It continued to grow in the 1950s, annexing neighboring villages of Kudonishi (from Shuchi District) in 1948, Kudo in 1952, Imai in 1954, Mikawa in 1955, Tahara in 1956, as well as the village of Kasahara from Ogasa District, also in 1956. On November 3, 1958, Fukuroi was elevated to city status. It further expanded through annexation of the town of Yamanashi from Shuchi District in 1963.

During the 2002 FIFA World Cup, as location of (Shizuoka Stadium), Fukuroi played host of some of the events.

On April 1, 2005, the town of Asaba (from Iwata District) was merged into Fukuroi.

== Government ==
Fukuroi has a mayor-council form of government with a directly elected mayor and a unicameral city legislature of 20 members.

== Economy ==
Fukuroi has a mixed economy of agriculture and light industry. The principal crops are green tea and melons. Industry includes food processing, cosmetics, pharmaceutical plants, as well as electronics and automotive components.

== Education ==
- Shizuoka Institute of Science and Technology
- Fukuroi has twelve public elementary schools and four public middle schools operated by the city government and two public high schools operated by the Shizuoka Prefectural Board of Education. In addition, the prefecture also operates a special education school. The city formerly hosted a Brazilian primary school, Escola CONHECER, which is now closed.

== Transportation ==
=== Railway ===
Central Japan Railway Company - Tōkaidō Main Line

- Fukuroi - Aino

=== Highways ===
- Tōmei Expressway
- National Route 1
- National Route 150

== Sister cities ==
- Hillsboro, Oregon, United States, signed on November 3, 1988
- (Japan) Narakawa, Kiso District, Nagano, signed on October 28, 2001 (now the city of Shiojiri)

== Notable people from Fukuroi ==
- Junya Kuno, professional soccer player
- Hakuo Yanagisawa, politician
