= Toyooka, Shizuoka =

Toyooka 豊岡村
- Former municipality
- Flag Seal

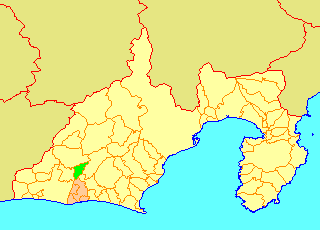
- Location of Toyooka in Shizuoka Prefecture

- Location in Japan
- Coordinates: 34.821963°N 137.847597°E
- Country: Japan
- Region: Chūbu (Chūbu)
- Prefecture: Shizuoka Prefecture
- District: Iwata
- Merged: April 1, 2005 (now part of Iwata)

Area
  - Total: 39.78 km^{2} (15.36 sq mi)

Population (April 1, 2005)
  - Total: 11,306
  - Density: 284/km^{2} (740/sq mi)
- Time zone: UTC+09:00 (JST)
- Symbols
- Flower: Chrysanthemum
- Tree: Narcissus

Toyooka (豊岡村, Toyooka-mura) was a village located in Iwata District, Shizuoka Prefecture, Japan.

As of March 1, 2005, the village had an estimated population of 11,306 and a density of 284 persons per km^{2}. The total area was 39.78 km^{2}.

On April 1, 2005, Toyooka, along with the towns of Fukude, Ryūyō, and Toyoda (all from Iwata District), was merged into the expanded city of Iwata and thus no longer exists as an independent municipality.
