= Hosoe, Shizuoka =

Hosoe 細江町
- Former municipality
- Flag Emblem

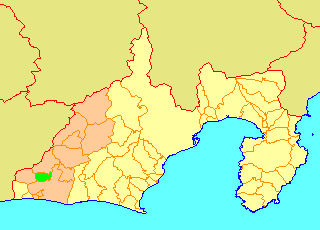
- Location of Hosoe in Shizuoka Prefecture

- Location in Japan
- Coordinates: 34°48′22″N 137°39′4″E
- Country: Japan
- Region: Chūbu (Tōkai)
- Prefecture: Shizuoka Prefecture
- District: Inasa
- Merged: April 1, 2005 (now part of Hamana-ku, Hamamatsu)

Area
  - Total: 34.18 km^{2} (13.20 sq mi)

Population (June 1, 2005)
  - Total: 22,005
  - Density: 643.9/km^{2} (1,668/sq mi)
- Time zone: UTC+09:00 (JST)
- Symbols
- Bird: Indian spot-billed duck
- Flower: Yoshino sakura

Hosoe (細江町, Hosoe-chō) was a town located in Inasa District, Shizuoka Prefecture, Japan. Hosoe was established as a town on April 1, 1955.

As of June 1, 2005, the town had an estimated population of 22,005 and a density of 643.9 persons per km^{2}. The total area was 34.18 km^{2}.

On July 1, 2005, Hosoe, along with the cities of Tenryū and Hamakita, town of Haruno (from Shūchi District), the towns of Inasa and Mikkabi (all from Inasa District), the towns of Misakubo and Sakuma, the village of Tatsuyama (all from Iwata District), and the towns of Maisaka and Yūtō (both from Hamana District), was merged into the expanded city of Hamamatsu, and is now part of Hamana-ku, Hamamatsu City.
