= Haruno, Shizuoka =

Haruno 春野町
- Former municipality
- Flag Emblem

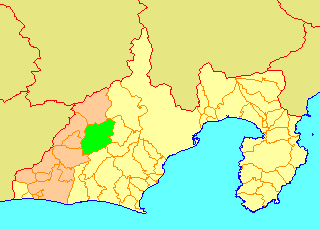
- Location of Haruno in Shizuoka Prefecture

- Location in Japan
- Coordinates: 35.0022°N 137.9063°E
- Country: Japan
- Region: Chūbu (Tōkai)
- Prefecture: Shizuoka Prefecture
- District: Shūchi
- Merged: July 1, 2005 (now part of Tenryū-ku, Hamamatsu)

Area
  - Total: 252.17 km^{2} (97.36 sq mi)

Population (June 1, 2005)
  - Total: 5,953
  - Density: 23.6/km^{2} (61/sq mi)
- Time zone: UTC+09:00 (JST)
- Symbols
- Bird: Japanese bush-warbler
- Flower: Azalea
- Tree: Maple

Haruno (春野町, Haruno-chō) was a town located in Shūchi District, Shizuoka Prefecture, Japan. Haruno was founded as a town on September 30, 1956.

As of June 1, 2005, the town had an estimated population of 5,953 and a density of 23.6 persons per km^{2}. The total area was 252.17 km^{2}. Mount Akiba was located within the town limits.

On July 1, 2005, Haruno, along with the cities of Tenryū and Hamakita, the towns of Hosoe, Inasa and Mikkabi (all from Inasa District), the towns of Misakubo and Sakuma, the village of Tatsuyama (all from Iwata District), and the towns of Maisaka and Yūtō (both from Hamana District), was merged into the expanded city of Hamamatsu, and is now part of Tenryū-ku, Hamamatsu.
