= Arai, Shizuoka =

Arai 新居町
- Former municipality
- Flag Emblem

- Location of Arai in Shizuoka Prefecture

- Location in Japan
- Coordinates: 34°41′N 137°34′E
- Country: Japan
- Region: Chūbu (Tōkai)
- Prefecture: Shizuoka Prefecture
- District: Hamana
- Merged: March 23, 2010 (now part of Kosai)

Area
  - Total: 18.65 km^{2} (7.20 sq mi)

Population (March 31, 2010)
  - Total: 16,975
  - Density: 910/km^{2} (2,400/sq mi)
- Time zone: UTC+09:00 (JST)
- Symbols
- Bird: Barn swallow
- Flower: Azalea
- Tree: Japanese black pine

Arai (新居町, Arai-chō) was a town located in Hamana District, Shizuoka Prefecture, Japan.

As of March 31, 2010, the town had an estimated population of 16,975 and a population density of 910 persons per km^{2}. The total area was 18.65 km^{2}.

On March 23, 2010, Arai was merged into the expanded city of Kosai and thus no longer exists as an independent municipality. Hamana District was dissolved as a result of this merger.

== Geography ==
Arai was located at the southwest end of Shizuoka Prefecture, with part of Lake Hamana located within the town boundaries. The town was on the Enshu Sea of the Pacific Ocean, with a temperate maritime climate with hot, humid summers and mild, cool winters.

== History ==
Arai was located in former Tōtōmi Province, and was largely tenryō territory under direct control of the Tokugawa shogunate in the Edo period, when it was called Arai-juku, and prospered as a post town on the Tōkaidō highway connecting Edo with Kyoto. During the cadastral reform of the early Meiji period in 1889, the area was reorganized into Arai Town within Fuchi District, Shizuoka Prefecture. Fuchi District was merged into Hamana District in 1896.

== Economy ==
The economy of Arai was largely based on commercial fishing, edible seaweed cultivation, and fireworks production.

== Transportation ==
=== Highway ===
- Japan National Route 1
- Japan National Route 42
- Route 301 (Japan)

=== Rail ===
- JR Central – Tōkaidō Main Line
  - Araimachi
