= Iwata, Shizuoka =

Iwata 磐田市
- City
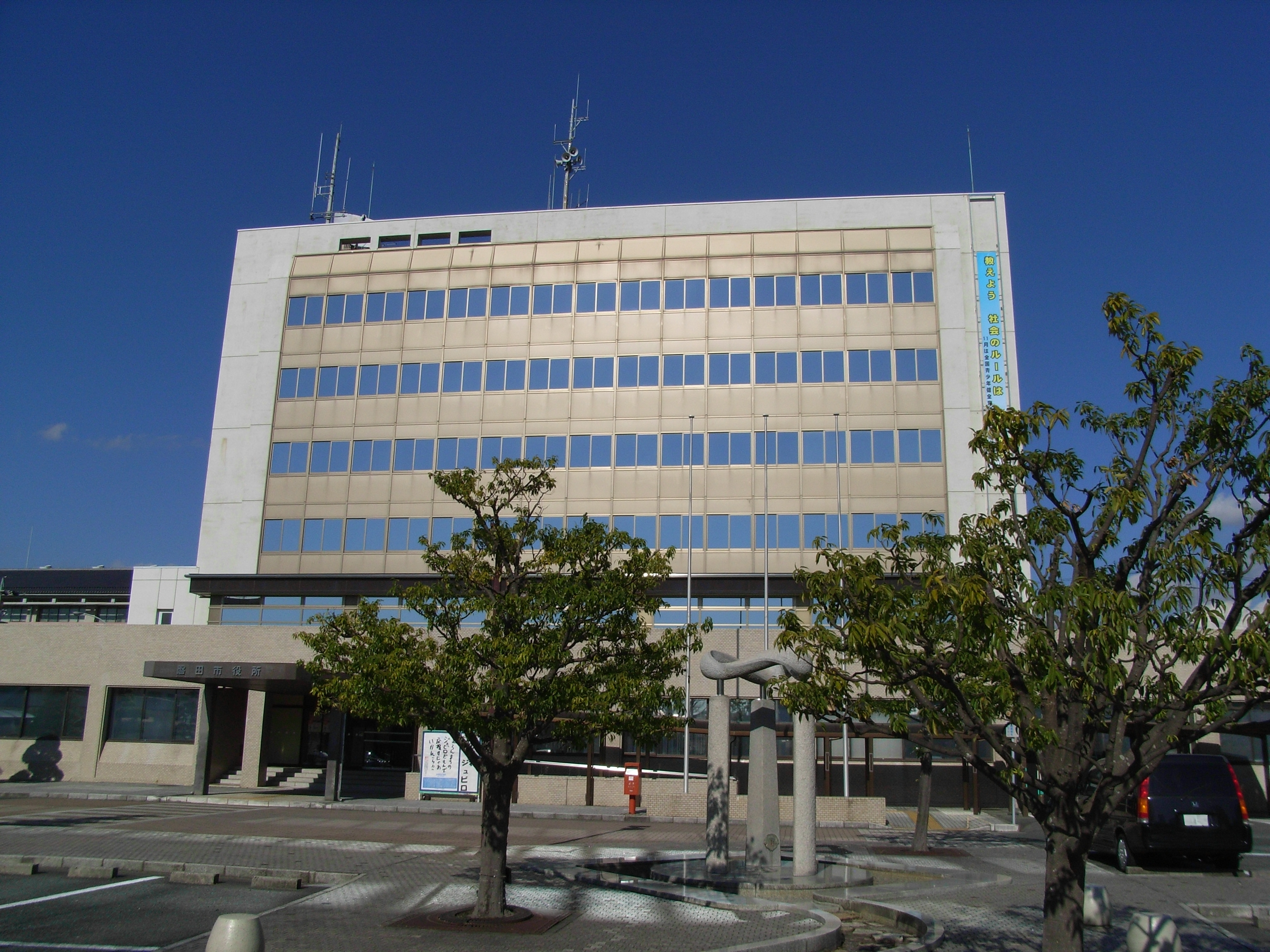
- Iwata City Hall

- Flag Seal
- Interactive map of Iwata
- Coordinates: 34°43′4.4″N 137°51′5.5″E
- Country: Japan
- Region: Chūbu (Tōkai)
- Prefecture: Shizuoka

Government
  - Mayor: Hiroaki Kusachi

Area
  - Total: 163.45 km^{2} (63.11 sq mi)

Population (October 2020)
  - Total: 166,672
  - Density: 1,019.7/km^{2} (2,641.0/sq mi)
- Time zone: UTC+9 (Japan Standard Time)
- Phone number: 0538-37-4827
- Address: 3-1, Kōnodai, Iwata-shi, Shizuoka-ken 438-8650
- Climate: Cfa
- Website: www.city.iwata.shizuoka.jp
- Symbols
- Bird: Blue Rock-thrush
- Flower: Azalea
- Tree: Camphor

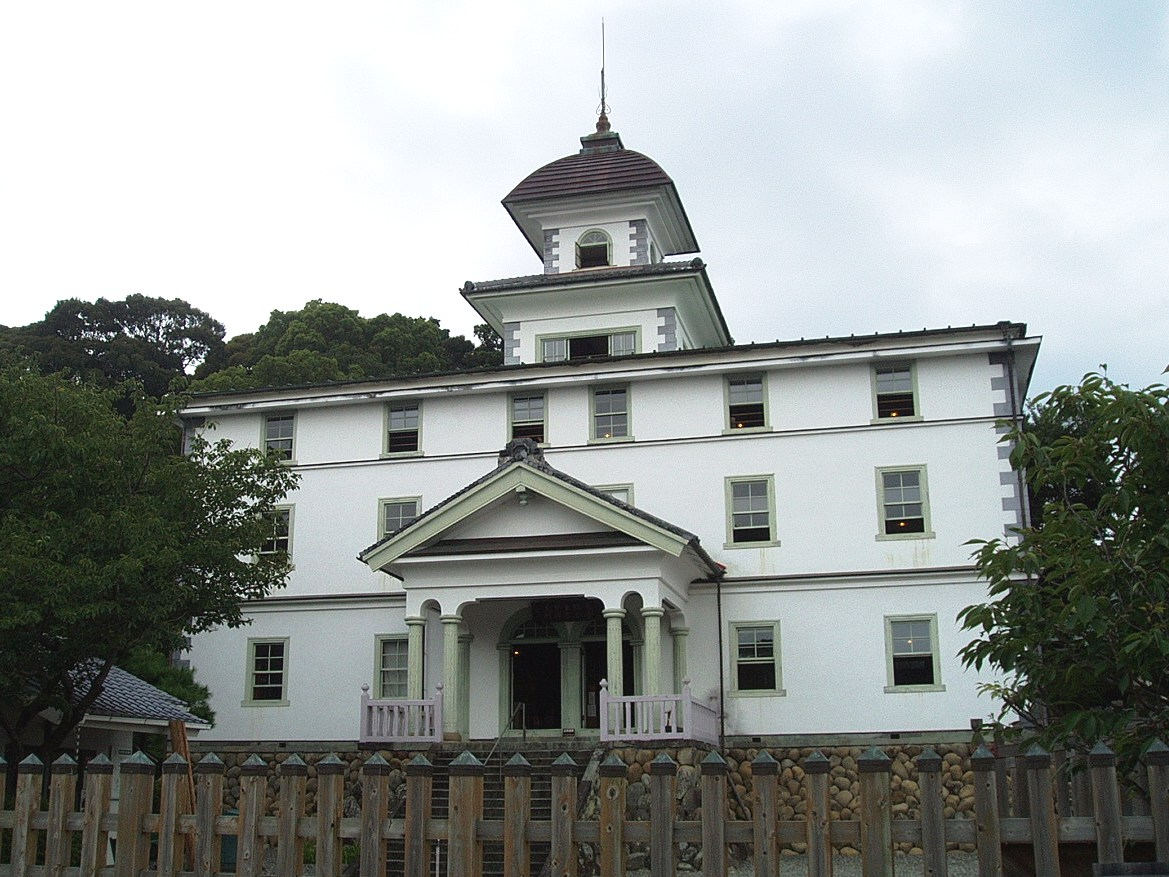
former Mitsuke School in Iwata

Iwata (磐田市, Iwata-shi; Japanese pronunciation: [í.β̞ä̀.tä̀, ì.β̞ä́.tä́.ɕì]) is a city located in Shizuoka Prefecture, Japan. As of 1 May 2019, the city had an estimated population of 169,897 in 68,215 households and a population density was 1,000 persons per km^{2}. The total area of the city was 163.45 square kilometres (63.11 sq mi). Iwata is widely known as the headquarters of the Yamaha Motor Corporation. Iwata is also home to Júbilo Iwata, a J. League soccer team, as well as Yamaha Jubilo, a rugby team.

== Geography ==
Iwata is located in southwestern Shizuoka Prefecture, bordered by the Tenryū River to the west and with a small coastline on the Pacific Ocean to the south.

=== Surrounding municipalities ===
- Shizuoka Prefecture
  - Fukuroi
  - Hamamatsu
  - Mori

=== Demographics ===
Per Japanese census data, the population of Iwata has been increasing over the past 60 years.

Historical population
Year	Pop.	±%
1960	105,489	—
1970	111,452	+5.7%
1980	145,751	+30.8%
1990	157,219	+7.9%
2000	166,002	+5.6%
2010	168,616	+1.6%
2020	166,672	−1.2%

=== Climate ===
The city has a climate characterized by hot and humid summers, and relatively mild winters (Köppen climate classification Cfa). The average annual temperature in Iwata is 16.3 °C (61.3 °F). The average annual rainfall is 1,748.0 mm (68.82 in) with July as the wettest month. The temperatures are highest on average in August, at around 26.8 °C (80.2 °F), and lowest in January, at around 6.2 °C (43.2 °F).

Climate data for Iwata (1991−2020 normals, extremes 1978−present)
Month	Jan	Feb	Mar	Apr	May	Jun	Jul	Aug	Sep	Oct	Nov	Dec	Year
Record high °C (°F)	18.3 (64.9)	22.2 (72.0)	24.3 (75.7)	26.3 (79.3)	30.5 (86.9)	35.9 (96.6)	38.0 (100.4)	39.2 (102.6)	37.2 (99.0)	31.8 (89.2)	26.4 (79.5)	22.8 (73.0)	39.2 (102.6)
Mean daily maximum °C (°F)	10.8 (51.4)	11.7 (53.1)	14.7 (58.5)	19.0 (66.2)	22.7 (72.9)	25.3 (77.5)	28.8 (83.8)	30.6 (87.1)	28.2 (82.8)	23.6 (74.5)	18.5 (65.3)	13.2 (55.8)	20.6 (69.1)
Daily mean °C (°F)	6.2 (43.2)	6.9 (44.4)	10.0 (50.0)	14.5 (58.1)	18.6 (65.5)	21.8 (71.2)	25.4 (77.7)	26.8 (80.2)	24.1 (75.4)	19.1 (66.4)	13.7 (56.7)	8.5 (47.3)	16.3 (61.3)
Mean daily minimum °C (°F)	2.2 (36.0)	2.5 (36.5)	5.3 (41.5)	10.0 (50.0)	14.7 (58.5)	18.8 (65.8)	22.7 (72.9)	23.8 (74.8)	20.7 (69.3)	15.2 (59.4)	9.5 (49.1)	4.4 (39.9)	12.5 (54.5)
Record low °C (°F)	−4.2 (24.4)	−4.8 (23.4)	−2.5 (27.5)	1.9 (35.4)	5.9 (42.6)	12.3 (54.1)	16.6 (61.9)	17.5 (63.5)	11.4 (52.5)	5.1 (41.2)	0.2 (32.4)	−3.9 (25.0)	−4.8 (23.4)
Average precipitation mm (inches)	52.0 (2.05)	74.7 (2.94)	133.9 (5.27)	158.7 (6.25)	170.3 (6.70)	222.0 (8.74)	195.9 (7.71)	124.6 (4.91)	217.6 (8.57)	195.0 (7.68)	106.0 (4.17)	59.0 (2.32)	1,748 (68.82)
Average precipitation days (≥ 1.0 mm)	5.4	6.2	9.6	9.7	9.8	12.3	10.4	7.4	11.3	10.2	7.5	5.7	105.5
Mean monthly sunshine hours	197.4	187.6	195.5	200.3	203.4	147.8	182.3	238.0	168.8	162.2	170.6	188.9	2,242.9
Source: Japan Meteorological Agency

== History ==
Iwata is an ancient settlement, and human habitation dates from the Japanese Paleolithic period, with obsidian tools and shell middens having been found. Numerous kofun burial mounds are also found in the area of the city, which came under the control of the imperial dynasty around the time of the semi-legendary Emperor Seimu. The Nara period provincial capital and provincial temple of Tōtōmi Province were located in Iwata. During the Edo period, it developed as a post station on the Tokaidō highway connecting Edo with Kyoto and contained Mitsuke-juku, one of the 53 stations on the road.

With the establishment of the modern municipalities system of the early Meiji period on October 1, 1889, Mitsuke Town within Iwata District, Shizuoka was established. Later that year, Nakaizumi Town and Ninomiya Village merged to form Nakaizumi Town. These two towns merged on November 1, 1940 with Saikai Village and Tenryū Village to form the new town of Iwata. Iwata was raised to city status on April 1, 1948.

On April 1, 2005, the neighboring towns of Fukude, Ryūyō and Toyoda, and the village of Toyooka (all from Iwata District) were merged into Iwata.

== Government ==
Iwata has a mayor-council form of government with a directly elected mayor and a unicameral city legislature of 26 members. The city contributes three members to the Shizuoka Prefectural Assembly.

== Economy ==
The economy of Iwata is primarily agricultural and is known for green tea and melons grown in greenhouses, which are called "Iwata melon". The Yamaha Corporation was founded in Iwata and maintains a strong presence in the city. Yamaha Motor's headquarters is in Iwata. Suzuki Motor Corporation has a vehicle assembly plant in Iwata.

== Education ==
Shizuoka Sangyo University, a private university, is located in Iwata.

Shizuoka Professional University Junior College of Agriculture a public professional Junior college, is located in Iwata since 2020.

Iwata has 23 public elementary schools and 11 public middle schools operated by the city government. The city has four public high schools operated by the Shizuoka Prefectural Board of Education. The prefecture also operates two special education schools for the disabled.

Iwata also has two international schools, the CEP Brasil – Centro Educacional e Profissional – Brazilian school and the Escola Objetivo de Iwata Tia Rosa, a Brazilian primary school Iwata formerly hosted another Brazilian school, a primary school called Escola Nipo-Brasileira de Iwata.

== Transportation ==
=== Railway ===
- Central Japan Railway Company - Tōkaidō Main Line
  - Iwata – Toyodachō
- Tenryū Hamanako Railroad Tenryū Hamanako Line
  - Shikiji – Toyooka – Kaminobe

=== Highway ===
- Tōmei Expressway
- National Route 150

== Sister cities ==
- Dagupan, Philippines, since February 19, 1975
- Mountain View, California, United States, since June 4, 1976

== Local attractions ==
=== National Historic Sites ===
- Chōshizuka Kofun
- Former Mitsuke School
- Mikuriyama Kofun group
- Shinpōinyama Kofun group
- Tōtōmi Kokubun-ji

=== Other ===
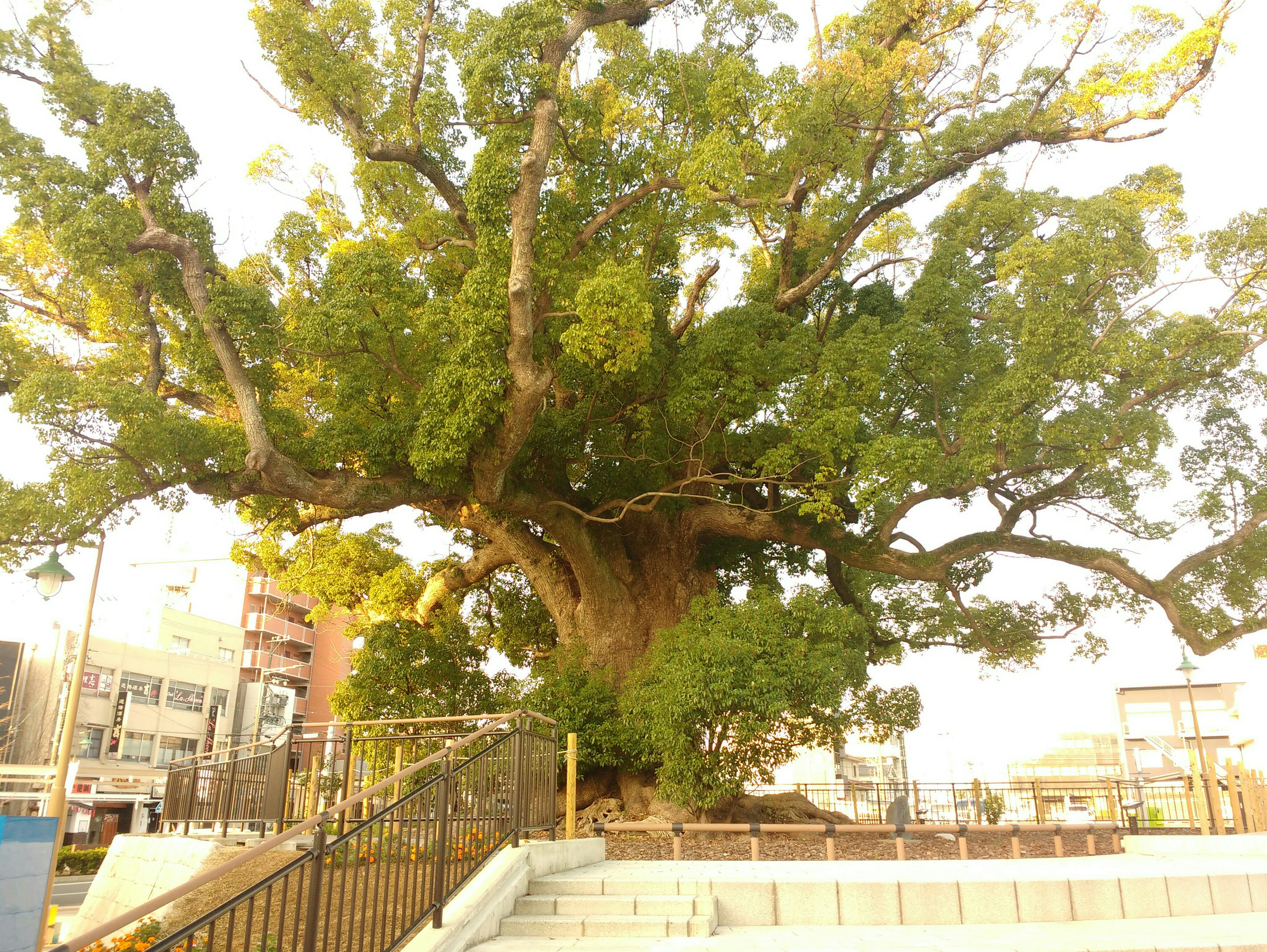
The Great Camphor tree of Zendoji situated on north exit of Iwata Station

Near the north exit of JR Iwata Station is the Great Camphor tree of Zendo-ji. Believed to be 700 years old, it was once within the grounds of a Buddhist temple called Zendo-ji. Its height is 18.3 meters and its diameter at chest height is 2.87 meters. The root structure bulges out of the ground creating a second level, and the circumference at the portion touching the surface is 32.9 meters.

The upper and lower shrines of Shinto Shusei, a Confucian Shinto sect founded in 1849 by Nitta Kuniteru, are located in Iwata.

== Notable people from Iwata ==
- Saori Atsumi – singer-songwriter
- Shuji Ishikawa - professional wrestler
- Mima Ito – professional table-tennis player
- Noriko Mizoguchi – judoka
- Jun Mizutani – professional table-tennis player
- Masami Nagasawa – actress
- Ryosuke Sasagaki – professional soccer player
