= Shūchi District, Shizuoka =

District in Shizuoka Prefecture, Japan

Coordinates: 34°50′00″N 137°56′00″E

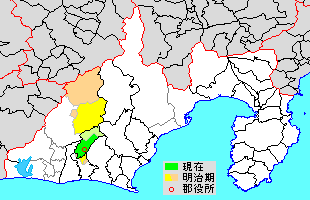
Map of Shūchi District in Shizuoka Prefecture

Shūchi District (周智郡, Shūchi-gun) is a rural district located in Shizuoka Prefecture, Japan. As of July 2012, the district has an estimated population of 19,177 and a population density of 143 persons per km^{2}. The total area was 133.84 km^{2}.

== Towns and villages ==
With the merger of the town of Haruno into the city of Hamamatsu on July 1, 2005, the district is now contiguous only with Mori Town.

- Mori

== History ==
Shūchi District was established in the July 22, 1878 cadastral reforms initiated by the Meiji government with one town (Mori) and 53 villages. In a round of consolidation on April 1, 1889, the number of villages was reduced to 12. The village of Yamanashi was elevated to town status on March 13, 1898 and the village of Okuyama became the town of Mizukubo on May 10, 1925. The village of Inui was elevated to town status on November 15, 1928. On September 1, 1948, the village of Kudonishi was transferred to the town of Fukuroi in Iwata District, as were Mizukubo and village of Shironishi on July 1, 1951. In another round of consolidation from 1955 to 1956, the town of Haruno wa created by the merger of Inui with the villages of Kumakiri and Keta, and the remaining villages were consolidated with Mori or Yamanashi. Yamanashi was merged into Fukuroi on January 1, 1963 and Haruno with Hamamatsu on July 1, 2005.
