= Otake =

Otake may refer to:

- Ōtake, Hiroshima, a city in Hiroshima Prefecture, Japan
- Ōtake (surname), a Japanese surname
- Otake (Nakanoshima), a volcano on Nakanoshima in Kagoshima Prefecture, Japan
- Otake Dainichi Nyorai, a divine being in Japanese Buddhism
- Ōtake stable, a professional sumo stable
- Dairyū Tadahiro, head coach of Ōtake stable

== See also ==
- Ontake (disambiguation)
