= List of cities in Shizuoka Prefecture by population =

The following list sorts all cities (including towns and villages) in the Japanese prefecture of Shizuoka with a population of more than 10,000 according to the 2020 Census. As of October 1, 2020, 30 places fulfill this criterion and are listed here. This list refers only to the population of individual cities, towns and villages within their defined limits, which does not include other municipalities or suburban areas within urban agglomerations.

== List ==
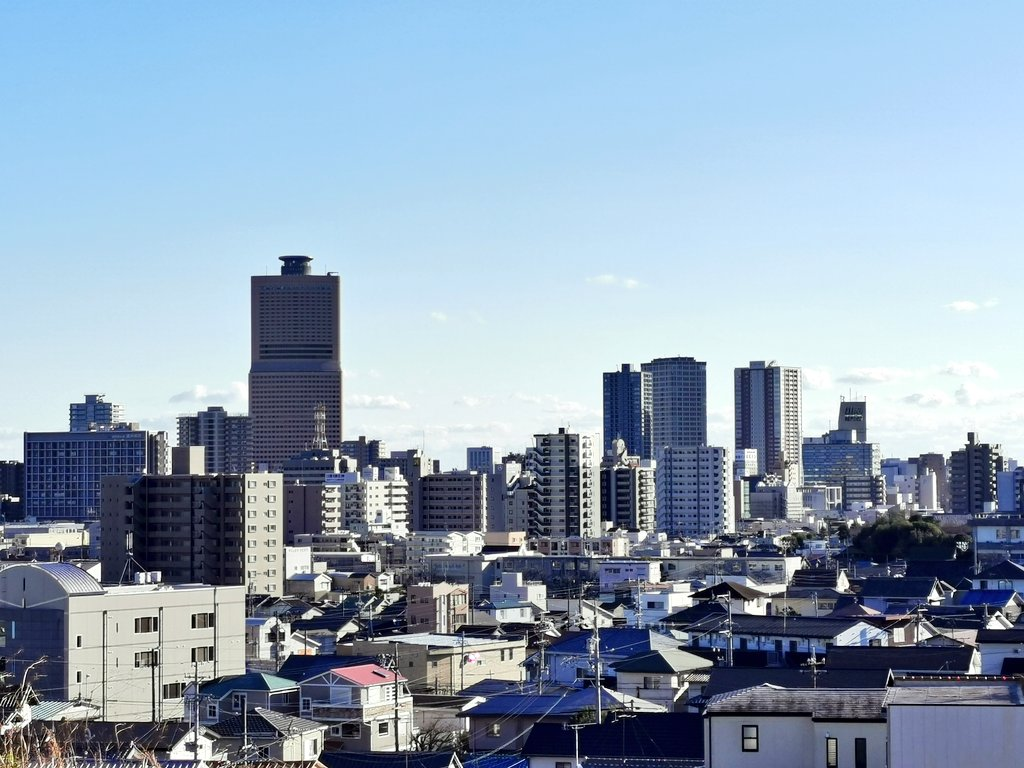
01.Hamamatsu

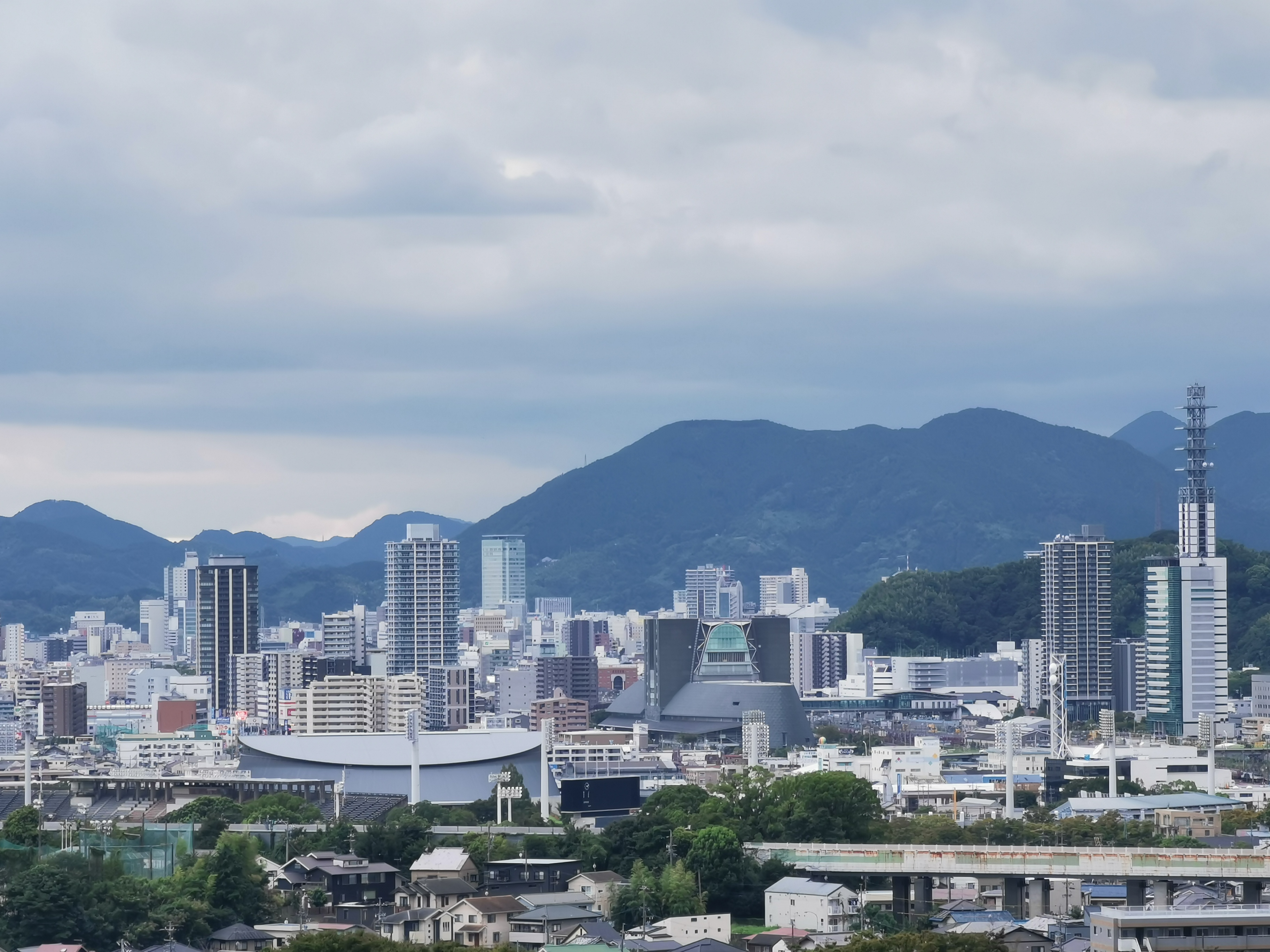
02.Shizuoka

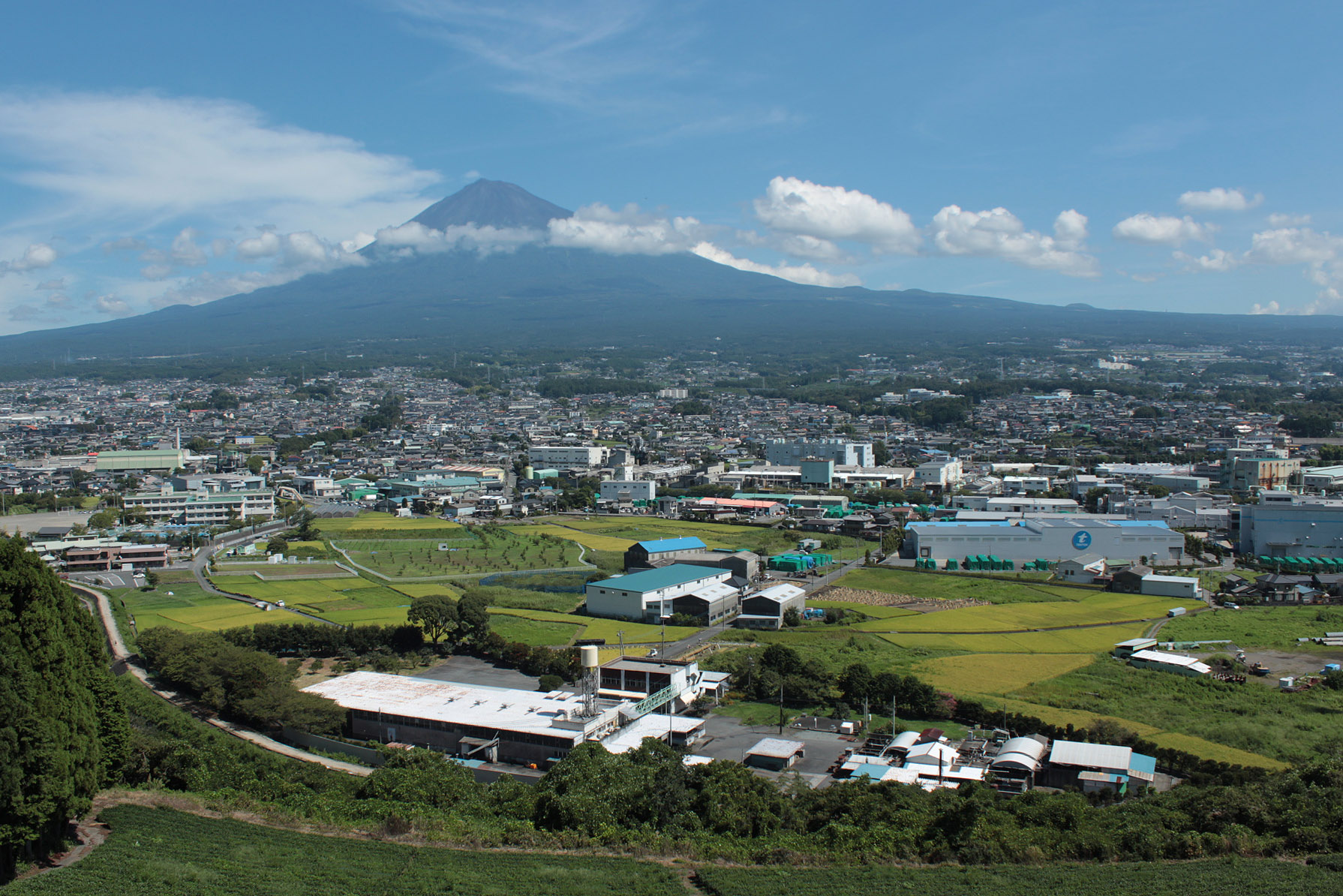
03.Fuji

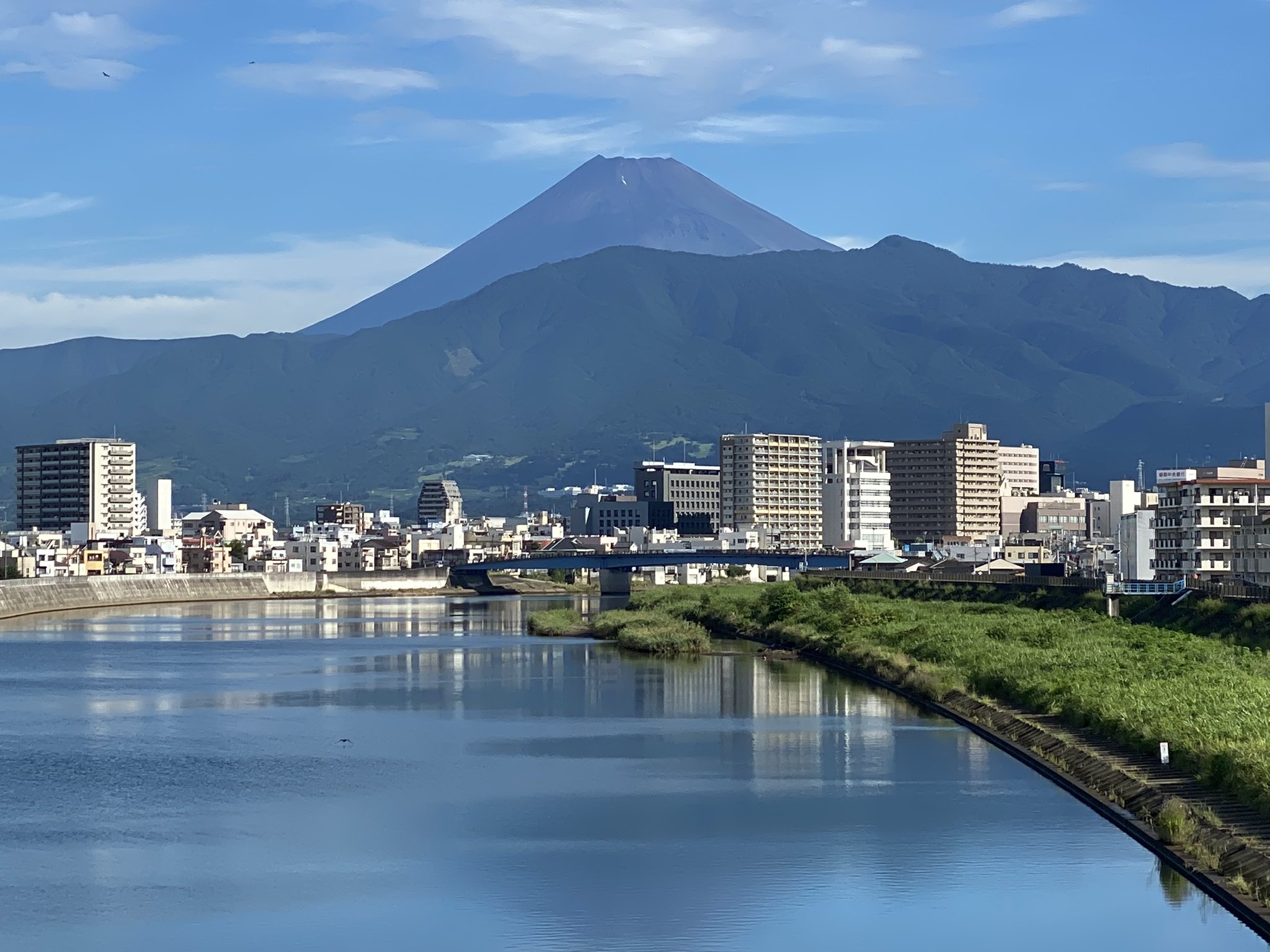
04.Numazu

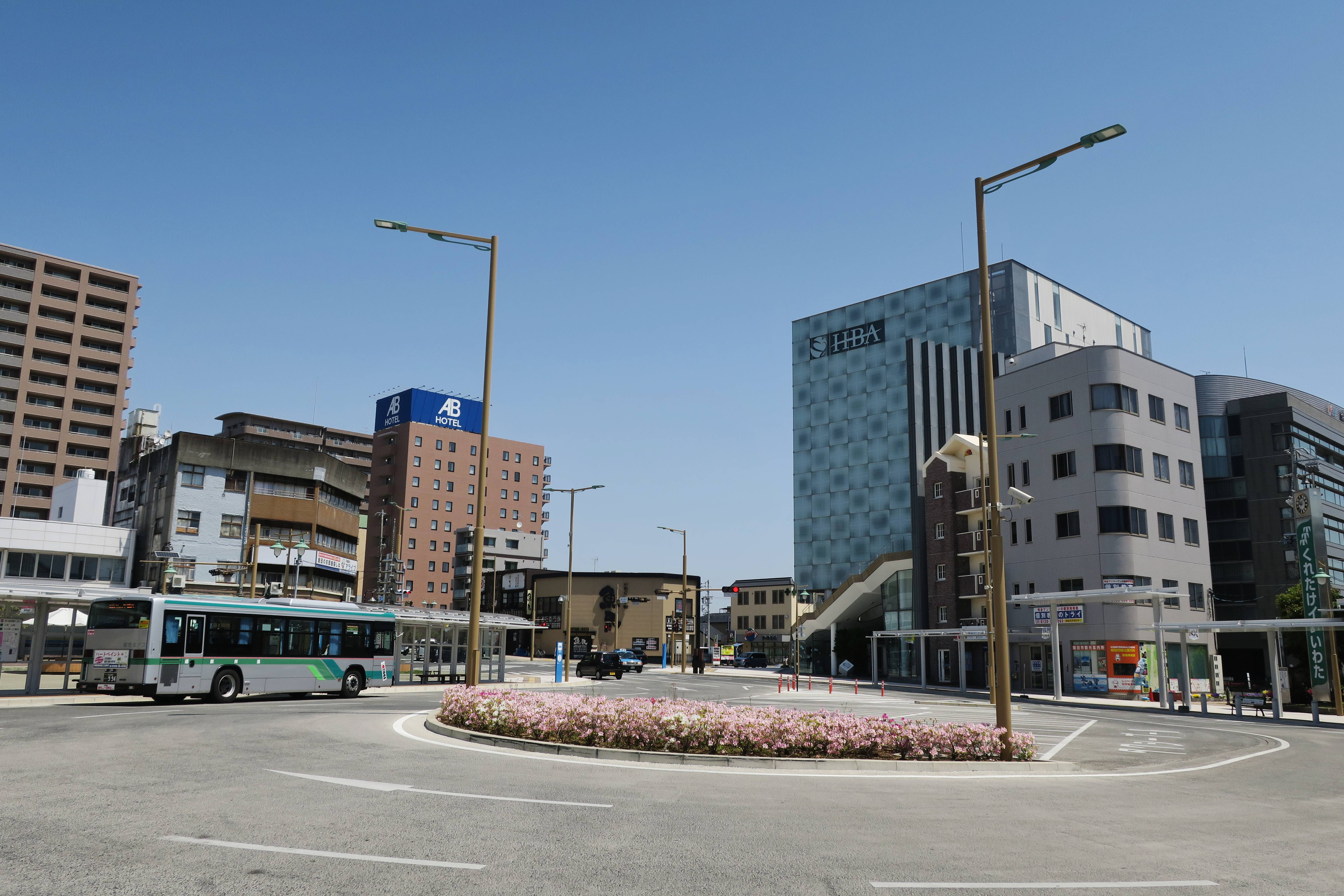
05.Iwata

The following table lists the 30 cities, villages and towns in Shizuoka with a population of at least 10,000 on October 1, 2020, according to the 2020 Census. The table also gives an overview of the evolution of the population since the 1995 census.

Rank (2020)	Name	Status	2020	2015	2010	2005	2000	1995
1	Hamamatsu	City	791,155	797,980	800,866	804,032	786,306	766,832
2	Shizuoka	City	693,759	704,989	716,197	723,323	729,980	738,674
3	Fuji	City	245,489	248,399	254,027	253,297	251,559	246,985
4	Numazu	City	189,611	195,633	202,304	208,005	211,559	216,470
5	Iwata	City	166,744	167,210	168,625	170,899	166,002	162,667
6	Fujieda	City	141,385	143,605	142,151	141,944	141,643	138,388
7	Yaizu	City	136,891	139,462	143,249	143,101	141,452	139,083
8	Fujinomiya	City	128,147	130,770	132,001	131,476	130,372	129,999
9	Kakegawa	City	114,989	114,602	116,363	117,857	114,328	109,978
10	Mishima	City	107,851	110,046	111,838	112,241	110,519	107,890
11	Shimada	City	95,759	98,112	100,276	102,108	102,585	103,490
12	Fukuroi	City	87,882	85,789	84,846	82,991	78,732	74,826
13	Gotemba	City	86,689	88,078	89,030	85,976	82,533	81,803
14	Itō	City	65,529	68,345	71,437	72,441	71,720	72,287
15	Kosai	City	57,907	59,789	60,107	60,994	60,827	60,714
16	Susono	City	50,945	52,737	54,546	53,062	52,682	49,729
17	Kikugawa	City	47,823	46,763	47,041	47,502	47,036	46,334
18	Izunokuni	City	46,820	48,152	49,269	50,011	50,062	50,328
19	Makinohara	City	43,524	45,547	49,019	50,645	51,672	52,067
20	Nagaizumi	Town	43,365	42,331	40,763	38,716	36,169	34,208
21	Kannami	Town	36,802	37,661	38,571	38,803	38,611	37,375
22	Atami	City	34,233	37,544	39,611	41,202	42,936	45,610
23	Shimizu	Town	31,720	32,118	32,302	31,961	30,870	29,518
24	Omaezaki	City	31,117	32,578	34,700	35,272	36,059	35,316
25	Yoshida	Town	28,937	29,093	29,815	28,648	27,492	26,475
26	Izu	City	28,264	31,317	34,202	36,627	38,581	39,426
27	Shimoda	City	20,195	22,916	25,013	26,557	27,798	29,103
28	Oyama	Town	18,585	19,497	20,629	21,478	22,235	22,780
29	Mori	Town	17,475	18,528	19,435	20,273	20,689	21,321
30	Higashiizu	Town	11,487	12,624	14,064	15,165	15,807	16,741
