= Wadaoka Kofun group =

Archaeological site in the Tōkai region of Japan

- 和田岡古墳群 (Japanese)
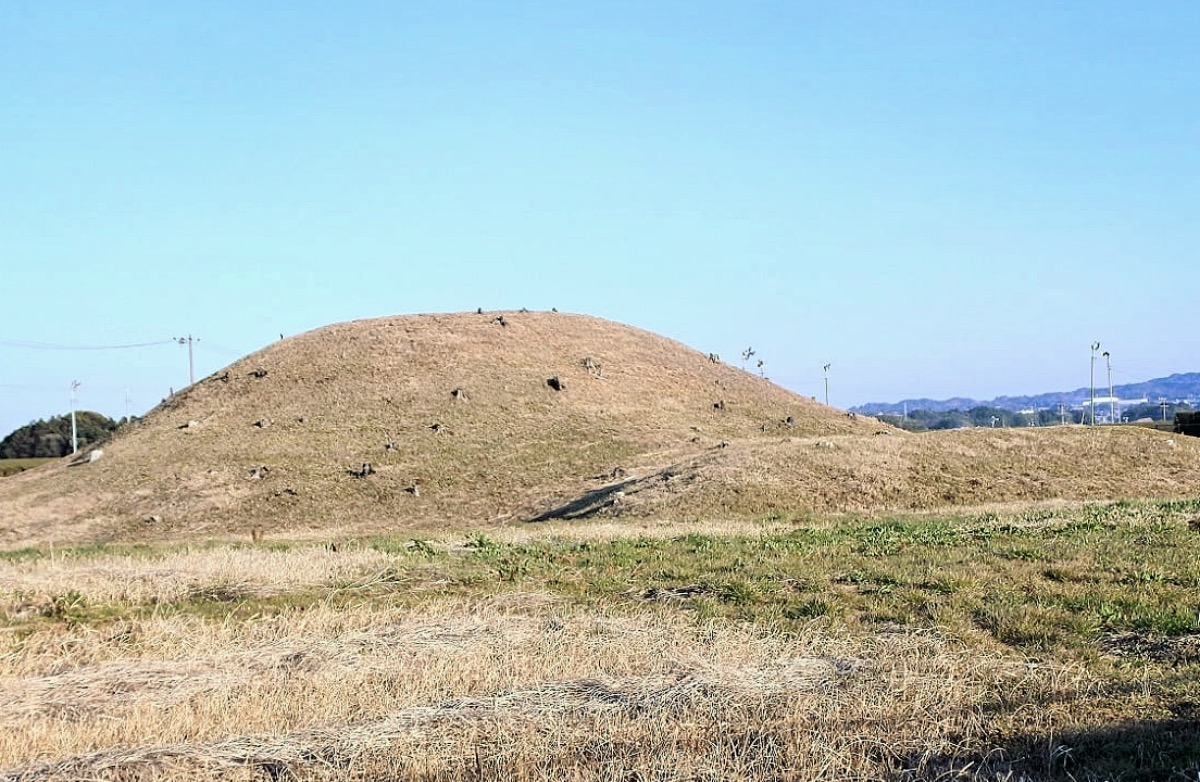
- Yoshioka-Otsuka Kofun before renovation

- Wadaoka Kofun Wadaoka Kofun group (Japan)
- 34°46′40″N 137°57′06″E
- Type: kofun
- Periods: Kofun period
- Location: Kakegawa, Shizuoka, Japan
- Region: Tōkai region

History
- Built: 5th to 6th century AD

Site notes
- Public access: Yes

The Wadaoka Kofun group (和田岡古墳群, Wadaoka kofun-gun) is an archaeological site with a cluster of burial mounds from the Kofun period located in what is now part of the city of Kakegawa, Shizuoka in the Tōkai region of Japan. The site was designated a National Historic Site of Japan in 1996.

== Overview ==
The Wadaoka Kofun group is located in an area measuring approximately 2.5 kilometers north-south by one kilometer east-west, on a low plateau overlooking the Haranoya River west of the downtown area of modern Kakegawa city. The site consists of four keyhole-shaped kofun (zenpō-kōen-fun (前方後円墳)), 15 circular-shaped kofun (empun (円墳)), and four square-shaped kofun (hōfun (方墳)), all dating from the 5th century to the sixth century AD. The largest include:

Wadaoka Kofun group
Name	Type	Length
Wakanezuka Kofun 各和金塚古墳	keyhole	66.4 meters Anterior: 20.5 m wide x 4 m high: Posterior 51.2 m diameter x 6.5 m high
Hisagozuka Kofun 瓢塚古墳	keyhole	63 meters long Anterior: 25.2 m wide x 3.5 m high: Posterior 37.8 m diameter x 3.5 m high
Yoshioka-Otsuka Kofun 吉岡大塚古墳	keyhole	55 meters long Anterior: 27.5 m wide x 2.5 m high: Posterior 41.3 m diameter x 7.2 m high
Gyojinzuka Kofun 行人塚古墳	keyhole	43.7 meters long Anterior: 16 m wide: Posterior 25.4 m diameter
Harubayashiin Kofun 春林院古墳	circular	35 meters, height 5 meters
Usa-Hachiman-sha Kofun	circular	30 meter diameter
Gongenyama Kofun	circular	40 meter diameter
Ishinogata Kofun	circular	25 meter diameter

These tumuli are believed to be the tombs of local kings who ruled the Haranodani River basin. The Wakanezuka Kofun is considered the oldest, but its pit-type burial chamber was robbed in 1974 before a proper archaeological excavation could be made. Many of the tumuli were once covered in fukiishi and had haniwa clay figurines, and the Yoshioka-Otsuka Kofun has traces of a moat remaining. Grave goods recovered from the tombs included, large numbers of iron weapons, fragments of armor, pottery shards and shinju-kyo bronze mirrors.

The necropolis is located approximately 15 minutes on foot from the Tenryu Hamanako Line's Hosoya Station. There are plans to make an archaeological park in the area.

== See also ==
- List of Historic Sites of Japan (Shizuoka)
