= Yoshinobu Ishikawa =

Japanese politician (born 1940)

- 石川 嘉延
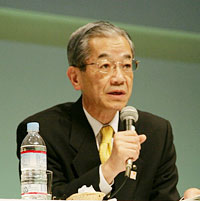
- Ishikawa in 2007

Governor of Shizuoka Prefecture
- In office 3 August 1993 – 17 June 2009
- Monarch: Akihito
- Preceded by: Shigeyoshi Saitō
- Succeeded by: Heita Kawakatsu

Personal details
- Born: November 24, 1940 (age 85) Kakegawa, Shizuoka, Japan
- Party: Independent
- Education: University of Tokyo, Department of Law
- Profession: Head of the Civil Servant Department in the Ministry of Home Affairs

Yoshinobu Ishikawa (石川 嘉延, Ishikawa Yoshinobu; born November 24, 1940) was the governor of Shizuoka Prefecture in Japan, first elected in 1993. A native of Kakegawa, Shizuoka, formerly known as Daitō, Shizuoka, and graduate of the University of Tokyo, Department of Law, he had worked at the Ministry of Home Affairs since 1964 before being elected governor.

== Early career ==
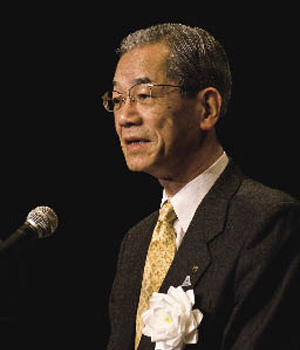
Ishikawa at the Shizuoka Prefectural Gender Equality Center (on February 2, 2008)

After graduating from the University of Tokyo, Department of Law in 1964, he joined the Ministry of Home Affairs and began work in the government bureaucracy. He worked within the ministry for 20 years before being given a position as Head of the Shizuoka Prefecture Home Affairs Office. Following a two-year stint there, he climbed the ladder of the Ministry, was briefly transferred to the National Land Agency, and eventually became Head of the Civil Servant Department in the Home Affairs Ministry in 1992. Only a year after, he decided to run for governor of his home prefecture of Shizuoka and resigned from the ministry in June 1993. He was elected for his first of four terms in August 1993.

== Resignation ==
Due to repeated delays in the opening of Shizuoka Airport, Governor Ishikawa announced at a news conference on March 25, 2009 that he would resign. The airport was the largest construction project in the prefecture at the time but the opening was delayed until June 2009. The main cause of the delay was due to the flawed original survey for the runway. The original survey placed the runway near some trees that were too high and could not be removed. It was decided in March 2009 that the runway would be shortened and therefore, the airport would not open on time.
