= Shōji Ōtake =

Japanese photographer

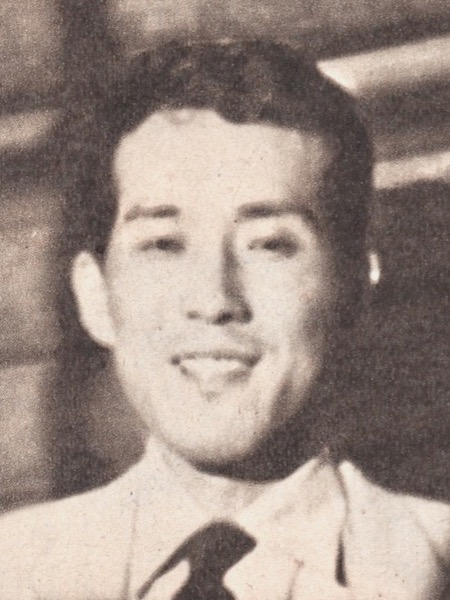
Ootake Syouji Portrait

Shōji Ōtake (大竹 省二, Ōtake Shōji; 15 May 1920 - 2 July 2015) was a Japanese photographer famous for portraits and nudes.

Ōtake was born in Yokosuka (which later became Ōsuka, then Kakegawa), Shizuoka on 15 May 1920, the oldest son of a father who worked in the sake industry and a mother who performed on the koto and (transverse) flute. The boy's mother died when he was six, and he moved to the house of his father's elder sister, his younger brother moved to another house, both in Yokosuka, while his father tried and failed in the transportation industry and quickly moved to Tokyo. A year later, the boy moved to the house of a rich family, still in Yokosuka. He started at school, quickly showing an aptitude for drawing, gaining a special mention in a national contest.

Shōji moved to Tokyo with his father in 1928, living in Nippori with his father's new wife. He became a keen photographer when very young.

Ōtake joined the army, but was able to work as a photographer. In 1947 he managed to attach himself to GHQ, for which he photographed singers and actresses at the Ernie Pyle Theatre. From 1949 he became involved in a succession of photographic organizations, as he continued work as a photojournalist. Starting in 1951, he spent five years photographing classical and other musicians from around the world during their stays in Japan; these photographs were published in Asahi Camera and in 1955 were collected in the highly praised book World Musicians. He was also publishing nude photographs in the magazines Camera and Photo Art.

From the 1950s through the 1970s, Ōtake moved to become the top photographer of women in Japan. For five years from 1971, Ōtake photographed housewives and "OL" nude (sometimes together with their babies or small children, also nude) on Nippon Television; this work too was later collected into books.

By the 1980s, Ōtake's fame and commercial success as a portraitist and photographer of nudes had eclipsed his earlier and very different work. Republication within the volume dedicated to him of the series "Shōwa Shashin Zenshigoto" (1982), and the publication the following year of Haruka naru uta, brought it great acclaim.

Besides photography, Ōtake has also worked as television screenwriter and an essayist. As a photographer, he remained active into his late 80s.

Among the photographers who have trained under Ōtake are Mineko Orisaku and Sanae Numata.

== Books ==
=== Books devoted to Ōtake's work ===
- Sekai no ongakuka (世界の音楽家) / World Musicians. Tokyo: Asahi Shinbunsha, 1955. (in Japanese)
- Onna no naka no onna (女の中のおんな). Tokyo: Geibunsha, 1969. (in Japanese)
- Janetto (ジャネット) Janet. Tokyo: Nippon Camera-sha, 1974. (in Japanese)
- Teru hi kumoru hi (照る日曇る日). Tokyo: Nippon Camera-sha, 1976. (in Japanese)
- Famirī nūdo (ファミリ-ヌ-ド). Tokyo: Asahi Sonorama, 1977. (in Japanese)
- Sekai no ongakuka (世界の音楽家) / Musicians of the World. Sonorama Shashin Sensho 18. Tokyo: Asahi Sonorama, 1979. (in Japanese)
- Ōtake Shōji (大竹省二). Shōwa Shashin Zenshigoto 4. Tokyo: Asahi Shinbunsha, 1982. A survey of Ōtake's career, interspersed with interviews, essays, etc. (in Japanese)
- "Onna" 101 nin no shōzō (「女」101人の肖像). Tokyo: Kōdansha, 1982. (in Japanese)
- Haruka naru uta (遥かなる詩). Tokyo: Kirihara Shoten, 1983. A collection of Ōtake's early work. (in Japanese)
- Ranjuku no gogatsu midori (爛熟の五月みどり). Tokyo: Kōdansha, 1983. ISBN 4-06-100203-1. (in Japanese)
- Onna no te ga himitsu o kataru: Boku no tesō tanbōki (女の手が秘密を語る：ぼくの手相探訪記). Wani no Hon. Tokyo: Besutoserāzu, 1984. ISBN 4-584-00560-5. (in Japanese)
- Hana nareba: Razō (花なれば：裸像). Nihon Geijutsu Shuppansha, 1985. (in Japanese)
- Shōji Ōtake kansō jinsei taidan: Bijo to binan ni zūmuin (大竹省二・観相人生対談：美女と美男にズームイン). Tokyo: Kōdansha, 1985. ISBN 4-06-201691-5. (in Japanese)
- Josei shashin seminā-shū (女性写真セミナ－集). Tokyo: Nippon Camera-sha, 1989. ISBN 4-8179-3007-1. (in Japanese)
- Shōji Ōtake sakuhinshū: Haruka naru uta (大竹省二作品展：遙かなる詩). JCII Photo Salon Library 8. Tokyo: JCII Photo Salon, 1991. Exhibition catalogue. (in Japanese)
- Asakura Miki (麻倉未稀) / Si. 1993. Photo book of the singer Miki Asakura (麻倉未稀, Asakura Miki). Tokyo: Sukora, 1993. ISBN 4-7962-0111-4. (in Japanese)
- Shinpen Haruka naru uta (新編遥かなる詩). Tokyo: Nippon Camera-sha, 1993. ISBN 4-8179-2022-X. (in Japanese)
- Sasurai hana (さすらい花). Photo book of the singer Akiko Kanazawa (金沢明子, Kanazawa Akiko). Take Shobō, 1994. ISBN 4-88475-292-9. (in Japanese)
- Shōji Ōtake sakuhinshū: Shōwa gunzō (大竹省二作品展：昭和群像). JCII Photo Salon Library 75. Tokyo: JCII Photo Salon, 1997. Exhibition catalogue. (in Japanese)
- Shōwa gunzō (昭和群像) Tokyo: Nippon Camera-sha, 1997. ISBN 4-8179-2045-9. A collection of Ōtake's black and white portraits from the 1950s to the 1980s, with an emphasis on earlier material. (in Japanese)
- Shōji Ōtake no "renzu kansōgaku": Raika renzu to kōseiha renzu (大竹省二の「レンズ観相学」ライカレンズと個性派レンズ). Supplement to Asahi Camera, December 1998. (in Japanese)
- Haruka naru kagami: Aru shashinka no shōgen (遥かなる鏡：ある写真家の証言). Tokyo: Tōkyō Shinbun Shuppankyoku, 1998. ISBN 4-8083-0643-3. (in Japanese)
  - Haruka naru kagami: Shashin de tsuzuru haisen-Nihon hiwa (遥かなる鏡：写真で綴る敗戦日本秘話). Chūō Bunko. Tokyo: Chūō-Kōron-sha, 2000. ISBN 4-12-203679-8. (in Japanese)
- Jidai no kao (時代の顔). Tokyo: Asahi Shinbunsha, 2002. Portraits. (in Japanese)
- Akasaka Hinokichō Tekisasu Hausu (赤坂檜町テキサスハウス, Akasaka Hinoki-chō Texas House). Tokyo: Asahi Shinbunsha, 2006. ISBN 4-02-250083-2. Text and photographs by Ōtake, who looks back at his time with the television and other stars of the 1960s in an Asakusa apartment dubbed Texas House. (in Japanese)
- Ōtake Shōji no renzu kansōgaku: Kyōrikei-yō renzu hen (大竹省二のレンズ観相学：距離計用レンズ編, Shōji Ōtake's study of the effects of lenses: Lenses for rangefinder cameras). Kurashikku Kamera Sensho 37. Tokyo: Asahi Sonorama, 2006. ISBN 4-257-12047-9. (in Japanese)

=== Other books showing Ōtake's work ===
- Nihon nūdo meisakushū (日本ヌード名作集, Japanese nudes). Camera Mainichi bessatsu. Tokyo: Mainichi Shinbunsha, 1982. Pp. 126–29 show nudes by Ōtake, 1949–61. (in Japanese)
- Shashinka wa nani o hyōgen shita ka: 1945–1960 (写真家はなにを表現したか1945～1960, What were photographers expressing? 1945–1960). Tokyo: Konica Plaza, 1991. Pp. 70–71 show three portraits of musicians by Ōtake. (in Japanese)

== Laserdisc ==
- Shirubiannu: Ōtake Shōji no sekai (シルビアンヌ：大竹省二の世界) / Sylviane.

== Sources ==
- Jinbō Kyōko (神保京子). "Ōtake Shōji". Nihon shashinka jiten (日本写真家事典) / 328 Outstanding Japanese Photographers. Kyoto: Tankōsha, 2000. ISBN 4-473-01750-8. P.71. (in Japanese) Despite the English-language alternative title, all in Japanese.
- "Nenpu" (年譜, chronology). Ōtake Shōji (大竹省二). Shōwa Shashin Zenshigoto 4. Tokyo: Asahi Shinbunsha, 1982. Pp. 158–59. (in Japanese)
