= Ōtake (surname) =

Ōtake, Otake, Ootake or Ohtake (written: 大竹 or 大嶽) is a Japanese surname. Notable people with the surname include:

- Aiko Otake (大竹 愛子, born 1994), Japanese gravure idol
- Hideo Otake (大竹 英雄, born 1942), Japanese Go player
- Hideyuki Otake (大竹 秀之, born 1967), Japanese volleyball player
- Hiroshi Ōtake (大竹 宏, 1932–2022), Japanese voice actor
- Issei Otake (大竹 壱青, born 1995), Japanese volleyball player
- Jill Otake (born 1973), American judge
- Kan Otake (大竹 寛, born 1983), Japanese baseball player
- Kazuki Ōtake (大竹 一樹, born 1967), Japanese comedian
- Kotaro Otake (大竹 耕太郎, born 1995), Japanese baseball player
- Nami Otake (大竹 七未, born 1974), Japanese women's footballer
- Naoto Otake (大嶽 直人, born 1968), Japanese footballer and manager
- Riho Ōtake (大竹 里歩, born 1993), Japanese volleyball player
- Risuke Otake (大竹 利典, born 1926), Japanese martial artist
- Ruy Ohtake (born 1938), Brazilian architect
- Ryuto Otake (大竹 隆人, born 1988), Japanese footballer
- Shinobu Otake (大竹 しのぶ, born 1957), Japanese actress
- Shinro Ohtake (大竹 伸朗, born 1955), Japanese artist
- Shōji Ōtake (大竹 省二, 1920–2015), Japanese photographer
- Tomie Ohtake (大竹 富江, 1913–2015), Japanese-Brazilian artist
- Yohei Otake (大竹 洋平, born 1989), Japanese footballer
