= Omaesaki Lighthouse =

Omaesaki Lighthouse Omaesaki 御前埼灯台
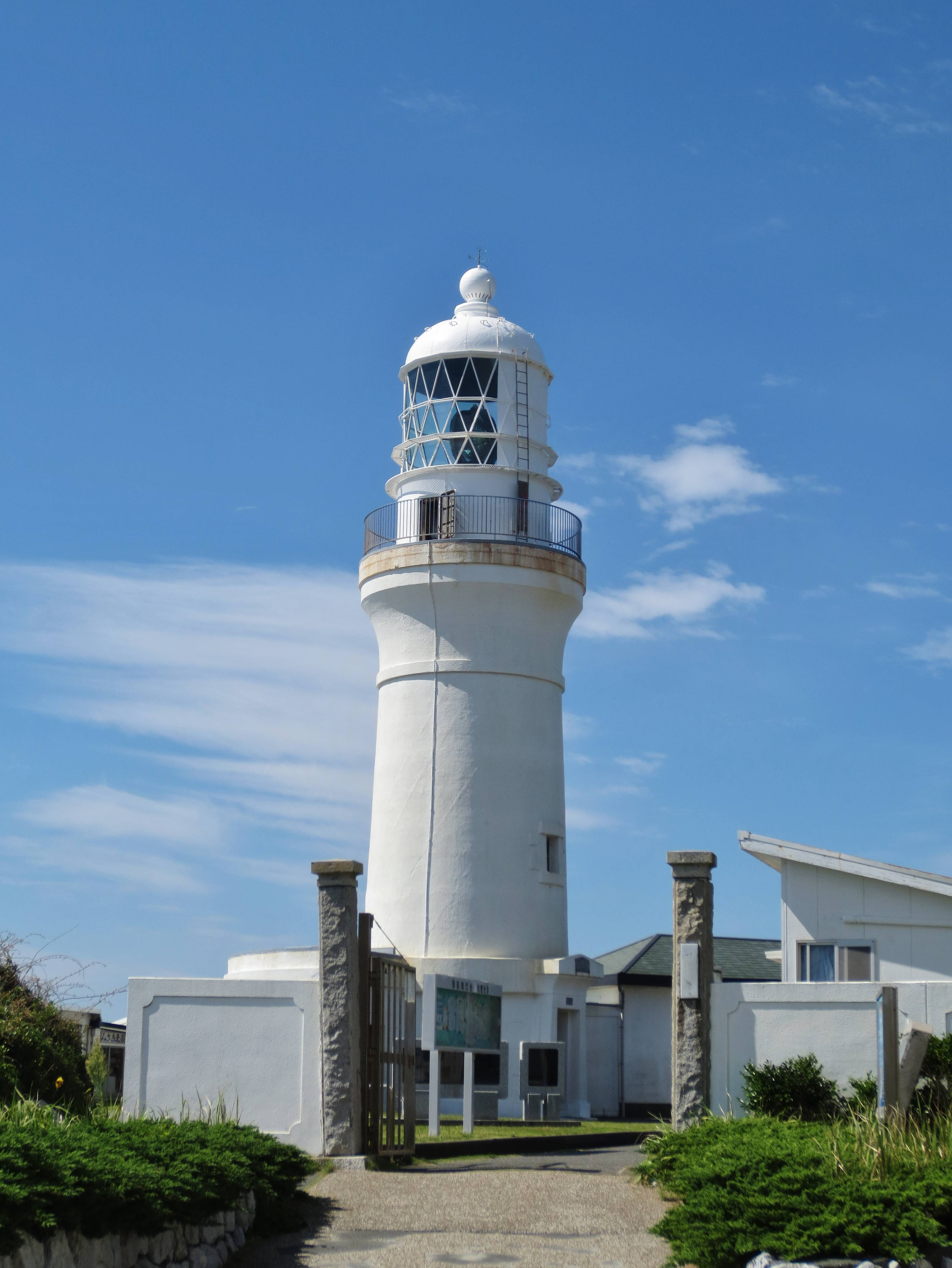
- Omaesaki Lighthouse
- Location: Omaezaki City; Shizuoka Prefecture; Japan
- Coordinates: 34°35′45.0″N 138°13′32.6″E

Tower
- Constructed: 1874
- Foundation: brick and concrete
- Construction: brick tower
- Height: 22.47 metres (73.7 ft)
- Shape: tapered cylindrical tower with balcony and lantern
- Markings: white tower and lantern

Light
- First lit: 1874, 1946
- Focal height: 50.4 metres (165 ft)
- Lens: Third Order Fresnel
- Intensity: 1,300,000 candela
- Range: 36 kilometres (19 nmi)
- Characteristic: Fl W 4s.
- Japan no.: JCG-2492

Omaesaki Lighthouse (御前埼灯台, Omaesaki Tōdai) is a lighthouse located on a hill at the outermost extremity of Cape Omae south of Omaezaki Port, Shizuoka Prefecture, Japan.

A lighthouse was built at Cape Omae as early as 1635, when the Tokugawa Shogunate recognized the frequency of marine accidents on the rocks off the coast of Tōtōmi Province.

== History ==
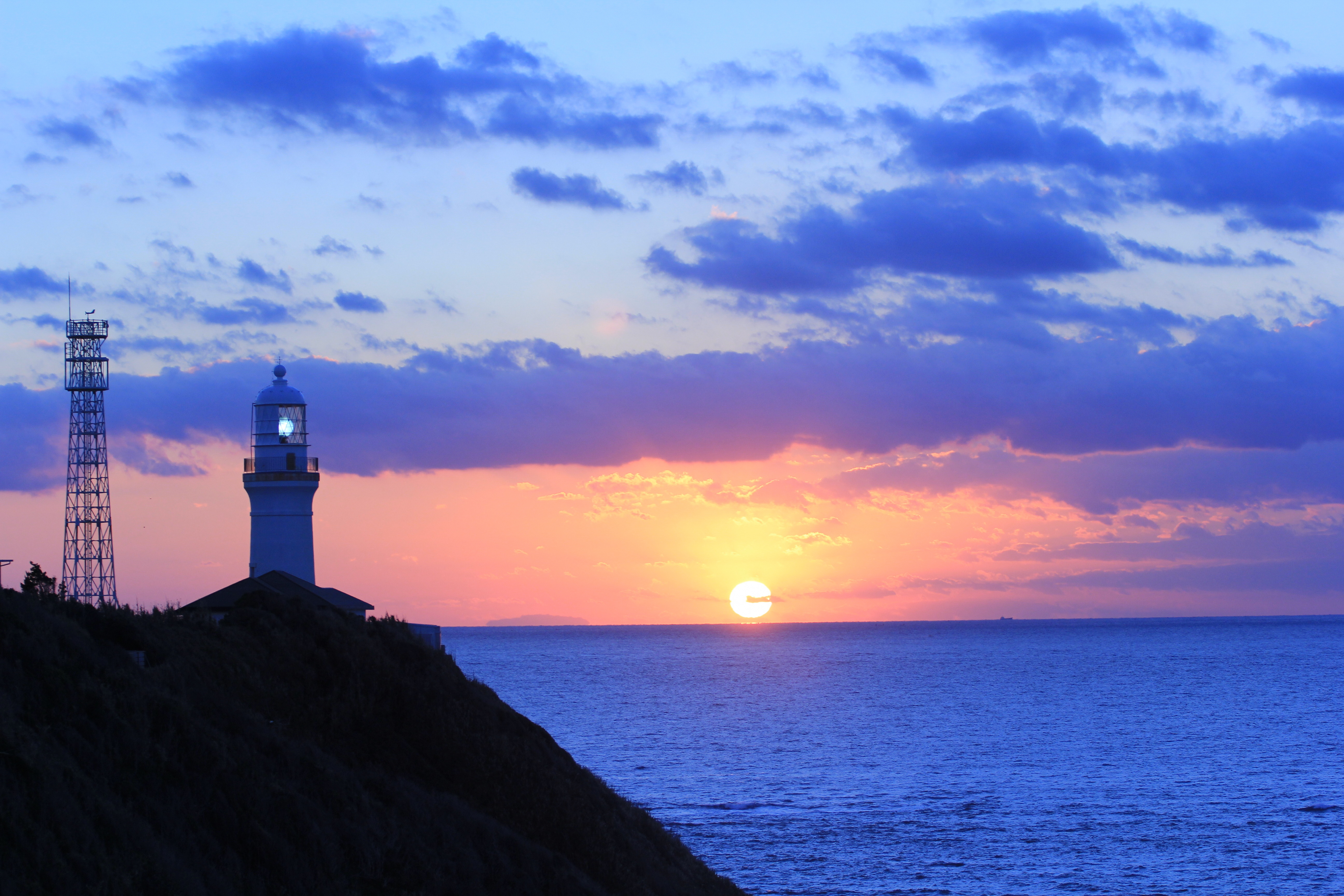
Omaesaki Lighthouse and sunrise

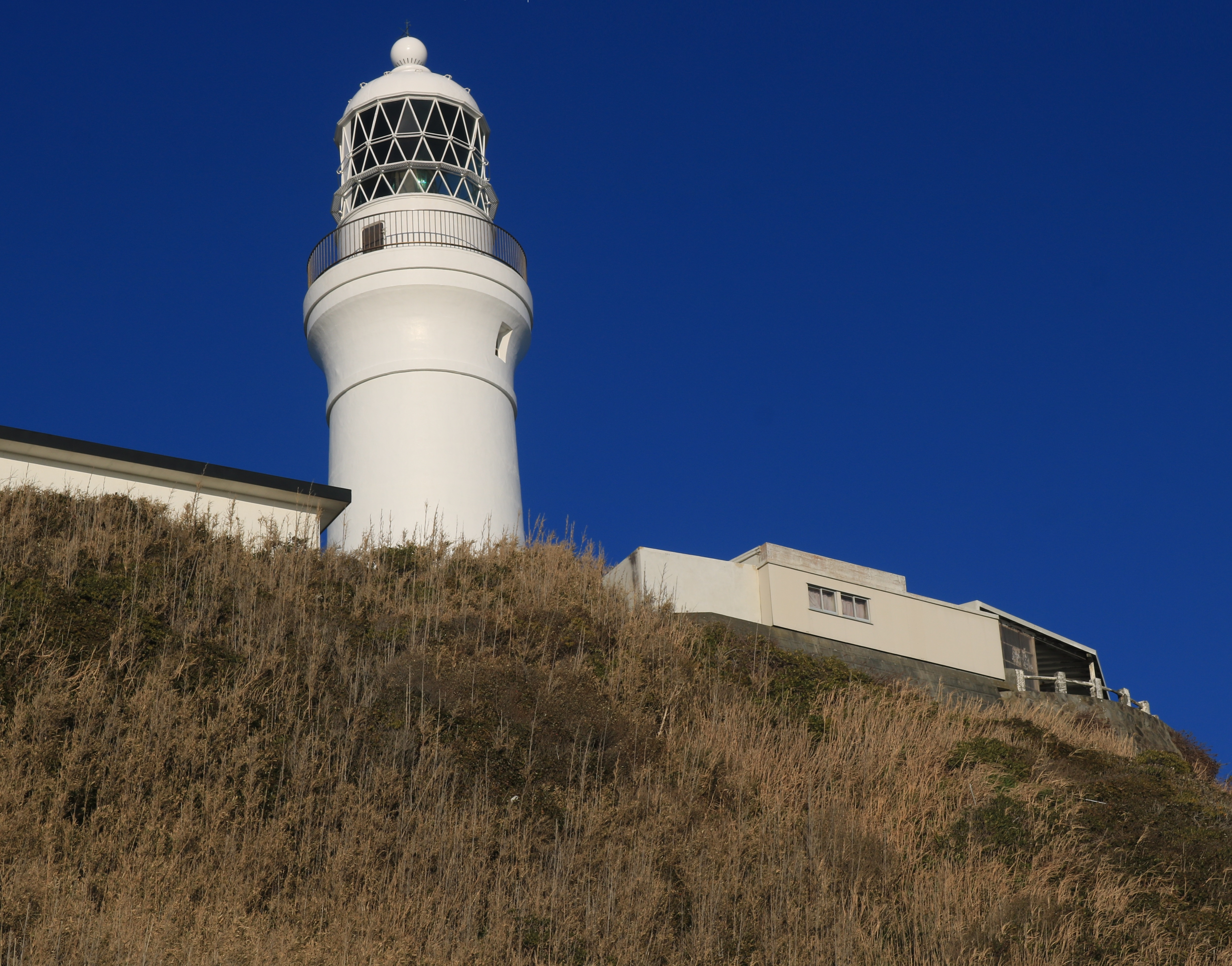
Omaesaki Lighthouse

Omaesaki Lighthouse was one of the 26 lighthouses to be built in Meiji period Japan by British engineer Richard Henry Brunton. Although not one of the eight lighthouses stipulated specifically by the provisions of the Anglo-Japanese Treaty of Amity and Commerce of 1858, construction was given priority by the Meiji government after a Japanese navy vessel grounded on the rocks off Cape Omae on April 8, 1871. Construction began on May 26, 1872, and the lighthouse was completed on May 1, 1874, at a cost of 25,000 yen. The lighthouse is noteworthy as the first to use a Fresnel lens in Japan.

The light was upgraded to a more powerful beam in 1917. During World War II, Omaesaki Lighthouse was bombarded by United States Navy warships, cracking its lens and causing severe damage to its structure. The light was repaired after the end of the war, and its lens upgraded to a third order Fresnel. It went back into operation on March 24, 1949.

Omaesaki Lighthouse is currently open to the public, and can be ascended for a panoramic view of the Pacific Ocean. It is registered with the Japanese government as an “A-grade Lighthouse” for historic preservation and is listed as one of the “50 Lighthouses of Japan” by the Japan Lighthouse Association. It is operated by the Japan Coast Guard.

== Name ==
Omaesaki Lighthouse is located at Cape Omae (御前崎, Omae-zaki) in Omaezaki City (御前崎市, Omaezaki-shi), Shizuoka Prefecture. But the lighthouse name is "Omaesaki Lighthouse (御前埼灯台, Omaesaki Tōdai)".

== See also ==
- List of lighthouses in Japan
