= Ogasa District, Shizuoka =

Former district in Shizuoka prefecture, Japan

Ogasa District (小笠郡, Ogasa-gun) was a rural district located in western Shizuoka Prefecture, Japan.

== Population ==
As of the end of 2003 (the last data available before its dissolution), the district had an estimated population of 82,248 and a population density of 472.47 persons per km^{2}. Its total area was 174.08 km^{2}.

== History ==
Ogasa District was created on April 1, 1896 through the merger of former Kito District (城東郡, Kito-gun) and Saya District (佐野郡, Saya-gun). At the time it was divided into one town (Kakegawa) and 45 villages. Osuka Village was renamed Yokosuka and was elevated to town status on May 1, 1914, and Nishikata Village became Horinouchi Town on January 1, 1922. Ikeshinden was raised to town status on November 1, 1940. Following some consolidation in 1942–1943, the district had four towns and 35 villages.

In 1950–1951, Kakegawa expanded by annexing four neighboring villages, and the town of Kikugawa was created on January 1, 1954 by the merger of Horinouchi Town with three neighboring villages. Kakegawa was raised to city status on March 1, 1954. In a round of mergers and consolidation from 1954 to 1957, the towns of Ogasa (March 31, 1954), Hamaoka (March 31, 1955), and Ōsuka (June 1, 1956) were created and the number of villages reduced from 27 to 2. Mikasa Village was annexed by Kakegawa on October 1, 1960 and Kito Village by Ohama Town on April 1, 1973 to form the town of Daitō.

=== Recent mergers ===
- On April 1, 2004 - the town of Hamaoka was merged with the former town of Omaezaki (from Haibara District) to create the city of Omaezaki.
- On January 17, 2005 - the former town of Kikugawa absorbed the town of Ogasa to create the city of Kikugawa.
- On April 1, 2005 - the towns of Daitō and Ōsuka were merged into the expanded city of Kakegawa. Ogasa District was dissolved as a result of this merger.
