= Kikugawa fortification ruins =

- 菊川城館遺跡群
- Kikugawa, Shizuoka prefecture, Japan

Site information
- Type: Hirayama-style Japanese castle
- Open to the public: no
- Condition: ruins

Location
- Coordinates: 34°43′22″N 138°04′36″E

Site history
- Built: Sengoku period

The Kikugawa Fortification ruins (菊川城館遺跡群, Kikugawa-jōkan iseki-gun) are a number of early Sengoku period fortifications located in what is now part of the city of Kikugawa, Shizuoka, Japan. These sites were collectively designed a National Historic Site in 2004. The designation consists of the Takada Yashiki ruins (高田大屋敷遺跡) and Yokoji Fortified Residence ruins (横地氏城館跡).

== Overview ==
The Takeda Yashiki ruins are located near the junction of Kikugawa and Kamikosu rivers, about 11 meters above sea level, and were a key point in controlling traffic, especially the salt trade, from the Pacific coast to Shinano Province. The site was excavated in 1988 and found to measure approximately 70 meters from east-to-west and about 93 meters north-to-south, and to consist of a fortified square residence building surrounded by moats and a dike as protection against floods.

The Yokoji fortified residence ruins are located about three kilometers east of the Takada Yashiki ruins at the southwest end of the Makinohara plateau along the Kikugawa River. The site was excavated in 1987 and was found to contain the remains of a number of fortified residences, temples, a mountain castle and grave sites from the late 12th to 15th centuries, extending about two kilometers east-to-west and about 0.6 kilometers north-to-south. The Yokoji clan were a cadet branch of the Minamoto clan who claimed descent from Minamoto no Yoshiie. The Yokoji were one of leading samurai clans in this area of Tōtōmi Province, and are mentioned in Kamakura period Azuma Kagami as gokenin of the shogunate. During the Muromachi period, they were direct retainers of the Ashikaga shogunate and prospered greatly due to their geographic location controlling traffic along the coast and also towards Shinano Province. Towards the start of the Sengoku period, the Yokoji clan came into conflict with the neighboring Imagawa clan of Suruga Province to the east. Imagawa Yoshitada invaded Tōtōmi in 1476, capturing and destroying Yokoji Castle after a seven-day siege. However, on his return to Suruga, his retinue was ambushed by surviving retainers of the Yokoji clan, and he died from an arrow wound before he could reach his home province.

Yokoji Castle spreads over a peninsula between the Ushibuchi River and the Oku-Yokoji River, and is connected to the Makinohara Heights by narrow bottleneck. The eastern section of the castle is roughly divided into three main enclosures, protected to a certain extent by the natural cliffs and ravines, but also by occasional dry moats and clay walls. The western section of the castle contains the main bailey, which measures 40 by 20 meters. It is also protected by dry moats and by several small surrounding enclosures. Outside the main castle, south of the western section of the castle, was a separate enclosure measuring 100 by 40 meters called the Senjo-jiki. This appears to have been a mustering location for the defenders. To the east of this enclosure was another small fortification, the Naka-no-shiro, which served to guard the eastern section of the castle.

The Imagawa clan consolidated their control of Tōtōmi Province by 1500 under Imagawa Ujichika, despite occasional attempted by survivors of the Yokoji clan to regain power. After the Imagawa constructed Kakegawa Castle, the site was allowed to fall into ruin. At present, no buildings remain, but the outlines of the various enclosures can still be seen on the castle hill, and are reflected by local place names on maps. The castle site is 15-minutes by car from the Tōmei Expressway Kikugawa interchange.

== See also ==
- List of Historic Sites of Japan (Shizuoka)
