= Yukie Osumi =

Japanese metalsmith

Yukie Osumi (born 1945; Japanese: 大角幸枝, romanized: Ōsumi Yukie) is a Japanese metalsmith. In 2015, she became the first woman in her field to be named a Living National Treasure of Japan.

== Biography ==
Yukie Osumi was born in Kakegawa, Shizuoka Prefecture, in 1945. She studied art history at Tokyo University of the Arts, graduating in 1969.

When Osumi began metalworking, very few Japanese women were involved in the field. However, she gained the support of mentors such as the well-known metalsmiths Shiro Sekiya and Moriyuki Katsura, the latter of whom granted her her first apprenticeship. After many years of pursuing her craft while working various side jobs to make ends meet, she was finally able to establish herself as a full-time artist and art professor at age 41.

== Style and influences ==
Osumi is known for her hand-shaped metal vessels, which she hammers into shape from a flat plate before applying intricate decorations. She is a master of the nunome zōgan metal inlay technique. Each of her pieces takes between three and six months to complete. Her designs are often drawn from natural motifs, influenced in part by her childhood in the countryside of Shizuoka.

== Exhibitions ==
Her pieces have been exhibited both in Japan and abroad, including in the United States and Italy.

== Teaching ==
In addition to her work as a craftsperson, Osumi has taught at Tokyo Kasei University, where she is now a professor emeritus.

== Awards ==
For her work, Osumi won the Japan Kōgei Association's President's Award in 1987. In 2014, she was awarded a residency in Japanese metalwork design at the Smithsonian's Freer-Sackler Gallery, the first artist to do so.

In 2015, she was named a Living National Treasure of Japan, as part of a program that supports and honors craftspeople who work using traditional techniques. She was the first female metalsmith to receive this designation. Two years later, she was awarded the Order of the Rising Sun, Gold Rays with Rosette.
