= Ikoinohiroba Station =

Railway station in Kakegawa, Shizuoka Prefecture, Japan

Coordinates: 34.788072°N 137.963776°E

Ikoinohiroba Station いこいの広場駅
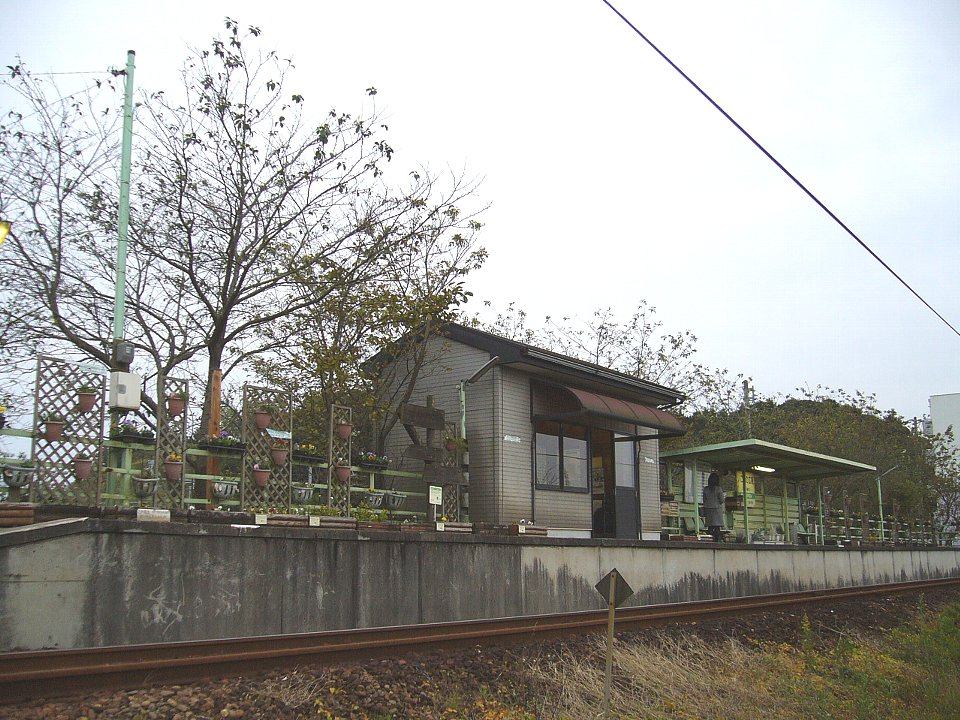
- Ikoinohiroba Station platform

General information
- Location: Hosoya-aze, Kakegawa, Shizuoka （静岡県 掛川市細谷字松向） Japan
- Operator: Tenryū Hamanako Railroad
- Line: Tenryū Hamanako Line

History
- Opened: 1988
Location

Ikoinohiroba Station (いこいの広場駅, Ikoinohiroba-eki) is a train station on the Tenryū Hamanako Line in Kakegawa, Shizuoka Prefecture, Japan. It is 5.5 kilometres (3.4 mi) by rail from the terminus of the line at Kakegawa Station.

== History ==
Ikoinohiroba Station was established on April 17, 1988, as a temporary station for use during the Shizuoka Prefectural qualifying games of the annual National High School Baseball Championship.

== Lines ==
- Tenryū Hamanako Railroad
  - Tenryū Hamanako Line

== Layout ==
Ikoinohiroba Station is an unstaffed station with a single elevated side platform, and a small wooden shelter built onto the platform.

== Adjacent stations ==
| « | Service | » |
Tenryū Hamanako Railroad
Tenryū Hamanako Line
| Sakuragi | - | Hosoya |
