= Nakanoshima (Kagoshima) =

Island within the Ryukyu Islands

Native name: 中之島
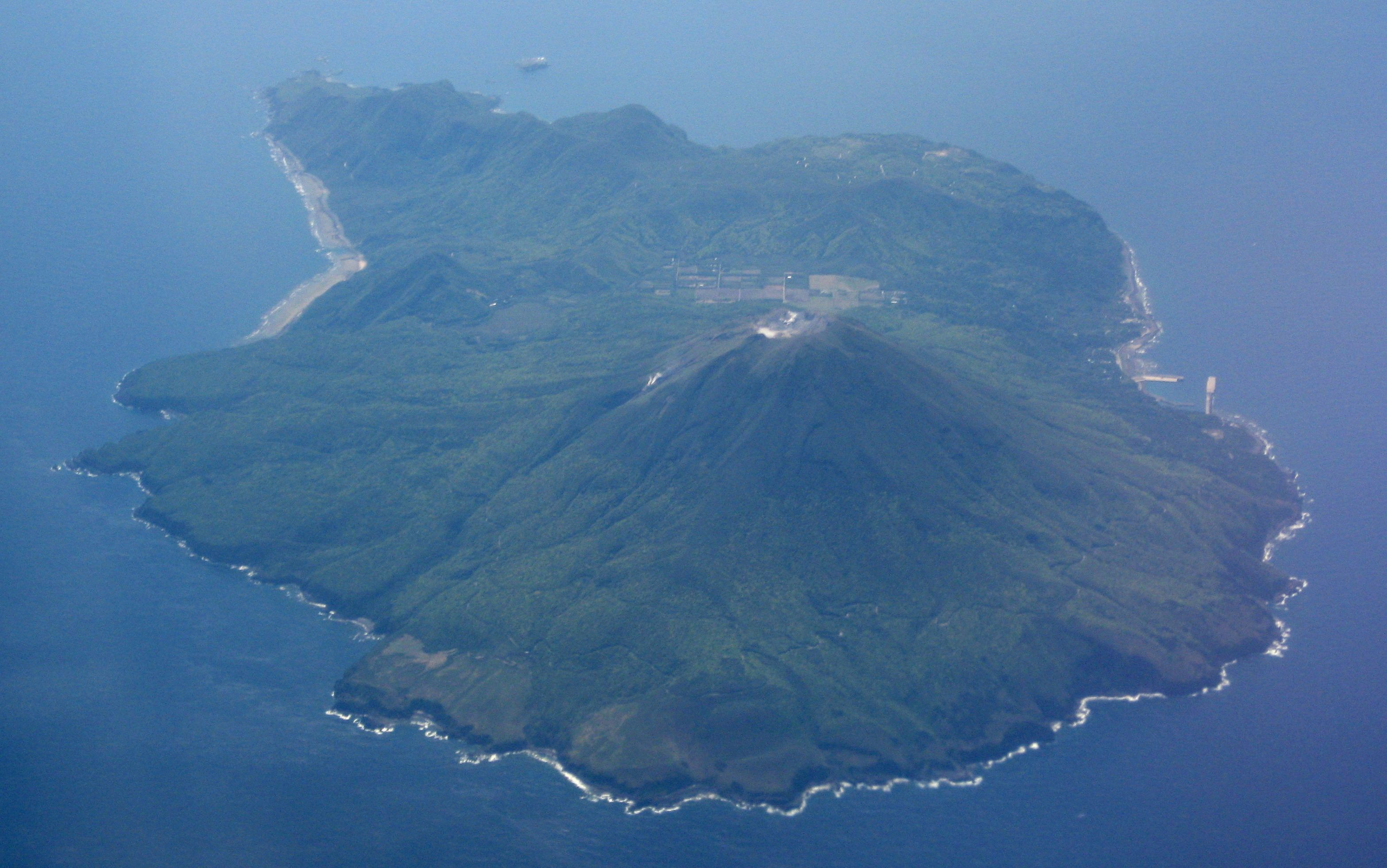

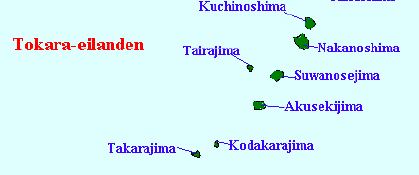

Geography
- Location: East China Sea
- Coordinates: 29°51′0″N 129°52′12″E
- Archipelago: Tokara Islands
- Area: 34.47 km^{2} (13.31 sq mi)
- Length: 9 km (5.6 mi)
- Width: 5 km (3.1 mi)
- Coastline: 31.8 km (19.76 mi)
- Highest elevation: 979 m (3212 ft)
- Highest point: Otake

Administration
- Japan
- Kagoshima Prefecture

Demographics
- Population: 167 (2004)
- Pop. density: 4.84/km^{2} (12.54/sq mi)
- Ethnic groups: Japanese

Nakanoshima (Japanese: 中之島), is a volcanic island located in the Tokara Islands, part of the Kagoshima Prefecture, Japan. It is the largest and most populous island of the islands in Toshima village. The island, 34.47 km^{2} in area, had 167 inhabitants as of 2005. The island has no airport, and access is normally by ferry to the city of Kagoshima on the mainland, seven hours away. The islanders are dependent mainly on agriculture, fishing and seasonal tourism. The island's attractions include hot springs, a lighthouse, an observatory and a museum of local history and folklore.

== Geography ==
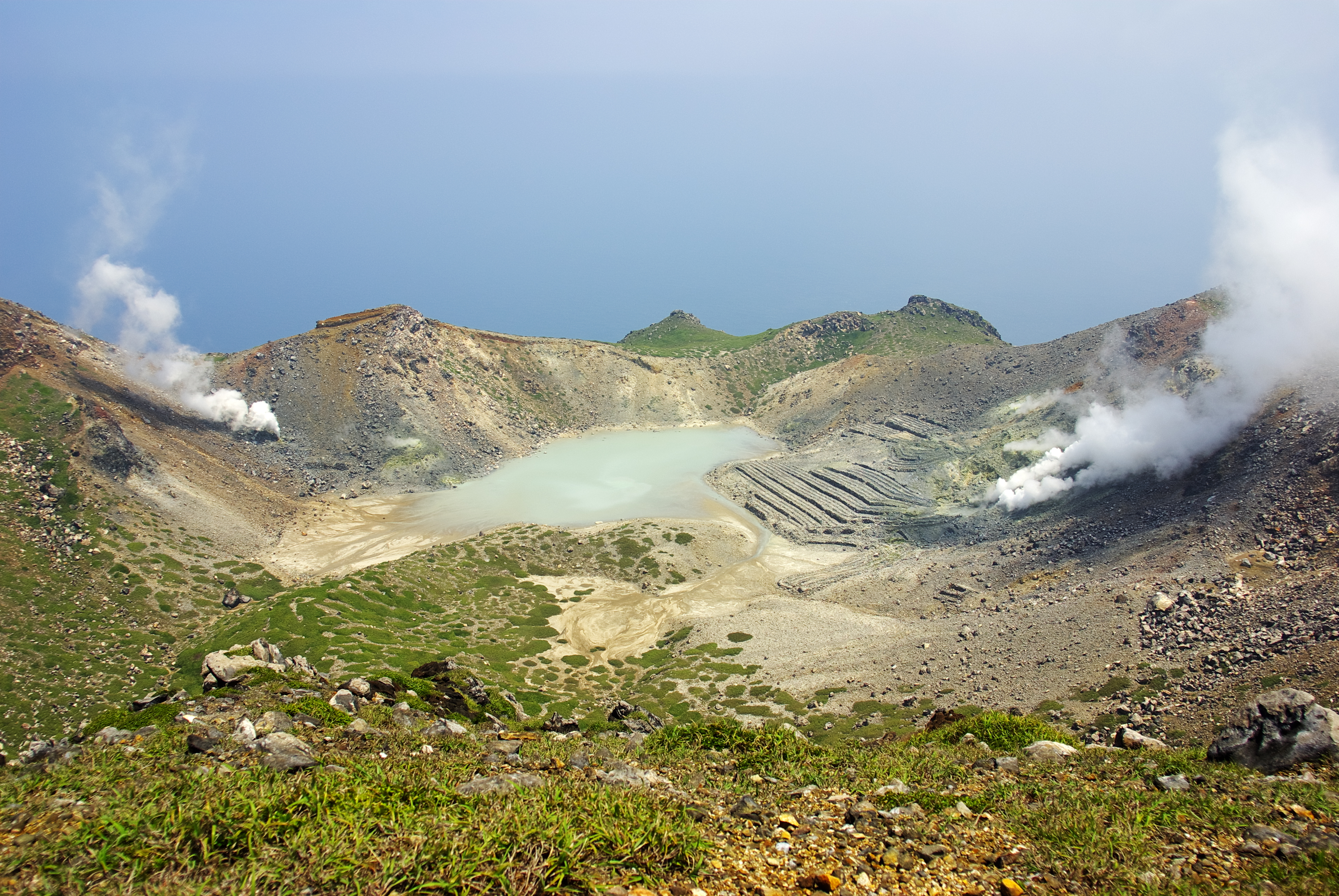
Crater

Nakanoshima is the largest island in the Tokara archipelago, with dimensions of 9 kilometres (5.6 mi) by 5 kilometres (3.1 mi). It is located 150 kilometres (81 nmi) south from Kyushu.

The northern end of the island is dominated by Otake (御岳, O-take), an active volcano which last erupted in 1914. The mountain was mined for sulphur until 1944. With a height of 979 metres (3,212 ft) above sea level, the mountain is the exposed cone of an active stratovolcano arising from the ocean floor.

A small plateau separates Otake from eroded remains of another volcano. The local climate is classified as subtropical, with a rainy season from May through September.

=== Climate ===
Climate data for Nakanoshima (2003−2020 normals, extremes 2002−present)
Month	Jan	Feb	Mar	Apr	May	Jun	Jul	Aug	Sep	Oct	Nov	Dec	Year
Record high °C (°F)	21.7 (71.1)	24.0 (75.2)	24.8 (76.6)	25.9 (78.6)	31.1 (88.0)	31.8 (89.2)	34.4 (93.9)	35.2 (95.4)	32.2 (90.0)	30.6 (87.1)	26.2 (79.2)	23.1 (73.6)	35.2 (95.4)
Mean daily maximum °C (°F)	14.2 (57.6)	15.3 (59.5)	17.4 (63.3)	20.6 (69.1)	23.8 (74.8)	26.0 (78.8)	29.6 (85.3)	30.1 (86.2)	28.2 (82.8)	24.7 (76.5)	20.7 (69.3)	16.3 (61.3)	22.2 (72.0)
Daily mean °C (°F)	11.1 (52.0)	12.0 (53.6)	13.7 (56.7)	16.8 (62.2)	20.3 (68.5)	23.4 (74.1)	26.4 (79.5)	26.7 (80.1)	24.9 (76.8)	21.4 (70.5)	17.5 (63.5)	13.1 (55.6)	18.9 (66.1)
Mean daily minimum °C (°F)	7.6 (45.7)	8.3 (46.9)	9.8 (49.6)	12.6 (54.7)	16.4 (61.5)	21.0 (69.8)	24.0 (75.2)	24.0 (75.2)	22.0 (71.6)	18.2 (64.8)	14.0 (57.2)	9.8 (49.6)	15.6 (60.2)
Record low °C (°F)	−1.1 (30.0)	−1.3 (29.7)	0.5 (32.9)	1.0 (33.8)	5.6 (42.1)	11.6 (52.9)	17.2 (63.0)	17.7 (63.9)	14.8 (58.6)	7.2 (45.0)	4.0 (39.2)	2.0 (35.6)	−1.3 (29.7)
Average precipitation mm (inches)	196.7 (7.74)	219.6 (8.65)	276.3 (10.88)	286.1 (11.26)	367.3 (14.46)	757.9 (29.84)	323.9 (12.75)	193.4 (7.61)	320.8 (12.63)	238.3 (9.38)	256.5 (10.10)	204.8 (8.06)	3,626.7 (142.78)
Average precipitation days (≥ 1.0 mm)	15.4	13.8	14.0	12.7	13.9	18.4	10.0	11.8	13.4	11.4	11.9	15.2	161.9
Mean monthly sunshine hours	66.4	69.9	106.6	133.8	128.9	70.9	127.1	155.1	120.4	135.7	101.1	72.9	1,294.1
Source: Japan Meteorological Agency

== History ==
Nakanoshima has been populated for several thousand years. The island was once part of the Ryukyu Kingdom. During the Edo period, Nakanoshima was part of Satsuma Domain and was administered as part of Kawabe District. In 1896, the island was transferred to the administrative control of Ōshima District, Kagoshima, and from 1911 was administered as part of the village of Toshima, Kagoshima. From 1946-1952, the island was administered by the United States as part of the Provisional Government of Northern Ryukyu Islands. Until 1956, the village hall for Toshima Village was located on Nakanoshima. It was then relocated to within the city of Kagoshima.

In early 1950, a small herd of wild horses in the south of the island were identified as a distinct breed, named the Tokara pony. This species only occurs on Nakanoshima and is believed to have been brought to the island around 1890 from Kikaijima, an island near Amami Ōshima. After World War II, the species almost became extinct, and survivors were removed to a ranch operated by Kagoshima University on mainland Kagoshima for protection. Today, some have been reintroduced to Nakanoshima.

== See also ==
- List of volcanoes in Japan
