= Hamaoka, Shizuoka =

Hamaoka 浜岡町
- Former municipality
- Flag Emblem

- Location in Japan
- Coordinates: 34.6271°N 138.1486°E
- Country: Japan
- Region: Chūbu (Tōkai)
- Prefecture: Shizuoka Prefecture
- District: Ogasa
- Merged: April 1, 2004 (now part of Omaezaki)

Area
  - Total: 53.57 km^{2} (20.68 sq mi)

Population (March 1, 2004)
  - Total: 24,774
  - Density: 462.5/km^{2} (1,198/sq mi)
- Time zone: UTC+09:00 (JST)

Hamaoka (浜岡町, Hamaoka-chō) was a town located in Ogasa District, Shizuoka Prefecture, Japan.

As of March 1, 2004, the town had an estimated population of 24,774 and a density of 462.5 persons per km^{2}. The total area was 53.57 km^{2}.

Hamaoka was founded as a town in 1955 through the merger of Ikeshinden Town with Sakura, Kitaki, Asahina and Niino Villages.

On April 1, 2004, Hamaoka, along with the former town of Omaezaki (from Haibara District), was merged to create the city of Omaezaki.

Hamaoka is noted as the site of the Hamaoka Nuclear Power Plant operated by Chubu Electric Power.
