= Ogasa, Shizuoka =

Ogasa 小笠町
- Former municipality
- Flag Seal

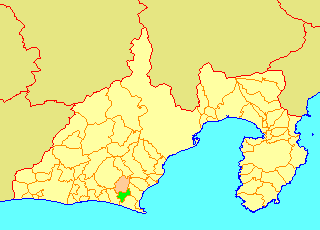
- Location of Ogasa in Shizuoka Prefecture
- Country: Japan
- Region: Chūbu (Tōkai)
- Prefecture: Shizuoka Prefecture
- District: Ogasa
- Merged: January 17, 2005 (now part of Kikugawa)

Area
  - Total: 30.36 km^{2} (11.72 sq mi)

Population (April 1, 2005)
  - Total: 15,968
  - Density: 526/km^{2} (1,360/sq mi)
- Time zone: UTC+09:00 (JST)
- Symbols
- Flower: Rhododendron
- Tree: Podocarpaceae

Ogasa (小笠町, Ogasa-chō) was a town located in Ogasa District, Shizuoka Prefecture, Japan.

== Population ==
At the time of its merger, the town has an estimated population of 15,968 and a density of 526 persons per km^{2}.

== Geography ==
The total area is 30.36 km^{2}.

== Industry ==
The main agricultural products of the area include green tea, aloe and blueberries.

== Transportation ==
The nearest train station was Kikugawa Station on the Tōkaidō Main Line.

== Merge ==
On January 17, 2005, Ogasa, along with the former town of Kikugawa (also from Ogasa District), was merged to create the city of Kikugawa and thus no longer exists as an independent municipality.
