= Otake (Nakanoshima) =

Stratovolcano in Kagoshima Prefecture, Japan

- 御岳
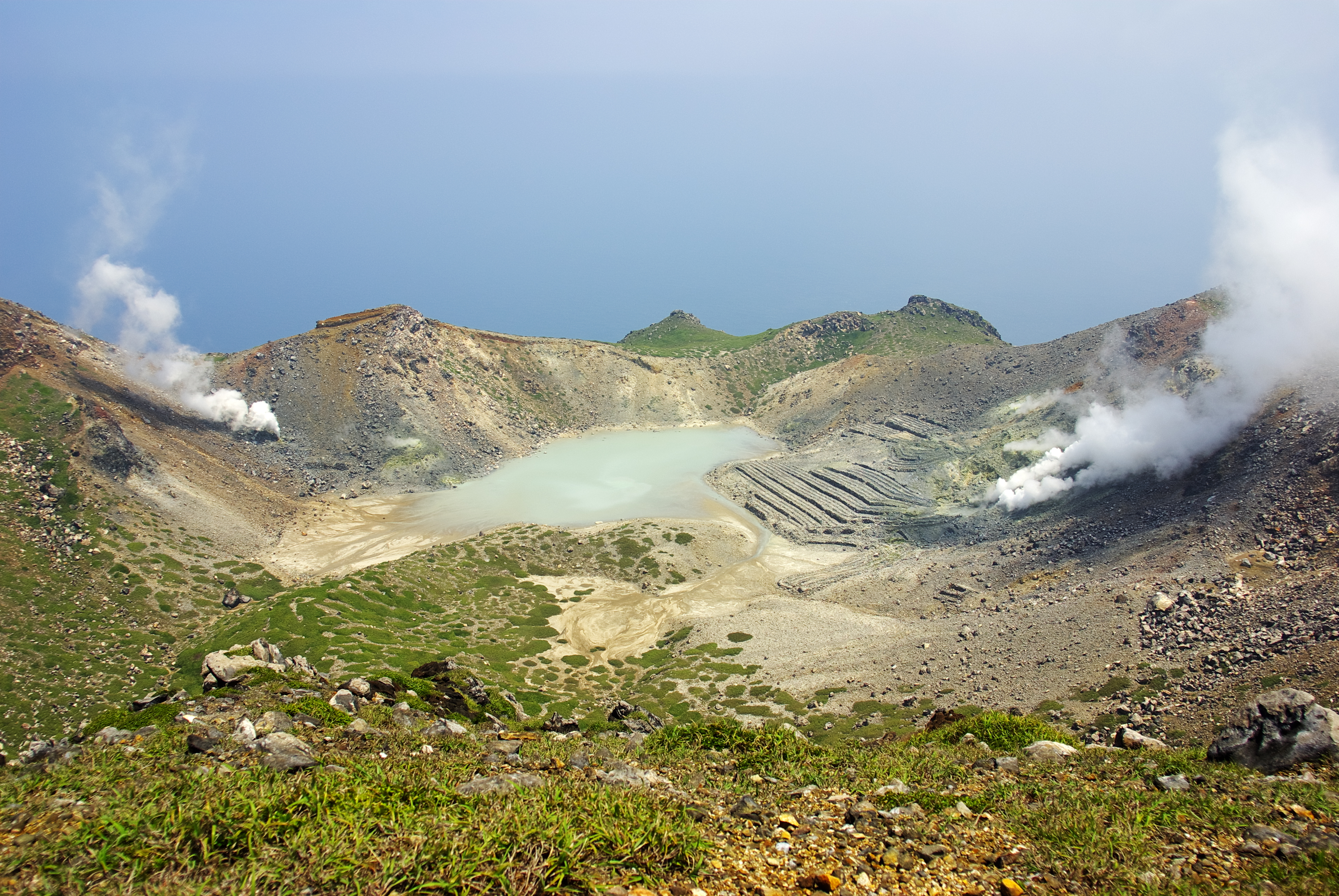
- Inside the crater. (May 2007)

Highest point
- Elevation: 979 m (3,212 ft)
- Prominence: 979 m (3,212 ft)
- Listing: List of mountains and hills of Japan by height List of volcanoes in Japan
- Coordinates: 29°51′33″N 129°51′25″E

Naming
- English translation: honorable mountain
- Language of name: Japanese

Geography
- Location: Nakanoshima, Japan
- Topo map(s): Geographical Survey Institute, 25000:1 中之島, 50000:1 中之島

Geology
- Rock age: Late Pleistocene-Holocene
- Mountain type: stratovolcano
- Volcanic arc: Ryukyu arc
- Last eruption: October 1944

Otake (御岳, O-take) is a stratovolcano in the Tokara Islands of Japan. It is the largest mountain on Nakanoshima, which is part of the village of Toshima in Kagoshima District of Kagoshima Prefecture. Being the largest mountain on a small island, it is also referred to as Nakanoshima. It is also called "Tokara Fuji" from its shape.

The mountain is an andesitic volcano. The volcano had a minor mud eruption in January 1914. In October 1949, the summit crater produced an ash cloud. The rock of the mountain is non-alkali mafic rock produced in the last 18,000 years.

Sulphur mining took place on the southeast flank until 1944. During the rainy season, the summit crater fills with water.

== Gallery ==
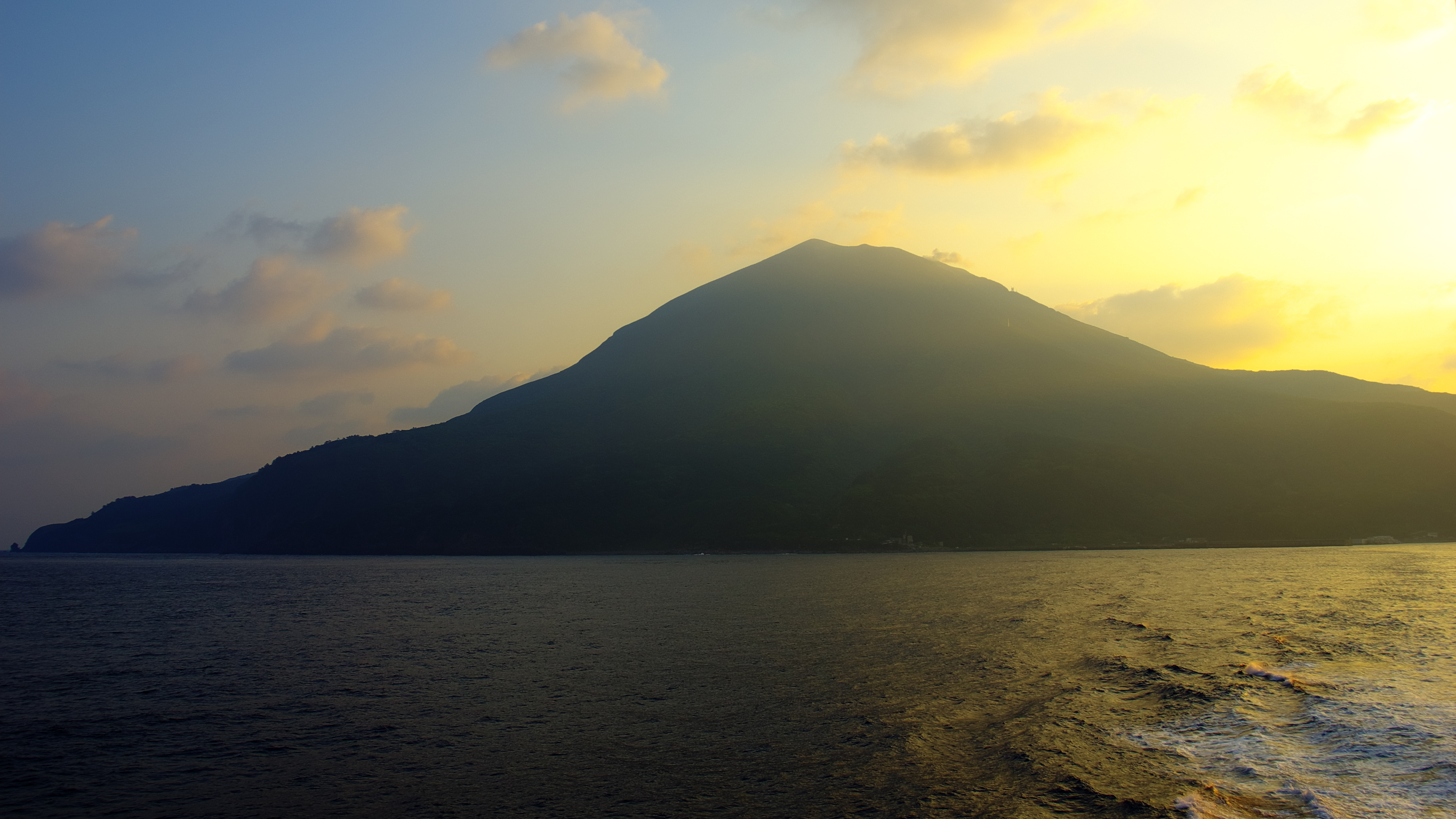
Otake at dawn seen from the sea

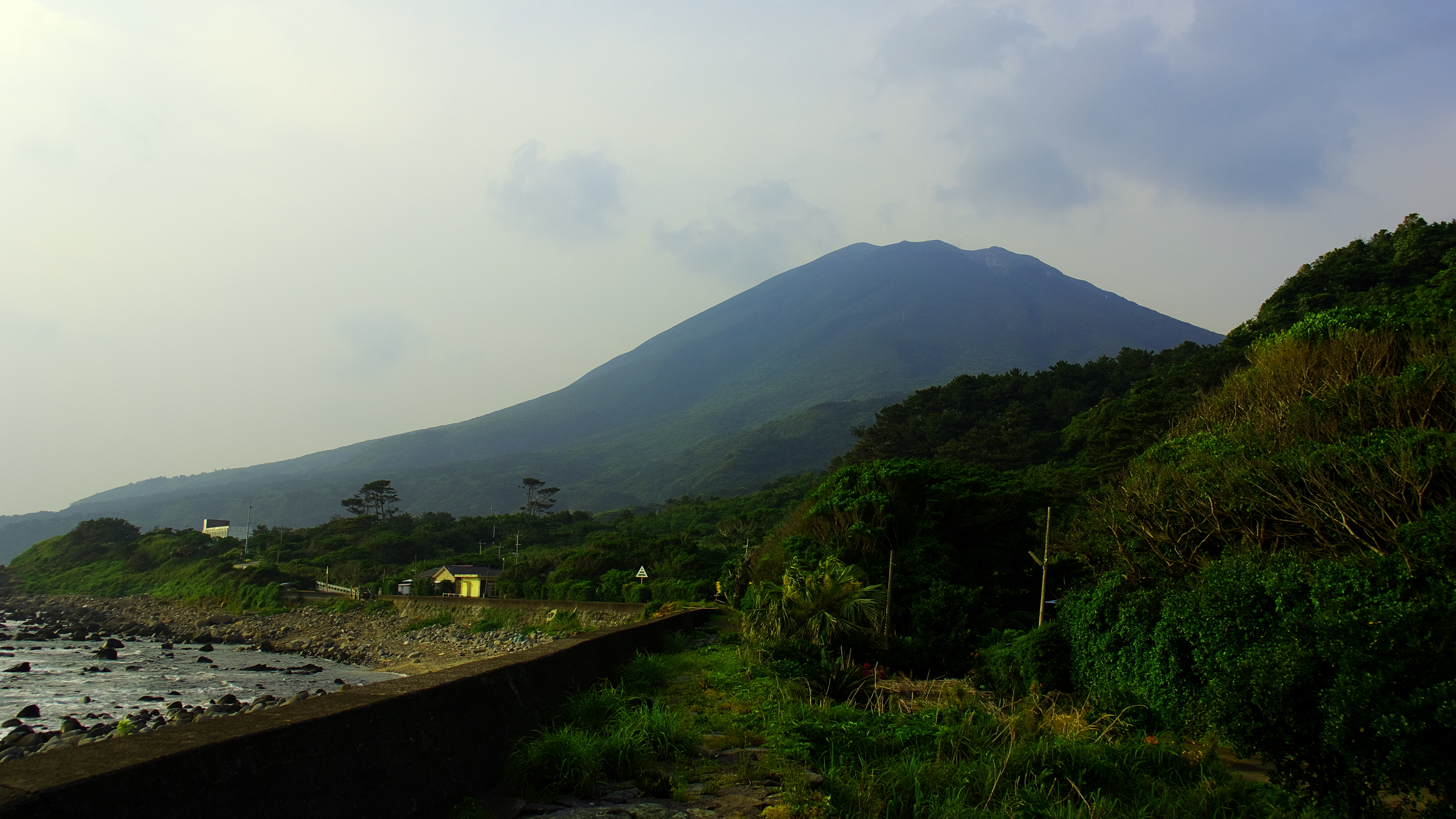
Otake seen from the west coast of Nakanoshima

== See also ==
- List of volcanoes in Japan
