= Ontake =

Ontake may refer to:

- Mount Ontake, the second-highest volcano in Japan, located on Honshu
- 2330 Ontake, a main-belt asteroid named after the volcano
