= Ōsuka, Shizuoka =

Ōsuka 大須賀町
- Former municipality
- Flag Seal

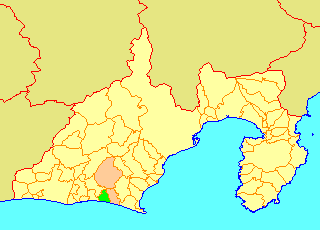
- Location of Ōsuka in Shizuoka Prefecture
- Country: Japan
- Region: Chūbu (Tōkai)
- Prefecture: Shizuoka Prefecture
- District: Ogasa
- Merged: April 1, 2005 (now part of Kakegawa)

Area
  - Total: 33.71 km^{2} (13.02 sq mi)

Population (April 1, 2005)
  - Total: 12,369
  - Density: 367/km^{2} (950/sq mi)
- Time zone: UTC+09:00 (JST)
- Symbols
- Flower: azalea
- Tree: pine

Ōsuka (大須賀町, Ōsuka-chō) was a town located in Ogasa District, Shizuoka Prefecture, Japan.

== Population ==
As of April 1, 2005, the town had an estimated population of 12,369 and a density of 367 persons per km^{2}.

== Geography ==
The total area was 33.71 km^{2}.

== Economy ==
Its main agricultural products were green tea, melons, and strawberries.

== History ==
On April 1, 2005, Ōsuka, along with the town of Daitō (also from Ogasa District), was merged into the expanded city of Kakegawa.

During the Edo period, Ōsuka was the center of Yokosuka Domain. The town was formed in 1956 through the merger of former Yokosuka Town with Obuchi Village.
