= Daitō, Shizuoka =

Daitō 大東町
- Former municipality
- Flag Emblem

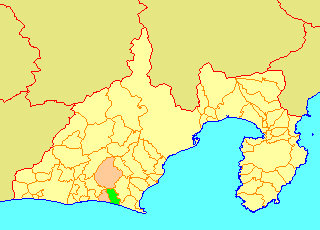
- Location of Daitō in Shizuoka Prefecture

- Location in Japan
- Coordinates: 34.6827°N 138.0540°E
- Country: Japan
- Region: Chūbu (Tōkai)
- Prefecture: Shizuoka Prefecture
- District: Ogasa
- Merged: April 1, 2005 (now part of Kakegawa)

Area
  - Total: 46.13 km^{2} (17.81 sq mi)

Population (March 1, 2005)
  - Total: 20,937
  - Density: 453.86/km^{2} (1,175.5/sq mi)
- Time zone: UTC+09:00 (JST)
- Symbols
- Flower: Narcissus
- Tree: pine

Daitō (大東町, Daitō-chō) was a town located in Ogasa District, Shizuoka Prefecture, Japan.

Daitō Town was created in 1973 through the merger of Ohama Town with Joto Village.

As of April 2004, the town had an estimated population of 20,937 and a population density of 453.86 persons per km^{2}. The total area was 46.13 km^{2}. The main agricultural products were green tea, melons, strawberries and sake.

On April 1, 2005, Daitō, along with the town of Ōsuka (also from Ogasa District), was merged into the expanded city of Kakegawa.
