= Aiko Otake =

Japanese gravure idol

- 大竹 愛子
- Born: March 10, 1994 (age 31); Kanagawa Prefecture, Japan
- Occupation: Gravure idol
- Years active: 2009–present
- Height: 162 cm (5 ft 4 in)
- Website: Official blog

Aiko Otake (大竹 愛子, Ōtake Aiko; born March 10, 1994) is a Japanese gravure idol of Spanish, Austrian, Chinese, Japanese and Filipino descent who debuted in 2010. Otake and her family were featured in a Fuji TV documentary, The Non-fiction, on the difficulties of becoming an idol.

== DVD ==
- Pre-pre-pudding! (May 20, 2009)
- New Kiss (August 27, 2010)
- Whipped Cream (November 26, 2010)
- Crazy for You (February 25, 2011)
- Aiko Graduation Trip Diary Angel Kiss (February 22, 2012)
- Aishū Cinema (June 20, 2012)

== Television ==
- The Non-fiction (Fuji TV, May 20, 2012)
