= Hosoya Station (Shizuoka) =

Railway station in Kakegawa, Shizuoka Prefecture, Japan

Coordinates: 34°47′34.09″N 137°57′41.63″E

Hosoya Station 細谷駅
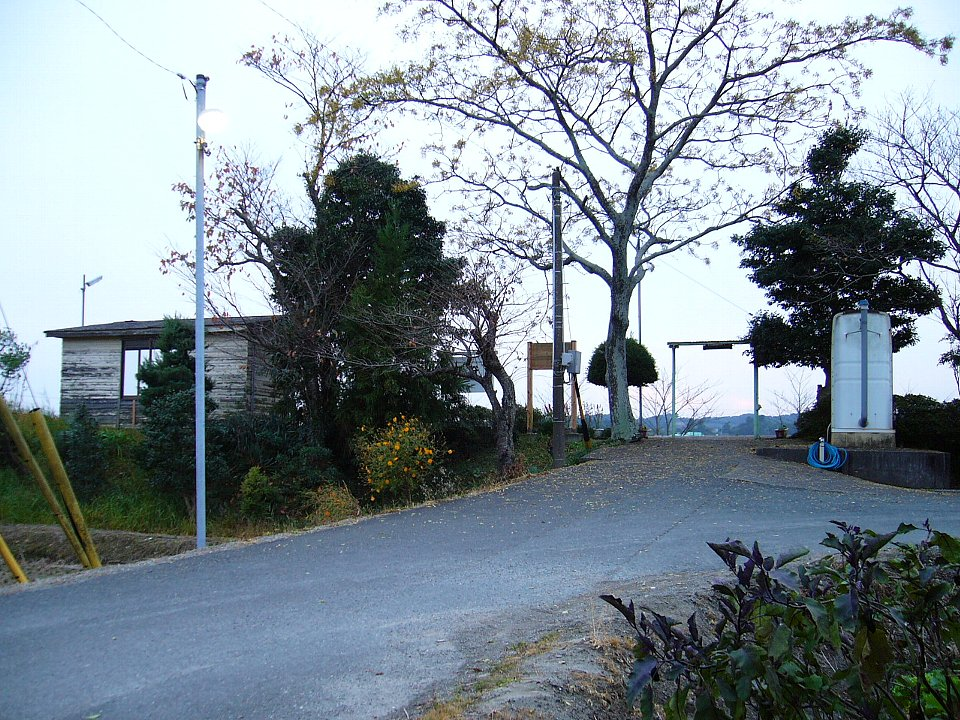
- Hosoya Station

General information
- Location: Hosoya, Kakegawa, Shizuoka （静岡県 掛川市細谷） Japan
- Operator: Tenryū Hamanako Railroad
- Line: Tenryū Hamanako Line

History
- Opened: 1956
Location

Hosoya Station (細谷駅, Hosoya-eki) is a train station on the Tenryū Hamanako Line in Kakegawa, Shizuoka Prefecture, Japan. It is 6 kilometers from the terminus of the line at Kakegawa Station.

== Station History ==
Hosoya Station was established on May 10, 1956, as a passenger station on the Japan National Railway Futamata Line. On March 15, 1987, the station came under the control of the Tenryū Hamanako Line.

== Lines ==
- Tenryū Hamanako Railroad
  - Tenryū Hamanako Line

== Layout ==
Hosoya Station is an unstaffed station with a single elevated side platform, and a small wooden waiting room.

== Adjacent stations ==
«	Service	»
Tenryū Hamanako Railroad
Tenryū Hamanako Line
Ikoinohiroba	-	Haranoya
