= Omaezaki =

Omaezaki 御前崎市
- City
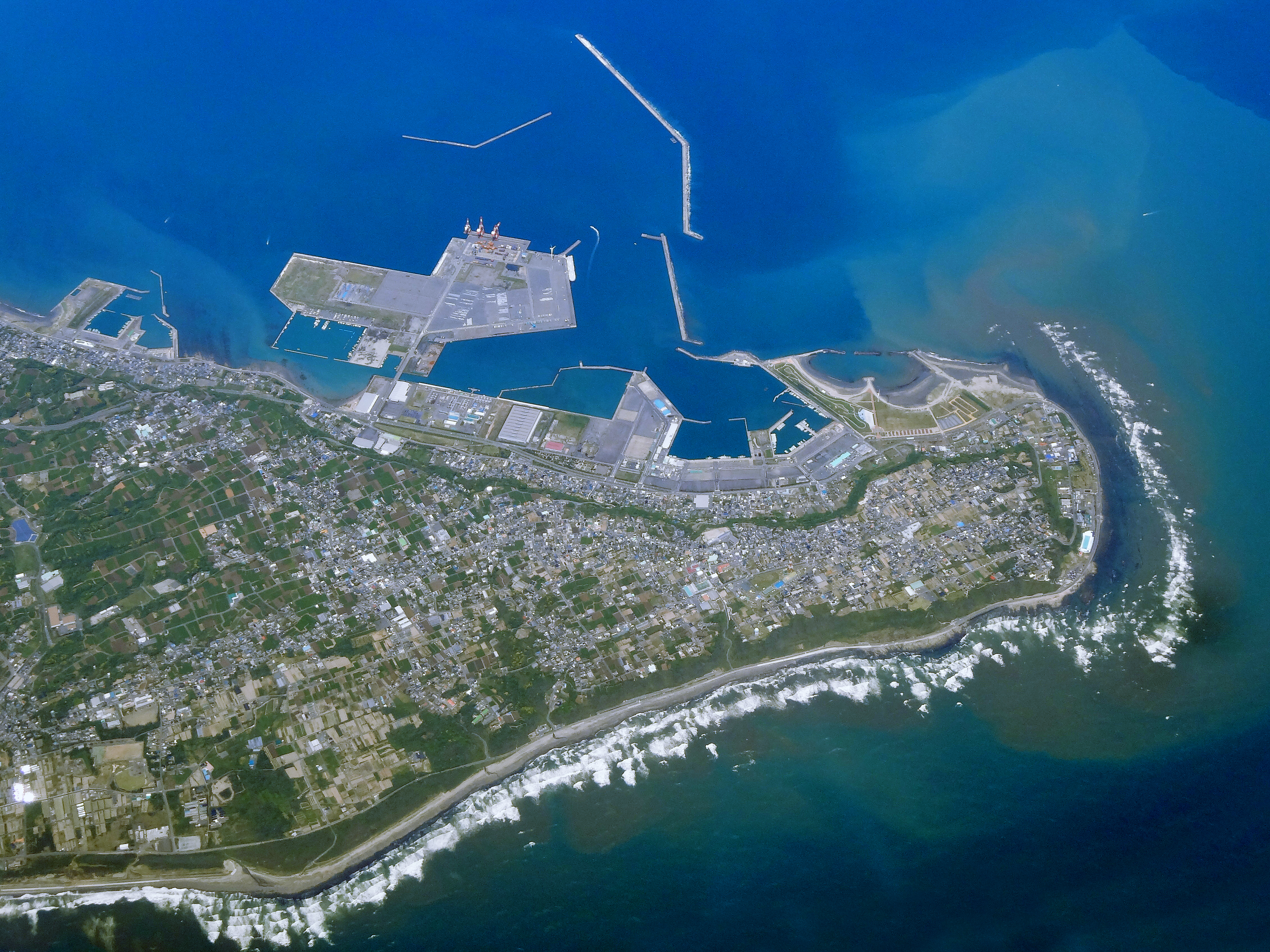
- Cape Omaezaki

- Flag Seal

- Location of Omaezaki in Shizuoka Prefecture

- Coordinates: 34°38′16.6″N 138°7′41.1″E
- Country: Japan
- Region: Chūbu (Tōkai)
- Prefecture: Shizuoka
- First official recorded: 531 AD (official)
- Town settled: March 31, 1955
- City settled: April 1, 2004

Government
  - Mayor: Masaru Shimomura (since April 2024)

Area
  - Total: 65.56 km^{2} (25.31 sq mi)

Population (July 31, 2019)
  - Total: 32,422
  - Density: 494.5/km^{2} (1,281/sq mi)
- Time zone: UTC+9 (Japan Standard Time)
- Phone number: 0537-85-1111
- Address: 5585, Ike-Shinden, Omaezaki-shi, Shizuoka-ken 437-1692
- Climate: Cfa
- Website: Official website
- Symbols
- Flower: Calystegia soldanella
- Tree: Myrica rubra

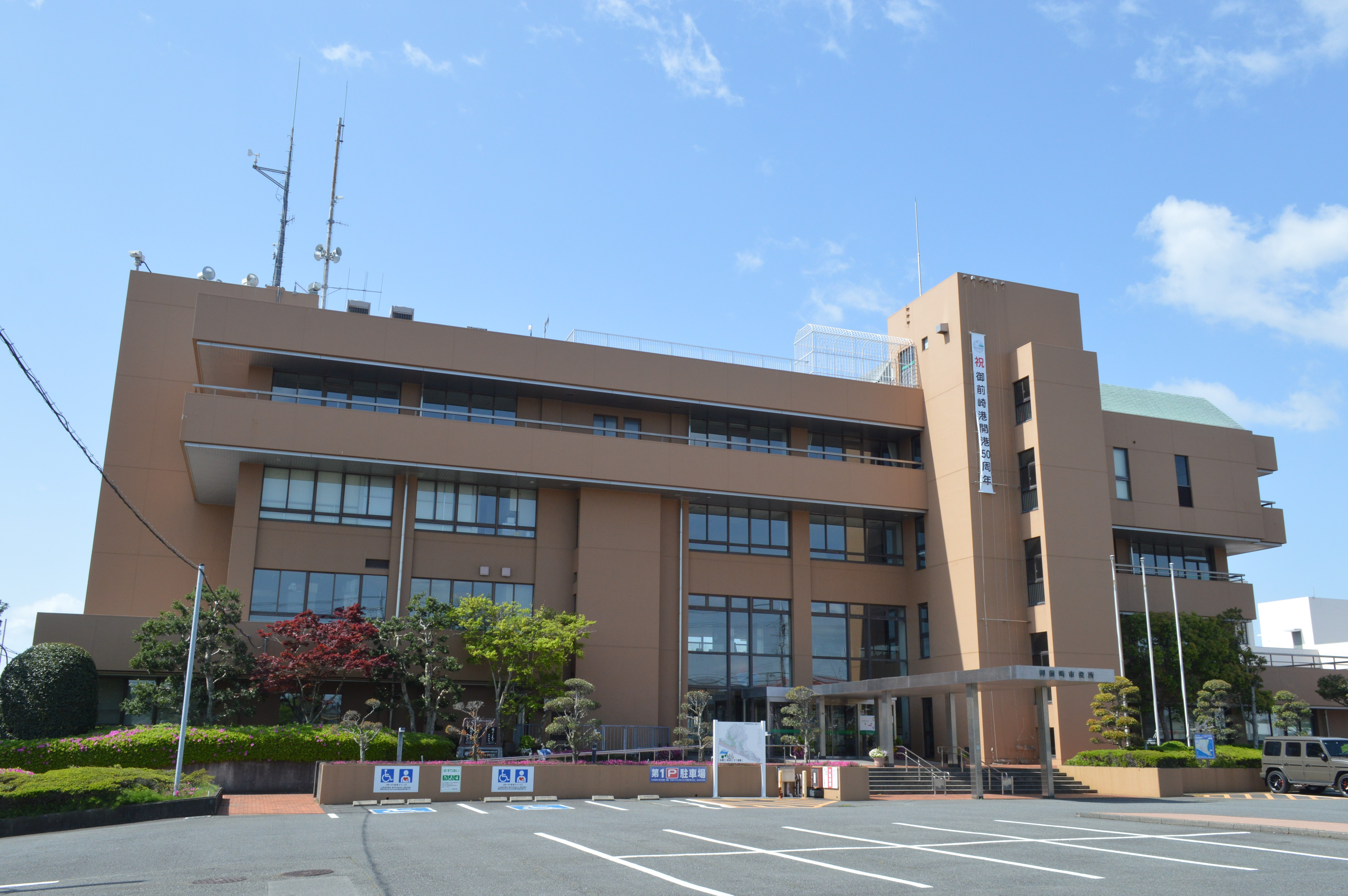
Omaezaki City Hall

Omaezaki (御前崎市, Omaezaki-shi; Japanese pronunciation: [ò̞.mä́.è̞.(d͡)zä̀.k̟ʲì, -é̞.(d͡)zä̀.k̟ʲì, -é̞.(d͡)zä́.k̟ʲi̥.ɕì]) is a city located in Shizuoka Prefecture, Japan. Omaezaki is located at the tip of Omaezaki Peninsula on Japan's Pacific coast. As of 31 July 2019, the city had an estimated population of 32,422 in 12,095 households and a population density of 490 persons per km^{2}. The total area of the city was 65.56 square kilometres (25.31 sq mi).

== Geography ==
Omaezaki City lies approximately 80 miles (130 km) south of Shizuoka City at the tip of a peninsula of the same name, stretching east into the Pacific Ocean. The majority of the city consists of gentle hills and valleys with some steep cliffs on the peninsula's east coast. Like much of Japan, Shizuoka Prefecture is an earthquake zone, and small tremors frequently occur in the area. Omaezaki is also in an area at risk from tsunami.

=== Surrounding municipalities ===
- Shizuoka Prefecture
  - Kakegawa
  - Kikugawa
  - Makinohara

=== Climate ===
Omaezaki has a humid subtropical climate (Köppen climate classification Cfa). Due to its location, Omaezaki experiences strong coastal winds between October and April. The Japanese rainy season also affects Omaezaki, with typhoons liable to hit the city between July and September. During summer, the region is cooler than the majority of inland Shizuoka Prefecture.The average annual temperature in Omaezaki is 16.7 °C (62.1 °F). The average annual rainfall is 2,094.8 mm (82.47 in) with September as the wettest month. The temperatures are highest on average in August, at around 26.7 °C (80.1 °F), and lowest in January, at around 6.9 °C (44.4 °F).

Climate data for Omaezaki (1991−2020 normals, extremes 1932−present)
Month	Jan	Feb	Mar	Apr	May	Jun	Jul	Aug	Sep	Oct	Nov	Dec	Year
Record high °C (°F)	19.2 (66.6)	22.8 (73.0)	23.5 (74.3)	25.5 (77.9)	27.6 (81.7)	31.6 (88.9)	36.7 (98.1)	36.4 (97.5)	33.7 (92.7)	30.1 (86.2)	26.1 (79.0)	22.6 (72.7)	36.7 (98.1)
Mean maximum °C (°F)	15.4 (59.7)	17.2 (63.0)	19.5 (67.1)	22.5 (72.5)	25.5 (77.9)	28.5 (83.3)	31.6 (88.9)	32.4 (90.3)	30.7 (87.3)	27.3 (81.1)	22.7 (72.9)	18.6 (65.5)	32.9 (91.2)
Mean daily maximum °C (°F)	10.7 (51.3)	11.5 (52.7)	14.4 (57.9)	18.3 (64.9)	21.9 (71.4)	24.4 (75.9)	27.9 (82.2)	29.8 (85.6)	27.4 (81.3)	23.0 (73.4)	18.2 (64.8)	13.1 (55.6)	20.1 (68.1)
Daily mean °C (°F)	6.9 (44.4)	7.5 (45.5)	10.5 (50.9)	14.7 (58.5)	18.6 (65.5)	21.5 (70.7)	25.0 (77.0)	26.7 (80.1)	24.4 (75.9)	19.9 (67.8)	14.8 (58.6)	9.4 (48.9)	16.7 (62.0)
Mean daily minimum °C (°F)	3.3 (37.9)	3.5 (38.3)	6.5 (43.7)	11.2 (52.2)	15.6 (60.1)	19.3 (66.7)	22.9 (73.2)	24.5 (76.1)	21.9 (71.4)	17.0 (62.6)	11.4 (52.5)	5.8 (42.4)	13.6 (56.4)
Mean minimum °C (°F)	−1.2 (29.8)	−1.0 (30.2)	0.8 (33.4)	4.5 (40.1)	11.3 (52.3)	15.6 (60.1)	19.8 (67.6)	21.5 (70.7)	17.7 (63.9)	11.1 (52.0)	5.3 (41.5)	0.5 (32.9)	−1.8 (28.8)
Record low °C (°F)	−5.4 (22.3)	−5.2 (22.6)	−3.2 (26.2)	−0.1 (31.8)	5.1 (41.2)	11.3 (52.3)	15.2 (59.4)	18.5 (65.3)	11.8 (53.2)	6.4 (43.5)	0.7 (33.3)	−3.5 (25.7)	−5.4 (22.3)
Average precipitation mm (inches)	78.7 (3.10)	105.4 (4.15)	167.5 (6.59)	200.9 (7.91)	213.4 (8.40)	257.0 (10.12)	221.6 (8.72)	146.6 (5.77)	237.5 (9.35)	255.7 (10.07)	134.3 (5.29)	76.2 (3.00)	2,094.8 (82.47)
Average snowfall cm (inches)	0 (0)	trace	0 (0)	0 (0)	0 (0)	0 (0)	0 (0)	0 (0)	0 (0)	0 (0)	0 (0)	0 (0)	trace
Average precipitation days (≥ 1.0 mm)	5.7	6.8	9.8	9.6	9.9	12.0	9.9	7.3	11.4	9.7	7.4	5.9	105.4
Average snowy days (≥ 1 cm)	0	0.1	0	0	0	0	0	0	0	0	0	0	0.1
Average relative humidity (%)	59	60	65	71	78	85	87	84	79	73	68	62	73
Mean monthly sunshine hours	204.1	187.9	198.2	201.2	203.4	148.4	188.0	237.1	174.2	162.3	171.4	196.6	2,272.8
Source: Japan Meteorological Agency

== Demographics ==
Per Japanese census data, the population of Omaezaki has fairly constant over the past 50 years.

Historical population
Year	Pop.	±%
1940	24,363	—
1950	29,721	+22.0%
1960	28,894	−2.8%
1970	27,402	−5.2%
1980	30,774	+12.3%
1990	34,237	+11.3%
2000	36,059	+5.3%
2010	34,700	−3.8%

== History ==
With the establishment of the modern municipalities system on April 1, 1889, the village of Omaezaki was created within Haibara District of Shizuoka Prefecture. It was elevated to town status on March 31, 1955. On April 1, 2004, Omaezaki merged with the town of Hamaoka (formerly of the now-defunct Ogasa District) to form the city of Omaezaki.

During the 2002 FIFA World Cup, the England national football team was based in former Hamaoka Town.

== Government ==
Omaezaki has a mayor-council form of government with a directly elected mayor and a unicameral city legislature of 16 members.

== Economy ==
Omaezaki has a long history of commercial fishing and of green tea cultivation and these continue to play a central role in the local economy. More recently, the Hamaoka Nuclear Power Plant situated in the former town of Hamaoka brought investment to the city; however, operations at the plant have been suspended from May 2011. Water sports account for a large number of visitors daily to the city, and during the summer months, tourism attracted by Omaezaki's beaches is an important part of the economy, and water sports made possible by strong coastal winds have become as much a part of Omaezaki's identity as that of a rural town.

== Education ==
Omaezaki has five public elementary schools and two public middle schools and one high public school operated by the city government, and one public high school operated by the Shizuoka Prefectural Board of Education. There is also one vocational training school.

== Transportation ==
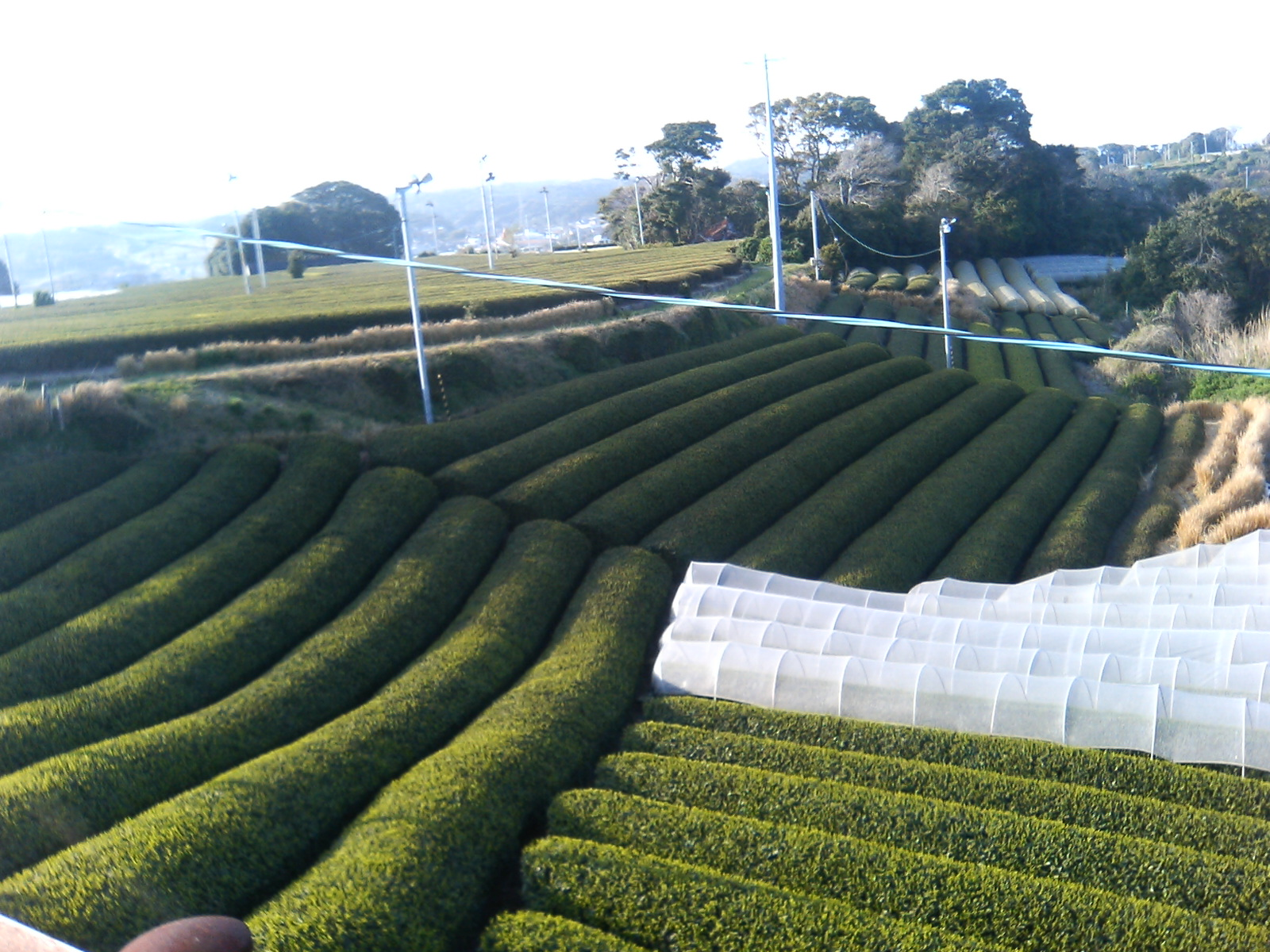
Tea fields in Omaezaki

=== Railway ===
Omaezaki does not have any passenger rail services.

=== Highway ===
- National Route 150

=== Seaports ===
- Port of Omaezaki

== Local attractions ==
Omaezaki City has long been famed for its Omaesaki Lighthouse and its extensive green tea fields. In recent years the Hamaoka Nuclear Power Plant, the visitor centre of which also hosts an Omnimax Cinema, has become a well-known local landmark. Due to the active seismic nature of the region, the nuclear power station has been built to a high level of safety, and its operator, Chubu Electric Power, claims that it can withstand strong tremors.

=== Culture ===
As a result of the strong coastal winds, Omaezaki offers some of the best windsurfing in Japan. As well as being Japan's most famous windsurfing spot, Omaezaki is renowned as a popular surfing and bodyboarding destination. This is especially true during the summer months, although surfers and bodyboarders can be seen all year round at Omaezaki Long Beach (御前崎ロングビーチ). The city also has a beach as part of Omaezaki Marine Park (御前崎マリーンパーク) which is a popular destination during the region's hot and humid summer months.

== Sister cities ==
- (Japan) Takamori, Nagano, since September 24, 2007
- Uljin County, North Gyeongsang, South Korea, since August 4, 2009
