= Otake Dainichi Nyorai =

Figure in Japanese Buddhist tradition

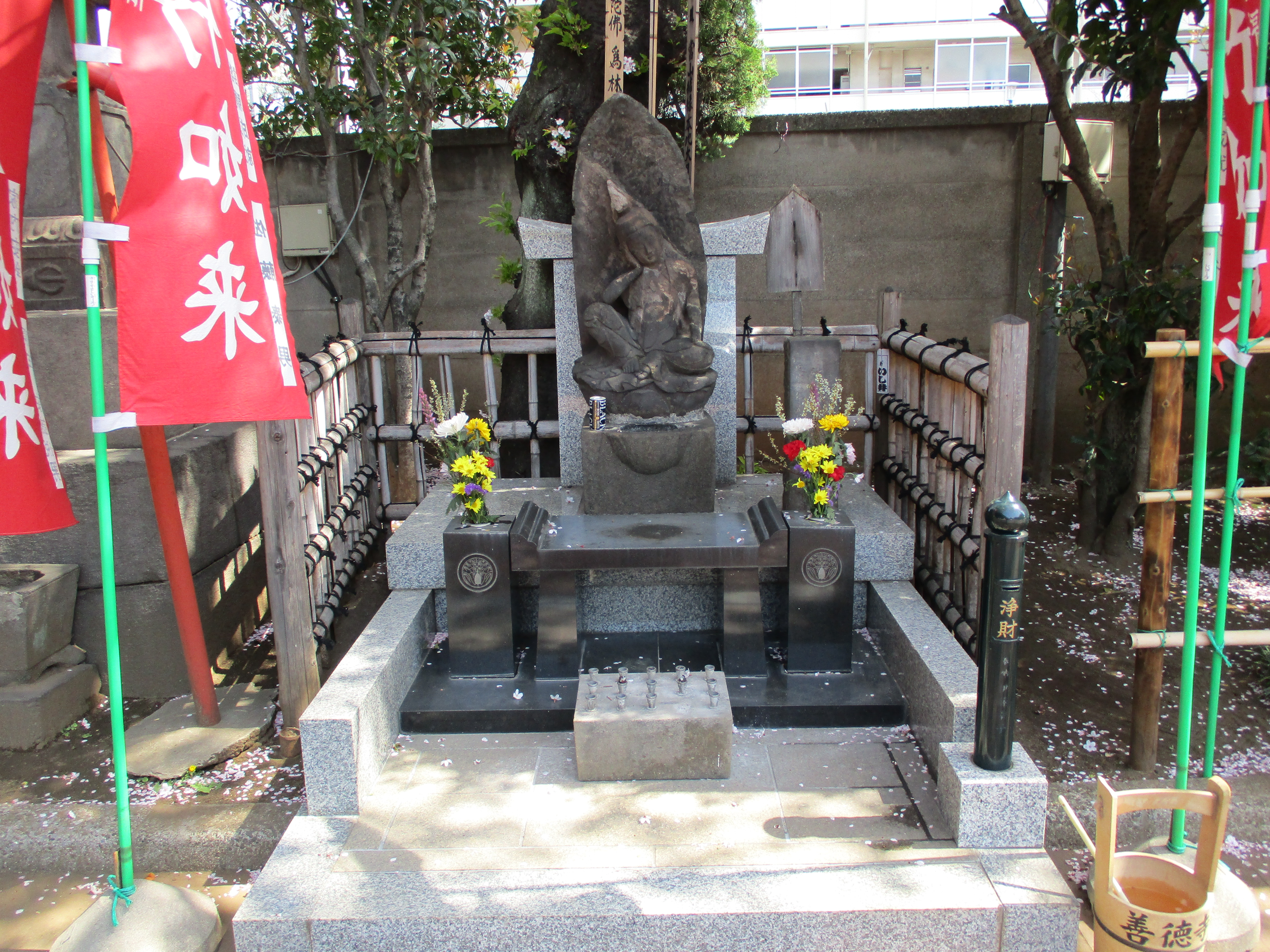
Otake dainichi grave

Otake Dainichi Nyorai (お竹大日如来 or 於竹大日如来), who is also known as Otake, is a figure in the Japanese Buddhist tradition. She was thought to be a reincarnation of Vairocana [Japanese : 毘盧遮那佛] in Japan. Otake's cult is also associated with the religious practice of Shugendo.

== Life ==
Take (or Takejo) lived in the early part of the 17th century. The common form of her name Otake derives from honorific speech [Japanese:bikago] with the prefix of adding on the letter O at the beginning for women a common practice in the Edo period.

Otake originated from Shonai in Yamagata , but ended up working as a maid-servant for the Sakuma family in Odenma-cho in Edo. The area situated in the Nihonbashi commercial district of central Edo, was the center of the city's dry-goods and textile trade, with merchant establishments dealing in silk fabrics and finished garments. Sakuma Zenpachi was the head of this family as well as the town-head of Odemna-cho. Due to her designation as a maid-servant [Japanese: gejo], Otake was most likely from the lower class and most of her work would have taken place in the kitchen.

Otake was a very religious woman of great Buddhist virtue. She gave all she had to the poor, ate hardly any food, and performed the most menial chores with extreme diligence. Otake would instead gather nourishment from scraps from the drain-board [Japanese: sunokoyuka (すのこ床) or mizuya 水屋]. (Note: A drain-board [Japanese: sunokoyuka (すのこ床) or mizuya 水屋] was a cooking implement in the kitchen made of slats of bamboo tied together with rope/cotton thread and through which waste water and scraps from cooking was disposed of through a drain.)

A group of Shugendo mountain ascetics, who were searching for the reincarnation of the Nyorai Buddha, found her. When Otake bent down to pick up a few grains of rice that had fallen on the floor, a halo-like light surrounded her, convincing the ascetics that they had come upon a divine being. Otake is often portrayed with an object behind her head that resembles a halo, or with a shadow or reflection identifying her as a buddha.

== Death ==
Otake is said to have died in 1638, while other sources put her year of death at June 15, 1680.

== Veneration ==
The Otake Dainichi-do shrine built to honour her memory Arasawaji-Shozen-in is said to have been built in 1666. Lady Keishōin (Japanese: 桂昌院) the mother of Tokugawa Iyeasu was a patron of the shrine and donated a wrapping cloth and a box.

It is believed that if you visited Otakes shrine at Shinko-in temple you would find good maids.

== Cultural depictions ==
Otake was depicted in satirical prints, with subjects such as kitchen implements pilgrimaging to worship Otake and playing ken with deities Okina Inari and Datsue-ba. The connection between the three deities were their association with clothing.
