= Kikugawa =

Kikugawa 菊川市
- City
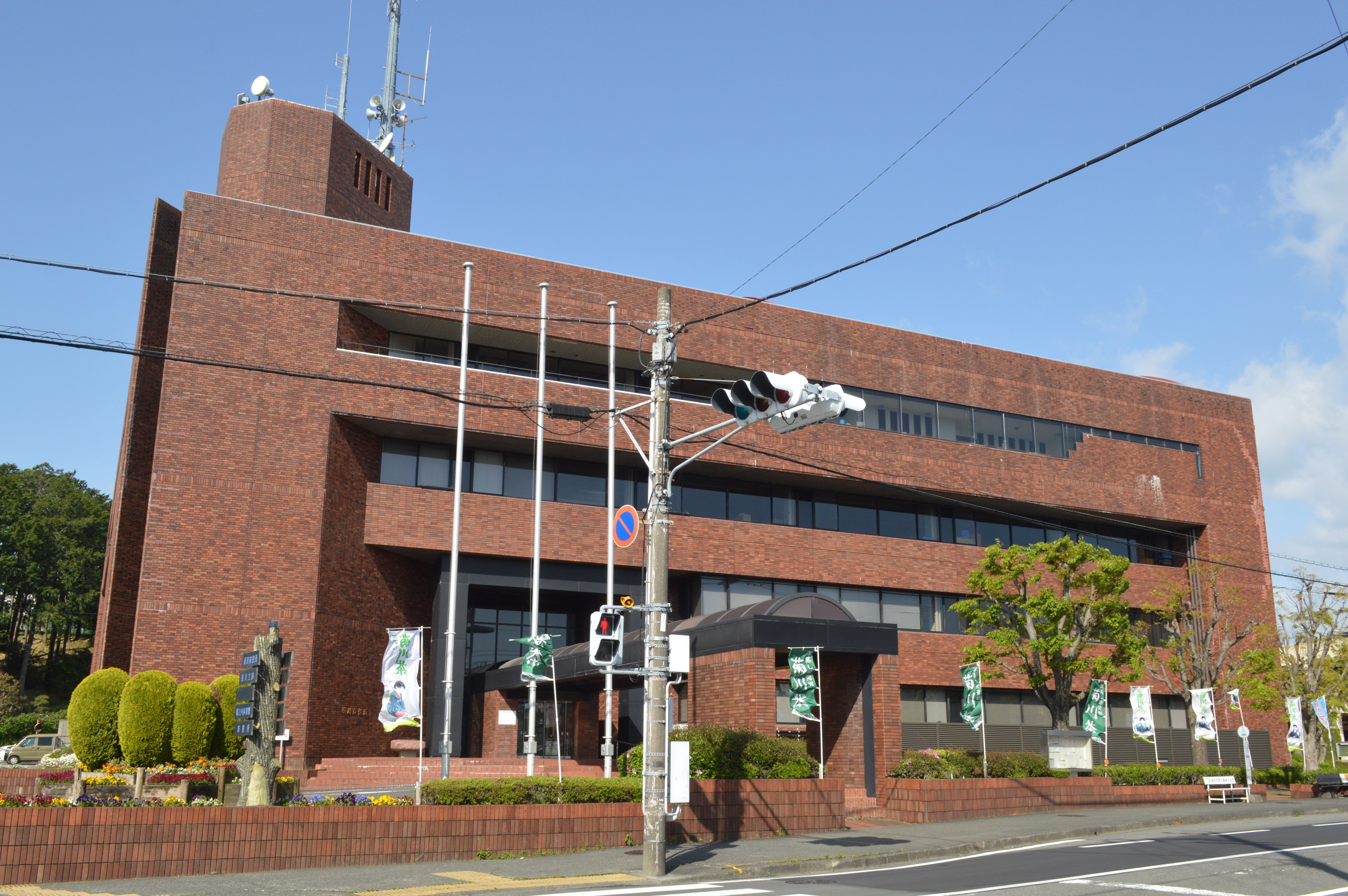
- Kikugawa City Hall

- Flag Emblem

- Location of Kikugawa in Shizuoka Prefecture

- Coordinates: 34°45′N 138°5′E
- Country: Japan
- Region: Chūbu (Tōkai)
- Prefecture: Shizuoka

Government
  - Mayor: Junichi Ota (since January 2005, and former Kikugawa leader since January 1997)

Area
  - Total: 94.19 km^{2} (36.37 sq mi)

Population (July 2019)
  - Total: 48,484
  - Density: 514.7/km^{2} (1,333/sq mi)
- Time zone: UTC+9 (Japan Standard Time)
- Phone number: 0537-35-2111
- Address: Horinouchi-61, Kikugawa-shi, Shizuoka-ken; 439-8650
- Climate: Cfa
- Website: Official website
- Symbols
- Bird: Grey wagtail
- Flower: Chrysanthemum
- Tree: Camellia sinensis

Kikugawa (菊川市, Kikugawa-shi) is a city located in the western portion of Shizuoka Prefecture, Japan. As of 28 February 2023, the city had an estimated population of 47,714 in 18,775 households, and a population density of 510 persons per km². The total area of the city is 94.19 square kilometres (36.37 sq mi). The city is known for production of green tea. The city's slogan is "Green for the Next Generation".

== Geography ==
Kikugawa is situated on the Makinohara Plateau of east-central Shizuoka. The Kikugawa River flows through the city. The area enjoys a warm maritime climate with hot, humid summers and mild, cool winters, and is subject to frequent fogs.

=== Surrounding municipalities ===
Shizuoka Prefecture

- Kakegawa
- Makinohara
- Omaezaki
- Shimada

=== Demographics ===
Per Japanese census data, the population of Kikugawa has been relatively steady over the past 30 years.

Historical population
Year	Pop.	±%
1940	29,899	—
1950	37,537	+25.5%
1960	36,941	−1.6%
1970	35,365	−4.3%
1980	38,081	+7.7%
1990	43,762	+14.9%
2000	47,036	+7.5%
2010	47,035	−0.0%

=== Climate ===
The city has a climate characterized by hot and humid summers, and relatively mild winters (Köppen climate classification Cfa). The average annual temperature in Kikugawa is 15.1 °C (59.2 °F). The average annual rainfall is 2,192.5 mm (86.32 in) with September as the wettest month. The temperatures are highest on average in August, at around 25.7 °C (78.3 °F), and lowest in January, at around 4.7 °C (40.5 °F).

Climate data for Kikugawa (1991−2020 normals, extremes 1978−present)
Month	Jan	Feb	Mar	Apr	May	Jun	Jul	Aug	Sep	Oct	Nov	Dec	Year
Record high °C (°F)	17.4 (63.3)	21.4 (70.5)	24.4 (75.9)	28.3 (82.9)	30.8 (87.4)	34.8 (94.6)	36.9 (98.4)	37.4 (99.3)	35.1 (95.2)	31.2 (88.2)	25.9 (78.6)	21.5 (70.7)	37.4 (99.3)
Mean daily maximum °C (°F)	9.8 (49.6)	10.9 (51.6)	14.0 (57.2)	18.7 (65.7)	22.6 (72.7)	25.2 (77.4)	28.9 (84.0)	30.1 (86.2)	26.8 (80.2)	22.0 (71.6)	17.2 (63.0)	12.0 (53.6)	19.8 (67.7)
Daily mean °C (°F)	4.7 (40.5)	5.5 (41.9)	8.7 (47.7)	13.5 (56.3)	17.7 (63.9)	20.9 (69.6)	24.6 (76.3)	25.7 (78.3)	22.7 (72.9)	17.8 (64.0)	12.5 (54.5)	7.1 (44.8)	15.1 (59.2)
Mean daily minimum °C (°F)	0.5 (32.9)	0.9 (33.6)	4.1 (39.4)	8.9 (48.0)	13.6 (56.5)	17.7 (63.9)	21.7 (71.1)	22.7 (72.9)	19.7 (67.5)	14.5 (58.1)	8.6 (47.5)	2.9 (37.2)	11.3 (52.4)
Record low °C (°F)	−5.9 (21.4)	−7.5 (18.5)	−4.7 (23.5)	−1.4 (29.5)	4.8 (40.6)	10.6 (51.1)	15.0 (59.0)	17.7 (63.9)	11.6 (52.9)	4.4 (39.9)	−0.7 (30.7)	−5.4 (22.3)	−7.5 (18.5)
Average precipitation mm (inches)	71.3 (2.81)	96.3 (3.79)	176.5 (6.95)	210.1 (8.27)	207.1 (8.15)	270.4 (10.65)	266.5 (10.49)	181.0 (7.13)	272.8 (10.74)	241.1 (9.49)	126.4 (4.98)	73.2 (2.88)	2,192.5 (86.32)
Average precipitation days (≥ 1.0 mm)	5.8	6.5	10.2	10.3	10.6	13.0	12.1	9.5	12.2	10.4	7.5	6.1	114.2
Mean monthly sunshine hours	209.3	188.5	194.5	198.0	195.5	136.6	167.3	216.6	158.8	162.7	175.4	201.8	2,209.6
Source: Japan Meteorological Agency

== History ==
With the establishment of the modern municipalities system of the early Meiji period on April 1, 1889, the area around modern Kikugawa was consolidated into eleven villages within Kitō District, Shizuoka Prefecture from 38 hamlets within former Tōtōmi Province. Kikugawa Station on the Tōkaidō Main Line train between Shizuoka and Hamamatsu opened on April 16, 1889 leading to an influx of population and development. Kitō District merged with neighboring Sano District to form Ogasa District, Shizuoka in 1896. Through the Taishō and Shōwa periods, Kikugawa developed as a center of green tea production and the tea trade. Kikugawa Town was created on January 1, 1954 through the merger of former Horinouchi Town with four surrounding villages.

The modern city of Kikugawa was established on January 17, 2005, from the merger of the former town of Kikugawa, absorbing the town of Ogasa (both from Ogasa District).

== Government ==
Kikugawa has a mayor-council form of government with a directly elected mayor and a unicameral city legislature of 17 members. The city contributes one member to the Shizuoka Prefectural Assembly.

== Economy ==
The economy of Kikugawa is primarily agricultural, with major crops including green tea, lettuce, blueberries, cantelope and aloe. Light industries include agricultural equipment manufacturing and automobile components manufacturing.

== Education ==
Kikugawa has nine public elementary schools and three public junior high schools operated by the city government, and one public high school operated by the Shizuoka Prefectural Board of Education. The city also have one private junior high school and two private high schools. The prefecture also operates a vocational school, the Shizuoka Prefectural Agriculture and Forestry College.

Kikugawa has three international schools:

- Centro Educacional Sorriso de Criança - Brazilian primary school
- Colégio Nippo-Objetivo de Kikugawa (Centro de Ensino Nippo-Brasileiro) - Brazilian primary school
- Escola Brasileira Sol Nascente - Brazilian primary school

== Transportation ==
=== Railway ===
- Central Japan Railway Company - Tōkaidō Main Line
  - Kikugawa Station

=== Highway ===
- Tōmei Expressway Kikugawa Interchange
- National Route 473

== Local attractions ==
- Kikugawa fortification ruins, a group of Sengoku-period ruins, National Historic Site
- Kuroda Daikan Yashiki, an Important Cultural Property

== Notable people from Kikugawa ==
- Yū Koyama - manga artist
- Miuna Saito - pop singer
- Kaduya Shinba - politician
