= Kakegawa, Shizuoka =

Kakegawa 掛川市
- City
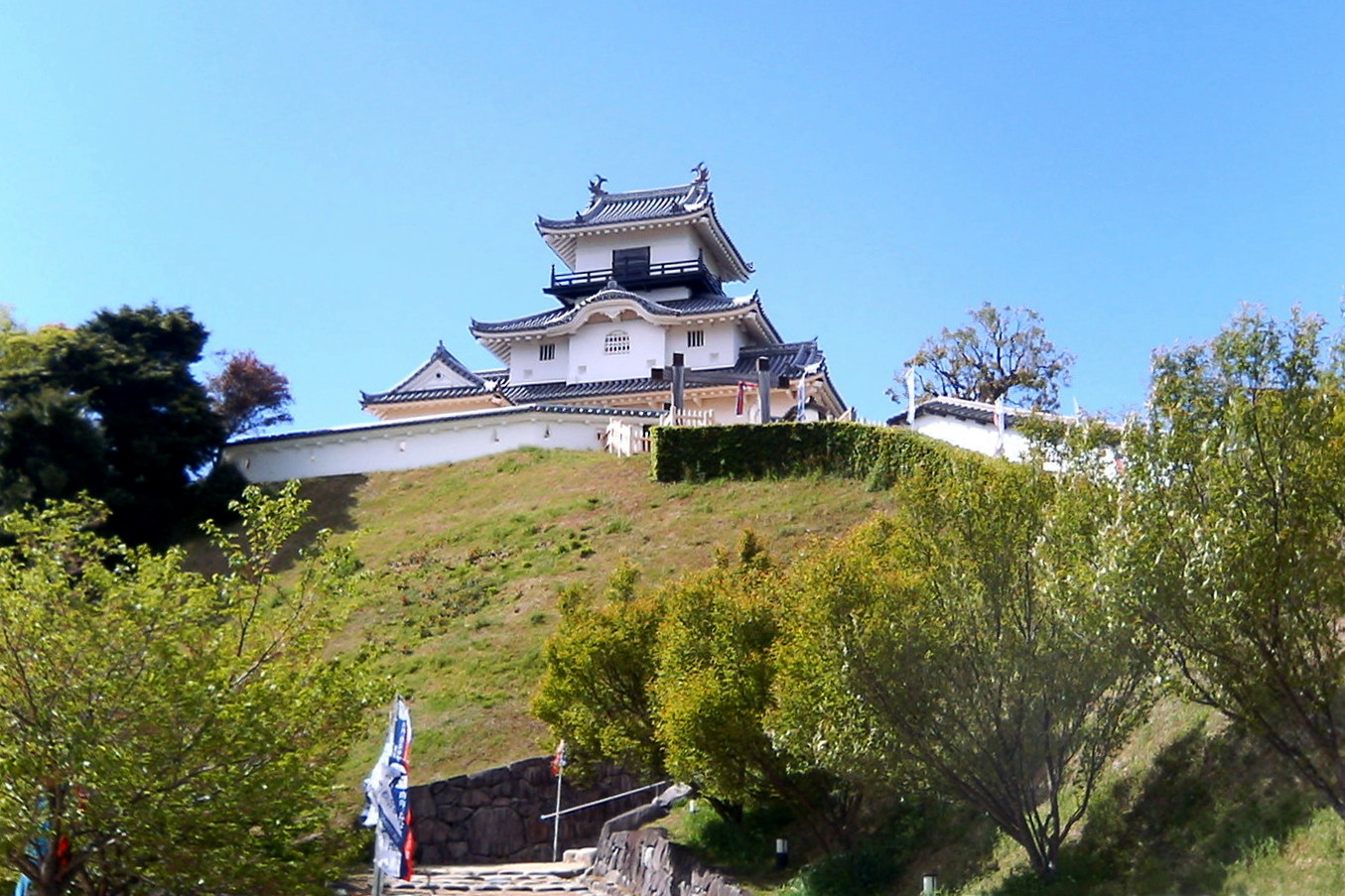
- Kakegawa Castle

- Flag Seal
- Interactive map of Kakegawa
- Coordinates: 34°46′7.3″N 137°59′54.3″E
- Country: Japan
- Region: Chūbu (Tōkai)
- Prefecture: Shizuoka

Government
  - – Mayor: Kubota Takashi (since 2020)

Area
  - Total: 265.69 km^{2} (102.58 sq mi)

Population (October 2019)
  - Total: 117,925
  - Density: 443.84/km^{2} (1,149.6/sq mi)
- Time zone: UTC+9 (Japan Standard Time)
- Symbols
  - Tree: Sweet osmanthus
  - Flower: Chinese bellflower
  - Bird: Japanese bush-warbler
- Phone number: 0537-21-1111
- Address: 1-1-1, Nagaya, Kakegawa-shi, Shizuoka-ken 436-8650
- Website: Official website

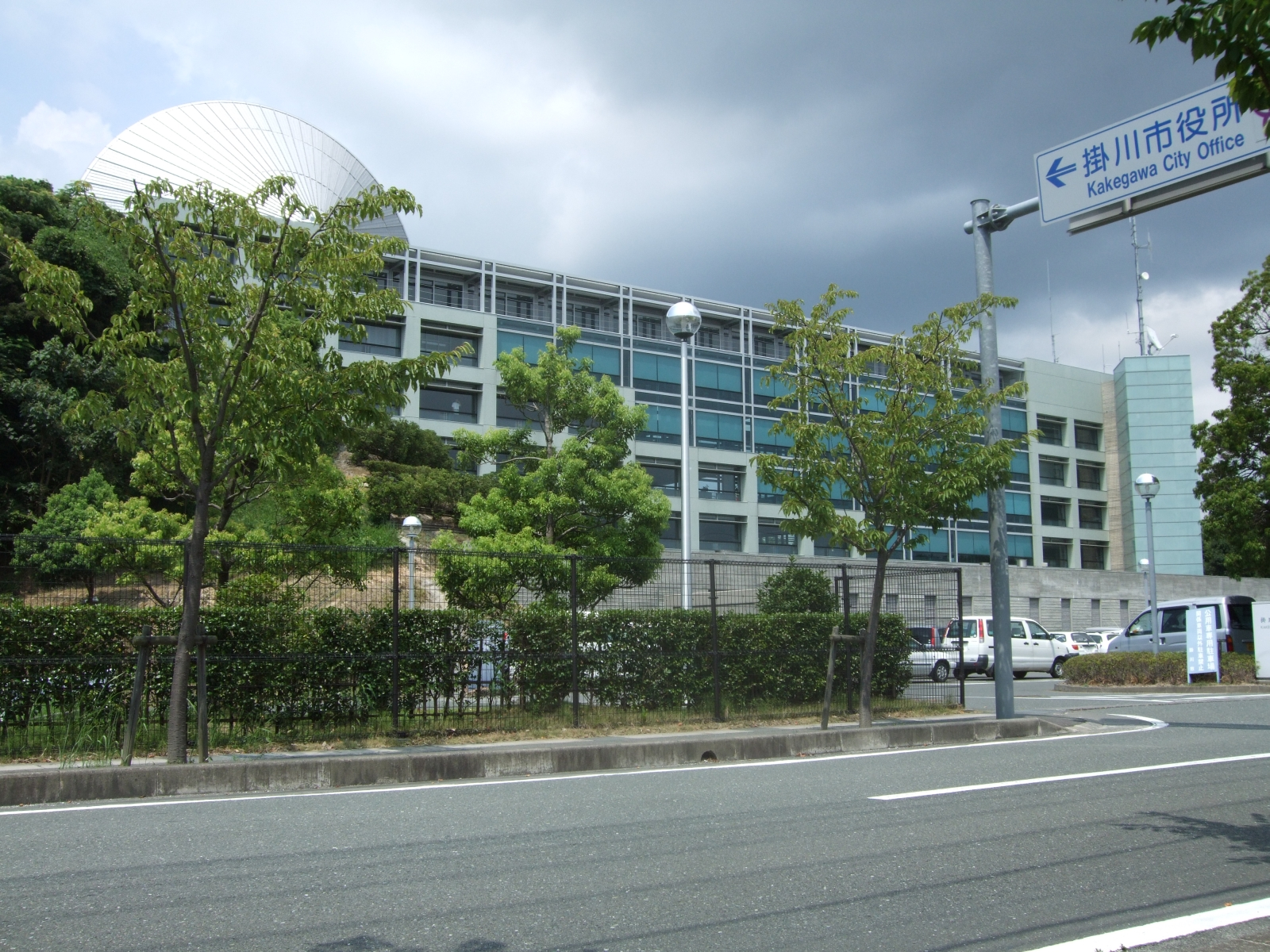
Kakegawa City Office

Kakegawa (掛川市, Kakegawa-shi) is a city in western Shizuoka Prefecture, Japan. As of 10 October 2019, the city had an estimated population of 117,925 in 45,519 households. The total area of the city is 265.69 square kilometres (102.58 sq mi).

== Geography ==
Kakegawa is in the coastal plains of southwest Shizuoka Prefecture. It is bordered to the south by the Pacific Ocean, and extends for approximately 30 kilometers north-south by 16 kilometers east-west.

=== Surrounding municipalities ===
- Shizuoka Prefecture
  - Fukuroi
  - Kikugawa
  - Mori
  - Omaezaki
  - Shimada

== Demographics ==
Like most of Japan, Kakegawa's population is almost exclusively Japanese. However, Kakegawa has a noticeable Nikkei (particularly, South American) population and it is more common to find signs written in Portuguese than in English.

Per Japanese census data, the population of Kakegawa has been increasing over the past 50 years.

Historical population
Year	Pop.	±%
1940		—
1950	38,938	—
1960	88,989	+128.5%
1970	86,113	−3.2%
1980	94,398	+9.6%
1990	105,030	+11.3%
2000	114,328	+8.9%
2010	116,373	+1.8%

=== Climate ===
The city has a climate characterized by hot and humid summers, and relatively mild winters (Köppen climate classification Cfa). The average annual temperature in Kakegawa is 16.1 °C. The average annual rainfall is 2100 mm with September as the wettest month. The temperatures are highest on average in August, at around 27.1 °C, and lowest in January, at around 5.8 °C.

== History ==
The Kakegawa area has been a regional commercial center within Tōtōmi Province since at least the Kamakura period, but developed as a castle town under the Imagawa clan, whose headquarters was in neighboring Suruga Province. Kakegawa Castle was built by Asahina Yasuhiro, a retainer of Imagawa Yoshitada, in the Bunmei era (1469–1487). The castle later fell into the hands of the Tokugawa clan, but was then given to Toyotomi clan retainer Yamauchi Kazutoyo in 1580. After the establishment of the Tokugawa shogunate, the Kakegawa Domain was created, and ruled by numerous fudai daimyō. The area prospered during the Edo period, as the Tōkaidō highway connecting Edo with Kyoto passed through Kakegawa, whose post stations included Nissaka-shuku and Kakegawa-juku. Neighboring Yokosuka Domain, a smaller fudai holding, was also located within what are now the city limits of Kakegawa.

After the Meiji Restoration, Kakegawa was made part of the short-lived Hamamatsu Prefecture in 1871, which merged with Shizuoka Prefecture in 1876. Kakegawa Town was created in the cadastral reform of April, 1891, four years after the opening of Kakegawa Station on what later became the Tōkaidō Main Line railway. The town expanded steadily over the years, annexing neighboring villages and towns in Ogasa District, and was elevated in status of that of a city in 1954.

On April 1, 2005, the towns of Daitō and Ōsuka (both from Ogasa District) were merged into Kakegawa.

== Government ==
Kakegawa has a mayor-council form of government with a directly elected mayor and a unicameral city legislature of 30 members.

== Economy ==
Kakegawa has a mixed economy. It serves as a regional commercial center for west-central Shizuoka Prefecture. In the agricultural sector, production and processing of green tea predominates. The city is surrounded by green tea fields and is known for its high quality tea. Other crops include cantaloupe, tomatoes, strawberries and roses. In terms of industrial production, Kakegawa has several light industry industrial complexes. Major products include telecommunications equipment and electronics, cosmetics, automotive components and musical instruments.

== Education ==
- Tokyo Women's Medical University - Kakegawa campus
- Kakegawa has 23 public elementary schools, and nine public middle schools operated by the city government and four public high schools operated by the Shizuoka Prefectural Board of Education. The prefecture also operates two special education schools for the handicapped. The city formerly hosted a Brazilian school, a primary school called Centro Educacional Sorriso de Criança.

== Transportation ==
=== Railway ===
- Central Japan Railway Company - Tōkaidō Main Line
  - Kakegawa
- Central Japan Railway Company - Tōkaidō Shinkansen
- Tenryū Hamanako Railroad Tenryū Hamanako Line
  - Kakegawa • Kakegawa-shiyakusho-mae • Nishi-Kakegawa • Sakuragi • Ikoinohiroba • Hosoya • Haranoya • Harada • Towata •

=== Highway ===
- Tōmei Expressway
- Shin-Tōmei Expressway
- National Route 1
- National Route 150

== Local attractions ==
- Ananaikyo headquarters
- Kakegawa Castle, located only a few hundred meters from Kakegawa Station
- Kakegawa Kacho-en, which hosts a large variety of bird and plant species in a greenhouse-enclosed private garden.
- Kotonomama Hachiman-gu, the ichinomiya of Tōtōmi Province.
- Takatenjin Castle ruins, a National Historic Site
- Wadaoka Kofun group, a National Historic Site
- Yokosuka Castle, a National Historic Site

== Sister cities ==
Kakegawa is twinned with:

- Corning, United States, since 1987
- Eugene, United States, since 1979
- Hoengseong County, South Korea, since 2001
- Ōshū, Japan, since 1985
- Pesaro, Italy, since 2019
- Rize, Turkey, since 2015

== Notable people ==
- Hajime Moriyasu, former professional football player, current manager of the Japan national football team
- Hiroshi Suzuki, professional baseball player
- Ichiki Kitokurō, politician
- Keiko Sugiura, Paralympic cyclist
- Kenya Matsui, professional football player
- Satoru Mizushima, filmmaker
- Shingo Suzuki, mixed martial artist and Professional wrestler
- Shunpei Uto, Olympic swimmer
- Yayoi Yoshioka, physician, educator
- Yoshinobu Ishikawa, politician
- Yukie Osumi, metalsmith and Living National Treasure of Japan
