= List of mergers in Toyama Prefecture =

Here is a list of mergers in Toyama Prefecture, Japan from the Heisei period onward.

== Mergers from April 1, 1999 to present ==
- On November 1, 2004 - The town of Shogawa (from Higashitonami District) was merged into the expanded city of Tonami.
- On November 1, 2004 - The towns of Fukuno, Inami and Jōhana, the villages of Inokuchi, Kamitaira, Taira and Toga (all from Higashitonami District), and the town of Fukumitsu (from Nishitonami District) were merged to create the city of Nanto. Higashitonami District was dissolved as a result of this merger.
- On April 1, 2005 - the towns of Ōsawano and Ōyama (both from Kaminiikawa District), the towns of Fuchū and Yatsuo, and the villages of Hosoiri and Yamada (all from Nei District) were merged into the expanded city of Toyama. Kaminiikawa District and Nei District were both dissolved as a result of this merger.
- On November 1, 2005 - The city of Shinminato was merged with the towns of Daimon, Kosugi and Ōshima, and the village of Shimo (all from Imizu District) to create the city of Imizu. Imizu District was dissolved as a result of this merger.
- On November 1, 2005 - The town of Fukuoka (from Nishitonami District) was merged into the expanded city of Takaoka. Nishitonami District was dissolved as a result of this merger.
- On March 31, 2006 - The town of Unazuki (from Shimoniikawa District) was merged into the expanded city of Kurobe.
