= Japanese lacquerware =

Japanese craft using lacquer to coat objects

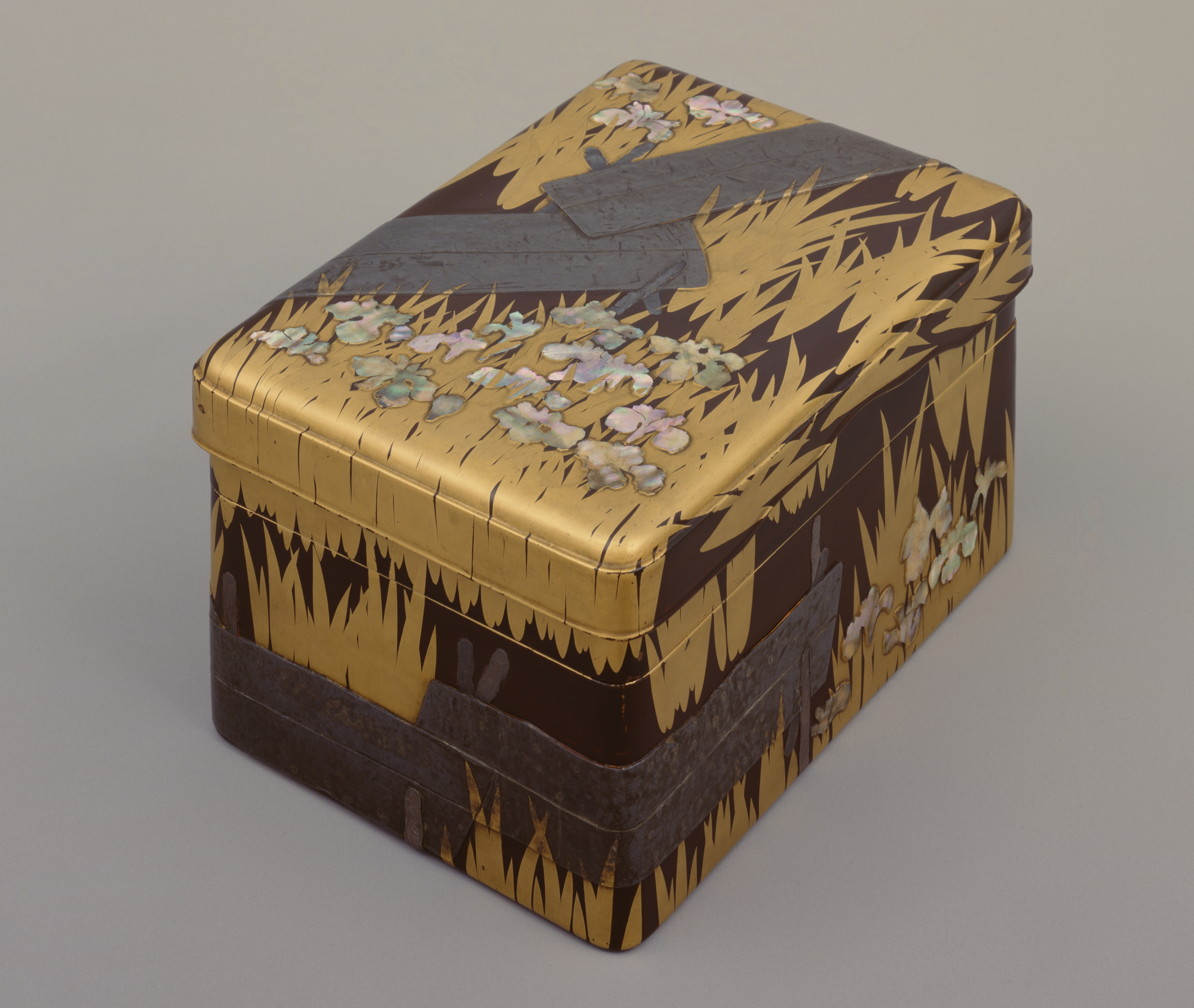
Writing lacquer box with Irises at Yatsuhashi, by Ogata Kōrin, Edo period (National Treasure)

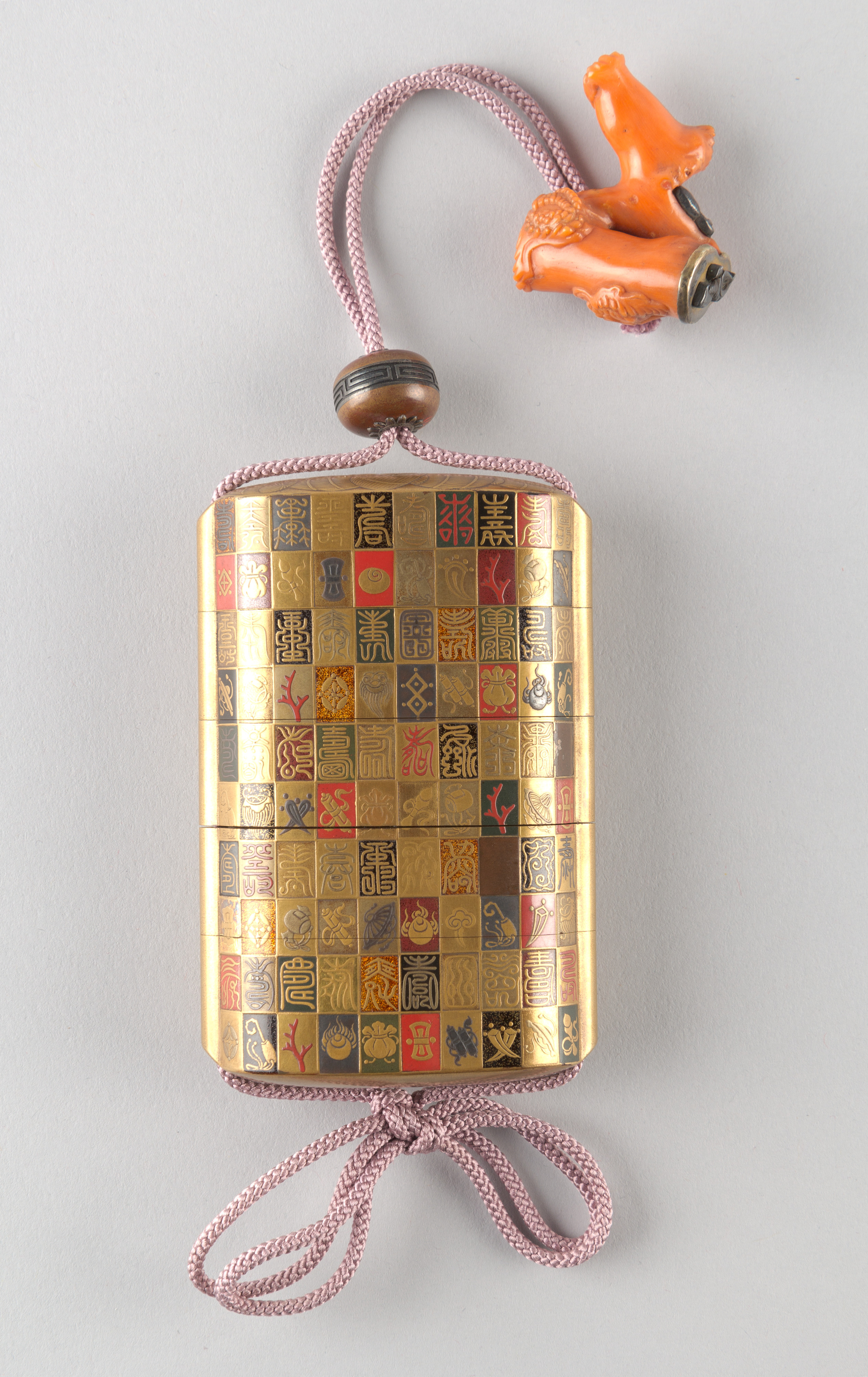
Inro in maki-e lacquer, Edo period, 18th century

Japanese Lacquerware (日本漆器, shikki) is a Japanese craft with a wide range of fine and decorative arts, as lacquer has been used in urushi-e, prints, and on a wide variety of objects from Buddha statues to bento boxes for food.

The characteristic of Japanese lacquerware is the diversity of lacquerware using a decoration technique called maki-e (蒔絵) in which metal powder is sprinkled to attach to lacquer. The invention of various maki-e techniques in Japanese history expanded artistic expression, and various tools and works of art such as inro are highly decorative.

A number of terms are used in Japanese to refer to lacquerware. Shikki (漆器) means "lacquer ware" in the most literal sense, while nurimono (塗物) means "coated things", and urushi-nuri (漆塗) means "lacquer coating."

The terms related to lacquer or lacquerware such as "Japanning", "Urushiol" and "maque" which means lacquer in Mexican Spanish, are derived from Japanese lacquerware.

== History ==
=== Jōmon－Edo period ===
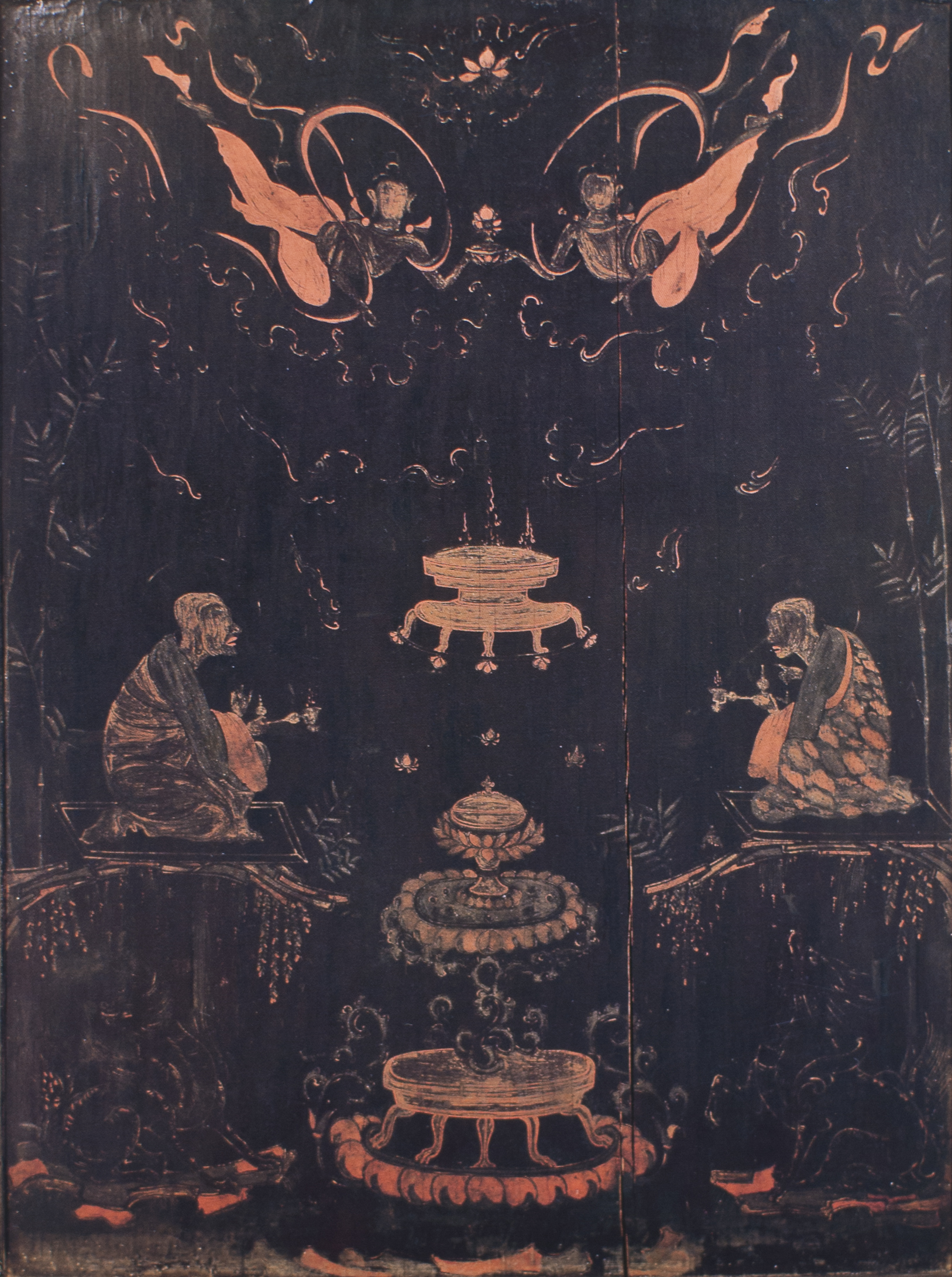
Detailed view of a lacquer panel of the Tamamushi Shrine from the Asuka period, 7th century (National Treasure)

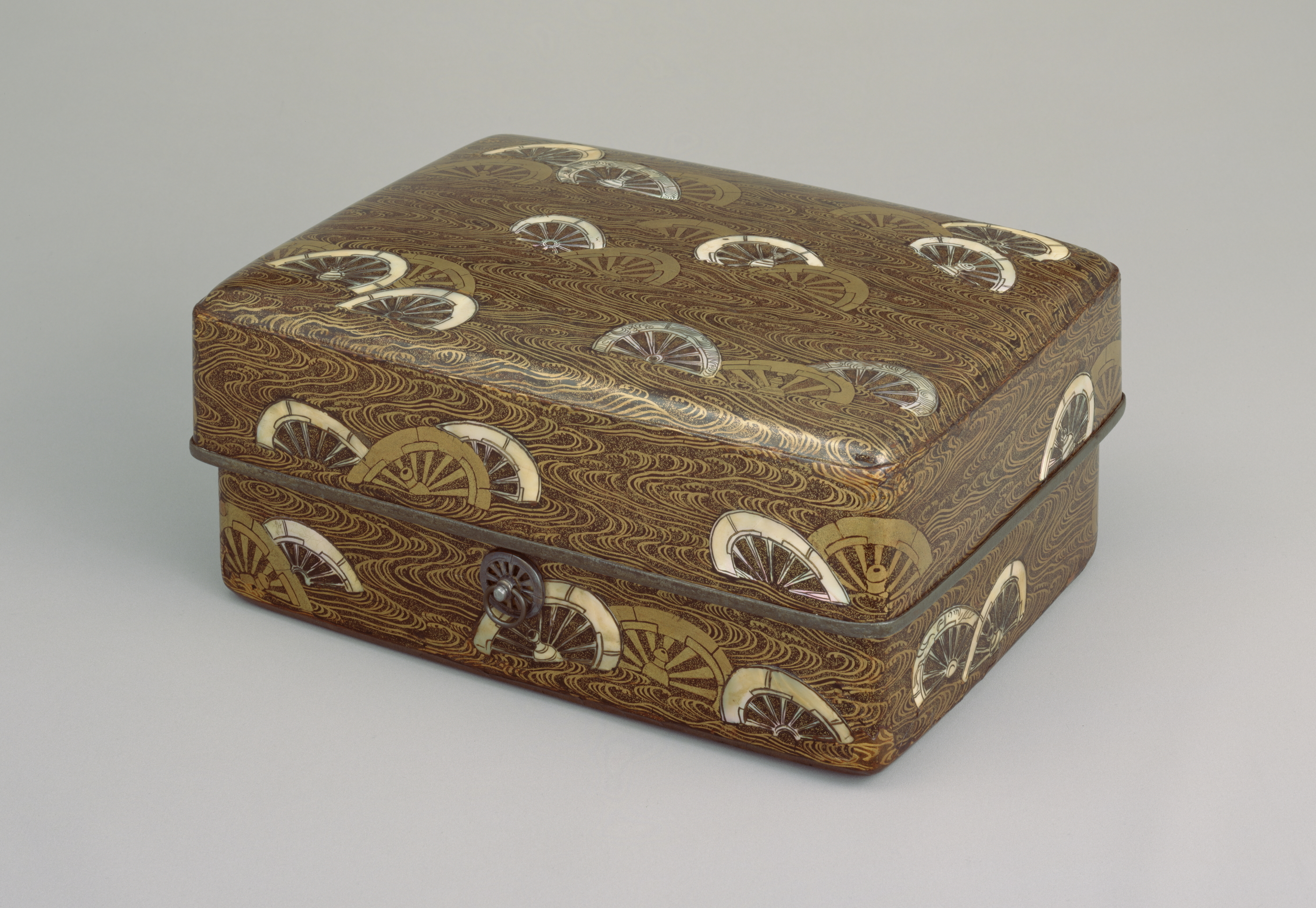
Tebako (Cosmetic box) Design of wheels-in-stream in maki-e lacquer and mother-of-pearl inlay, Heian period, 12th century, National Treasure

A Japanese lacquerware produced and exported at the request of the Society of Jesus. Azuchi–Momoyama period, 16th century, Kyushu National Museum

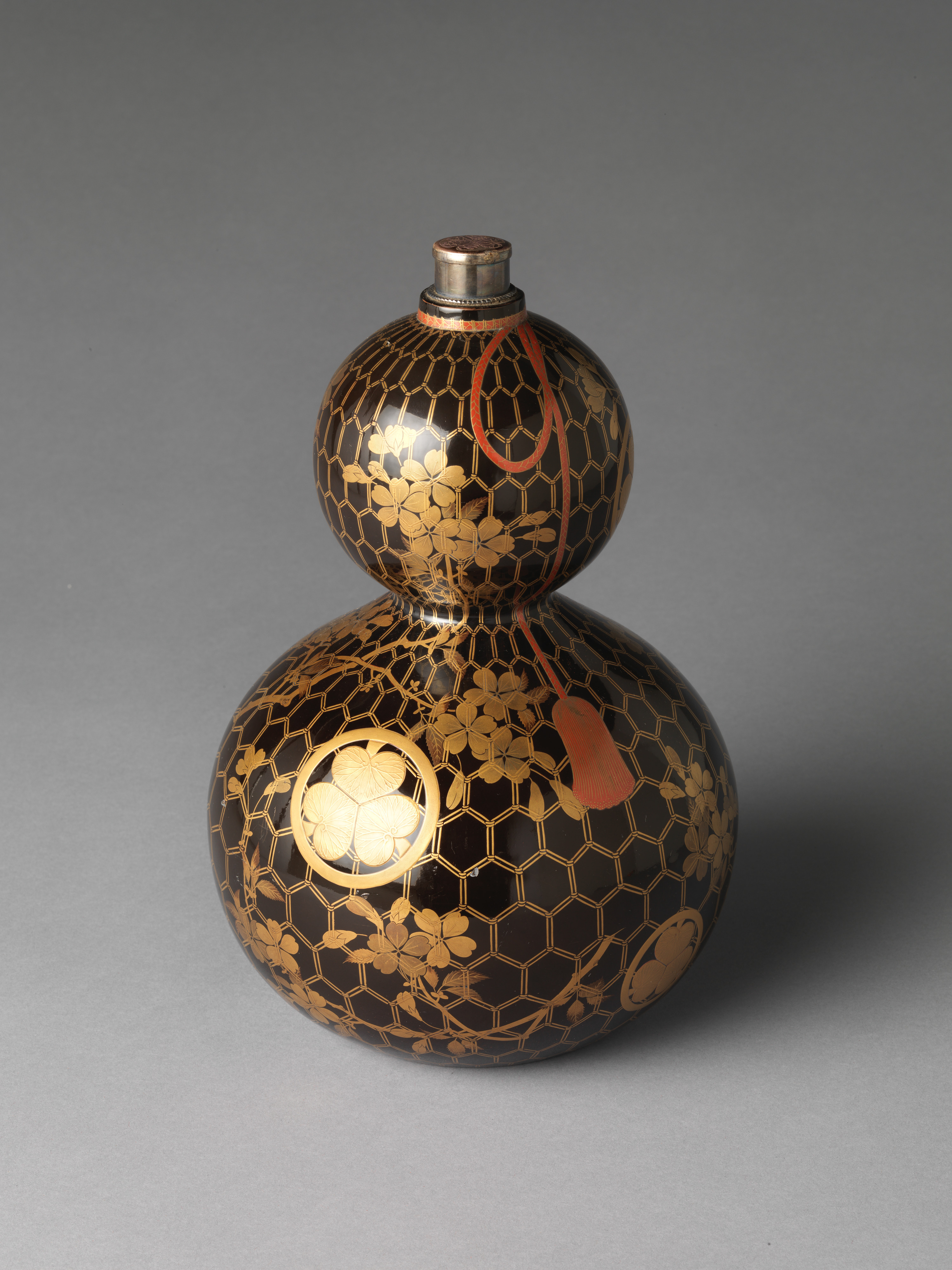
Maki-e sake bottle with Tokugawa clan's mon (emblem), Edo period, 18th century

It has been confirmed that the lacquer tree existed in Japan from 12,600 years ago in the incipient Jōmon period. This was confirmed by radioactive carbon dating of the lacquer tree found at the Torihama shell mound, and is the oldest lacquer tree in the world found as of 2011. Lacquer was used in Japan as early as 7000 BCE, during the Jōmon period. Evidence for the earliest lacquerware was discovered at the Kakinoshima "B" Excavation Site in Hokkaido. The ornaments woven with lacquered red thread were discovered in a pit grave dating from the first half of the Initial Jōmon period. Also, at Kakinoshima "A" Excavation Site, earthenware with a spout painted with vermilion lacquer, which was made 3200 years ago, was found almost completely intact.

Lacquering technology may have been invented by the Jōmon. They learned to refine urushi (poison oak sap) – the process taking several months. Iron oxide (colcothar) and cinnabar (mercury sulfide) were used for producing red lacquer. Lacquer was used both on pottery, and on different types of wooden items. In some cases, burial clothes for the dead were also lacquered. Many lacquered objects have turned up during the Early Jōmon period; this indicates that this was an established part of Jōmon culture. Experts are divided on whether Jōmon lacquer was derived from Chinese techniques, or invented independently. For example, Mark Hudson believes that "Jomon lacquer technology was developed independently in Japan rather than being introduced from China as once believed".

One of the masterpieces of ancient Japanese lacquer objects is the Tamamushi Shrine from middle of the seventh century AD. The shrine is made of lacquered hinoki or Japanese cypress and camphor wood, both native species. While commonly referred to as urushi, since the Meiji period some scholars have argued instead that the paintings employ the technique known as mitsuda-e, an early type of oil painting, using perilla (shiso) oil with litharge as a desiccant.

Many traditional crafts and industrial arts produced throughout Japanese history were initially influenced by China, and afterward experienced various native stylistic influences and innovations over the centuries.

In the Heian period (794–1185), various maki-e techniques characteristic of Japanese lacquerware were developed. While the method of drawing designs with a brush by dissolving gold powder in lacquer is a common technique in other countries, the method of drawing designs with lacquer and then sprinkling gold, silver, or copper powder of various sizes and shapes on top to polish them was developed in Japan. This made it possible to make the gold and silver of lacquerware brighter than before. Togidashi maki-e, a kind of maki-e, was developed and completed in this period. And hira maki-e was developed in the latter half of this period.

In the Kamakura period (1185–1333), carved lacquer from the Song dynasty of China was imported to Japan. However, many Japanese lacquer craftsmen did not adopt the Chinese method of depositing lacquer and then carving it; instead, they created Kamakurabori, a method of carving wood and then coating lacquer. During this period, Hira maki-e was completed and taka maki-e was newly developed.

In the Muromachi period (1336–1573), shishiai-togidashi maki-e, the most complicated of the typical maki-e techniques, was developed, as well as new taka maki-e techniques using grinding stones and clay powders. Japanese lacquerware was abundantly exported to neighboring East Asia, Southeast Asia and even India. Lacquer (particularly Japanese) was known at Indian courts and featured among the gifts offered by Europeans to local rulers. Japanese lacquer was well known to Sir Thomas Roe, for example, as a suitable type of gift to the emperor Jahangir, and he notes in 1616 that rarities from China and Japan were highly desirable in India.

In China, the Ming and Qing rulers generally described Japanese lacquerwares as "foreign lacquer" (yangqi). Yang Ming, and famous lacquer man Zhejiang, made annotations for A Record of Decoration with Lacquer, ... People of the Ming Dynasty once recorded: “The decoration art with lacquer coated with gold originated (maki-e) from Japan". Yang in the reign of Xuande of the Ming dynasty made a trip to Japan to study Japanese techniques, and a Japanese visited a Chinese imperial workshop in Beijing during the Ming dynasty. It is well documented that the Yongzheng Emperor had a formidable interest in Japanese lacquer, yangqi, and this was reflected in many of the works produced in the Imperial workshops during his reign.

In the Azuchi-Momoyama period (1568–1600) also made its way into Colonial Mexico (Manila Galleons) and Europe by Nanban trade. Japanese lacquerware attracted European aristocrats and missionaries from Europe, and western style chests and church furniture were exported in response to their requests. In this period, hira maki-e became very popular because of mass production.

The Edo period (1603–1868) saw an increase in the focused cultivation of lacquer trees and the development of the techniques used. In the 18th century colored lacquers came into wider use. With the development of economy and culture, the artistic quality of lacquered furniture has improved. Hon'ami Kōetsu and Ogata Kōrin brought the designs of the Rinpa school of painting into lacquerware. From the middle of the Edo period, Inro became popular as men's accessories, and wealthy merchants of the chōnin class and samurai class collected inro of high aesthetic value, precisely designed with lacquer. Marie Antoinette and Maria Theresa are known collectors of Japanese lacquerware and their collections are now often exhibited in the Louvre and the Palace of Versailles. During this period, due to the development of the economy, shishiai-togidashi maki-e, an advanced technique, became popular.

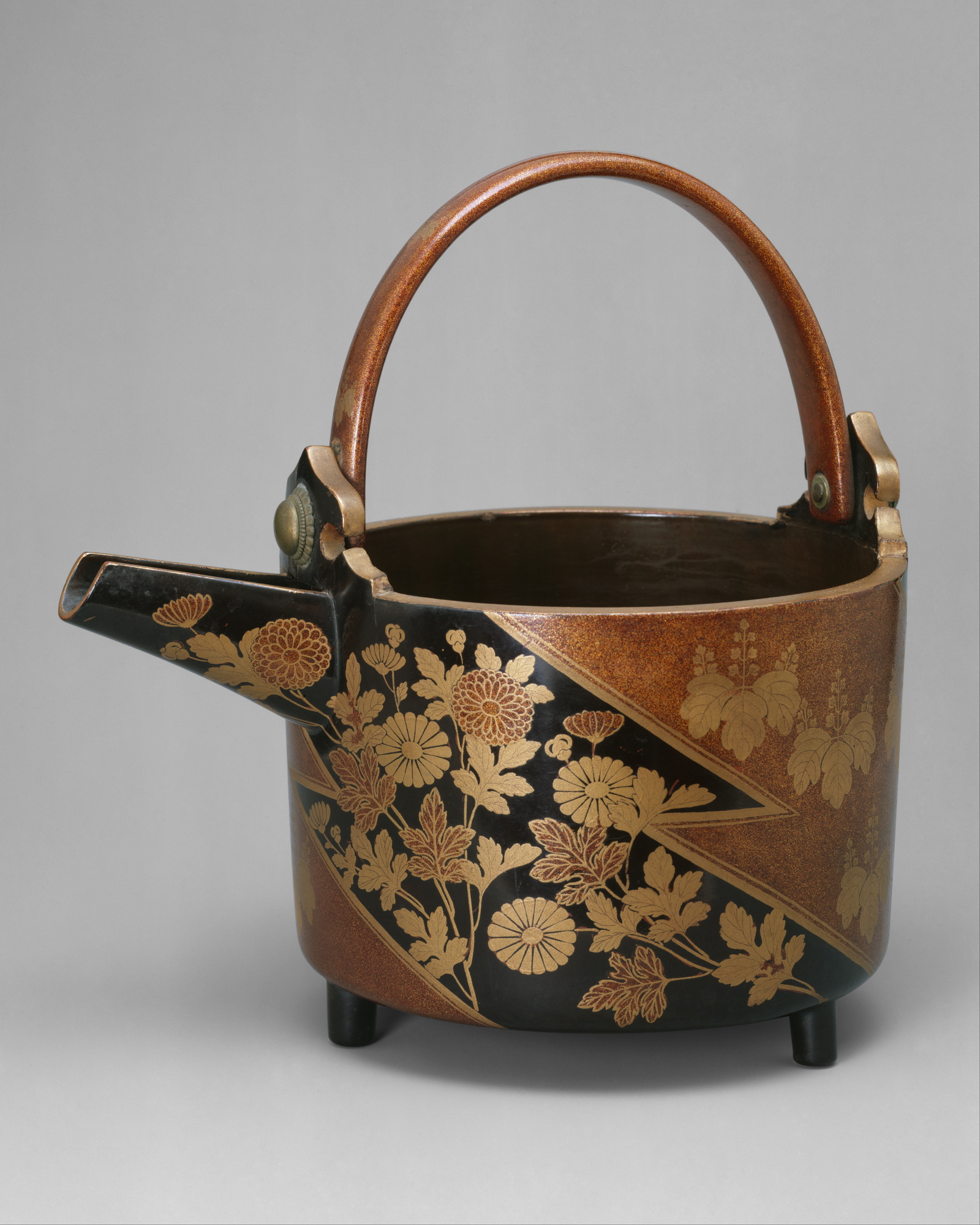
Sake Ewer with Chrysanthemums and Paulownia Crests in Alternating Fields. Early 17th century, Azuchi–Momoyama period

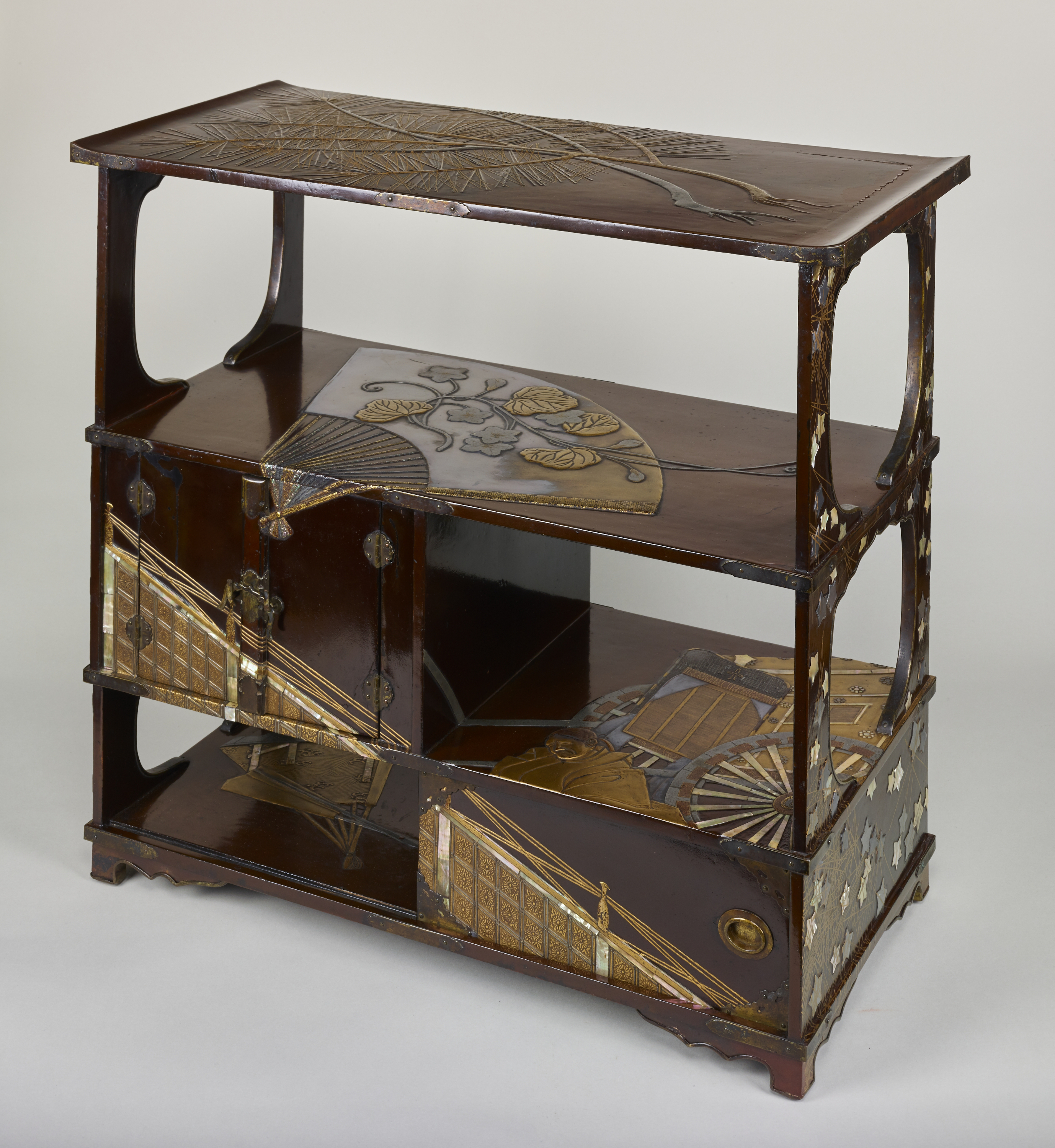
Tiered Stand with Designs Alluding to The Tale of Genji, by Hon'ami Kōetsu, Edo oeriod, 17th century

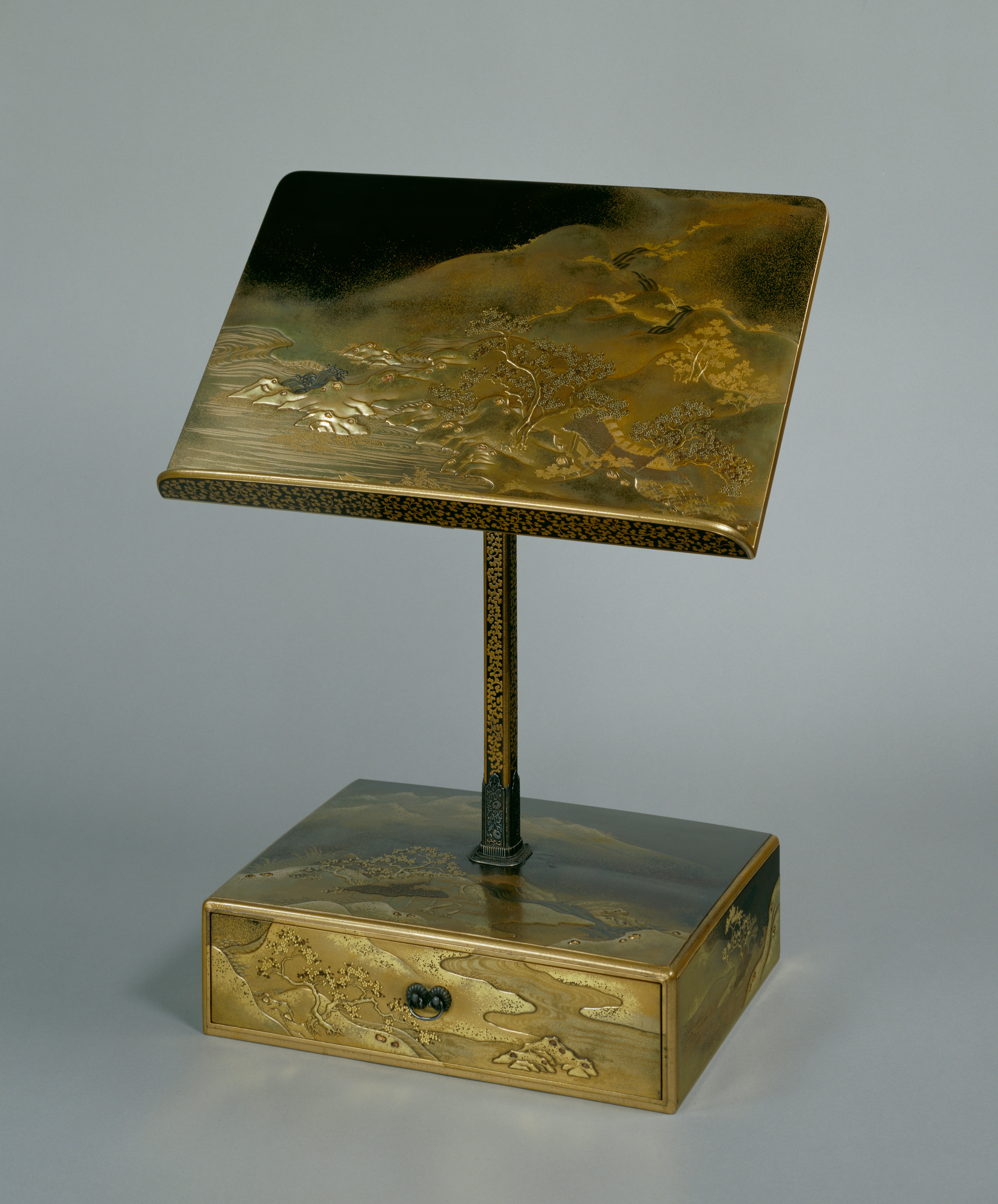
Reading Stand with Mount Yoshino

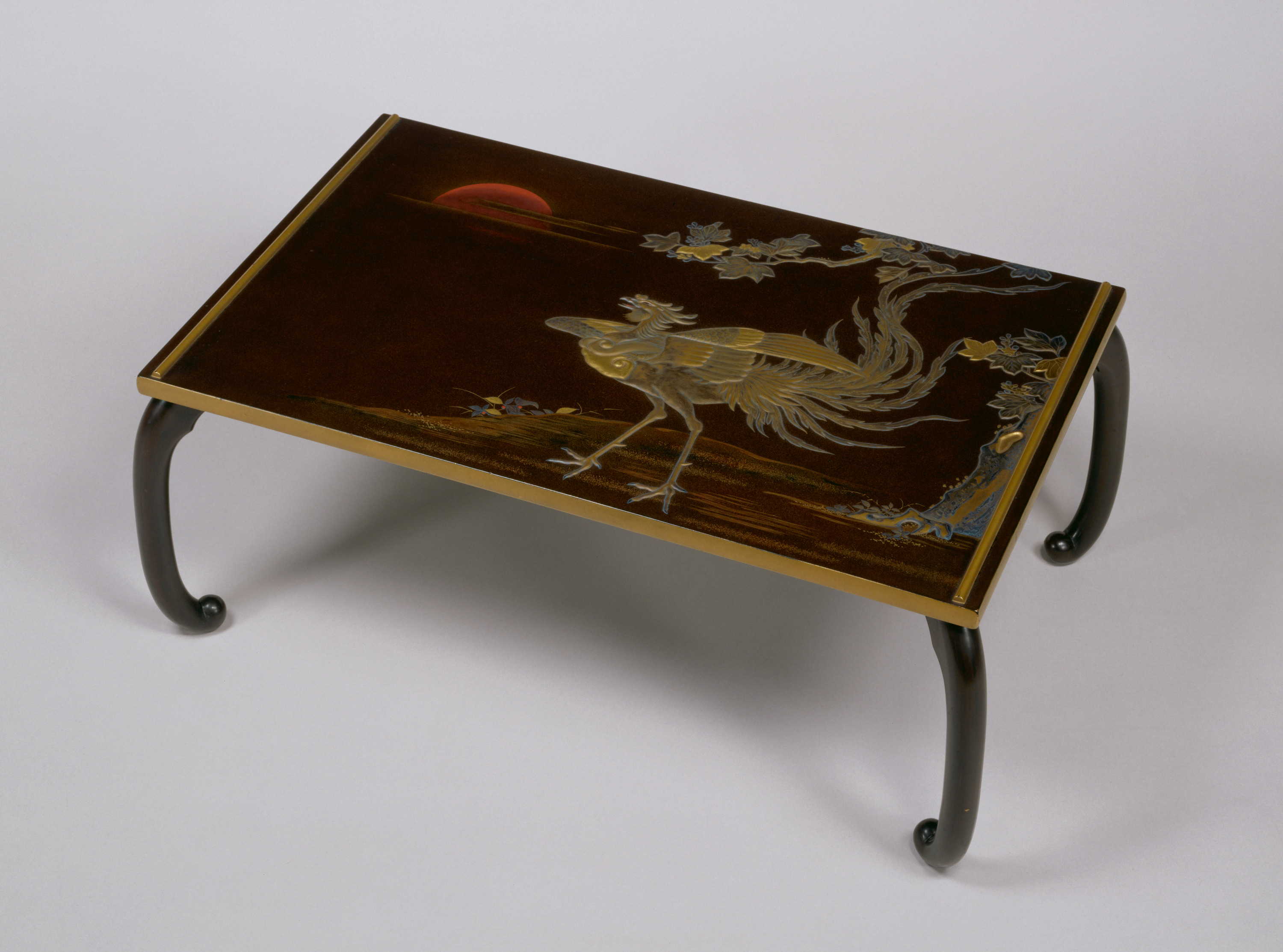
Stationery Stand Morning sun, paulownia and phoenix in maki-e

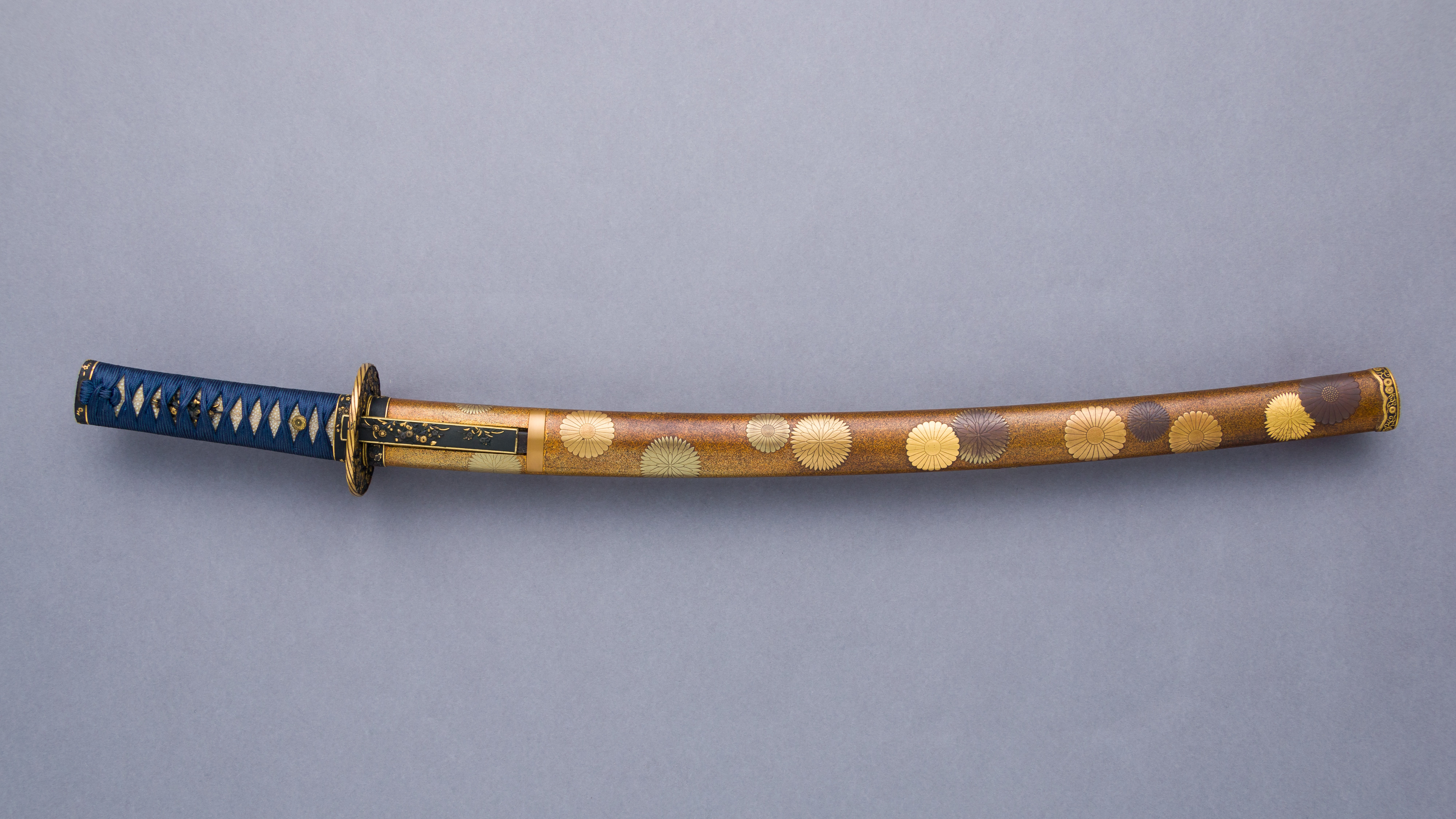
Lacquered exterior of wakizashi Fusamune

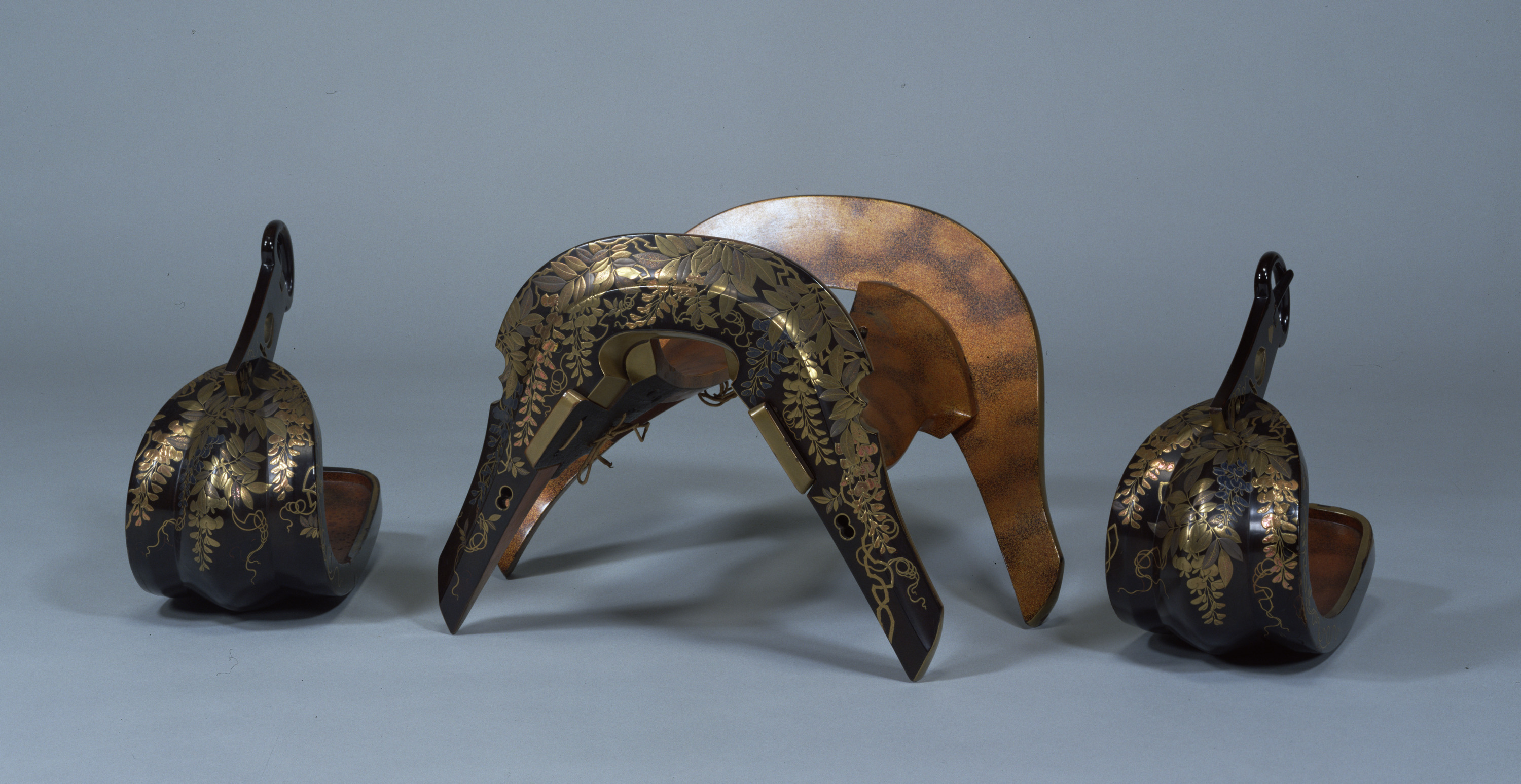
Saddle and Stirrups with Wisterias

=== The Meiji era ===
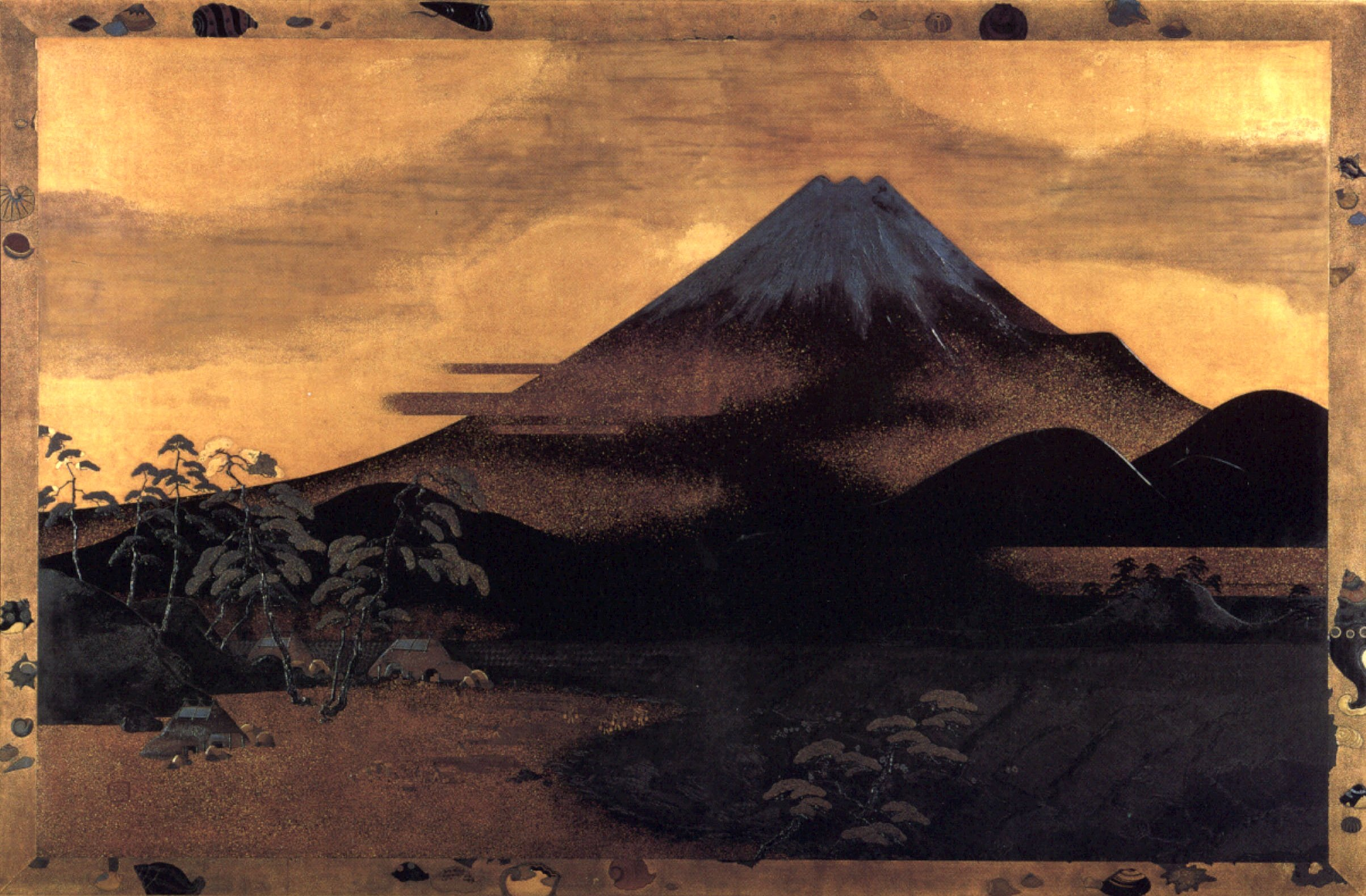
Maki-e Fuji Tagonoura, by Shibata Zeshin, Meiji period, 1872

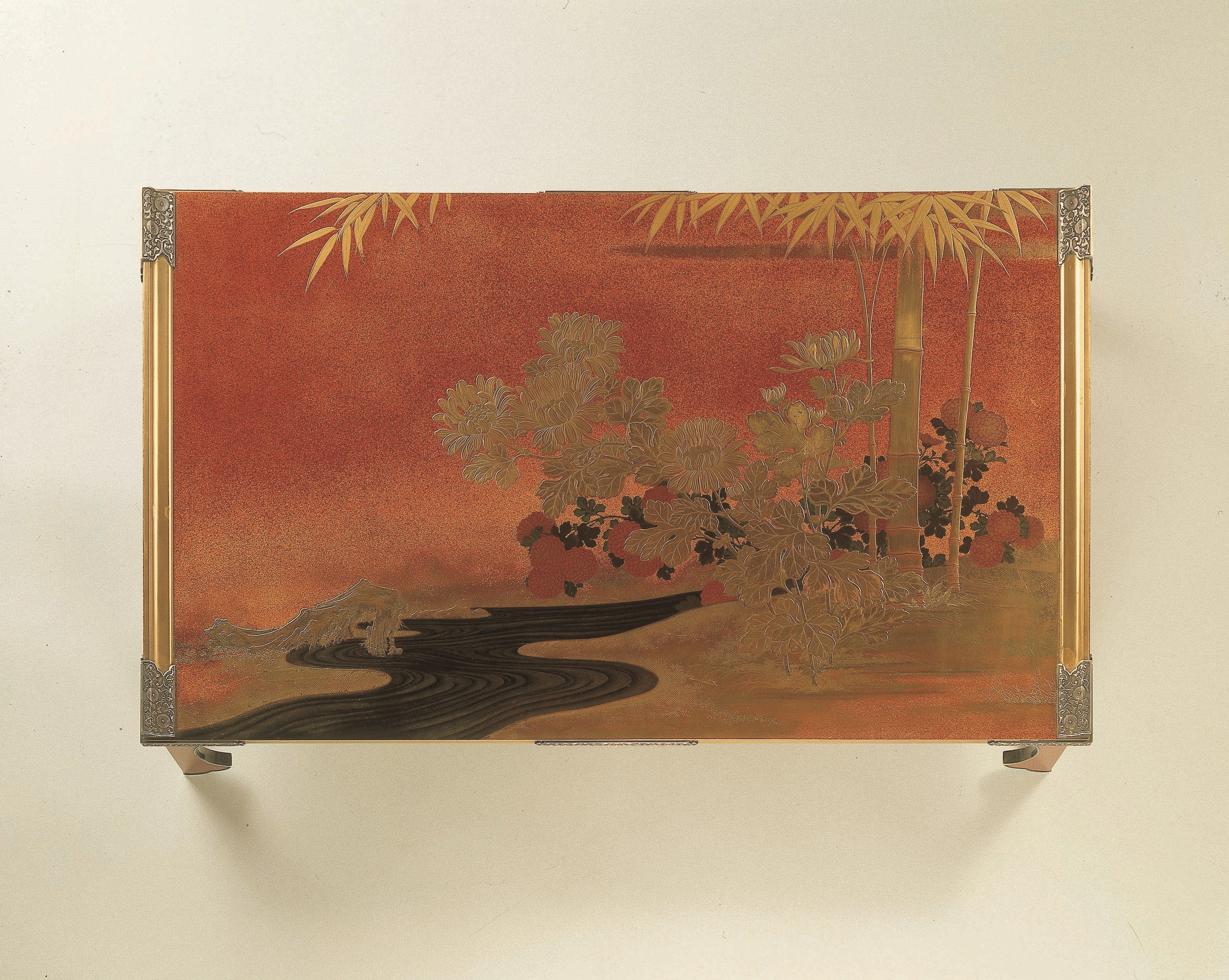
Maki-e Writing-table, by Shirayama Shosai, Meiji period, 19th century, Khalili Collection of Japanese Art

Early nineteenth-century economic hardship decreased the demand for gold- or silver-decorated lacquerwares. The Meiji era saw a renewed interest in lacquer as artists developed new designs and experimented with new textures and finishes. Foremost among these was Shibata Zeshin, who has been called "Japan's greatest lacquerer". The appeal of his highly original style was in the choice of motifs and subject matter rather than embedded gold and silver. He placed lacquer panels in frames, imitating Western oil paintings. Other notable lacquer artists of the 19th century include Nakayama Komin and Shirayama Shosai, both of whom, in contrast with Zeshin, maintained a classical style that owed a lot to Japanese and Chinese landscape art. Maki-e was the most common technique for quality lacquerware in this period.

Shibayama wares invented in the 1770s during the Edo period, combined lacquer, gold, silver, shellfish, ivory, coral, tortoise shell, ceramics and other novel materials in elaborate decorations. They get their name from Shibayama Senzo, originally Onogi Senzo, who adopted the name of his hometown on moving to Edo, and whose family produced and exhibited lacquerware in the new style. This style became popular in the Meiji period because it could be produced more quickly and cheaply than traditional lacquers. Somada ware, invented in the 1670s during the Edo period, is characterized by a regular pattern of finely cut shellfish, gold leaf and silver leaf, and became popular during this period. Richly-decorated lacquerwares in original designs were popular domestically, and even more so with Western buyers during this period of European and American fascination with Japanese art. The government took an active interest in the art export market, promoting Japan's lacquers and other decorative arts at a succession of world's fairs. Lacquer from Japanese workshops was recognised as technically superior to what could be produced anywhere else in the world.

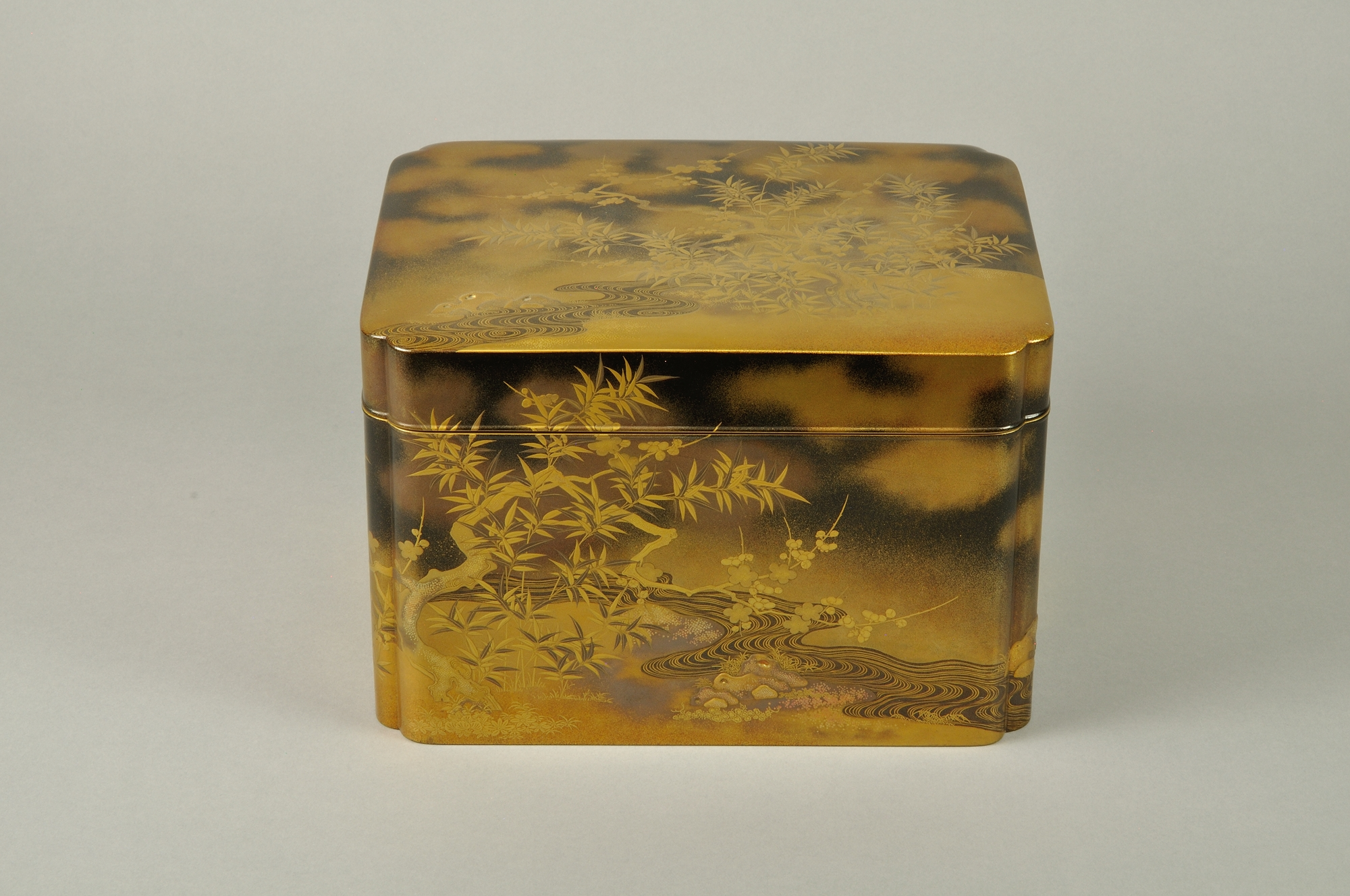
Box for Incense Set with Design of Plum and Bamboo, Edo or Meiji period, 19th century

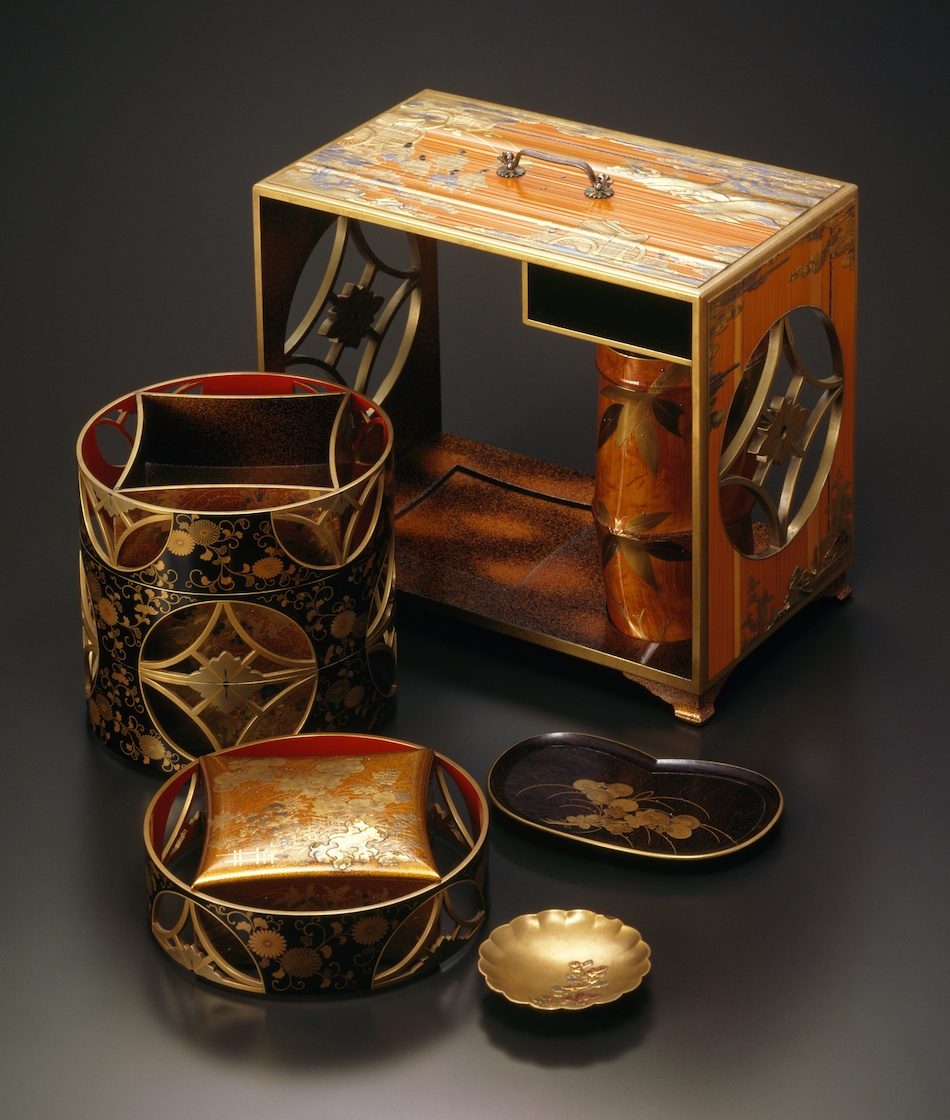
Picnic Box with Design of the Scene from The Tale of Genji in Maki-e Lacquer, Edo or Meiji period, 19th century

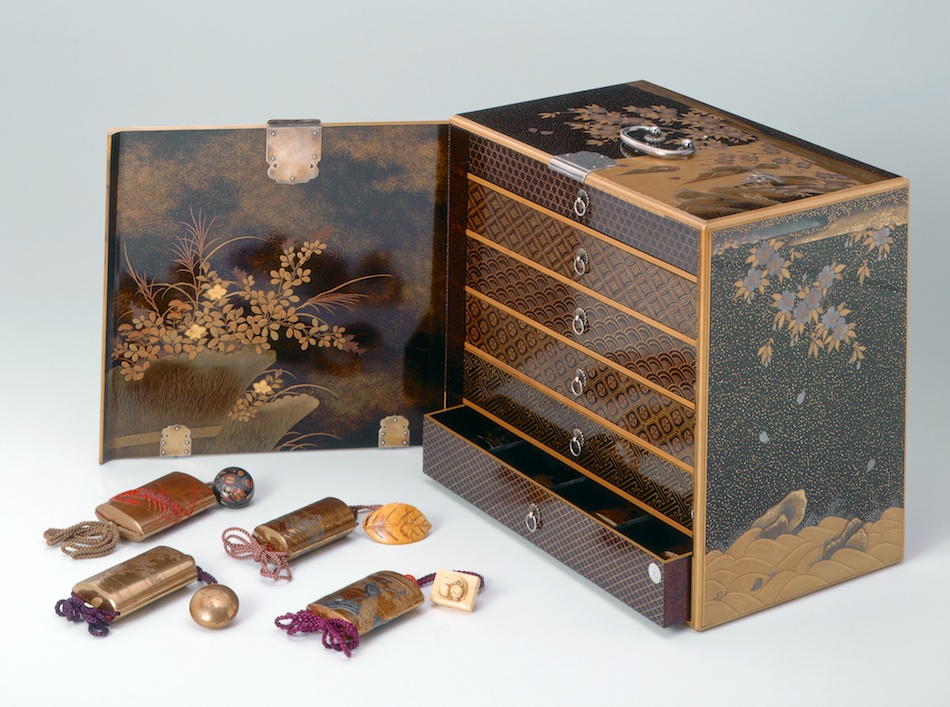
Inro Cabinet with Design of Waterfall in Maki-e Lacquer, Edo or Meiji period, 19th century

=== Twentieth century onwards ===
By Living National Treasure Gonroku Matsuda, 1960

After the Meiji era, a new generation of artists further changed the decorative language, depicting plants in a stylised way without naturalistic settings.

In recent decades, there has been effort made by the Japanese government to preserve the art of making lacquerware. Through the process of designating important craftsmen such as Gonroku Matsuda (松田権六) and Kazumi Murose (室瀬和美) as Living National Treasure as well the government's effort to encourage the development of new Urushi workshop, the art is gradually establishing itself once again.

The best lacquer technique from the end of the Edo period to the Meiji period, especially the inro technique, was almost lost in the westernization of Japanese lifestyle. However, in 1985 Tatsuo Kitamura (北村辰夫) set up his own studio called "Unryuan" (雲龍庵) and succeeded in recreating it. His lacquer works are collected in the Victoria and Albert Museum in London (V&A), and the 21st Century Museum of Contemporary Art, Kanazawa, and are an object of collection for the world's wealthy.

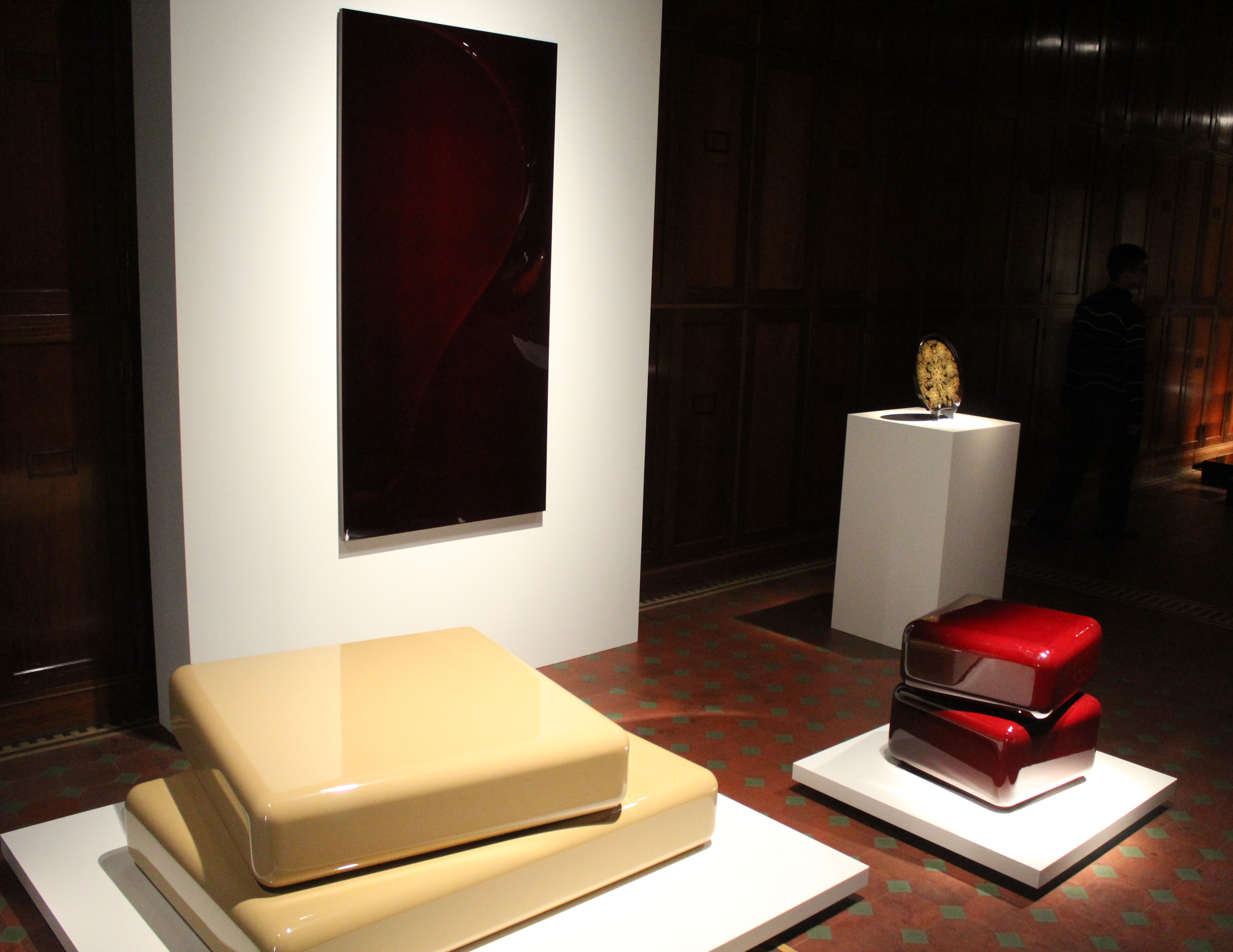
Yōkan by Sabine Marcelis and Kawatsura Shikki, Craft x Tech Tohoku Project, V&A, London (2024)

In 2024, the first edition of an initiative called the Craft x Tech Tohoku Project was launched in Tokyo. The project is "aimed at revitalizing Japanese crafts" by pairing "designers, technologists and artisans to create collectible design objects that elevate Japanese craft in the eyes of international audiences." It includes contemporary designs made by lacquerware artisans such as Kawatsura-Shikki (from Akita prefecture) and Tsugaru-Nuri (from Aomori prefecture). The work was later exhibited at Art Basel/Design Miami, and subsequently in the Victoria and Albert Museum during the 2024 London Design Festival.

== Techniques and processes ==
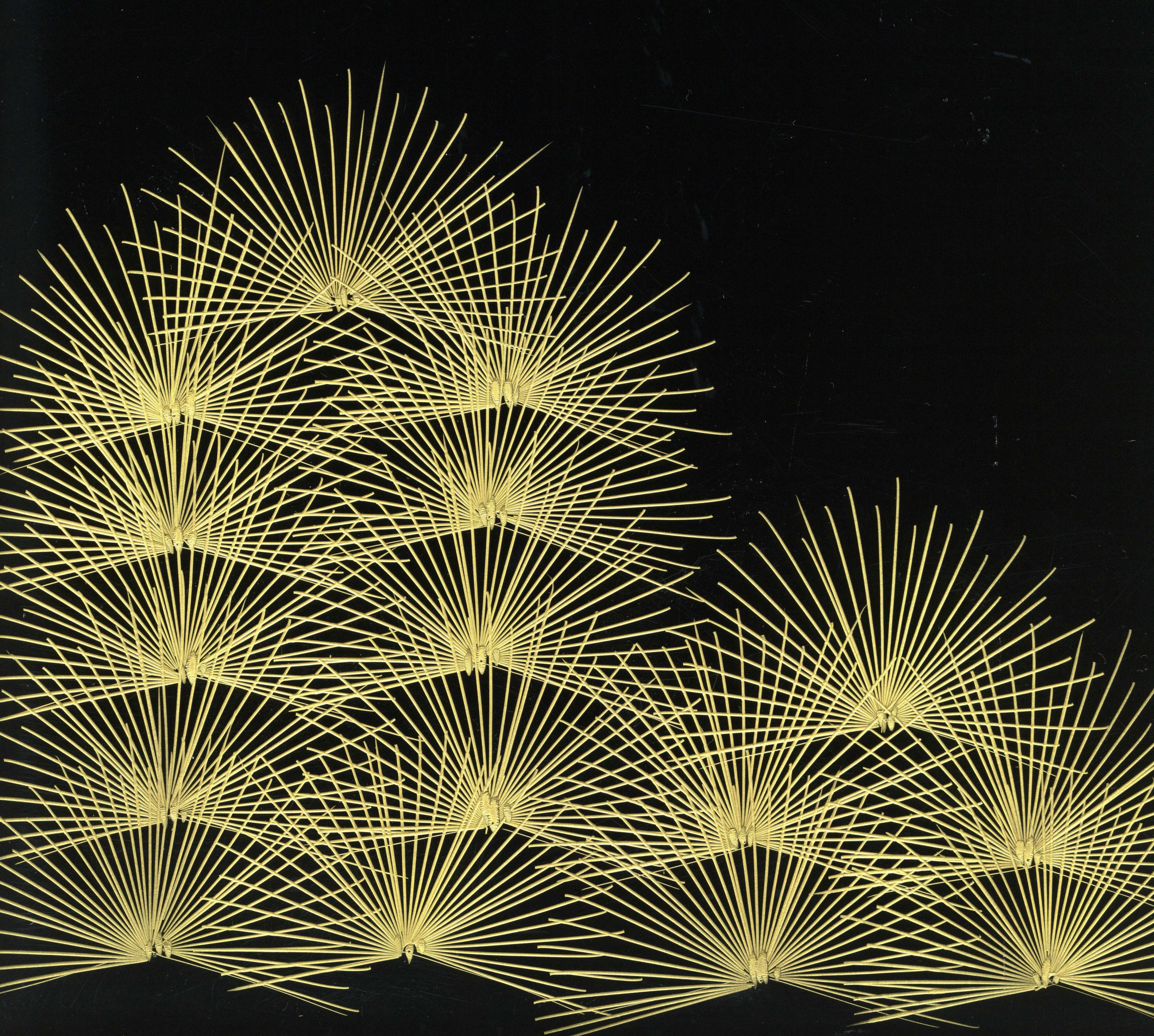
Closeup of the chinkin lacquer method, depicting needles of a pine tree

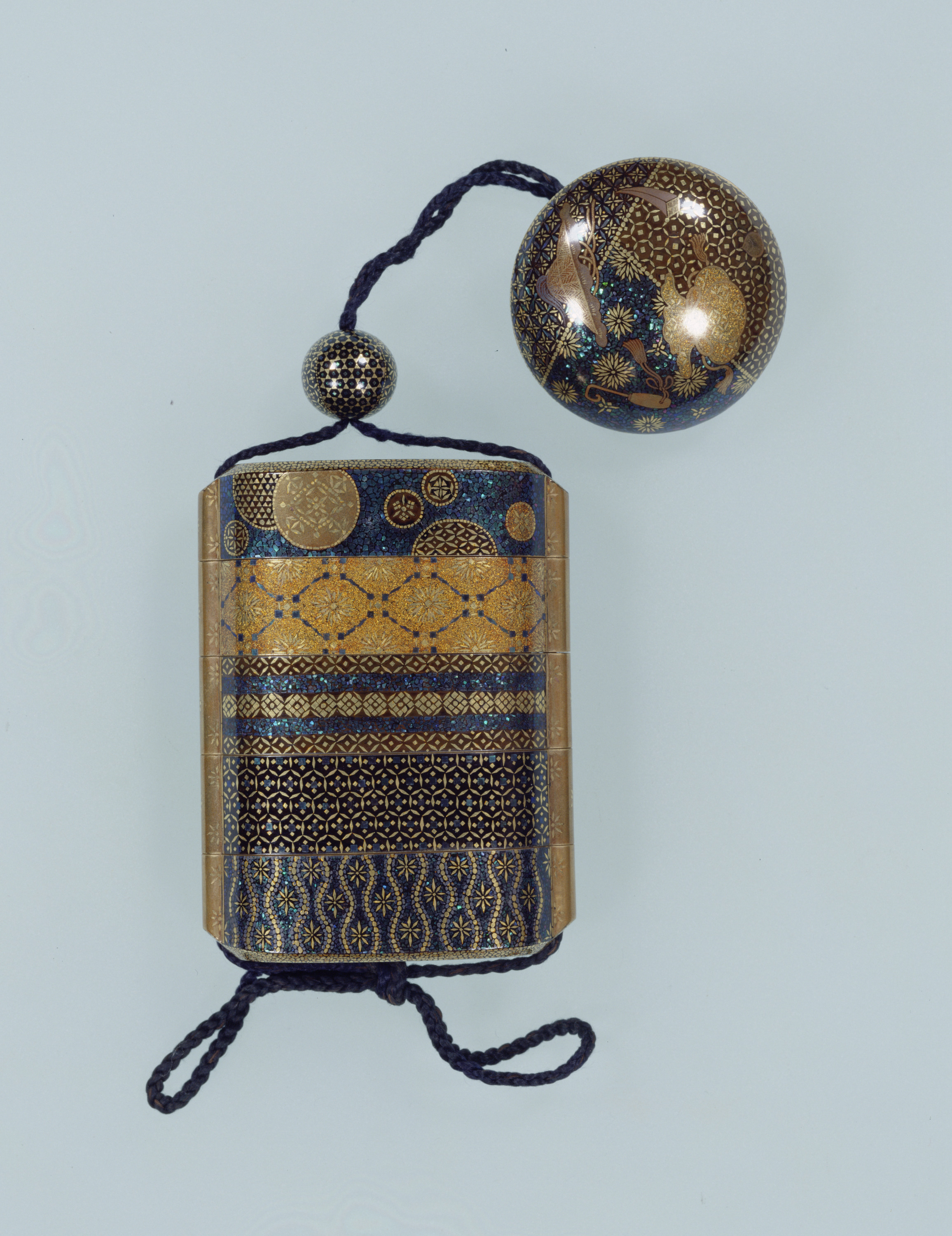
Inro, Design of minute patterns in mother-of-pearl inlay, Somada characterized by a combination of raden and makie techniques, Edo period

As in other countries where lacquerware has traditionally been produced, the process is fundamentally quite basic. An object is formed from wood, sometimes leather, paper, or basketry. Lacquer is applied to seal and protect the object, and then decoration is added. Generally, three coats (undercoat, middle-coat, and final coat) are used, the final coat sometimes being clear rather than black lacquer, in order to allow decorations to show through.

Alongside the red and black lacquers, it is common to see the use of inlay, often seashells or similar materials, as well as mica or other materials. The application of gold powder is known as maki-e, and is a very common decorative element.

A few examples of traditional techniques follow:

- ikkanbari (一閑張), also known as harinuki (張貫) is one common technique used to make tea wares. Invented by Hiki Ikkan in the early 17th century, the process involves the application of layers of lacquer to paper shaped in a mold.
- iro-urushi (色漆), literally "color lacquer", was created by adding pigments to clear lacquer. The limits of natural pigments allowed only five colors (red, black, yellow, green and brown) to be used up until the 19th century, when various innovations appeared, along with the later introduction of Western artificial pigments. Shibata Zeshin was a major innovator in this field, using not only color but also other substances mixed in with his lacquer to achieve a wide variety of effects, including the simulated appearance of precious metals, which were heavily restricted from artistic use at the time due to government concerns over excessive extravagance.
- shunkei-nuri (春慶塗), Shunkei lacquerware; it is created using transparent lacquer on yellow- or red-stained wood, so that the natural wood grain can be seen (similar to 'Kuroye Nuri' in this respect). The name is derived from the inventor who was active in Sakai during the reign of the Emperor Go-Kameyama (1368–1392). This method became popular in the 17th century in Takayama, Hida province. Many articles for use in tea-drinking were manufactured using this technique.
- urushi-hanga (漆絵版画), developed by Hakuo Iriyama, producing a printing plate from dry lacquer, that was carved and finally used like a block print but instead of traditional printing colors with pigmented lacquer.
- raden (螺鈿) using inlays of shell and ivory to decorate pieces that usually have a wood base
- maki-e (蒔絵) using metal powders, including gold, silver, copper and their alloys, spread with bamboo tubes or fine brushes. In hiramaki-e, the powders are sprinkled onto wet lacquer, to be then covered by another layer of lacquer. Takamaki-e achieves a high relief effect by repeated layers, sometimes including the addition of charcoal, sawdust or clay. Togidashi-e involves covering the original maki-e in several layers of lacquer, then polishing down until the design is visible.

== Regional forms ==
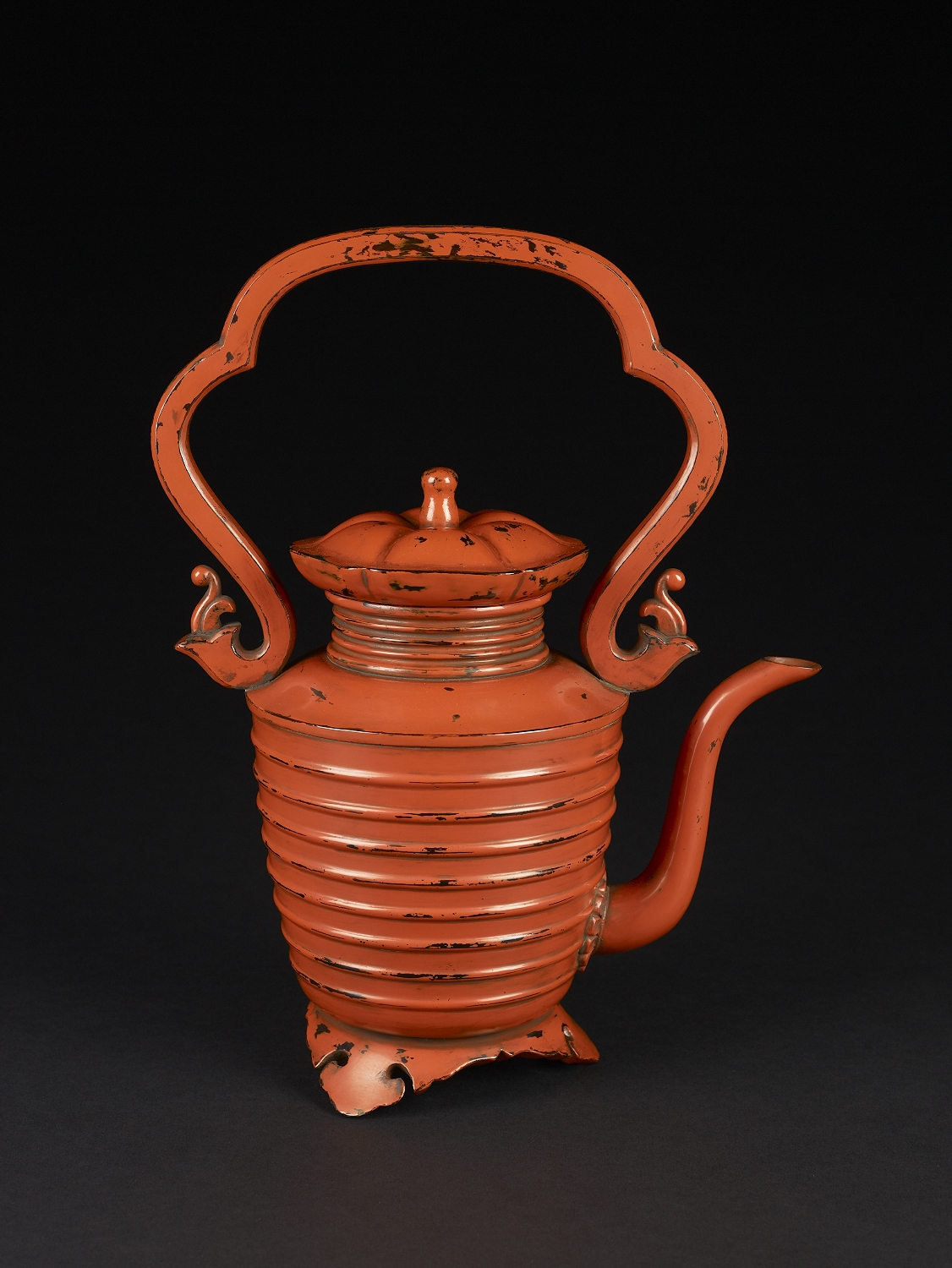
Ewer in negoro style. The red lacquer wears away gradually and irregularly with use, producing the effect of natural aging for which these pieces are highly appreciated.

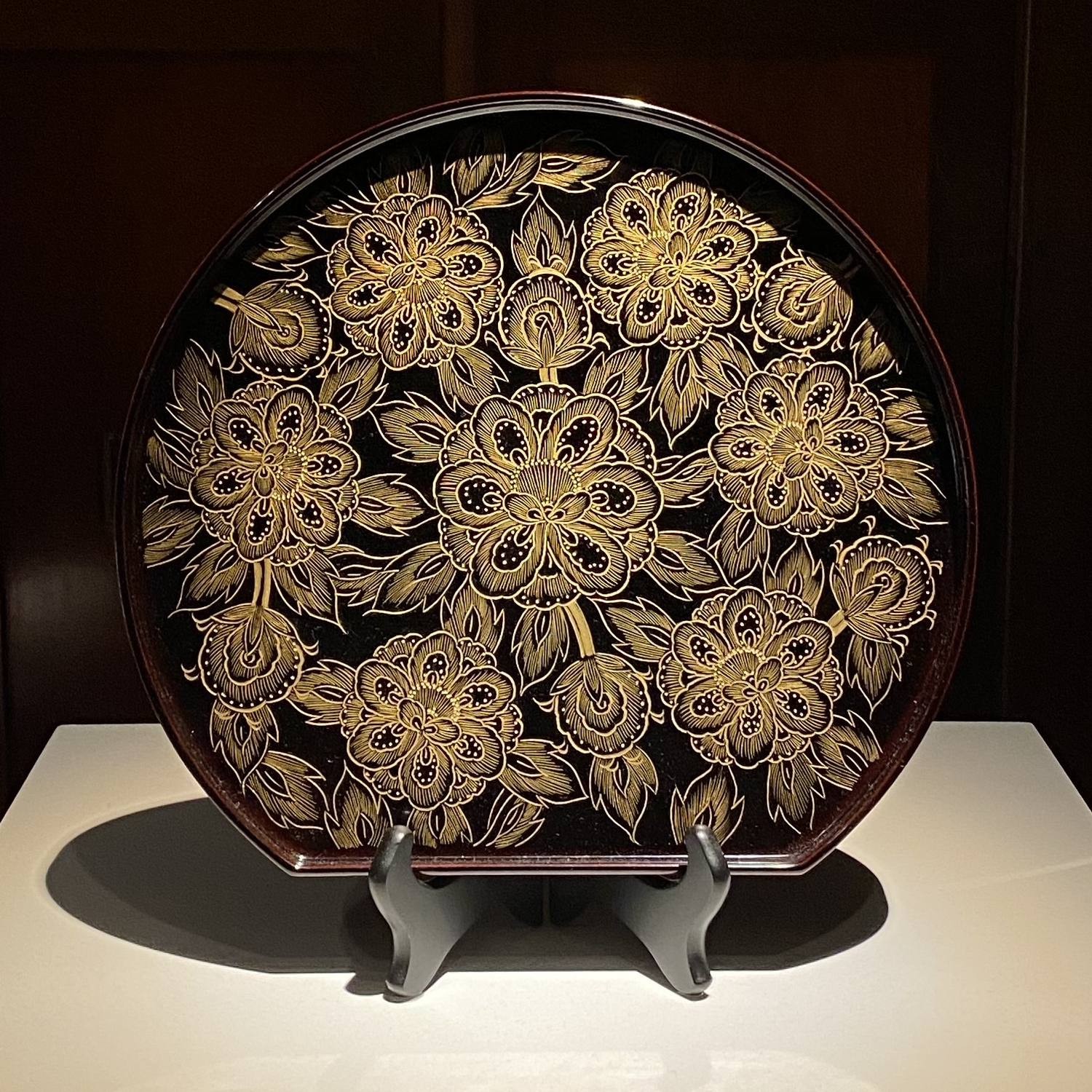
Kawatsura Shikki, Prince Consort Gallery, V&A South Kensington, London (2024)

As with most traditional arts, variations emerged over time as individual centers of production developed their own unique techniques and styles.

- Aizu wares developed in the late 16th century, and saw a peak in their production in the Meiji period. One Aizu technique is that of etching designs or images into the surface of the lacquer, and then filling in the space with gold or other materials. Other techniques distinctive of Aizu involve the burnishing of various clays and primers in the process.
- Jōhana wares are generally known for their use of maki-e and mitsuda-e (gold and lead decoration, respectively), and for the use of white or whitish lacquer.
- Kawatsura lacquerware from Yuzawa, Akita Prefecture was originally used for sword sheaths, bows, and armour beginning in c. 1200, it is now more commonly used to make bowls, plates, and other domestic items.
- Negoro lacquerwares were produced at the Negoro-ji temple complex in Izumi province. The red layers of lacquer on Negoro wares are intended to gradually wear away with use, revealing the black lacquer underneath. This effect has since been copied and emulated elsewhere.
- Ryukyuan lacquerware, though frequently included among types of Japanese lacquer, actually developed largely independently, with strong influences from China and Southeast Asia, as the Ryukyu Islands did not come under Japanese control until 1609.
- Tsugaru wares feature a technique supposedly developed by Ikeda Gentarō at the end of the 17th century; multiple layers of different colored lacquers are used to create a colorful mottled effect.
- Wakasa wares are made using a variety of colors, and the inclusion of eggshells, rice chaff, or other materials in the base coats. Silver or gold foil is used as well, and sealed under a layer of transparent lacquer.
- Wajima-nuri (輪島塗) can be dated back to late 15th century from Wajima, Ishikawa Prefecture. Wajima-nuri is famous for is its durable undercoating that is achieved by the application of multiple layers of urushi mixed with powdered diatomaceous earth (ji-no-ko) onto delicate zelkova wooden substrates.

== National Treasures ==
The government has registered a number of ancient items as National Treasures. Many of them are Buddhist items, dating from the Heian period. See List of National Treasures of Japan (crafts-others).

In 2020, the Crafts Gallery of the National Museum of Modern Art, Tokyo, which collects works made by Living National Treasures, moved to Kanazawa, Ishikawa Prefecture. This is due to the Japanese government's policy of local revitalization. Kanazawa, which flourished under the Maeda clan in the Edo period, is a city with a thriving traditional industry.

== Collections ==
The Tokugawa Art Museum in Nagoya City, Japan has a lacquer collection including the Edo period maki-e bridal trousseau that was designated a National Treasure.

Today, Japanese lacquerware is sought by collectors and museums around the world. Modern collections of Japanese lacquerware outside Japan include the Nasser D. Khalili Collection of Japanese Art which includes works by Shitaba Zeshin and other notable artists. Nasser Khalili has run exhibitions focused on Shibata Zeshin's work in four countries. The Charles A. Greenfield Collection in the United States covers the period from 1600 to 1900. Marie Antoinette's collection of domestic lacquer is split between the Louvre, the Guimet Museum, and the Palace of Versailles. The V&A Museum in London has a collection of mainly export lacquerware totalling around 2,500 pieces.

== Artisans ==
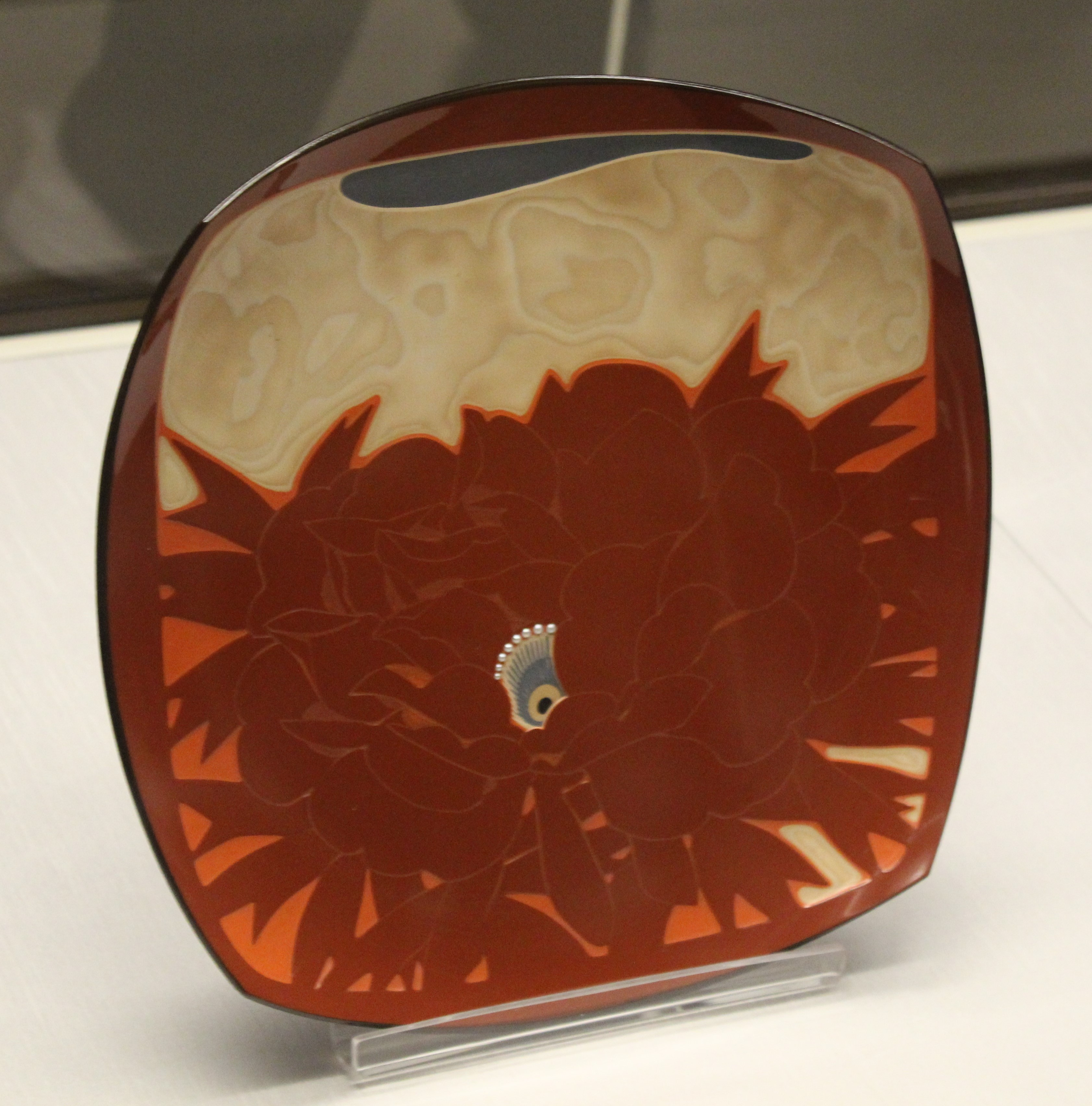
Tray with peony design by Otomaru Kōdō (1960s)

Amongst those lacquer artists that have been named as Living National Treasures are Kazumi Murose (室瀬和美), Kōichi Nakano (中野孝一), Fumio Mae (前史雄), Masami Isoi (磯井正美), Hitoshi Ōta (太田儔), Yoshito Yamashita (山下義人), Isao Ōnishi (大西勲), Kunie Komori (小森邦衞), Kiichirō Masumura (増村紀一郎), and Shōsai Kitamura (北村昭斎).

Past Living National Treasures were Shōzan Takano (高野松山), Gonroku Matsuda (松田権六), Naoji Terai (寺井直次), Yoshikuni Taguchi (田口善国), Shōgyo Ōba (大場松魚), Otomaru Kōdō (音丸耕堂), Taihō Mae (前大峰), Joshin Isoi (磯井如真), Yūsai Akaji (赤地友哉), Mashiki Masumura (増村益城), and Keishirō Shioda (塩多慶四郎).

Okada Akito (岡田章人作, 1910–1968) was exhibited regularly at the Nitten exhibition after 1947, and he served as a lacquer-restoration master for the Imperial Household collections.

== See also ==
- Kintsugi
- Japanning: a term for a later European imitation of this technique, using plant resins to create a different type of lacquer
- List of collections of Japanese art
- List of Traditional Crafts of Japan

== Sources ==
- Earle, Joe (1999). Splendors of Meiji : treasures of imperial Japan : masterpieces from the Khalili Collection. St. Petersburg, Fla.: Broughton International Inc. ISBN 1874780137. OCLC 42476594.
