= Iriyama =

Iriyama (入山, 込山) is a Japanese surname. The name refers to:

- Anna Iriyama (入山 杏奈, born 1995), a Japanese idol singer (AKB48)
- Hakuo Iriyama (入山 白翁, 1904–1991), a Japanese lacquer artist
- Noriko Iriyama (入山 法子, born 1985), a Japanese actress and model
