= Kaze no bon =

Annual Japanese festival

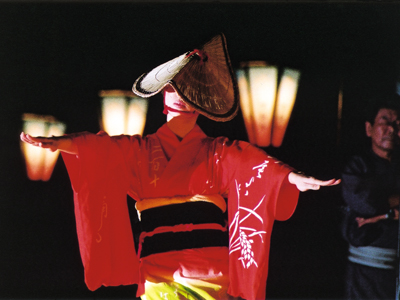
Kaze-no-Bon dancer

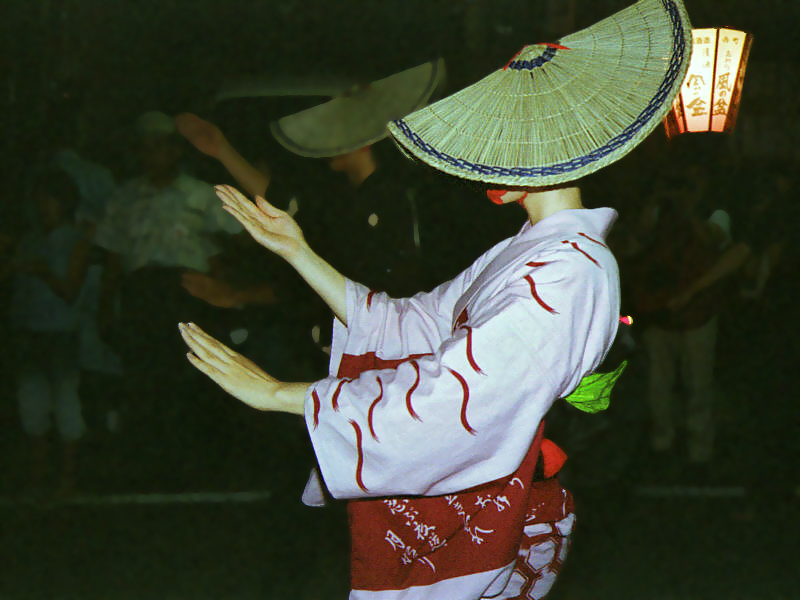
Kaze-no-Bon dancer

Kaze-no-Bon (風の盆) is a Japanese festival held every year from September 1 to 3 in Yatsuo, Toyama, Japan. Kaze-no-Bon literally translates to "Bon Dance of the Wind."

== Overview ==
This festival, having a history of about 300 years, recently became a popular tourist attraction to the otherwise sparsely populated mountain area. The original festival was held in order to appease typhoons and allow for a bountiful harvest of rice.

The festival is uniquely held at night, creating an atmosphere sometimes described as "creepy" by onlookers. The streets are decorated with paper lanterns, and long rows of young men and women, their faces covered by low-brimmed straw hats, dance simultaneously to melancholic music. This particular style of music is also unique to the region, using the somewhat-unknown kokyū (胡弓). A well-aged female voice and a traditional shamisen often accompanies the kokyū.

The hats, worn with matching kimono, cover the dancers faces to hide them from the wrath of the god they hope to appease. One other feature of the dancers is that they are all unmarried; this originated in traditional ideas that performers involved in the festival may anger the gods through their dancing, and that to perform the dance is a form of virginal self-sacrifice. However, these are considered to be superstitious reasons, with other, more modern explanations - such as the dancers performing to meet other young unmarried people - also existing.

Aside from the dance, games, trinkets and other traditional foods and services are also offered from the tiny shops lining the streets. Special Japanese paper is a popular souvenir for visitors to this festival.
