= Inokuchi, Toyama =

Dissolved municipality in Higashitonami district, Toyama prefecture, Japan

Inokuchi (井口村, Inokuchi-mura) was a village located in Higashitonami District, Toyama Prefecture, Japan.

As of 2003, the village had an estimated population of 1313 and a density of 114.17 persons per km^{2}. The total area was 11.50 km^{2}.

On November 1, 2004, Inokuchi, along with the towns of Fukuno, Inami and Jōhana, the villages of Kamitaira, Taira and Toga (all from Higashitonami District), and the town of Fukumitsu (from Nishitonami District), was merged to create the city of Nanto.
