= Toga, Toyama =

Dissolved municipality in Toyama prefecture, Japan

Toga (利賀村, Toga-mura) was a village located in Higashitonami District, Toyama Prefecture, Japan.

Historically, along with neighbouring Taira, Kami-Taira and Shirakawa-go, the four villages formed what was known as the Gokayama region. The region is renowned for a unique type of A-frame housing design. These "gassho-zukuri" houses traditionally had thatched roofs and were 3-4 stories high. The design helped keep snow from piling up in the heavy winter conditions.

As of 2003, Toga had an estimated population of 999 and a density of 5.63 persons per km^{2}. The total area was 177.58 km^{2}. However, the actual population is probably far less as many people who were registered in the village actually reside in neighboring areas.

On November 1, 2004, Toga, along with the towns of Fukuno, Inami and Jōhana, the villages of Inokuchi, Kamitaira and Taira (all from Higashitonami District), and the town of Fukumitsu (from Nishitonami District), was merged to create the city of Nanto.

Geographically, Toga is very mountainous with more than 96% of its area being forest cover.
