= Kamitaira =

- Flag Emblem

Kamitaira (上平村, Kamitaira-mura) was a village located in Higashitonami District, Toyama Prefecture, Japan.

As of 2003, the village had an estimated population of 956 and a density of 10.09 persons per km^{2}. The total area was 94.77 km^{2}.

In the early 16th century, a monk named Dōshū spread the Jōdo Shinshū. A valuable old document left by Doshu still remains at Gyotokuji Temple.

On November 1, 2004, Kamitaira, along with the towns of Fukuno, Inami and Jōhana, the villages of Inokuchi, Taira and Toga (all from Higashitonami District), and the town of Fukumitsu (from Nishitonami District), was merged to create the city of Nanto.

The World Heritage Suganuma village is located in Kamitaira village. Kamitaira is one of the three villages of the Gokayama region, famous for the World Heritage gassho houses. The traditional culture of Gokayama is extremely well preserved, especially the traditional dance, the Kokiriko.
