= Higashitonami District =

Former district in Toyama prefecture, Japan

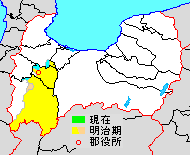
Map showing original extent of Higashitonami District in Toyama Prefecture: * yellow - areas formerly within the district borders during the early Meiji period

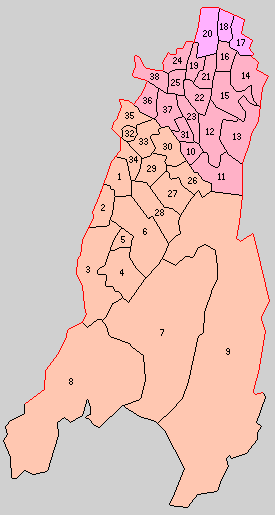
Colored areas are in this district.

Higashitonami (東礪波郡, Higashitonami-gun) was a district located in Toyama Prefecture, Japan.

As of 2003, the district had an estimated population of 46,031 with a density of 86.59 persons per km^{2}. The total area was 531.55 km^{2}.

== Municipalities ==
Prior to its dissolution, the district consisted of four towns and four villages:

- Fukuno (Note: Classified as a town.)
- Inami
- Inokuchi (Note: Classified as a village.)
- Jōhana
- Kamitaira
- Shōgawa
- Taira
- Toga

== History ==
Due to the enforcement of the district government, the district was founded in 1896 when the former Tonami District, occupied the southwestern Etchū Province, split into Nishitonami and Higashitonami Districts.

At the time of founding, the district covered all of the city of Tonami (but the sections of Takanami, Takasu, and Wakabayashi); the city of Nanto (but the Kamiyamada and Yamada sections from the former town of Fukumitsu); the sections of Higashiishiguro and Nishinojiri from the former town of Fukumitsu; and the sections of Nakata and Toidewaka in the city of Takaoka. The district seat was located at the town of De (now the center of the city of Tonami).

=== Recent mergers ===
- On November 1, 2004:
  - the town of Shōgawa was merged with the expanded city of Tonami.
  - the towns of Fukuno, Inami and Jōhana, and the villages of Inokuchi, Kamitaira, Taira and Toga, along with the town of Fukumitsu (from Nishitonami District) were merged to form the city of Nanto. Therefore, Higashitonami District was dissolved as a result of this merger.

== See also ==
- List of dissolved districts of Japan
