= Hosoiri =

Dissolved municipality in Toyama prefecture, Japan

Hosoiri (細入村, Hosoiri-mura) was a village located in Nei District, Toyama Prefecture, Japan.

As of 2003, the village had an estimated population of 1,764 and a density of 43.84 persons per km^{2}. The total area was 40.24 km^{2}.

On April 1, 2005, Hosoiri, along with the towns of Ōsawano and Ōyama (both from Kaminiikawa District), the towns of Fuchū and Yatsuo, and the village of Yamada (all from Nei District), was merged into the expanded city of Toyama.
