= Nishitonami District =

Former district in Toyama prefecture, Japan

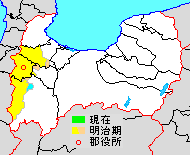
Map showing original extent of Nishitonami District in Toyama Prefecture: * yellow - areas formerly within the district borders during the early Meiji period

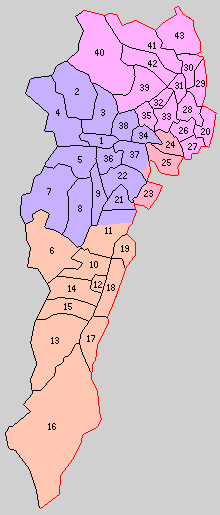
Colored areas are in this district.

Nishitonami (西礪波郡, Nishitonami-gun) was a district located in Toyama Prefecture, Japan.

As of November 1, 2004, the district had an estimated population of 13,770 with a density of 234.34 persons per km^{2}. The total area was 58.76 km^{2}.

== Municipalities ==
Prior to its dissolution, the district consisted of only one town left:

- Fukuoka (Note: Classified as a town.)

== History ==
Due to the enforcement of the district government, the district was founded in 1896 when the former Tonami District, occupied the southwestern Etchū Province, split into Nishitonami and Higashitonami districts.

The district covered all of the city of Oyabe, and the areas of Toide, Fukuoka, and Tatsuno in the city of Takaoka. The district seat was located at the town of Ishido (now the city of Oyabe).

=== District Timeline ===
In 1962, the towns of Ishido and Tochu were merged to form the city of Oyabe.

=== Recent mergers ===
On November 1, 2004, the town of Fukumitsu was merged with the towns of Fukuno, Inami and Jōhana, and the villages of Inokuchi, Kamitaira, Taira and Toga (all from Higashitonami District) to create the city of Nanto.

On November 1, 2005, the town of Fukuoka was merged into the expanded city of Takaoka. Therefore, Nishitonami District was dissolved as a result of this merger.

== See also ==
- List of dissolved districts of Japan
