= Inami, Toyama =

- Town
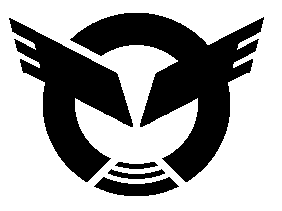
- Flag Emblem

- Location of Inami in Japan
- Coordinates: 36.560215°N 136.971021°E
- Country: Japan
- Prefecture: Toyama

Population
  - Estimate (2003): 9,972
  - Density: 380.61/km^{2} (985.8/sq mi)
- Time zone: UTC+9 (Japan Standard Time)

Inami (井波町, Inami-machi) was a town located in Higashitonami District, Toyama Prefecture, Japan. In 2003, the town had an estimated population of 9,972 and a density of 380.61 persons per km^{2}. The total area was 26.20 km^{2}.

On November 1, 2004, Inami, along with the towns of Fukuno and Jōhana, the villages of Inokuchi, Kamitaira, Taira and Toga (all from the 12th District), and the town of Fukumitsu (from the 5th District), merged to create the city of Nanto.

== History ==
Inami is most well known for its extensive wood carving district which traces its origins to the construction of the Inami Betsuin Zuisen-ji Temple in 1390. This temple, entirely made of wood and ornamented with intricate carvings has a long history of burning down only to be rebuilt in a much more extravagant fashion. The temple was most recently rebuilt during the Meiji period in 1885, and now exists as the largest wooden Pureland Buddhist temple in the Hokuriku region. It was officially designated as "one of the prefecture's important cultural assets" on April 1, 1965.

Because of its rich history, wood carving is the major trade in Inami. During the reconstruction of the temple in the mid 18th century woodcarvers from Kyoto were dispatched to help in the rebuilding process. These helpers ushered in a new era of woodcarving in Inami, and local carpenters began to produce a more varied assortment of carvings than the temple pieces they had focused on previously. Presently, the woodcarvers use over 200 different variations of chisels to complete their works. They are considered to be the most skilled woodcarvers Japan.

The sound of the Inami woodcarving district was chosen in 1996 as one of the 100 Soundscapes of Japan.
