= Fukuoka, Toyama =

Town in Toyama Prefecture, Japan

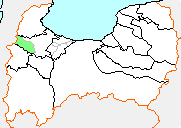
Location of the former town of Fukuoka in Toyama Prefecture

A JR West train passes through Fukuoka town on the Hokuriku Main Line.

Fukuoka (福岡町, Fukuoka-machi) was a town located in Nishitonami District, Toyama Prefecture, Japan.

On November 1, 2005, Fukuoka was merged into the expanded city of Takaoka.

As of 2003, the town has an estimated population of 13,623 and a density of 231.84 persons per km^{2}. The total area is 58.76 km^{2}.

The town festival was called Tsukurimon and featured carvings and dioramas made from produce.

Fukuoka was home to Kameo Corporation, the designers of the "Boyfriend's Arm Pillow".
