= Fukumitsu, Toyama =

Dissolved municipality in Toyama prefecture, Japan

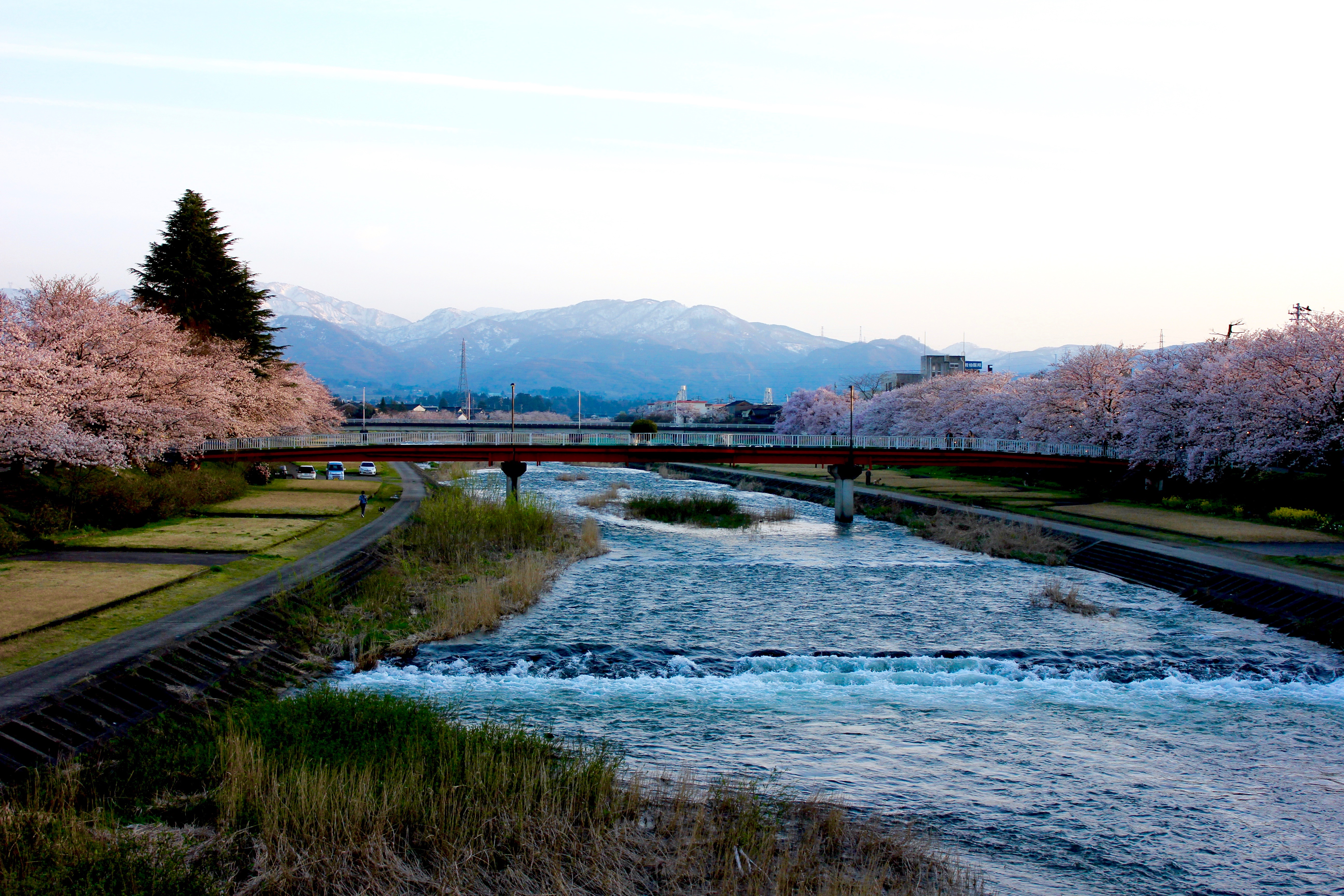
The Oyabe River in Fukumitsu, lined with cherry blossoms in spring.

Fukumitsu (福光町, Fukumitsu-machi) was a town located in Nishitonami District, Toyama Prefecture, Japan.

Fukumitsu town developed around Fukumitsu Castle, which was built around the 12th century.

As of 2003, the town had an estimated population of 20,056 and a density of 119.35 persons per km^{2}. The total area was 168.05 km^{2}.

On November 1, 2004, Fukumitsu, along with the towns of Fukuno, Inami and Jōhana, and the villages of Inokuchi, Kamitaira, Taira and Toga (all from Higashitonami District), was merged to create the city of Nanto.

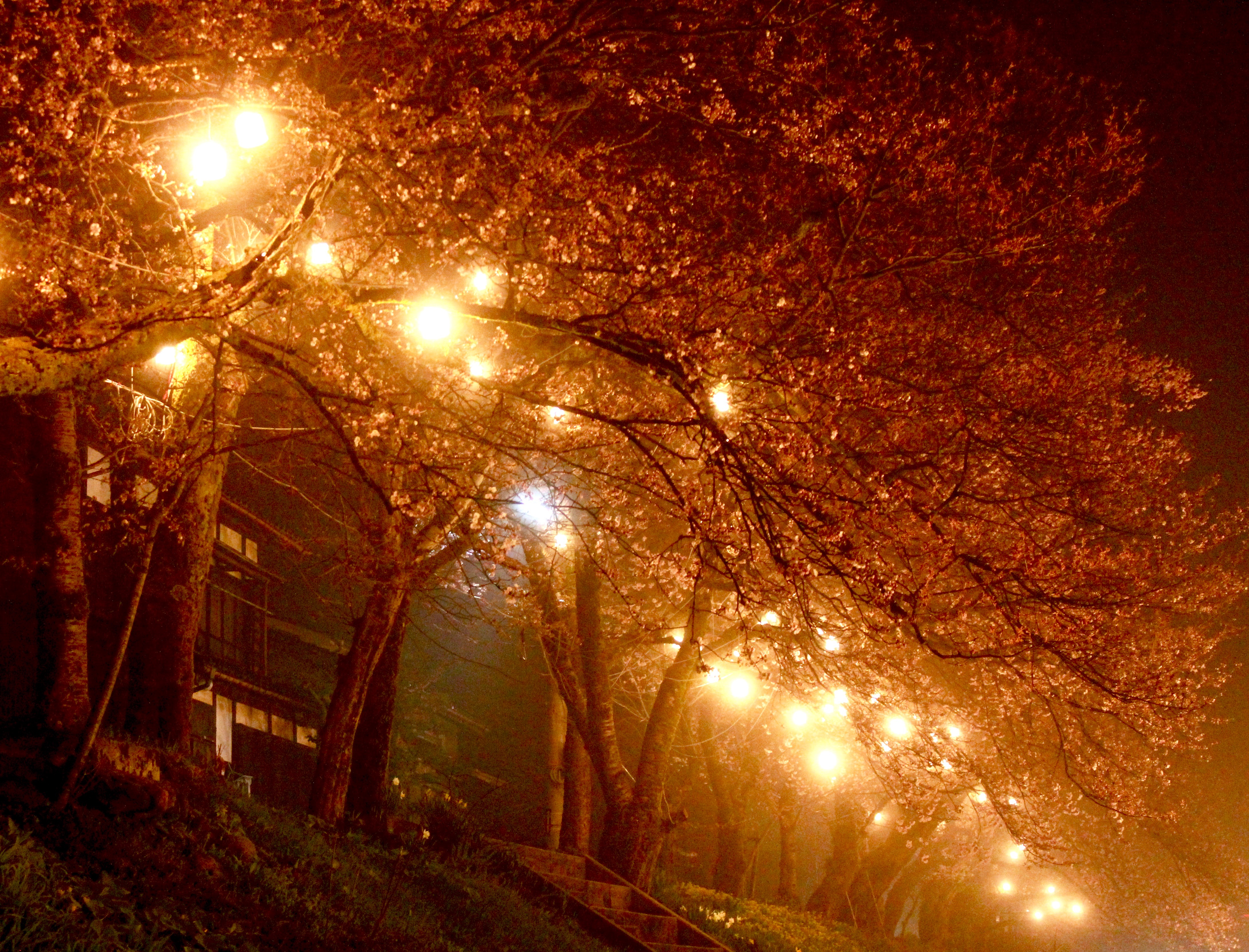
Cherry blossom light-up on the Oyabe River.

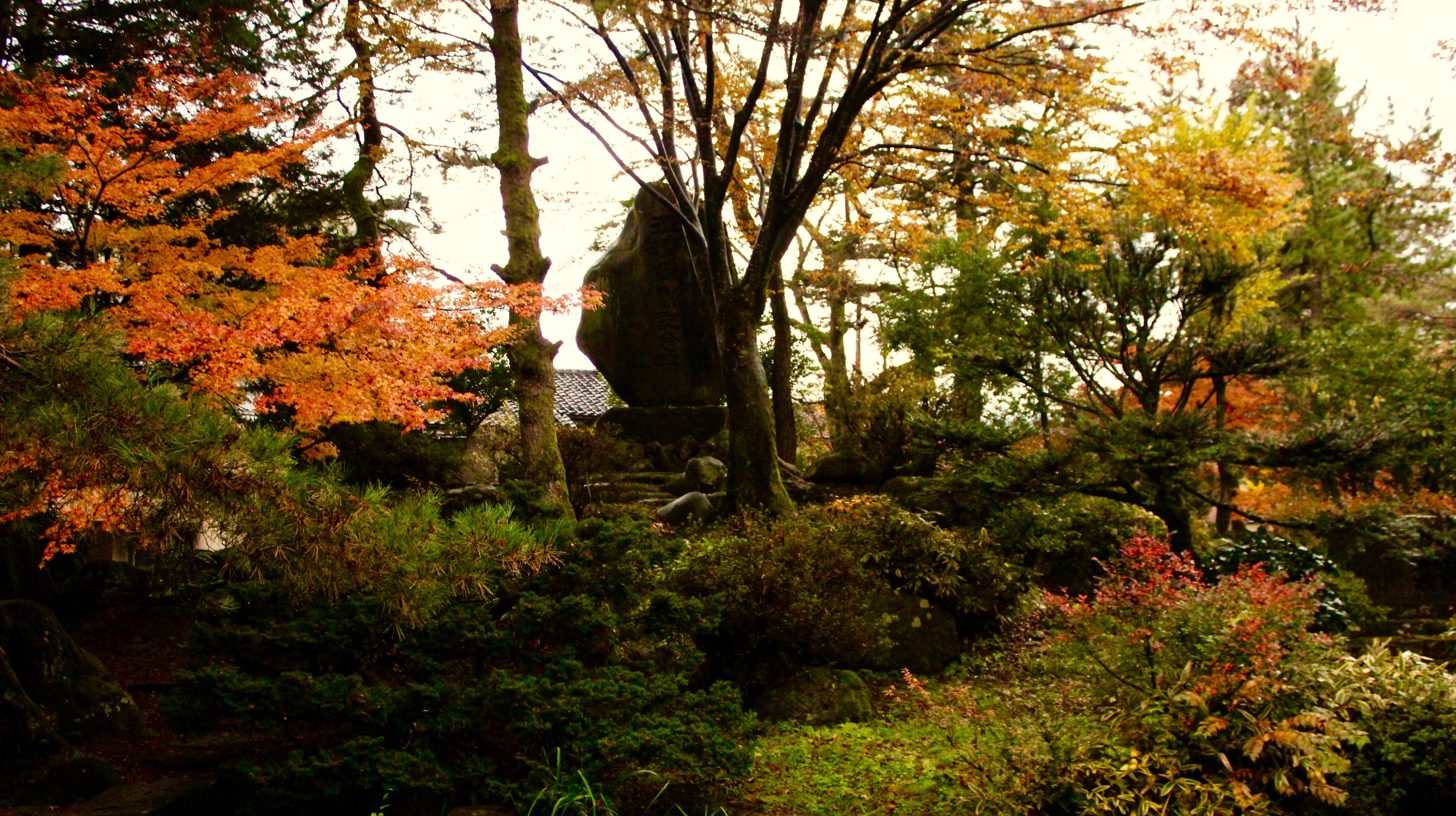
Fukumitsu Park in autumn.
