= Yamada, Toyama =

Dissolved municipality in Toyama prefecture, Japan

Yamada (山田村, Yamada-mura) was a village located in Nei District, Toyama Prefecture, Japan.

As of 2003, the village had an estimated population of 1,983 and a density of 48.46 persons per km^{2}. The total area was 40.92 km^{2}.

On April 1, 2005, Yamada, along with the towns of Ōsawano and Ōyama (both from Kaminiikawa District), the towns of Fuchū and Yatsuo, and the village of Hosoiri (all from Nei District), was merged into the expanded city of Toyama.
