= Nei District =

Former district in Toyama Prefecture, Japan

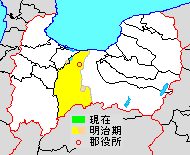
Map showing original extent of Nei District in Toyama Prefecture: * yellow - areas formerly within the district borders during the early Meiji period

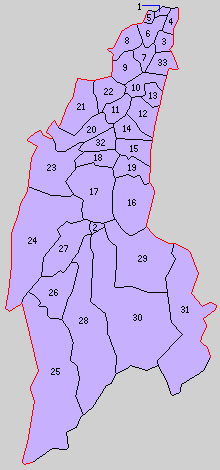
Colored areas are in this district.

Nei (婦負郡, Nei-gun) was a district located in Toyama Prefecture, Japan.

As of 2003, the district has an estimated population of 61,601 with a density of 159.56 persons per km^{2}. The total area is 386.06 km^{2}.

== Municipalities ==
Prior to its dissolution, the district consisted of two towns and two villages:

- Fuchū (Note: Classified as a town.)
- Hosoiri (Note: Classified as a village.)
- Yamada
- Yatsuo

== History ==
=== Recent mergers ===
- On April 1, 2005 - The towns of Fuchū and Yatsuo, and the villages of Hosoiri and Yamada, along with the towns of Ōsawano and Ōyama (both from Kaminiikawa District), were merged into the expanded city of Toyama. Therefore, Nei District and Kaminiikawa District were both dissolved as the result of this merger.

== See also ==
- List of dissolved districts of Japan
