= Fuchū, Toyama =

Dissolved municipality in Toyama prefecture, Japan

Fuchū (婦中町, Fuchū-machi) was a town located in Nei District, Toyama Prefecture, Japan.

As of 2003, the town had an estimated population of 35,749 and a density of 525.41 persons per km^{2}. The total area was 68.04 km^{2}.

On April 1, 2005, Fuchū, along with the towns of Ōsawano and Ōyama (both from Kaminiikawa District), the town of Yatsuo, and the villages of Hosoiri and Yamada (all from Nei District), was merged into the expanded city of Toyama.
