= Kaminiikawa District =

Former district in Toyama prefecture, Japan

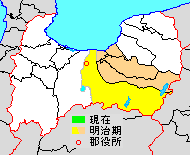
Map showing original extent of Kaminiikawa District in Toyama Prefecture: * yellow - areas formerly within the district borders during the early Meiji period

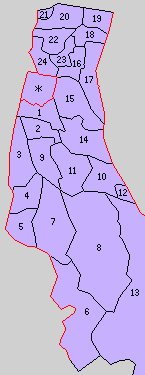
Colored areas are in this district.

Kaminiikawa (上新川郡, Kaminiikawa-gun) was a district located in Toyama Prefecture, Japan.

As of 2003, the district had an estimated population of 34,491 with a density of 53.31 persons per km^{2}. The total area was 646.98 km^{2}.

== Municipalities ==
Prior to its dissolution, the district consisted of only two towns:

- Ōsawano (Note: Classified as a town.)
- Ōyama

== History ==
=== District Timeline ===
- 1889 (8 towns, 50 villages)
  - At the time of enforcing the city status, the town of Toyama gained city status.
  - At the time of enforcing the town and village status, the district formed into 8 towns and 49 villages.
- April 1, 1896 - 5 towns and 28 villages split and created Nakaniikawa District. (3 towns, 21 villages)

=== Recent mergers ===
- On April 1, 2005 - The towns of Ōsawano and Ōyama, along with the towns of Fuchū and Yatsuo, and the villages of Hosoiri and Yamada (all from Nei District), were merged into the expanded city of Toyama. Therefore, Kaminiikawa District and Nei District were dissolved as a result of this merger.

== See also ==
- List of dissolved districts of Japan
