= Fukuno =

Dissolved municipality in Toyama prefecture, Japan

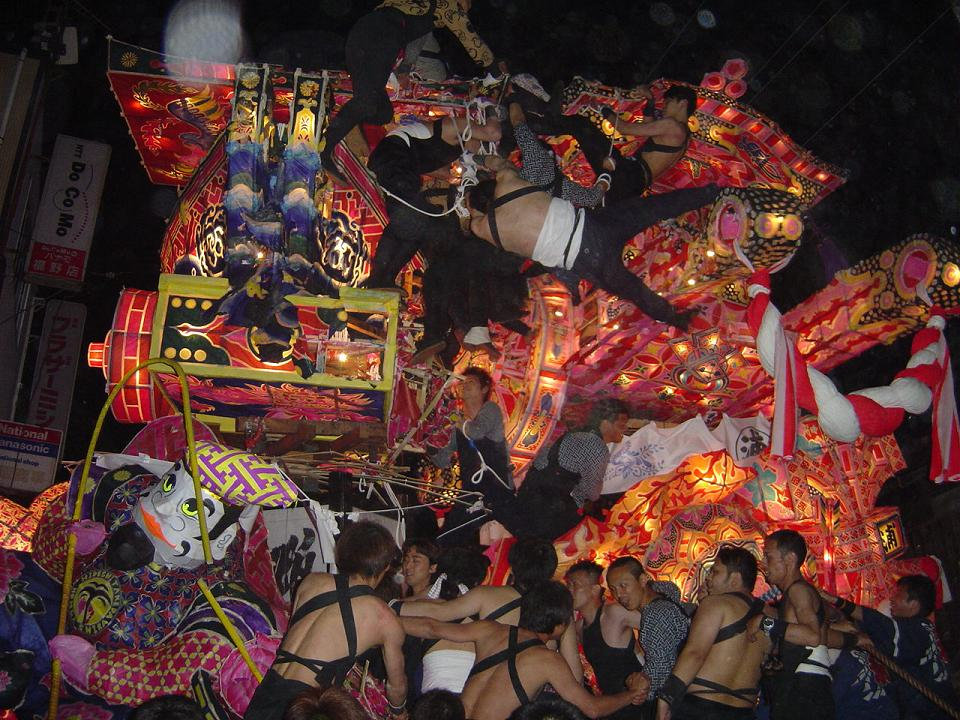
Fukuno Yotaka Festival

Fukuno (福野町, Fukuno-machi) was a town located in Higashitonami District, Toyama Prefecture, Japan.

As of 2003, the town had an estimated population of 14,526 and a density of 458.09 persons per km^{2}. The total area was 31.71 km^{2}.

On November 1, 2004, Fukuno, along with the towns of Inami and Jōhana, the villages of Inokuchi, Kamitaira, Taira and Toga (all from Higashitonami District), and the town of Fukumitsu (from Nishitonami District), was merged to create the city of Nanto.

== Culture and local festivals ==
Once a year, from May 1 to May 2, the Yotaka Matsuri is held in Fukuno. The matsuri is characterized with colourful floats consisting of giant, decorative paper lanterns. At midnight, the lanterns begin to be paraded around town with local men hanging from them who start battles whenever other floats come close.

A music festival called "Sukiyaki Meets the World" is held annually in the end of August. A lot of artists take part in it from all over the world. During the festival, a steel drum is played by beating the drum with a stick.
