= Yatsuo =

Dissolved municipality in Nei district, Toyama prefecture, Japan

Yatsuo (八尾町, Yatsuo-machi) was a town located in Nei District, Toyama Prefecture, Japan. It was famous for Owara Kaze no bon festival.

As of 2003, the town had an estimated population of 22,105 and a density of 93.33 persons per km^{2}. The total area was 236.86 km^{2}.

On April 1, 2005, Yatsuo, along with the towns of Ōsawano and Ōyama (both from Kaminiikawa District), the town of Fuchū, and the villages of Hosoiri and Yamada (all from Nei District), was merged into the expanded city of Toyama.
