= Ōsawano =

Town in Toyama Prefecture, Japan

Ōsawano (大沢野町, Ōsawano-machi) was a town located in Kaminiikawa District, Toyama Prefecture, Japan.

As of 2003, the town had an estimated population of 22,805 and a density of 305.45 persons per km^{2}. The total area was 74.66 km^{2}.

On April 1, 2005, Ōsawano, along with the town of Ōyama (also from Kaminiikawa District), the towns of Fuchū and Yatsuo, and the villages of Hosoiri and Yamada (all from Nei District), was merged into the expanded city of Toyama.
