= Ōyama, Toyama =

Dissolved municipality in Toyama prefecture, Japan

Ōyama (大山町, Ōyama-machi) was a town located in Kaminiikawa District, Toyama Prefecture, Japan.

As of 2003, the town had an estimated population of 11,686 and a density of 20.42 persons per km^{2}. The total area was 572.32 km^{2}.

On April 1, 2005, Ōyama, along with the towns of Ōsawano (also from Kaminiikawa District), the towns of Fuchū and Yatsuo, and the villages of Hosoiri and Yamada (all from Nei District), was merged into the expanded city of Toyama.
