= Taira, Toyama =

Dissolved municipality in Toyama prefecture, Japan

Taira (平村, Taira-mura) was a village located in Higashitonami District, Toyama Prefecture, Japan.

As of 2003, the village had an estimated population of 1,322 and a density of 14.06 persons per km^{2}. The total area was 94.02 km^{2}.

On November 1, 2004, Taira, along with the towns of Fukuno, Inami and Jōhana, the villages of Inokuchi, Kamitaira and Toga (all from Higashitonami District), and the town of Fukumitsu (from Nishitonami District), was merged to create the city of Nanto.
