= Hakuo Iriyama =

Iriyama Hakuo (入山白翁 (Iriyama Hakuō), or birth name 平太郎 (Heitarō); 1904 – 11 November 1991) was a lacquer artist from Shirone, Niigata in Japan. He began training as an apprentice in his family at the age of 15, and developed his own technique of painting, which he referred to as shitsuga.

== Early life ==
It was in 1926 when Hakuo started to study dry lacquer techniques in Tokyo, and in two years, he was commenced to the Craft Department to major Lacquer Craft at Ueno Bijyutsu Gakko (present day Tokyo University of the Arts) in 1928. While still studying at the college, Hakuo won his first prize in 1931 at the national Arts and Crafts Exhibition (Bijutsu Kougei-ten). There was another prestigious art show for an aspiring artist called the Art Associations Exhibition (Bijutsu Kyokai-ten), which Hakuo won the next year. When graduated from his college in 1933, his graduation work was on honorable display for the highest excellency before joining the permanent collection of the Art Museum at Tokyo University of the Arts.

Hakuo continued to make traditional crafts with his own design to apply for art shows. In 1935 and 1936, he won two major shows, and the success at the Art Associations Exhibition had Hakuo's tea caddy set to be joined to the collection of Empress Teimei later, along with incense burners and jewelry chests. The other show, or the 3rd Shin Bunten Exhibition was a government sponsored show to encourage arts and crafts sectors to contribute to gain foreign currencies, and exporters were keen to commission talented person like Hakuo who took increased orders for overseas trade since around 1936.

The former office of Ministry of Economy, Trade and Industry sanctioned the Japan Foreign Trade Council, a foreign trade campaign system where Hakuo gained membership in 1940. As that year was the 2,600th year in commemoration of the Imperial reign, works were shipped feverishly to customers overseas, and as the wartime restriction on industrial materials and metals heightened, in 1944, Hakuo sたred a research group for lacquer enamel inlay over metal.

The Second World War was over in 1945 when Hakuo won the Grand Prix at the first post-war national art exhibition Nitten. It was sanctioned by the government of Japan for the promotion of arts and crafts to support export, and demand from overseas expanded. Three more Grand Prix was awarded at the second, the fourth, and the six Nitten Exhibitions between 1946 and 1950, when Hakuo decided to leave the art organizations and start working independently.

=== Etching and lacquer ===
For the first time, Hakuo concentrated on his own ideas and developed the lacquer etching technique which he would name "Shitsuga" Lacquer painting (漆画) in 1950. The thick base layer of lacquer spread over a plate with dry lacquer coat would be etched with a flexible bamboo spatula, thus presenting a semi-three dimensional carving. When dried, the sculptured surface was colored with pigmented lacquer just like an oil painting. While the plate, or the relief was already sculpted, coloring enhanced to mimick the natural features.

That same year in 1950, Hakuo announced the new Lacquer Wood Block Print 漆絵版画 (Urushi-e hanga) by using a plate with dry lacquer finish and lacquer as the printing pigment/ink. It was during that time a block of dry lacquer was curved into a "Lacquer Ink Stone", or Urushi suzuri (漆硯). From 1954 and on, Hakuo's shipment of artworks overseas started to climb up. There were demands in the United States, the United Kingdom, France, Germany, Argentina, Netherlands, and Belgium to start with. A Metal Flower Vase with Inlaid Dry Lacquer was delivered to the Soviet Art Museum, as record tells us as Kanshitsu zōgan makie no kabin (乾漆象嵌蒔絵花瓶).

=== Lacquer painting ===
It was in 1956 when Hakuo started a solo exhibition of "Lacquer paintings" at the Nihonbashi Mitsukoshi Gallery between 13 and 18 November. His show became popular as Mitsukoshi Gallery had his second exhibit of "Lacquer paintings" in 1957 again, then the third from 28 October to 2 November 1958. Solo art shows circulated to art galleries at Kintetsu, Isetan, Odakyu, Daiwa and Tokyu department stores. Shows were held annually at Shiseido Gallery in Ginza, the headquarters' building of Japan Business Federation, the Industry Club of Japan over the following years, totaling to over 30 exhibits held at those venues including the international social functions at the Tokyo American Club which hold membership of over 3,500. Isetan held a larger show in the period of 28 May to 3 June 1965.

=== Reverse glass painting ===
At the age of 71, Hakuo won the "Contemporary Art Contest - Drawings of the Sea" at the occasion of the Okinawa Expo '75. It was a 100 cm broad sized lacquer painting depicting "Whirling tides". To commemorate those thirty years up to 1977, a retrospective exhibition was held at Tokyo Central Museum in Ginza.

Hakuo's interest in glass painting led him to be the guest artist at the Shoto Museum of Art in Shibuya in 1982. His lacquer paintings were offered to be on a long term solo show to the United States at the Pasadena Museum of California Art, with his lacquer paintings the same year.

Finishing a 70 cm tall lacquer painting titled "Akatsuki Fuji" in 1984 for the Tokyo Fuji Art Museum, he joined the "500 Years of Artists inspired by Mount Fuji" exhibition, along with those popular artists including Sesshu Toyo, Ze-an, Tawaraya Sotatsu, Ogata Korin, Maruyama Okyo along with Yokoyama Taikan. The lacquer painting toured to the gallery of Hachioji Sumitomo Insurance Co., Ltd. in 1988 and in 1990 to Aikawa Gallery at Atsugi, Kanagawa Prefecture, while a permanent collection at the Senshindo Gallery in Machida has been on display since 1986 at Machida, Tokyo.

== Legacy ==
Incorporating the disciplines of Japanese traditional paintings and utilizing them for the traditional lacquer crafts, a whole new world of lacquer paintings and lacquer prints was created by the artist and refined over more than half a century. The fame of works and artist was spread immediately domestically and overseas, counting too many renowned celebrities as collectors to listing them here. To name a few, the artist was honoured by the Japanese Emperor, the noble house of Takamatsu-no-miya, Ishibashi-buke, followed by important members of society such as Prime Minister Hayato Ikeda and famous political and business persons worldwide. After some illness, he returned to his atelier in order to complete several unfinished artworks, but died in 1991.

== Celebrity status ==
Some celebrities in possession of Hakuo's works:

1. Elizabeth Taylor
2. Winston Churchill
3. Dwight D. Eisenhower
4. John F. Kennedy
5. Robert F. Kennedy
6. King Albert II of Belgium
7. King Baudouin I of Belgium
8. Mao Tsetung
9. Hugh Hefner
10. Yoshida Shigeru
11. Empress Teimei
12. Rajendra Prasad
13. Sarvepalli Radhakrishnan
14. King Abdul Aziz bin Abdul Rahman Al Saud
15. Haile Selassie I

== Publications ==
- "Iriyama Hakuō gahaku no shōjin" [Hakuō Iriyama and his devotion]. Kokkai. 15 (9(168)). Tokyo: 47–49. October 1962. ISSN 0450-6626.
- Iriyama, Hakuō (1957). Urushi LacquarEtching. Tōkyō: Hakuō Iriyama. OCLC 825732288. - artist's theory
- The Shoto Museum of Art; Ito, Takayasu; Iriyama, Hakuō; Petit, Gaston (1984). Garasu-e : Yōroppa kara ajia eno nagare [Reverse glass painting : From Europe to Asia] (in Japanese). The Shoto Museum of Art. OCLC 704016637. - exhibition catalog
