= Jōhana =

Dissolved municipality in Toyama prefecture, Japan

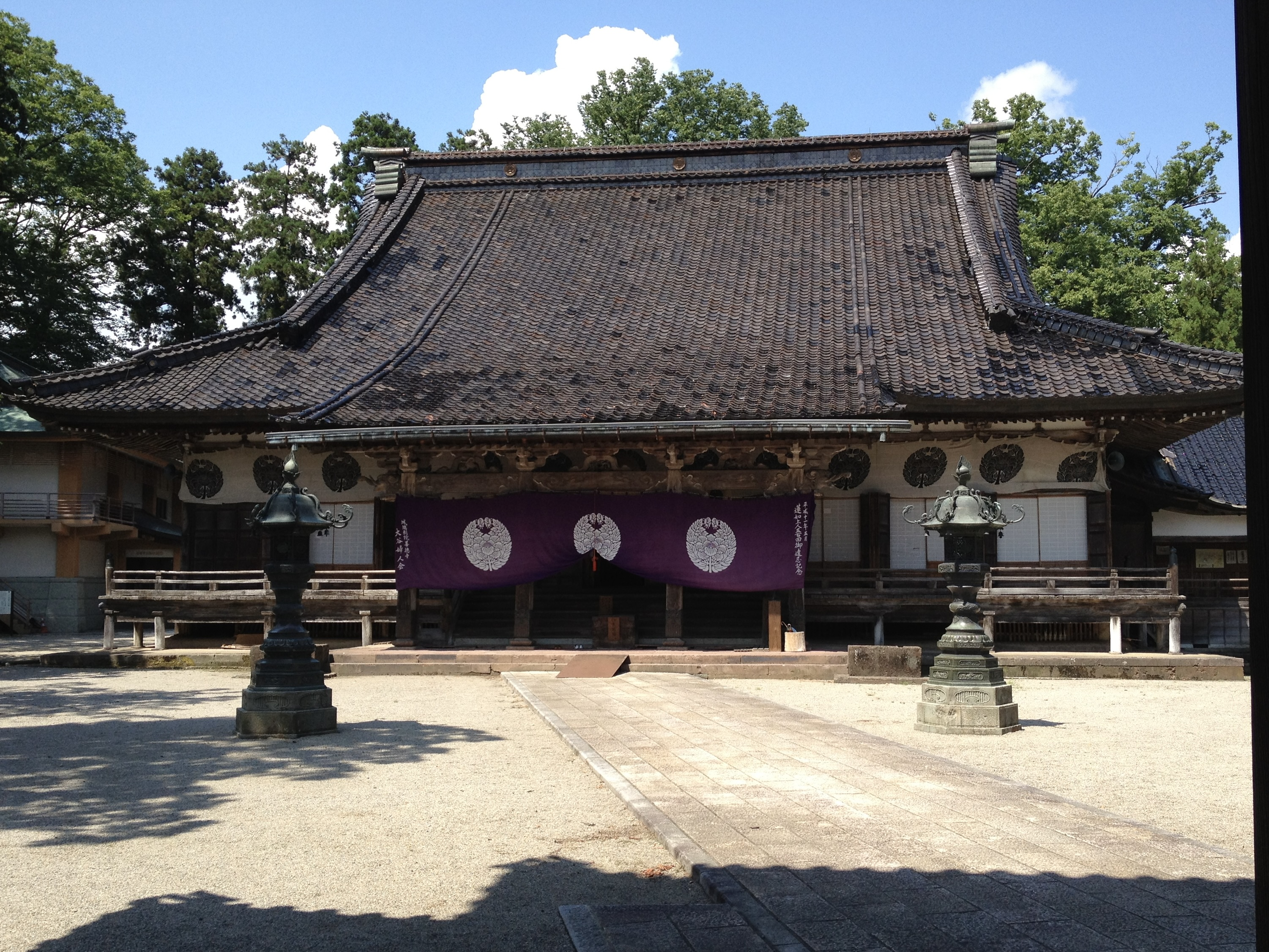
Zentokuji Temple, the center of Jōhana.

Jōhana (城端町, Jōhana-machi) was a town located in Higashitonami District, Toyama Prefecture, Japan.

As of 2003, the town had an estimated population of 9,658 and a population density of 148.52 persons per km^{2}. The total area was 65.03 km^{2}.

Jōhana is a town that developed around Zentokuji Temple.Zentokuji Temple, along with Zuisenji Temple, was the representative temple of Ōtani-ha within Etchū Province.

On November 1, 2004, Jōhana, along with the towns of Fukuno and Inami, the villages of Inokuchi, Kamitaira, Taira and Toga (all from Higashitonami District), and the town of Fukumitsu (from Nishitonami District), was merged to create the city of Nanto.

The town in the anime True Tears is modeled after Jōhana.
