= List of mergers in Aichi Prefecture =

Here is a list of mergers in Aichi Prefecture, Japan.

== Mergers from June 1, 1960 to March 30, 1999 ==
- On 1 June 1961, the towns of Utsumi, Toyohama, Morozaki, and the villages of Shinojima and Himakajima were merged to create the city of Minamichita.
- The town of Katahara is annexed by Gamagōri on 1 April 1962.
- The town of Mutsumi is annexed by Okazaki 15 October 1962.

== Mergers from April 1, 1999 to Present ==
- On August 20, 2003 - the town of Tahara absorbed the town of Akabane (both from Atsumi District) were merged to create new and establish into the city of Tahara.
- On April 1, 2005 - the towns of Heiwa and Sobue (both from Nakashima District) were merged into the expanded city of Inazawa. Nakashima District was dissolved as a result of this merger.
- On April 1, 2005 - the city of Bisai, and the town of Kisogawa (from Haguri District) were merged into the expanded city of Ichinomiya. Haguri District was dissolved as a result of this merger.
- On April 1, 2005 - the towns of Saya and Saori, and the villages of Hachikai and Tatsuta (all from Ama District) were merged to create the city of Aisai.
- On April 1, 2005 - the old city of Toyota absorbed the town of Fujioka, the village of Obara (both from Nishikamo District), the towns of Asahi, Asuke and Inabu, and the village of Shimoyama (all from Higashikamo District) to create new and expanded city of Toyota. Higashikamo District was dissolved as a result of this merger.
- On July 7, 2005 - the former town of Kiyosu absorbed the towns of Nishibiwajima and Shinkawa (all from Nishikasugai District) to create the city of Kiyosu.
- On October 1, 2005 - the village of Tsugu (from Kitashitara District) was merged into the expanded town of Shitara.
- On October 1, 2005 - the town of Atsumi (from Atsumi District) was merged into the expanded city of Tahara. Atsumi District was dissolved as a result of this merger.
- On October 1, 2005 - the old city of Shinshiro absorbed the town of Hōrai, and the village of Tsukude (both from Minamishitara District) to create the new and expanded city of Shinshiro. Minamishitara District was dissolved as a result of this merger.
- On November 27, 2005 - the village of Tomiyama (from Kitashitara District) was merged into the expanded village of Toyone.
- On January 1, 2006 - the old city of Okazaki absorbed the town of Nukata (from Nukata District) to create new and expanded city of Okazaki.
- On February 1, 2006 - the town of Ichinomiya (from Hoi District) was merged into the expanded city of Toyokawa.
- On March 20, 2006 - the towns of Nishiharu and Shikatsu (both from Nishikasugai District) were merged to create the city of Kitanagoya.
- On April 1, 2006 - the town of Yatomi absorbed the village of Jūshiyama (both from Ama District) were merged to create new and establish into the city of Yatomi.
- On January 15, 2008 - the towns of Mito and Otowa (both from Hoi District) were merged into the expanded city of Toyokawa.
- On October 1, 2009 - the town of Haruhi (from Nishikasugai District) was merged into the expanded city of Kiyosu, leaving Nishikasugai District with only one municipality.
- On January 4, 2010 - the town of Miyoshi (from Nishikamo District) was elevated to city status. Nishikamo District was dissolved as a result of this merger.
- On February 1, 2010 - the town of Kozakai (from Hoi District) was merged into the expanded city of Toyokawa. Hoi District was dissolved as a result of this merger.
- On March 22, 2010 - the towns of Jimokuji, Miwa and Shippō (all from Ama District) were merged to create the city of Ama.
- On April 1, 2011 - the towns of Hazu, Isshiki and Kira (all from Hazu District) were merged into the expanded city of Nishio. Hazu District was dissolved as a result of this merger.
- On January 4, 2012 - the town of Nagakute (from Aichi District) was elevated to city status; leaving Aichi District with only one municipality.

== Planned/Future Mergers ==
There are no planned mergers in Aichi Prefecture as of April 2024, but there are some concepts and failed attempts.

- The town of Higashiura attempted to be elevated to city status, but failed due to data padding boosting the population count to meet requirements being exposed.
- The towns of Minamichita and Mihama attempted to merge into the city of Minami-Centrair, but failed due to heavy backlash from the residents, due to the fact that Chubu Centrair International Airport is located in Tokoname, and that the name was far different from the names that the local residents proposed.
- A referendum was held if the town of Agui should merge into the city of Handa, but failed due to low support from locals.
