= Aichi 14th district =

Legislative district of Japan

- Parliamentary constituency for the Japanese House of Representatives
- Numbered map of Aichi Prefecture single-member districts
- Prefecture: Aichi
- Proportional District: Tokai
- Electorate: 292,069

Current constituency
- Created: 1994
- Seats: One
- Party: Liberal Democratic
- Representative: Soichiro Imaeda
- Municipalities: Toyokawa, Gamagōri, and Shinshiro, Nukata District and Kitashitara District.

Aichi 14th district (愛知県第14区, Aichi-ken dai-ju-yonku; or simply 愛知14区, Aichi-ken ju-yonku) is a single-member constituency of the House of Representatives in the national Diet of Japan located in Aichi Prefecture.

== Areas covered ==
=== Since 2022 ===
- Toyokawa
- Gamagōri
- Shinshiro
- Nukata District
- Kitashitara District

=== 2017 - 2022 ===
- Part of Toyota
  - Former Inabu Area
- Toyokawa
- Gamagōri
- Shinshiro
- Nukata District
- Kitashitara District

=== 2013 - 2017 ===
- Part of Toyota
  - Former Inabu Area
- Toyokawa
- Gamagōri
- Shinshiro
- Kitashitara District

=== 1994 - 2013 ===
- Toyokawa
- Gamagōri
- Shinshiro
- Kitashitara District
- Minamishitara District
- Hoi District

== List of representatives ==
Election	Representative	Party	Notes
1996	Katsuhito Asano	Liberal Democratic	
2000	Katsuhito Asano	Liberal Democratic	
2003	Katsumasa Suzuki	Democratic	
2005	Katsumasa Suzuki	Democratic	
2009	Katsumasa Suzuki	Democratic	
2009	Katsumasa Suzuki	People's Life First	
2009	Katsumasa Suzuki	Tomorrow	
2012	Soichiro Imaeda	Liberal Democratic	
2014	Soichiro Imaeda	Liberal Democratic	
2017	Soichiro Imaeda	Liberal Democratic	
2021	Soichiro Imaeda	Liberal Democratic	
2024	Soichiro Imaeda	Liberal Democratic	
2026	Soichiro Imaeda	Liberal Democratic	

== Election results ==
=== 2026 ===
2026
Party	Candidate	Votes	%	±%
LDP	Soichiro Imaeda (incumbent)	119,376	67.4	▲12.7
Centrist Reform	Rie Ohtake	48,753	28.1	▼11.1
JCP	Daisuke Asao	7,904	4.5	▼1.6
Registered electors		287,106		
Turnout			63.01	▲4.71
LDP hold				

=== 2024 ===
2024
Party	Candidate	Votes	%	±%
Liberal Democratic	Soichiro Imaeda (incumbent)	90,334	54.73	▼8.23
CDP	Rie Ohtake (elected in Tōkai PR block)	64,763	39.23	▲6.43
Communist	Daisuke Asao	9,970	6.04	▲1.80
Majority		25,571	15.50	▼14.66
Registered electors		289,546		
Turnout			58.30	▼3.96
LDP hold				

=== 2021 ===
2021
Party	Candidate	Votes	%	±%
Liberal Democratic (endorsed by Komeito)	Soichiro Imaeda (incumbent)	114,160	62.96	
CDP	Katsunori Tanaka	59,462	32.80	New
Communist	Yasuyuki Nozawa	7,689	4.24	
Majority		54,698	30.16	
Registered electors		296,452		
Turnout			62.26	▲2.49
LDP hold				

=== 2017 ===
2017
Party	Candidate	Votes	%	±%
Liberal Democratic (endorsed by Komeito)	Soichiro Imaeda (incumbent)	96,303	55.27	
Kibō no Tō	Katsunori Tanaka	60,955	34.99	New
Communist	Nobuyuki Kinbara	16,969	9.74	
Majority		35,348	20.28	
Registered electors		298,566		
Turnout			59.77	▼0.76
LDP hold				

=== 2014 ===
2014
Party	Candidate	Votes	%	±%
Liberal Democratic (endorsed by Komeito)	Soichiro Imaeda (incumbent)	77,513	50.17	
Democratic (endorsed by PLP)	Katsumasa Suzuki (PR seat incumbent) (won PR seat)	62,103	40.20	
Communist	Tomiji Hakamada	14,872	9.63	
Majority		15,410	9.97	
Registered electors		262,144		
Turnout			60.53	▼2.70
LDP hold				

=== 2012 ===
2012
Party	Candidate	Votes	%	±%
Liberal Democratic	Soichiro Imaeda	71,881	44.75	
Tomorrow (endorsed by Daichi)	Katsumasa Suzuki (incumbent) (won PR seat)	59,353	36.95	New
Democratic (endorsed by PNP)	Kayoko Isogai (PR seat incumbent)	20,124	12.53	
Communist	Toshio Inō	9,283	5.78	N/A
Majority		12,528	7.80	
Registered electors		263,426		
Turnout			63.23	▼11.17
LDP gain from Tomorrow				

=== 2009 ===
2009
Party	Candidate	Votes	%	±%
Democratic	Katsumasa Suzuki (incumbent)	117,085	60.68	
Liberal Democratic	Motoshi Sugita (PR seat incumbent)	70,564	36.57	
Happiness Realization	Hidefumi Suzuki	5,304	2.75	New
Majority		46,521	24.11	
Registered electors		265,069		
Turnout			74.40	▲2.24
Democratic hold				

=== 2005 ===
2005
Party	Candidate	Votes	%	±%
Democratic	Katsumasa Suzuki (incumbent)	97,382	52.17	
Liberal Democratic	Motoshi Sugita (won PR seat)	78,561	42.09	
Communist	Kenichiro Kuritani	10,713	5.74	
Majority		18,821	10.08	
Registered electors		263,654		
Turnout			72.16	▲3.50
Democratic hold				

=== 2003 ===
2003
Party	Candidate	Votes	%	±%
Democratic	Katsumasa Suzuki	91,713	51.95	
Liberal Democratic	Katsuhito Asano (incumbent)	76,019	43.06	
Communist	Masami Kaneko	8,795	4.98	
Majority		15,694	8.89	
Registered electors		262,172		
Turnout			68.66	
Democratic gain from LDP				

=== 2000 ===
2000
Party	Candidate	Votes	%	±%
Liberal Democratic	Katsuhito Asano (incumbent)	67,256	37.83	
Independent	Katsumasa Suzuki	64,736	36.41	New
Democratic	Yoshitaka Yoda	31,655	17.80	New
Communist	Norihiro Nogami	12,211	6.87	
Independent	Kunio Ōyama	1,016	0.57	New
Liberal League	Takao Uchiyama	917	0.52	New
Majority		2,520	1.42	
Turnout				
LDP hold				

=== 1996 ===
1996
Party	Candidate	Votes	%	±%
Liberal Democratic	Katsuhito Asano	72,661	49.81	New
New Frontier	Kazuo Yoshitomi	44,421	30.45	New
Communist	Kenichiro Kuritani	14,646	10.04	New
Democratic	Chiaki Fujikawa	14,149	9.70	New
Majority		28,240	19.36	
Turnout				
LDP win (new seat)				
