= Aichi 11th district =

Legislative district of Japan

- Parliamentary constituency for the Japanese House of Representatives
- Numbered map of Aichi Prefecture single-member districts
- Prefecture: Aichi
- Proportional District: Tokai
- Electorate: 385,006

Current constituency
- Created: 1994
- Seats: One
- Party: DPP
- Representative: Midori Tanno
- Municipalities: Miyoshi and Toyota.

Aichi 11th district (愛知県第11区, Aichi-ken dai-ju-ikku or simply 愛知11区, Aichi-ken ju-ikku) is a single-member constituency of the House of Representatives in the national Diet of Japan located in Aichi Prefecture.

== Areas covered ==
=== since 2022 ===
- Miyoshi
- Toyota

=== 2013 - 2022 ===
- Miyoshi
- Part of Toyota

=== 1994 - 2013 ===
- Toyota
- Higashikamo District
- Nishikamo District

== List of representatives ==
Election	Representative	Party	Notes
1996	Eisei Itō	New Frontier	
1996	Eisei Itō	New Fraternity	
2000	Eisei Itō	Democratic	
2003	Shinichiro Furumoto	Democratic	
2005	Shinichiro Furumoto	Democratic	
2009	Shinichiro Furumoto	Democratic	
2012	Shinichiro Furumoto	Democratic	
2014	Shinichiro Furumoto	Democratic	
2014	Shinichiro Furumoto	Democratic	
2017	Shinichiro Furumoto	Kibō no Tō	
2017	Shinichiro Furumoto	DPP	
2017	Shinichiro Furumoto	Independent	
2021	Tetsuya Yagi	LDP	
2024	Midori Tanno	DPP	
2026	Midori Tanno	DPP	

== Election results ==
=== 2026 ===
2026
Party	Candidate	Votes	%	±%
DPP	Midori Tanno	145,739	59.7	▲2.8
LDP	Tadamori Fujisawa (elected in Tōkai PR block)	98,411	40.3	▲1.9
Registered electors		381,041		
Turnout			66.57	▲3.25
DPP hold				

=== 2024 ===
2024
Party	Candidate	Votes	%	±%
DPP	Midori Tanno	134,528	56.9	
LDP	Tetsuya Yagi	90,844	38.4	▼31.7
JCP	Kazuo Ueda	11,105	4.7	▼11.4
Registered electors		382,181		
Turnout			63.32	▲0.52
DPP gain from LDP				

=== 2021 ===
2021
Party	Candidate	Votes	%	±%
Liberal Democratic	Tetsuya Yagi (PR seat incumbent)	158,018	69.07	
Communist	Nobuhiro Honda	36,788	16.08	
Independent	Tadashi Umemura	33,990	14.86	New
Majority		121,230	52.99	
Registered electors		383,834		
Turnout			62.80	▼3.74
LDP gain from Independent				

=== 2017 ===
2017
Party	Candidate	Votes	%	±%
Kibō no Tō	Shinichiro Furumoto (incumbent)	134,698	53.80	New
Liberal Democratic (endorsed by Komeito)	Tetsuya Yagi (PR seat incumbent) (won PR seat)	96,978	38.74	
Communist	Nobuhiro Honda	18,685	7.46	
Majority		37,720	15.06	
Registered electors		384,438		
Turnout			66.54	▼0.41
Kibō no Tō hold				

=== 2014 ===
2014
Party	Candidate	Votes	%	±%
Democratic	Shinichiro Furumoto (incumbent)	126,498	52.59	
Liberal Democratic	Tetsuya Yagi (PR seat incumbent) (won PR seat)	97,167	40.39	
Communist	Mitsuo Makita	16,883	7.02	
Majority		29,331	12.20	
Registered electors		369,434		
Turnout			66.95	▼2.80
Democratic hold				

=== 2012 ===
2012
Party	Candidate	Votes	%	±%
Democratic (endorsed by PNP)	Shinichiro Furumoto (incumbent)	126,724	51.86	
Liberal Democratic (endorsed by Komeito)	Tetsuya Yagi (won PR seat)	91,164	37.31	
Communist	Hiroshi Watanabe	14,670	6.00	N/A
Happiness Realization	Hiromi Nakane	11,807	4.83	
Majority		35,560	14.55	
Registered electors		367,599		
Turnout			69.75	▼8.83
Democratic hold				

=== 2009 ===
2009
Party	Candidate	Votes	%	±%
Democratic	Shinichiro Furumoto (incumbent)	177,350	64.02	
Liberal Democratic	Masaki Doi (PR seat incumbent)	91,334	32.97	
Happiness Realization	Hiromi Nakane	8,326	3.01	New
Majority		86,016	31.05	
Registered electors		362,700		
Turnout			78.13	▲3.13
Democratic hold				

=== 2005 ===
2005
Party	Candidate	Votes	%	±%
Democratic	Shinichiro Furumoto (incumbent)	132,730	52.29	
Liberal Democratic	Masaki Doi (won PR seat)	105,631	41.62	N/A
Communist	Nobuko Motomura	15,468	6.09	
Majority		27,099	10.67	
Registered electors		346,484		
Turnout			75.00	▲7.75
Democratic hold				

=== 2003 ===
2003
Party	Candidate	Votes	%	±%
Democratic	Shinichiro Furumoto	181,747	89.56	
Communist	Shingo Kushida	21,179	10.44	
Majority		160,568	79.12	
Registered electors		338,755		
Turnout			67.25	
Democratic hold				

=== 2000 ===
2000
Party	Candidate	Votes	%	±%
Democratic	Eisei Ito (incumbent)	130,473	57.56	New
Liberal Democratic	Akiko Yamanaka (PR seat incumbent)	79,910	35.25	
Communist	Yoshiatsu Sato	13,862	6.12	
Liberal League	Isamu Shiozawa	2,422	1.07	New
Majority		50,563	22.31	
Turnout				
Democratic hold				

=== 1996 ===
1996
Party	Candidate	Votes	%	±%
New Frontier	Eisei Ito	123,404	55.48	New
Liberal Democratic	Yasuoki Urano	85,766	38.56	New
Communist	Yoshinori Ōmura	13,260	5.96	New
Majority		37,638	16.92	
Turnout				
New Frontier win (new seat)				
