= Shitara =

Shitara (written: 設楽) is a Japanese surname. Notable people with the surname include:

- Osamu Shitara (設楽 統, born 1973), Japanese comedian and television presenter

== See also ==
- Shitara, Aichi, town located in Kitashitara District, Aichi Prefecture, Japan.
