= Nukata =

Nukata may refer to:

- Nukata District
- Nukata Prefecture
- Nukata, Aichi
- Princess Nukata
