= Hachiya, Fukuoka =

Dissolved municipality in Fukuoka prefecture, Japan

Hachiya (八屋町, Hachiya-machi) was a town located in Chikujō District, Fukuoka Prefecture. On 10 April 1955, the town merged with 8 villages to form the city of Unoshima. 4 days later, the city was renamed to the city of Buzen.

== History ==
- 1 April 1889 - Due to the municipal status enforcement, the town of Hachiya was formed within Kōge District.
- 26 February 1896 - Kōge District merged with Tsuiki District to become Chikujō District.
- 1 April 1935 - Merged with the town of Unoshima to become the town of Hachiya.
- 10 April 1955 - The town of Hachiya and the surrounding 8 villages merged to form the city of Unoshima. The town of Hachiya dissolves.
- 14 April 1955 - The city's name was renamed to the city of Buzen.

== See also ==
- List of dissolved municipalities of Japan
- Unoshima, Fukuoka
- Buzen, Fukuoka
