= Tetsuya Yagi =

Japanese politician

- 八木 哲也
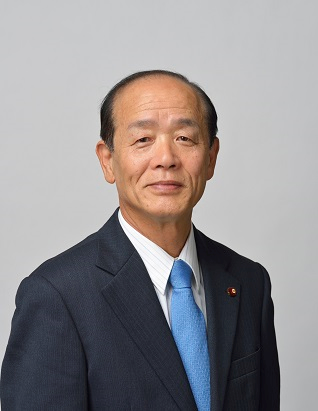
- Official portrait, 2019

Member of the House of Representatives
- In office 17 December 2012 – 9 October 2024
- Preceded by: Multi-member district
- Succeeded by: Midori Tanno
- Constituency: Tōkai PR (2012–2021); Aichi 11th (2021–2024)

Member of the Toyota City Council
- In office 30 April 1999 – 2012

Personal details
- Born: 10 August 1947 (age 79) Takahashi, Aichi, Japan
- Party: Liberal Democratic
- Education: Chuo University
- Website: Tetsuya Yagi website

Tetsuya Yagi (八木 哲也, Yagi Tetsuya; born 10 August 1947) is a Japanese politician of the Liberal Democratic Party, who served as a member of the House of Representatives.

== Early years ==
Yagi was born in Takahashi, Nishikamo District, Aichi Prefecture. His father was a member of the Toyota City Council.

Yagi graduated from Chuo University's Faculty of Science and Engineering in 1972 and then lived a wandering life in various parts of India.

In 1974, Yagi joined Kojima Industries Corporation, where he worked until 1998.

== Political career ==
In 1999, Yagi ran for the Toyota City Council and was elected.

Yagi resigned as a member of the Toyota City Council and ran for Aichi 11th district in the 2012 general election. As a result, he lost to DPJ incumbent Shinichiro Furumoto and won a seat in Tōkai PR.

In the 2014 general election, Yagi lost to DPJ's Furumoto and won a seat in Tōkai PR.

In the 2017 general election, Yagi lost to Kibō’s Furumoto and won a seat in Tōkai PR.

In 2019, Yagi was appointed to Parliamentary Vice-Minister for the Environment in the Fourth Abe Second reshuffled cabinet.

In the 2020 LDP presidential election, Yagi endorsed Shigeru Ishiba as a recommender.

On 17 October 2020, Yagi announced his retirement at a meeting with supporters. However, on 30 May 2021, Yagi withdrew his retirement and announced his candidacy for the next general election because he could not find a successor.

In the 2021 general election, Furumoto announced his retirement at the request of the Toyota Workers' Union, which supported him that had been competing for Aichi 11th's seat with Yagi. Yagi defeated JCP candidate and gain Aichi 11th's seat for the first time.

In 2023, Yagi was appointed to State Minister of Environment in the Second Kishida Second reshuffled cabinet.

In the 2024 LDP presidential election, Yagi endorsed Ishiba as a recommender again. After Ishiba was elected to the PM, he was re-appointed to State Minister of Environment in the First Ishiba cabinet.

In the 2024 general election, Yagi lost to DPP's Midori Tanno and lost re-election.
