= Motoshi =

- Gender: Male

Origin
- Origin: Japanese
- Meaning: Different meanings depending on the kanji used

Motoshi (written: 元司) is a masculine Japanese given name. Notable people with the name include:

- Motoshi Fujita (藤田 元司; 1931–2006), Japanese baseball player and manager
- Motoshi Sugita (杉田 元司; born 1951), Japanese politician
