= Nobutaka =

- Gender: Male

Origin
- Origin: Japanese
- Meaning: Different meanings depending on the kanji used

Nobutaka (written: 信孝, 信教, 信隆, 延孝 or 伸貴) is a masculine Japanese given name. Notable people with the name include:

- Nobutaka Hirano (平野 信孝; born 1972), Japanese volleyball player
- Nobutaka Hirokawa (廣川 信隆; born 1946), Japanese neuroscientist and cell biologist
- Nobutaka Machimura (町村 信孝; born 1944), Japanese politician
- Oda Nobutaka (織田 信孝; 1558–1583), Japanese samurai
- Nobutaka Shiōden (四王天 延孝; 1878–1962), Japanese general
- Nobutaka Suzuki (鈴木 伸貴; born 1983), Japanese footballer
- Nobutaka Taguchi (田口 信教; born 1951), Japanese swimmer
- Nobutaka Tanaka (田中 信孝; born 1971), Japanese footballer
- Nobutaka Tsutsui (筒井 信隆; born 1944), Japanese politician
- Nobutaka Imamura (今村 信貴; born), Japanese baseball player
