= Unoshima, Fukuoka =

Dissolved municipality in Fukuoka prefecture, Japan

Unoshima (宇島町, Unoshima-machi) was a town located in Chikujō District, Fukuoka Prefecture. In March 1935, the town merged with the town of Hachiya and dissolved. The town is now part of the city of Buzen.

== History ==
- 1889 - Due to the municipal status enforcement, the town of Unoshima was formed within Kōge District.
- 1896 - Tsuiki and Kōge Districts merged to form Chikujō District.
- 1935 - Merged with the town of Hachiya to form the town of Hachiya. The town of Unoshima dissolves.
- 1955 - The town of Hachiya and 8 villages merged to form the city of Unoshima. 4 days later, it was renamed to the city of Buzen.

== See also ==
- List of dissolved municipalities of Japan
- Hachiya, Fukuoka
- Buzen, Fukuoka
