= Soichiro Imaeda =

Japanese politician (born 1984)

- 今枝 宗一郎
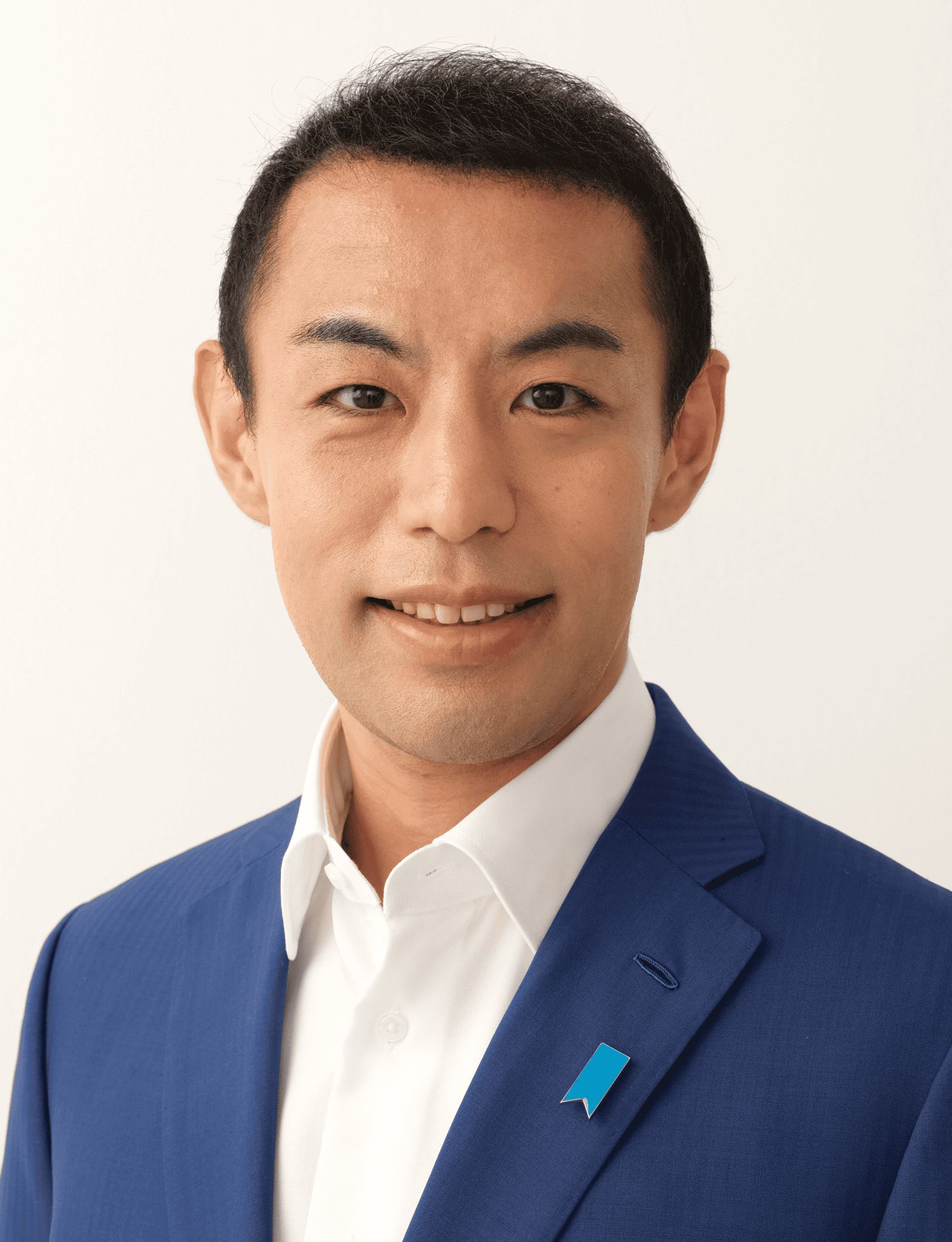
- Official portrait, 2025

Member of the House of Representatives
- Incumbent
- Assumed office 18 December 2012
- Preceded by: Katsumasa Suzuki
- Constituency: Aichi 14th

Personal details
- Born: 18 February 1984 (age 42) Aichi Prefecture, Japan
- Party: Liberal Democratic (Shikōkai)
- Education: Nagoya University

Soichiro Imaeda (今枝宗一郎, Imaeda Soichiro; born 18 February 1984) is a Japanese politician serving as a member of the House of Representatives since 2012. He was the youngest member elected in the 2012 general election.
