= Toei =

Toei or Tōei may refer to:

- Tōei, Aichi, Japan
- Toei Company (Tōei), Japanese film and television production company
  - Toei Animation, their animation subsidiary
- Toei (都営), Japanese abbreviation meaning "operated by the Tokyo Metropolitan Government"
  - Transportation lines operated by the Tokyo Metropolitan Bureau of Transportation (TMBT)
    - Toei Subway (都営地下鉄)
    - Toei Bus (都営バス)
  - Toei Jūtaku (都営住宅), public housing owned and managed by the Bureau of Urban Development, Tokyo Metropolitan Government
