= Tsugu =

Tsugu 津具村
- Former municipality
- Flag Seal

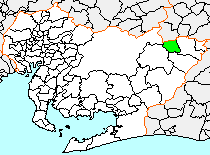
- Location of Tsugu in Aichi Prefecture
- Country: Japan
- Region: Chūbu (Tōkai)
- Prefecture: Aichi Prefecture
- District: Kitashitara
- Merged: October 1, 2005 (now part of Shitara)

Area
  - Total: 53.13 km^{2} (20.51 sq mi)

Population (October 1, 2004)
  - Total: 1,553
  - Density: 29.3/km^{2} (76/sq mi)
- Time zone: UTC+09:00 (JST)
- Symbols
- Bird: Japanese bush-warbler
- Flower: Chamaecyparis obtusa

Tsugu (津具村, Tsugu-mura) was a village located in Kitashitara District, Aichi Prefecture, Japan.

As of May 1, 2004, the village had an estimated population of 1,553 and a density of 29.3 persons per km^{2}. The total area was 53.13 km^{2}.

== Geography ==
Tsugu was located at the extreme northeast corner of Aichi Prefecture, in an area of 1000-meter mountains. Some 90 percent of the village area was covered in mountains and forest.

== History ==
Kamitsugu and Shimotsugu villages were created on April 1, 1889, within Kitashitara District, but were administered jointly from 1903 to 1922. On September 30, 1956, the two villages officially merged to form Tsugu Village.

On October 1, 2005, Tsugu was merged into the expanded town of Shitara, and has ceased to exist as an independent municipality.
