= Shinichiro Furumoto =

Japanese politician

- 古本 伸一郎
- Official portrait, 2009

Member of the House of Representatives
- In office 9 November 2003 – 14 October 2021
- Preceded by: Eisei Itō
- Succeeded by: Tetsuya Yagi
- Constituency: Aichi 11th

Personal details
- Born: 11 March 1965 (age 61) Takamatsu, Kagawa, Japan
- Party: Independent (since 2020)
- Other political affiliations: DPJ (before 2016); DP (2016–2017); KnT (2017–2018); DPP (2018–2020)
- Education: Ritsumeikan University

Shinichiro Furumoto (古本 伸一郎, Furumoto Shinichirō; born 11 March 1965) is a former Japanese politician of the Democratic Party of Japan, who served as a member of the House of Representatives in the Diet (national legislature).

A native of Takamatsu, Kagawa and graduate of Ritsumeikan University, he was elected to the House of Representatives for the first time in 2003. As a member of the Diet, he represents the 11th District of Aichi prefecture, which includes the cities of Toyota and Miyoshi.
