= Aichi Prefectural Asahigaoka Senior High School =

- 愛知県立旭丘高等学校

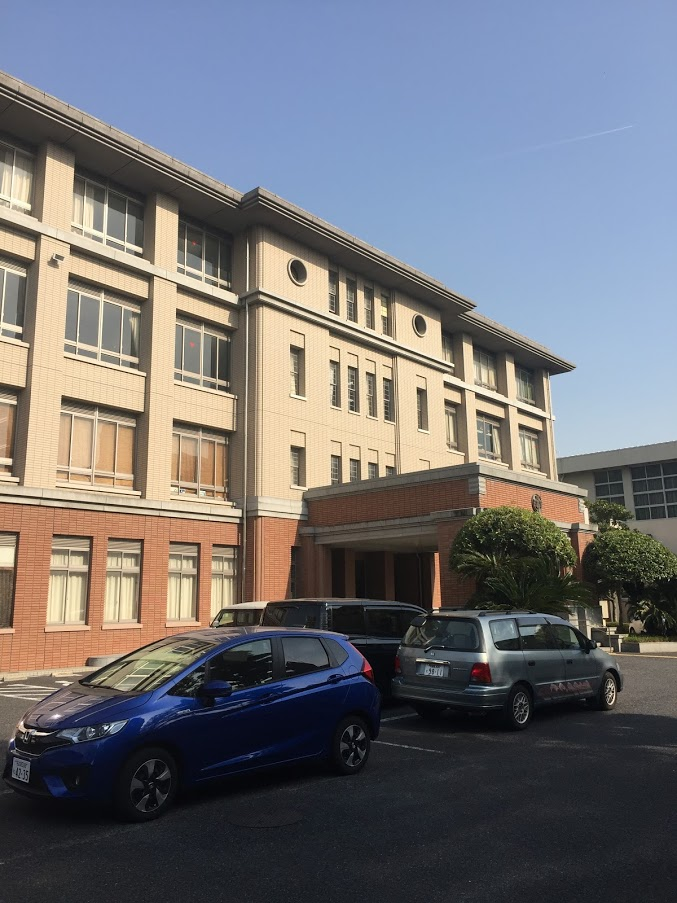
- The front of the school building, 2018

Location
- Nagoya City, Aichi Prefecture; Japan; 35°11′1.78″N 136°56′22.51″E

Information
- Former name: Aichi Prefectural No.1 Middle School; Nagoya No.3 Girl High School
- Type: Public
- Motto: 正義を重んぜよ 運動を愛せよ 徹底を期せよ (Respect justice Love sports Be constantly)
- Established: 1870; 156 years ago
- Principal: Masazuki Sugiyama
- Grades: 10-12
- Gender: coeducational
- Age range: 15-18
- Language: Japanese
- Colors: Wine-red
- Website: asahigaoka-h.aichi-c.ed.jp/index.htm

Aichi Prefectural Asahigaoka Senior High School (Japanese: 愛知県立旭丘高等学校) is a public coeducational senior high school located in Nagoya city, Aichi prefecture, Japan. It was originally established in 1870, having a long history of more than 140 years. As of 2019, it had about 1200 students in years 10 to 12. The school was named "Aichi Prefectural No.1 Middle School" before World War II. In 1948, following the reformation of the education system, the school was merged with Nagoya No.3 Girl High School and renamed as "Aichi Prefectural Asahigaoka Senior High School".

== School outline ==
=== Curriculum and Course ===
Full-time Curriculum (2 courses)

- General Course
- Art Course

Half-day Curriculum (Night, 1 course) (Student admission will be closed for good from 2020)

- General Course

=== Motto ===
Respect justice

Love sports

Be Constantly

=== School song ===
The school's song was created by Kiyoshi Nobutoki and written by Japanese litterateur Senichi Hisamatsu, who was a graduate of the school. It was adopted in 1952.

== Student clubs and extracurricular programs ==
=== Full-time Curriculum ===
==== Cultural Clubs ====
- Astronomy club
- Band music club
- Electrical club
- Go and shogi club
- light music club
- Reading club
- Theater drama club
- String music club
- Photo club
- Calligraphy club
- Radio broadcasting club
- Biology club
- Chorus club
- Railway study club
- Film club
- Karuta club
- Mathematical Science club
- Quiz study club
- Fire Torch club
- E.S.S. (English Speaking society) club

==== Sports Clubs ====
- Baseball club
- Soft baseball Club (Japanese version of baseball played with a hard rubber ball)
- Tennis club (Boys and girls)
- Soft tennis club (Boys and girls)
- Volleyball club (Boys and girls)
- Basketball club (man and woman)
- Badminton club (Boys and girls)
- Handball club (Boys and girls)
- Rugby club
- Soccer club (Boys and girls)
- Dance club
- Table tennis club
- Judo club
- Archery club
- Kendo club
- Athletics club
- Rowing club
- Swimming club
- Wandervogel club

=== Half-time curriculum ===
- Basketball club
- Badminton club

== Gallery ==
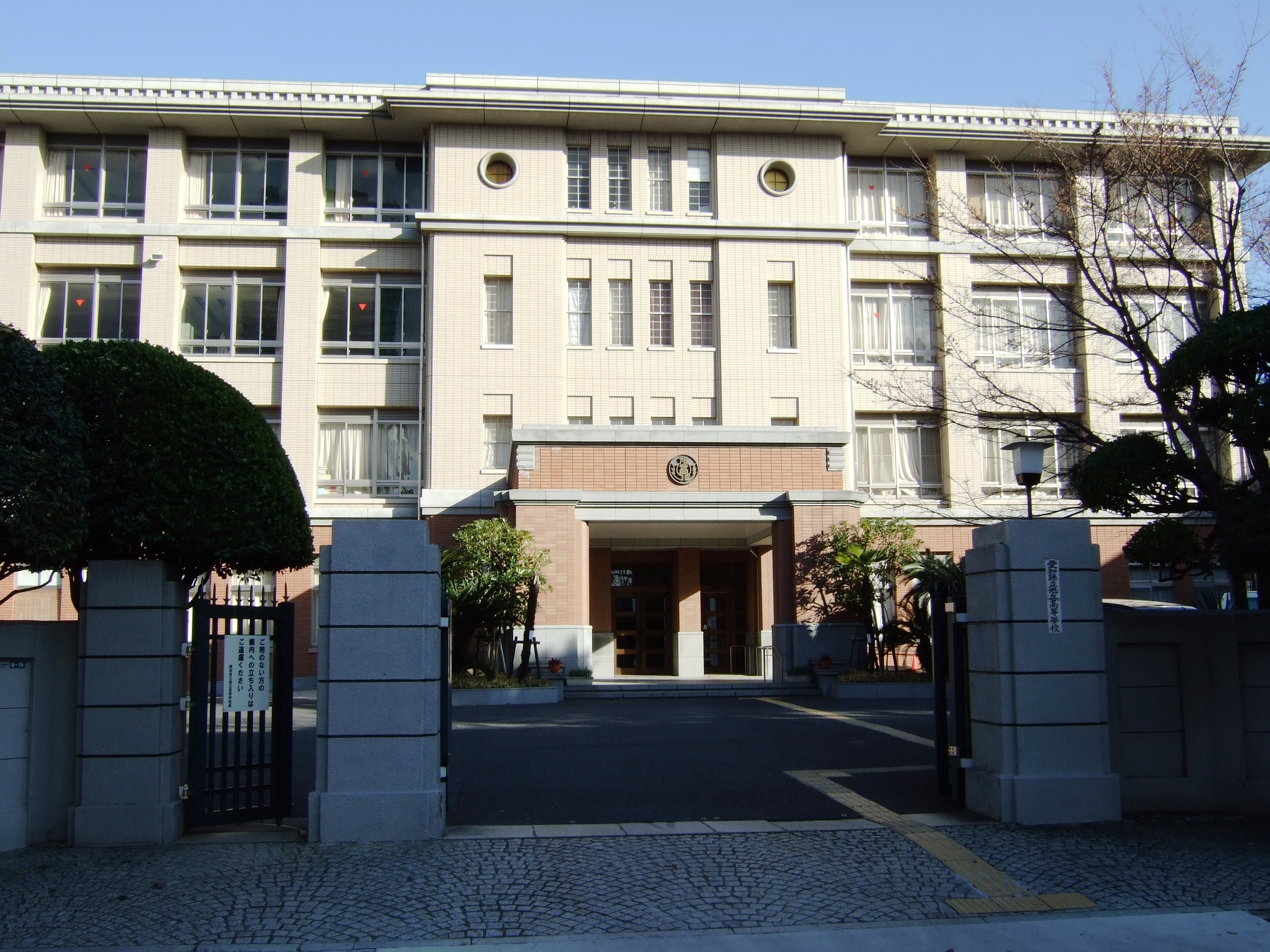
The school in 2008

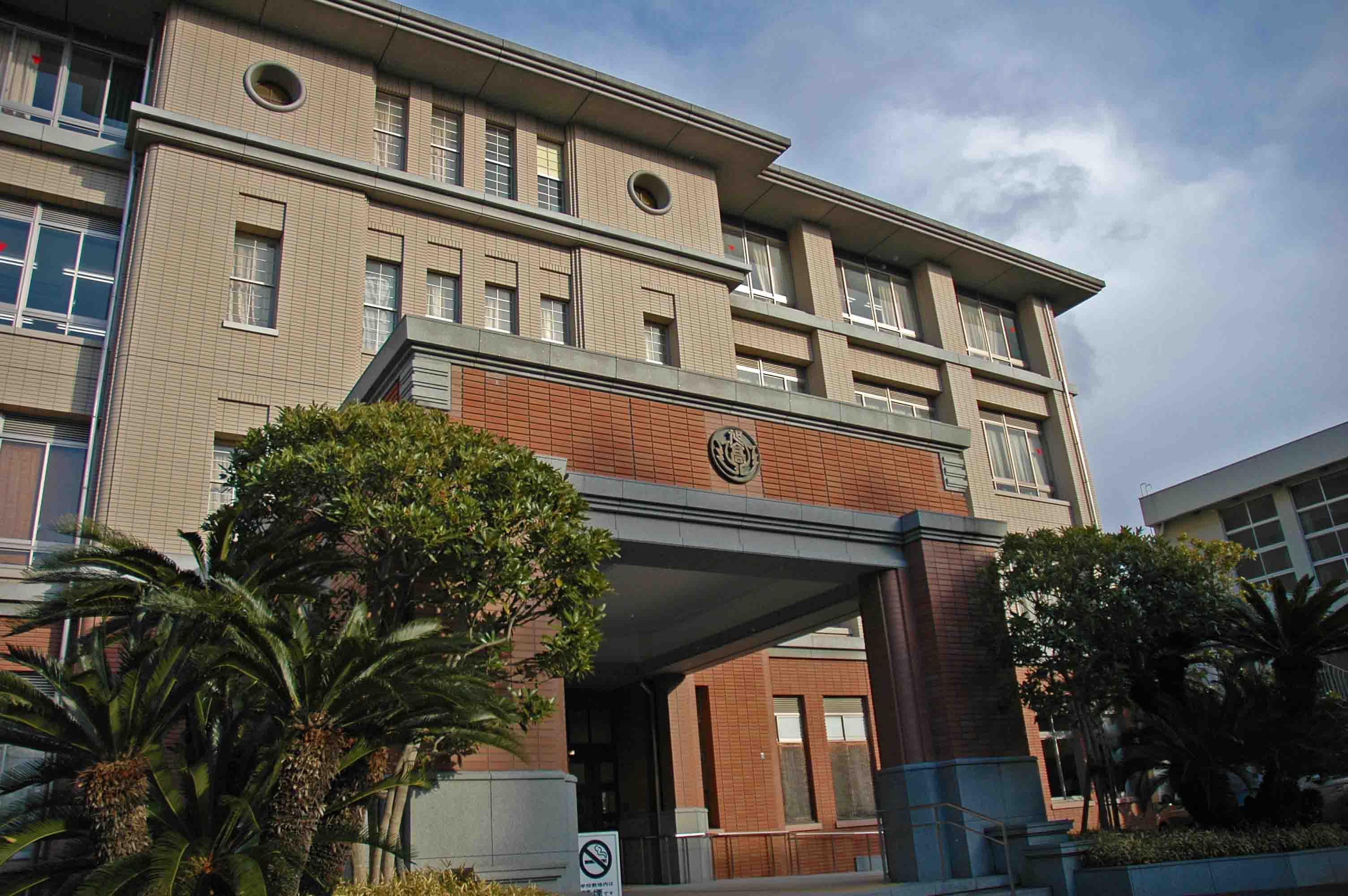
Front of the school in 2015

== Notable people ==
- Midori Tanno, announcer and politician
- Takeshi Uchiyamada
- Akio Morita
- Katō Takaaki
- Futabatei Shimei
- Tsubouchi Shōyō
- Kohei Otsuka
- Genpei Akasegawa
- Miyoko Akaza
- Masaki Tsuji
- Kogo Noda
- Tsuneko Okazaki
- Takashi Kawamura (politician) (mayor of Nagoya, 2009–present)
