= Katsuhito Asano =

Japanese politician (born 1938)

- 浅野 勝人
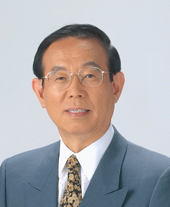
- Official portrait, 2008

Deputy Chief Cabinet Secretary (Political affairs, House of Councillors)
- In office 13 May 2009 – 16 September 2009
- Prime Minister: Tarō Asō
- Preceded by: Yoshitada Konoike
- Succeeded by: Koji Matsui

Member of the House of Councillors
- In office 26 July 2004 – 25 July 2010
- Preceded by: Hiroko Hatta
- Succeeded by: Masahito Fujikawa
- Constituency: Aichi at-large

Member of the House of Representatives
- In office 20 October 1996 – 10 October 2003
- Preceded by: Constituency established
- Succeeded by: Katsumasa Suzuki
- Constituency: Aichi 14th
- In office 18 February 1990 – 18 June 1993
- Preceded by: Sen'ichirō Uemura
- Succeeded by: Yutaka Kondō
- Constituency: Aichi 5th

Personal details
- Born: 19 April 1938 (age 88) Toyohashi, Aichi, Japan
- Party: Liberal Democratic
- Education: Waseda University

Katsuhito Asano (浅野 勝人, Asano Katsuhito; born April 19, 1938) is a retired Japanese politician of the Liberal Democratic Party, who served as a member of the House of Councillors and the House of Representatives in the Diet (national legislature). He represented the 14th district of Aichi Prefecture, which includes the cities of Toyokawa, Gamagori, and Shinshiro.

A native of Toyohashi, Aichi and graduate of Waseda University, he was elected for the first time in 1990 after working at the public broadcaster NHK.
