= Mitsuzo Sasaki =

Japanese author

Mitsuzo Sasaki (佐々木 味津三, Sasaki Mitsuzō, March 18, 1896 – February 6, 1934) was a Japanese writer. His Umon Detective Story (右門捕物帖, Umon torimonochō) stories were adapted into a series of films by Toho in the 1950s.

He was born in Shitara, Aichi.

== See also ==
- Japanese literature
- List of Japanese authors
