= Midori Tanno =

Japanese female announcer and politician (1973-)

- 丹野 みどり

Member of the House of Representatives
- Incumbent
- Assumed office October 29, 2024
- Preceded by: Tetsuya Yagi
- Constituency: Aichi 11th

Personal details
- Born: July 3, 1973 (age 53) Nagoya, Aichi, Japan
- Party: Democratic Party For the People
- Education: Aichi Prefectural Asahigaoka Senior High School
- Alma mater: Bachelor of Social Psychology, Nagoya University
- Occupation: Announcer and Politician
- Website: Official Website

Midori Tanno (丹野 みどり; born July 3, 1973) is a politician from Aichi Prefecture and a former freelance announcer. She sits in the House of Representatives as a member of the Democratic Party For the People.

== Early life ==
Born in Nagoya, Aichi Prefecture on Jul 3, 1973. She graduated from Nagoya Municipal Inoko Junior High School, Aichi Prefectural Asahigaoka Senior High School, and Nagoya University, Faculty of Letters, Department of Social Psychology.

== Media career ==
In 1999, while working as a CBC announcer, she was a member of Love Power Beauty (a music unit of female announcers from the same station) along with Mika Watanabe (currently also an announcer at the same station) and Tomoko Sumita (now retired). She was the main vocalist on the single CDs "Din Don Dan" and "Cool Bless Cool". In 2000, as a member of the CBC announcers, she participated in the chorus for "Burning Dragons! 2000 (Millennium)."

After graduating from university, she joined Chubu-Nippon Broadcasting (now CBC Television) as an announcer in 1996. Her fellow announcers were Tomohiro Sawa, Shinji Sakurazawa (currently in the news department and a weather forecaster), Sayuri Kato (currently head of CB's human resources development department), and Kazuyo Shigematsu (currently a freelance announcer). For a while after joining the company, she was mainly in charge of radio programs, but from 1998 to March 2013, she was a news anchor for television news programs. From April 2013 to March 2019, she was the host of " Midori Tanno's Yoridori!" on CBC Radio.

Shortly after starting her signature show, "Midori Tanno's Yoridori!", she developed spontaneous pneumothorax (catamenial pneumothorax) and was hospitalized for treatment (April 22, 2013 - May 13, 2013). Although she returned to the show, the condition recurred less than a year later and she was hospitalized again (February 26, 2014 - March 14, 2014). She announced on the show that she would undergo surgery to prevent a recurrence, and then took a leave of absence (April 21 - May 2, 2014).

She left CBC at the end of September 2013. On October 1, she became a freelance announcer affiliated with Central Japan.

On December 16, 2000, she married a doctor, but on June 6, 2017, episode of Midori Tanno's Yoridori!, she announced that she had divorced in May 2016. On August 4, 2017, episode, she announced that she had remarried the previous day (August 3), to a Korean real estate company president living in Japan.

In October 1998, while still a news announcer, she was appointed as a news anchor for "You Gotta! CBC" (a television news program) produced by the CBC Group. She appeared regularly on weekday evening live broadcasts for a total of 21 years (including a break when she became a freelance announcer and the following section), until the end of "Midori Tanno's Yoridori!" in March 2019. In April 2019, she restarted her career as a personality on "Midori Tanno's Yoridori Weekend" (a live wide-format program broadcast on Saturday evenings by CBC Radio). On the March 14, 2020 broadcast and on her blog and Instagram, she announced that the program would end with the March 28, 2020 broadcast.

In March 2019, she established Midori Tanno Announcement Office Company. At the time of establishment, the company was located at 7-2-4 Meieki, Nakamura-ku, Nagoya, Aichi Prefecture, the same address as the real estate company run by her husband. In January 2022, the head office address was changed to 7-4-1 Morita-cho, Nakamura-ku, Nagoya, Aichi Prefecture.

Her contract with Central Japan ended on May 31, 2019.

== Political career ==
Tanno entered politics because she felt the political system was stagnant and not performing well. On March 26, 2022, she held a press conference in Gifu City and announced that she would run for the 26th regular election for the House of Councillors, scheduled for July of that year, in the Gifu Prefecture electoral district as a candidate endorsed by the Democratic Party for the People. As a result of the vote on July 10 of the same year, she was defeated by a large margin by the incumbent Liberal Democratic Party candidate, Takeyuki Watanabe.

On October 20 of the same year, the Democratic Party for the People announced that it would field Tanno in the Aichi 11th district in the upcoming general election for the House of Representatives .

On October 15, 2024, the 50th general election for the House of Representatives was announced. Three candidates ran in the Aichi 11th district: Tanno, the incumbent Liberal Democratic Party candidate Tetsuya Yagi, and the Japanese Communist Party candidate Kazuo Ueda. Rengo Aichi and the All Toyota Labor Union recommended Tanno. On October 17, the Nihon Keizai Shimbun reported the early results, stating that "Yagi has 80% of the LDP support base and is slightly ahead. Tanno is in hot pursuit." On October 23, the Akahata newspaper broke a scoop that the LDP had paid 20 million yen each to the branches of candidates who had been de-endorsed due to a slush fund scandal. The newspaper's reporting dramatically changed the situation in the final stages. On October 24, the Nihon Keizai Shimbun published the results of a survey conducted from the 22nd to the 24th. The results for Aichi Prefecture's 11th district stated that "Tanno is one step ahead, while Yagi is in hot pursuit," and the order was reversed. The general election was held on October 27. Shortly after the voting deadline of 8 p.m., Tanno was elected for the first time. Yagi was 77 years old at the time of the election, which meant he was subject to the LDP's internal rules requiring a 73-year-old retirement age for proportional representation districts. He did not run in the proportional representation district, and therefore lost his seat.

== Language proficiency ==
She holds the Eiken Grade 2 and the Nihongo Kentei Grade 2 certificates.

== In media ==
=== TV Programs ===
- CBC Saturday News Wide (April 1998 - September 1998)
- CBC Newswide (October 1998 - March 1999)
- You Gotta! CBC (April 1999 - March 2006)
- Eiji Bando's Shine! New Talent Directory
- Good Day CBC (Narrator of " Kirby's Horoscope")
- Adult Classroom (Narrator)
- General Election 2009 Chaos ! Upper House Election 2010 (CBC local edition newscaster)
- Ippou (Main Caster) (April 2006 - March 2013)
- Tsurube's Sujinashi! (Narrator)
- That's what I want to know! Special Investigation! Bando Research (Narrator)
- Sunday Dragons (irregular appearances)

=== Radio programs ===
- Midori Tanno's Pick and Choose! (April 1, 2013 - March 29, 2019)
- Marathon Radio Shigeo Tada's Saturday
- K's UP (Thursday and Friday personality)
- It's 12:30am, Matsuzakaya, Cattleya Music (Tuesdays)
- Isuzu Letter to Mom and Dad (Navigator)
- Midori Tanno's Pick and Choose Weekend (April 6, 2019 - March 28, 2020)

=== CM ===
- Zenrosai (2016)

=== Promotional Video ===
- World Korean Trade Association (OKTA) Nagoya Branch Original Promotional Video 2018 (July 2018)
- Mitsui Tatemono PR video (narrator) (June 2018)
- Aichi Prefectural Police Crime Prevention News: Residential Intrusion Prevention Measures: Crime Prevention Measures to Prevent Intrusion (February 2015)

=== Event ===
- World Korean Trade Association (OKTA) Nagoya Branch 2017 Next Generation GBS Global Business School (lecture "How to be a good listener" lecture, talk session) (July 22, 2017)

== Election history ==
House of Representatives (Japan)
Preceded by Tetsuya Yagi	Member of the House of Representatives for Aichi 11th district (single-member); 2024–present	Incumbent
