= Shippō, Aichi =

Dissolved municipality in Aichi prefecture, Japan

Coordinates: 35°10′N 136°48′E

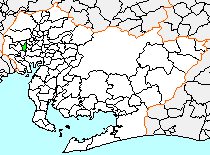
Location of Shippō in Aichi Prefecture

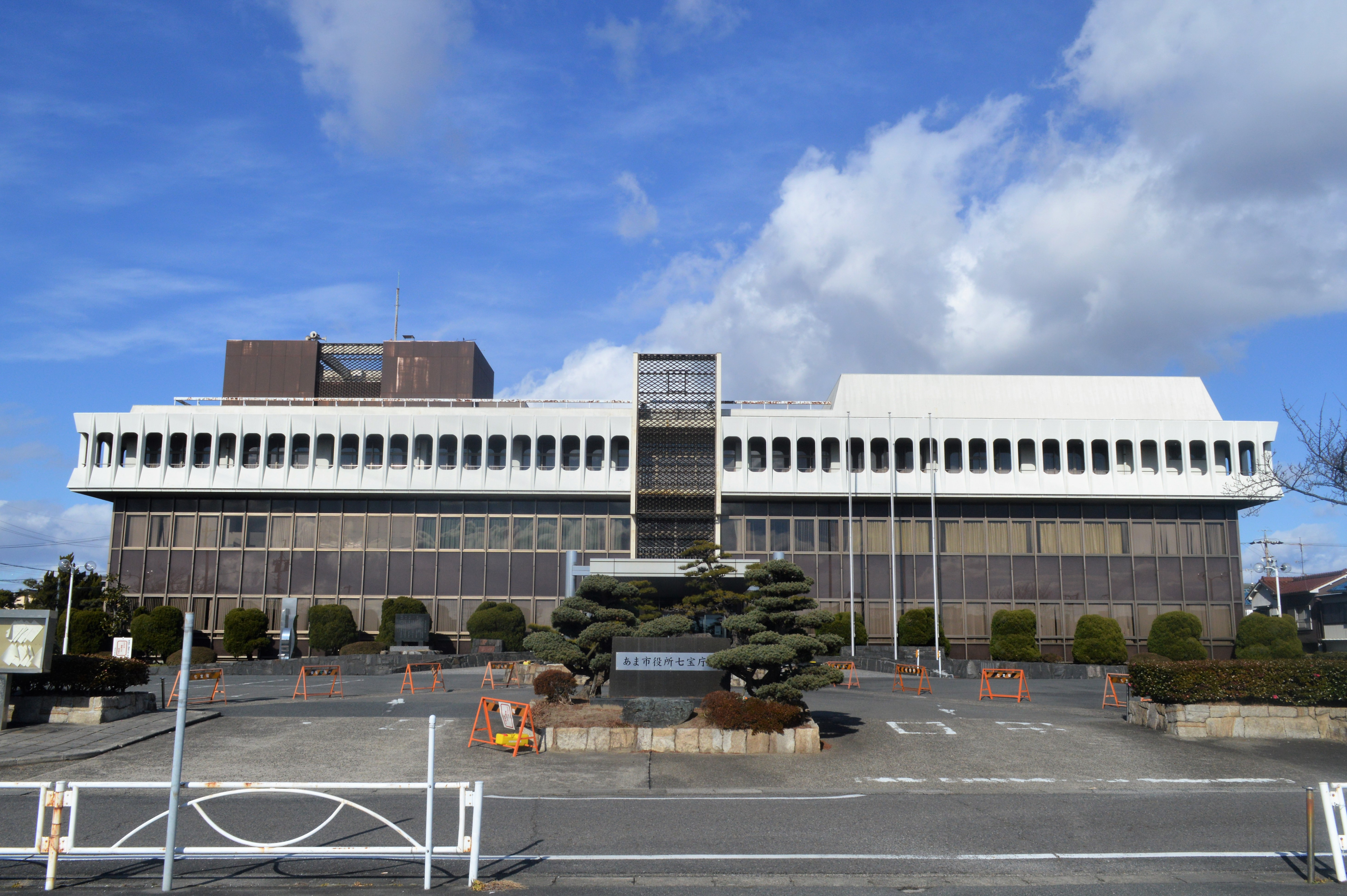
Shippō town hall

Shippō (七宝町, Shippō-chō) was a town located in Ama District, Aichi Prefecture, Japan.

== Population ==
As of 2003, the town had an estimated population of 22,795 and a density of 2,736.49 persons per km^{2}. The total area was 8.33 km^{2}.

== History ==
On March 22, 2010, Shippō, along with the towns of Jimokuji and Miwa (all from Ama District), was merged to form the new city of Ama.

== Etymology ==
The town name "Shippo" means cloisonné in Japanese. It is a traditional industry in the town.
