= Masaki Doi =

Japanese politician (born 1960)

- 土井 真樹

Member of the House of Representatives
- In office 11 September 2005 – 21 July 2009
- Constituency: Tōkai PR

Personal details
- Born: 17 July 1960 (age 66) Kariya, Aichi, Japan
- Party: Liberal Democratic
- Education: University of Tokyo

Masaki Doi (土井 真樹, Doi Masaki; born 7 July 1960) is a Japanese politician serving in the House of Representatives in the Diet (national legislature) as a member of the Liberal Democratic Party. A native of Kariya, Aichi and graduate of the University of Tokyo he was elected for the first time in 2005. He also passed the examination for Certified Public Accountant in 1983.
