= Miwa, Aichi =

Dissolved municipality in Ama district, Aichi prefecture, Japan

Coordinates: 35°12′N 136°47′E

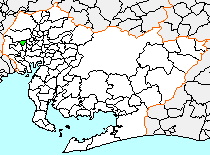
Location of Miwa in Aichi Prefecture

Miwa (美和町, Miwa-chō) was a town located in Ama District, Aichi Prefecture, Japan.

As of 2003, the town had an estimated population of 23,961 and a density of 2,415 persons per km^{2}. The total area was 9.92 km^{2}.

On March 22, 2010, Miwa, along with the towns of Shippō and Jimokuji (all from Ama District), was merged to form the new city of Ama.
