= Minami-Centrair =

Failed merger between Mihama and Minamichita in Aichi Prefecture, Japan

Minami-Centrair (南セントレア市, Minami-sentorea-shi) was the name of the city that would have been established through a merger between the towns of Minamichita and Mihama, both located in Chita District, Aichi Prefecture, Japan, which failed in 2005.

The proposed name was highly controversial among local residents, and was the main reason why the merger failed. Despite the name, the Chubu Centrair International Airport is not located in either of the towns, but is located in the city Tokoname north of the two cities.

== History ==
At the time when the merger between the two municipalities were proposed, "The Great Merger of Heisei" (平成の大合併, Heisei no dai-gappei), which was a series of mergers between municipalities endorsed by the government of Japan was taking place.

The merger was scheduled to take place on March 20, 2006, and the merger council gathered proposals for the name of the new city that would have been formed. The merger council decided to make the name of the new city "Minami-Centrair", referring to the Chubu Centrair International Airport that was planned to open in 2005. However, the airport was located in Tokoname, with the area of the new city located southeast of the airport. The new name received severe backlash from local residents, with over 500 phone calls and mails received by both towns criticizing the decision.

The merger council gave up making the name of the new city "Minami-Centrair", and the merger council dissolved following a failed referendum deciding if the merger should go on in February 25, 2005.
