= Asuke =

Asuke 足助町
- Former municipality
- Flag Emblem

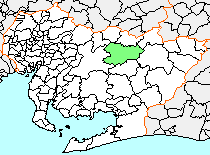
- Location of Asuke in Aichi Prefecture

- Location in Japan
- Coordinates: 35°8′2.3″N 137°8′43.5″E
- Country: Japan
- Region: Chūbu (Tōkai)
- Prefecture: Aichi Prefecture
- District: Higashikamo
- Merged: April 1, 2005 (now part of Toyota)

Area
  - Total: 193.00 km^{2} (74.52 sq mi)

Population (March 1, 2005)
  - Total: 9,699
  - Density: 50.25/km^{2} (130.1/sq mi)
- Time zone: UTC+09:00 (JST)
- Symbols
- Flower: Camellia sasanqua

Asuke (足助町, Asuke-chō) was a town located in Higashikamo District, central Aichi Prefecture, Japan.

As of March 1, 2005, the town had an estimated population of 9,699 and a population density of 50.25 persons per km^{2}. Its total area was 193.00 km^{2}.

The Kōrankei Gorge in Asuke, home to about 4,000 Japanese maple trees, is one of Aichi Prefecture's best-known viewing spots.

Asuke Village was created on October 1, 1889. It was elevated to town status on December 17, 1890. The town area was expanded on April 1, 1955, by the annexation of the neighboring villages of Morioka, Kamo, and Azuri.

On April 1, 2005, Asuke, along with the town of Fujioka, and village of Obara (both from Nishikamo District), the towns of Asahi and Inabu, and the village of Shimoyama (all from Higashikamo District), was merged into the expanded city of Toyota, and has ceased to exist as an independent municipality.

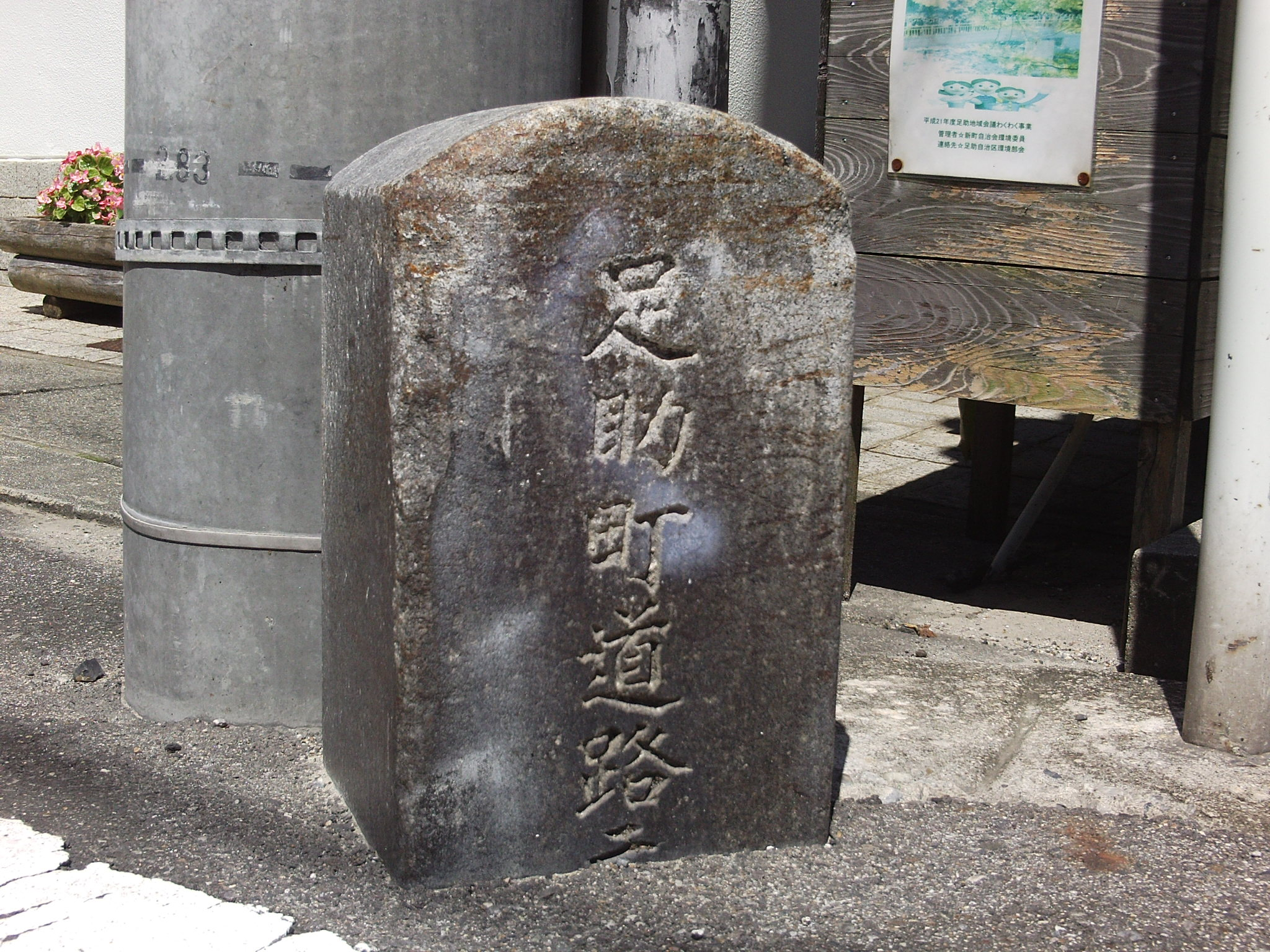
The Kilometre Zero of Asuke

== See also ==
- Media related to Asuke-chō, Toyota at Wikimedia Commons
- Asuke travel guide from Wikivoyage
- Groups of Traditional Buildings
