= Fujioka, Aichi =

Fujioka 藤岡町
- Former municipality
- Flag Emblem

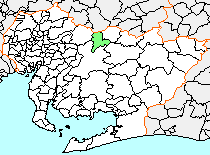
- Location of Fujioka in Aichi Prefecture

- Location in Japan
- Coordinates: 35°11′52″N 137°12′24″E
- Country: Japan
- Region: Chūbu (Tōkai)
- Prefecture: Aichi Prefecture
- District: Nishikamo
- Merged: April 1, 2005 (now part of Toyota)

Area
  - Total: 65.58 km^{2} (25.32 sq mi)

Population (December 1, 2004)
  - Total: 19,239
  - Density: 48.9/km^{2} (127/sq mi)
- Time zone: UTC+09:00 (JST)
- Symbols
- Flower: Wisteria
- Tree: Prunus serrulata

Fujioka (藤岡町, Fujioka-chō) was a town located in Nishikamo District, north-central Aichi Prefecture, Japan.

As of December 1, 2004, the town had an estimated population of 19,239 and a population density of 293.4 persons per km^{2}. Its total area was 65.58 km^{2}.

During the early Meiji period cadastral reforms, the villages of Tomioka and Fujikawa were established on October 1, 1889. The two villages merged to form the village of Fujioka on April 1, 1906. The village was raised to town status on April 1, 1978.

On April 1, 2005, Fujioka, along with the village of Obara (also from Nishikamo District), the towns of Asuke, Asahi and Inabu, and the village of Shimoyama (all from Higashikamo District), was merged into the expanded city of Toyota, and has ceased to exist as an independent municipality.

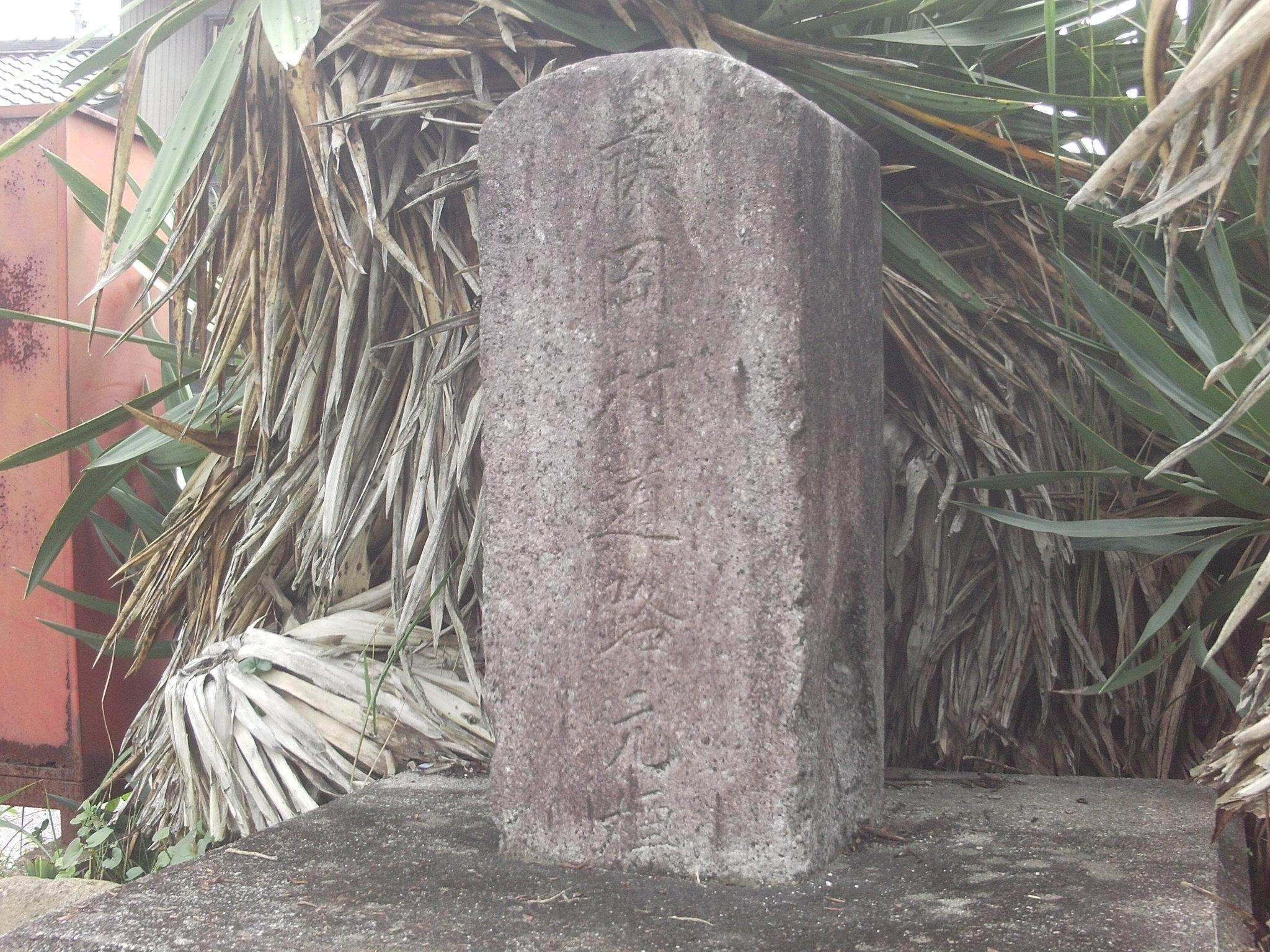
The Kilometre Zero of Fujioka
