= Obara, Aichi =

Obara 小原村
- Former Village
- Flag Emblem

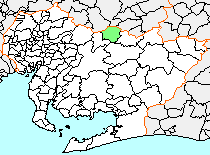
- Location of Obara in Aichi Prefecture

- Location in Japan
- Coordinates: 35°13′46.5″N 137°17′6.3″E
- Country: Japan
- Region: Chūbu (Tōkai)
- Prefecture: Aichi Prefecture
- District: Nishikamo
- Merged: April 1, 2005 (now part of Toyota)

Area
  - Total: 74.54 km^{2} (28.78 sq mi)

Population (December 1, 2004)
  - Total: 4,353
  - Density: 58.4/km^{2} (151/sq mi)
- Time zone: UTC+09:00 (JST)
- Symbols
- Bird: Japanese bush-warbler
- Flower: Lilium japonicum
- Tree: Prunus serrulata

Obara (小原村, Obara-mura) was a village located in Nishikamo District, north-central Aichi Prefecture, Japan.

== Population ==
As of December 1, 2004, the village had an estimated population of 4,353 and a population density of 58.4 persons per km^{2}. Its total area was 74.54 km^{2}.

== Industry ==
Obara was well known as the home of traditional Japanese "Washi" mulberry paper.

== History ==
Obara Village was created on July 1, 1906, through the merger of the hamlets of Kiyohara, Honjo, Fukuhara and Toyohara. On July 13, 1972, the village was partly destroyed by landslides following heavy rains, with the loss of 32 lives.

== Merge ==
On April 1, 2005, Obara, along with the town of Fujioka (also from Nishikamo District), the towns of Asuke, Asahi and Inabu, and the village of Shimoyama (all from Higashikamo District), was merged into the expanded city of Toyota, and has ceased to exist as an independent municipality.

== Attractions ==
Obara is the only place in Japan where 10,000 rare shikizakura (四季桜, "four-seasons-cherry blossom") cherry trees grow, which bloom twice a year in spring and autumn. These trees are said to have originated in the early 1800s when the samurai physician Fujimoto Genseki was presented with one of those trees from a temple in Nagoya.

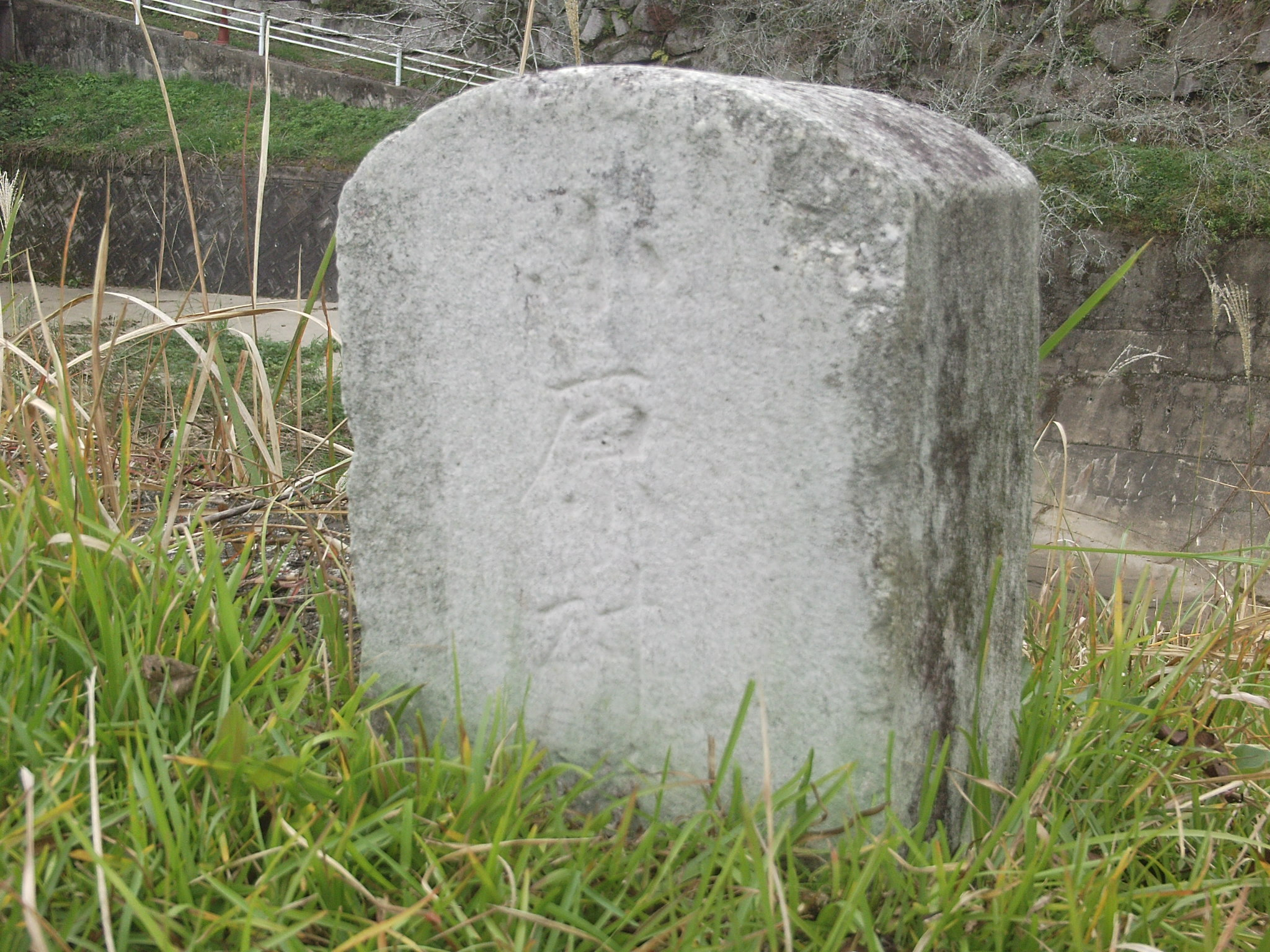
The Kilometre Zero of Obara
