= Katsumasa Suzuki =

Japanese politician

Katsuma Suzuki
- 鈴木 克昌
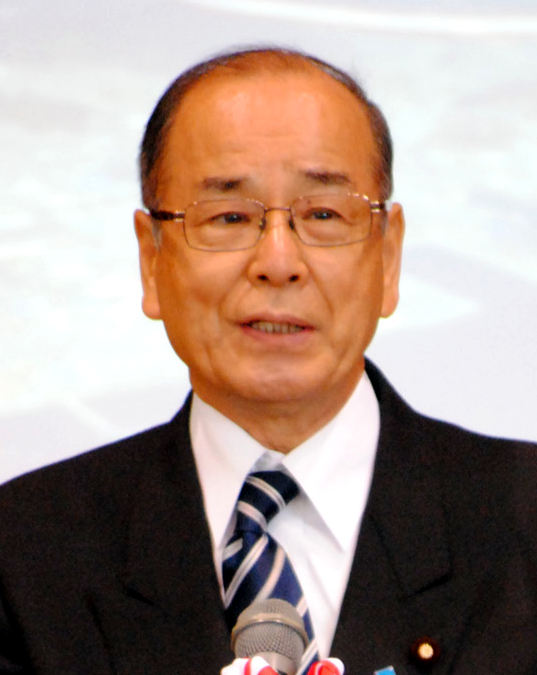
- Suzuki in 2014

Member of the House of Representatives
- In office 9 November 2003 – 28 September 2017
- Preceded by: Katsuhito Asano
- Succeeded by: Multi-member district
- Constituency: Aichi 14th (2003–2012); Tōkai PR (2012–2017)

Mayor of Gamagōri
- In office 22 February 1994 – 14 October 1999
- Preceded by: Susumu Ōba
- Succeeded by: Hisao Kinbara

Member of the Aichi Prefectural Assembly
- In office December 1982 – 20 December 1993
- Constituency: Gamagōri City

Personal details
- Born: 14 November 1943 (age 82) Gamagōri, Aichi, Japan
- Party: Democratic (2003–2012; 2014–2016)
- Other political affiliations: LDP (1982–1993); Independent (1993–2003); PLF (2012); LP (2012–2014; 2017–2019); DP (2016–2017)
- Education: Nihon University

Katsumasa Suzuki (鈴木 克昌, Suzuki Katsumasa; born 14 November 1943) is a former Japanese politician who served as a member of House of Representatives for the Tomorrow Party of Japan. He was previously a member of the Democratic Party of Japan.

Born in Gamagōri, Aichi he graduated from Nihon University with a degree in economics. He was elected for the first time in 2003 after an unsuccessful run in 2000.
