= Tōei, Aichi =

Tōei 東栄町
- Town
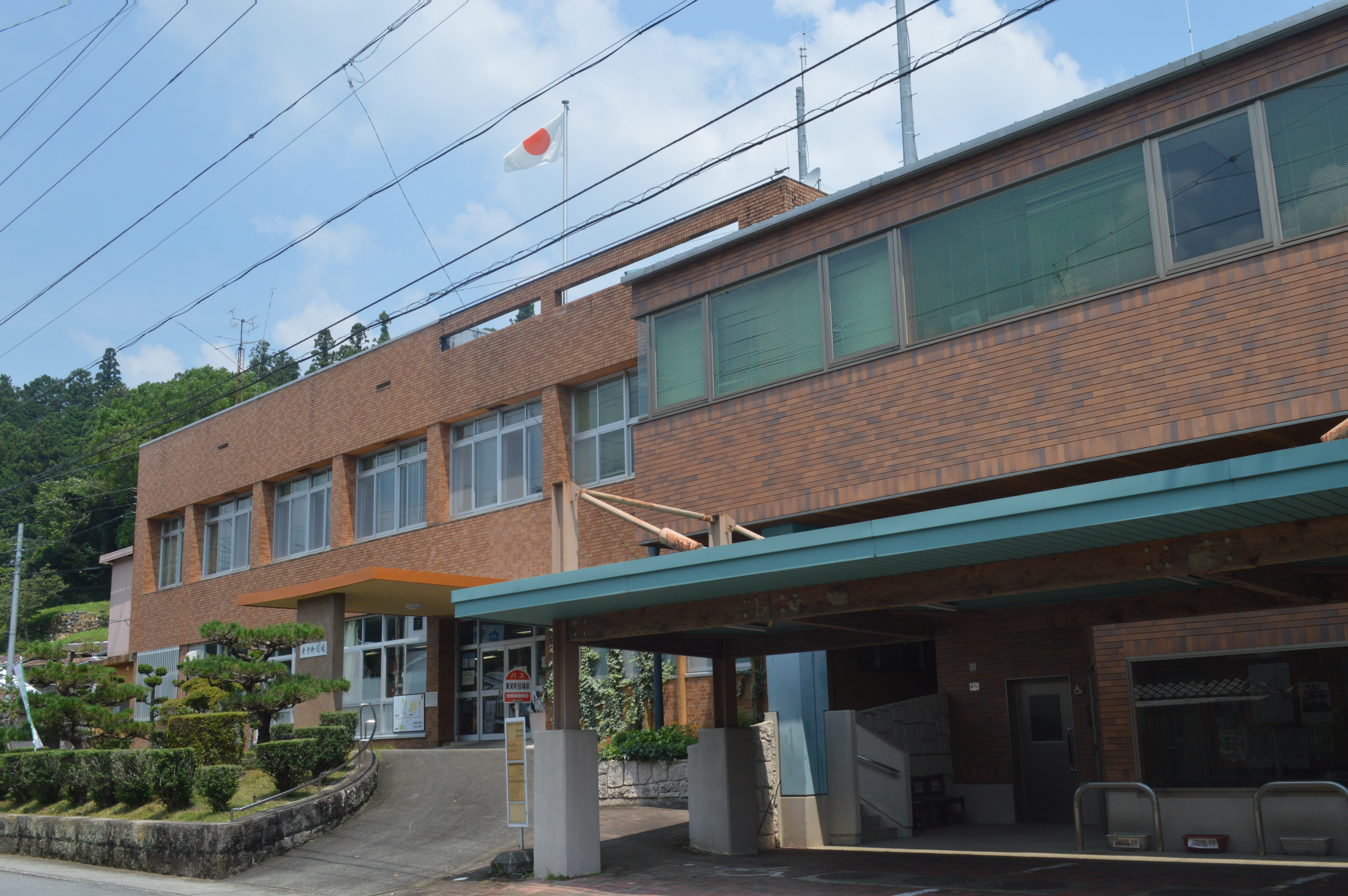
- Tōei town hall

- Flag Coat of arms

- Location of Tōei in Aichi Prefecture

- Coordinates: 35°4′36.3″N 137°41′52.1″E
- Country: Japan
- Region: Chūbu region Tōkai region
- Prefecture: Aichi
- District: Kitashitara

Area
  - Total: 123.38 km^{2} (47.64 sq mi)

Population (October 1, 2019)
  - Total: 3,033
  - Density: 24.58/km^{2} (63.67/sq mi)
- Time zone: UTC+9 (Japan Standard Time)
- Symbols
  - Tree: Cryptomeria
  - Flower: Lilium auratum
  - Bird: Japanese bush-warbler
- Phone number: 0536-76-0501
- Address: Hongo, Tōei-mura, Kitashitara-gun, Aichi-ken 449-0292
- Website: Official website

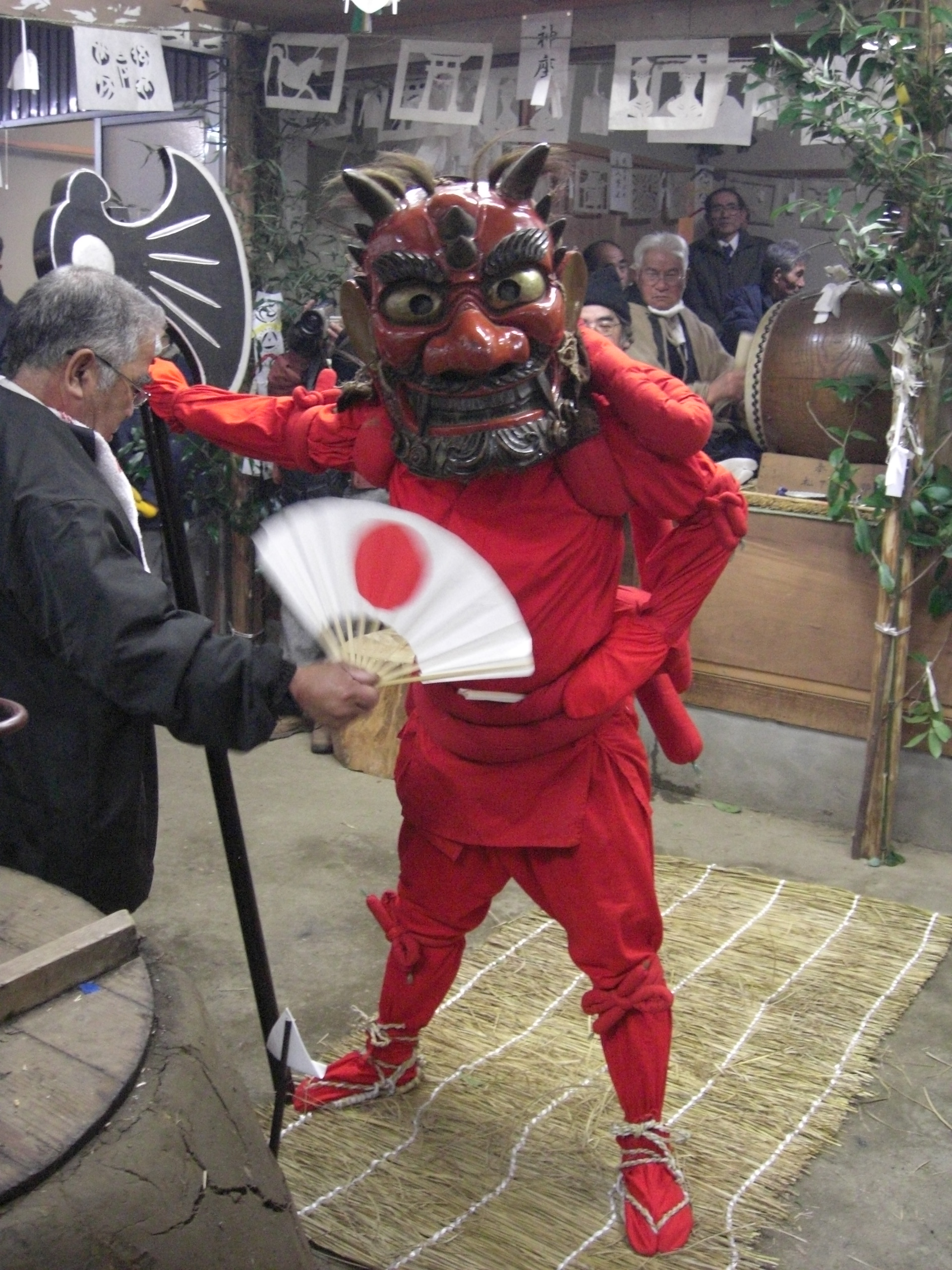
Hana Matsuri

Tōei (東栄町, Tōei-chō) is a town located in Kitashitara District, Aichi Prefecture, Japan. As of 1 October 2019, the town had an estimated population of 3,033 in 1438 households, and a population density of 24.6 persons per km^{2}. The total area of the town was 123.38 square kilometres (47.64 sq mi).

== Geography ==
Tōei is located in the extreme northeast corner of Aichi Prefecture. Over 90 percent of the town's area is covered by 700 to 1000 meter mountains and forest, and much of the town is within the borders of the Tenryū-Okumikawa Quasi-National Park.

=== Neighboring municipalities ===
Aichi Prefecture

- Shinshiro
- Kitashitara District
  - Shitara
  - Toyone

Shizuoka Prefecture

- Tenryū-ku, Hamamatsu

== Demographics ==
Per Japanese census data, the population of Tōei has decreased drastically, and is now a third of what it was in 1960.

Historical population
Year	Pop.	±%
1960	10,843	—
1970	7,706	−28.9%
1980	6,236	−19.1%
1990	5,441	−12.7%
2000	4,717	−13.3%
2010	3,758	−20.3%

=== Climate ===
The town has a climate characterized by characterized by hot and humid summers, and relatively mild winters (Köppen climate classification Cfa). The average annual temperature in Tōeiis 14.5 °C. The average annual rainfall is 2101 mm with September as the wettest month. The temperatures are highest on average in August, at around 26.1 °C, and lowest in January, at around 3.4 °C.

== History ==
During the Edo period all of present Tōei was tenryō territory under direct control of the Tokugawa shogunate. After the Meiji Restoration, the area was organized into several villages within Kitashitara District, Aichi including Hongō, Miwa, Midono, Furikusa and Sono with the establishment of the modern municipalities system. In 1900, a portion of Hongō Village split off to become Shimokawa Village. Hongō was elevated to town status on October 1, 1921.

On April 1, 1955, Hongō Town merged with the neighboring villages of Midono, Shimokawa and Sono to form the town of Tōei. The village of Miwa joined the new town the following year, on July 1, 1956.

== Economy ==
The primary industry of Tōei is small-scale forestry, and agriculture. The town derives some revenue from hydroelectric power generation.

== Education ==
Tōei has one public elementary school and one public junior high school operated by the town government. The town does not have a high school.

== Transportation ==
=== Railway ===
Central Japan Railway Company - Iida Line

- Tōei

=== Highway ===
- National Route 151
- National Route 473

== Local attractions ==
- Hana Matsuri is an annual festival held from November through March, in which over 40 performers with wooden masks perform dances and rituals. It has been recognized as an Intangible Important Cultural Property since May 4, 1976.
