= Asahi, Aichi =

Asahi 旭町
- Former municipality
- Flag Emblem

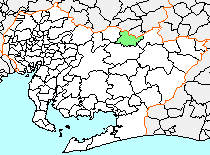
- Location of Asahi in Aichi Prefecture

- Location in Japan
- Coordinates: 35°13′53″N 137°21′44.4″E
- Country: Japan
- Region: Chūbu (Tōkai)
- Prefecture: Aichi Prefecture
- District: Higashikamo
- Merged: April 1, 2005 (now part of Toyota)

Area
  - Total: 32.11 km^{2} (12.40 sq mi)

Population (March 1, 2005)
  - Total: 3,553
  - Density: 110.65/km^{2} (286.6/sq mi)
- Time zone: UTC+09:00 (JST)
- Symbols
- Flower: Azalea
- Tree: Pine

Asahi (旭町, Asahi-chō) was a town located in Higashikamo District, north-central Aichi Prefecture, Japan.

As of September 1, 2004, the town had an estimated population of 3,553 and a population density of 110.65 persons per km^{2}. Its total area was 32.11 km^{2}.

Asahi Village was created in 1906 through the merger of four small hamlets. It was elevated to town status on 1967.

On April 1, 2005, Asahi, along with the town of Fujioka, the village of Obara (both from Nishikamo District), the towns of Asuke and Inabu, and the village of Shimoyama (all from Higashikamo District), was merged into the expanded city of Toyota, and has ceased to exist as an independent municipality.

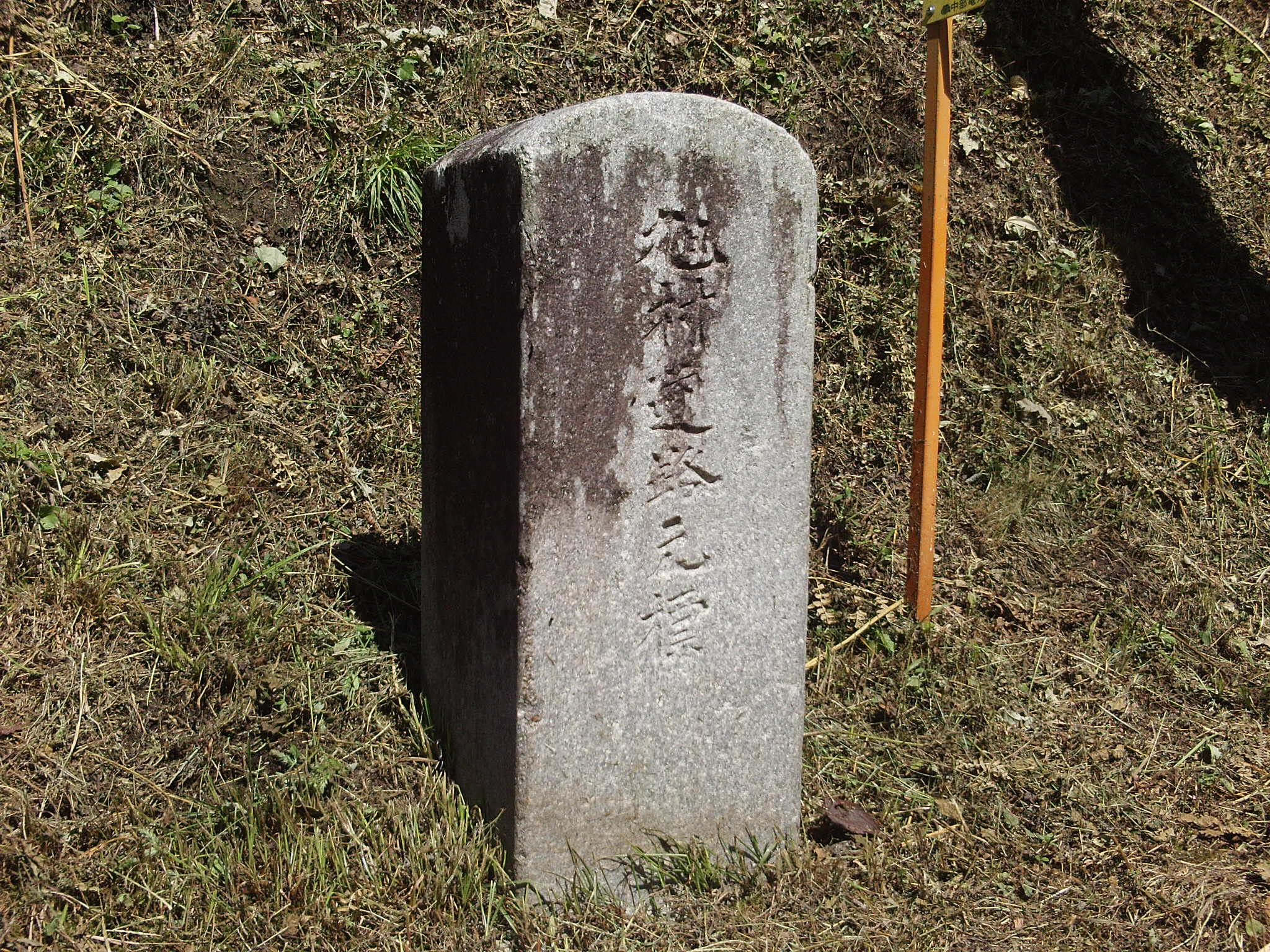
The Kilometre Zero of Asahi
