= Shimoyama, Aichi =

Shimoyama 下山村
- Former municipality
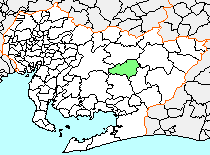
- Location of Shimoyama in Aichi Prefecture
- Coordinates: 35°2′27″N 137°19′8″E
- Country: Japan
- Region: Chūbu (Tōkai)
- Prefecture: Aichi Prefecture
- District: Higashikamo
- Merged: April 1, 2005 (now part of Toyota)

Area
  - Total: 114.18 km^{2} (44.09 sq mi)

Population (September 1, 2004)
  - Total: 5,593
  - Density: 48.9/km^{2} (127/sq mi)
- Time zone: UTC+09:00 (JST)
- Symbols
- Flower: Lilium japonicum
- Tree: Chamaecyparis obtusa

Shimoyama (下山村, Shimoyama-mura) was a village located in Higashikamo District, east-central Aichi Prefecture, Japan.

== Population ==
As of April 1, 2004, the village had an estimated population of 5,593 and a population density of 48.9 persons per km^{2}. Its total area was 114.18 km^{2}.

== History ==
The modern village of Shimoyama was created on October 1, 1889.

On April 1, 2005, Shimoyama, along with the town of Fujioka, the village of Obara (both from Nishikamo District), and the towns of Asuke, Asahi, and Inabu (all from Higashikamo District), was merged into the expanded city of Toyota, and has ceased to exist as an independent municipality.

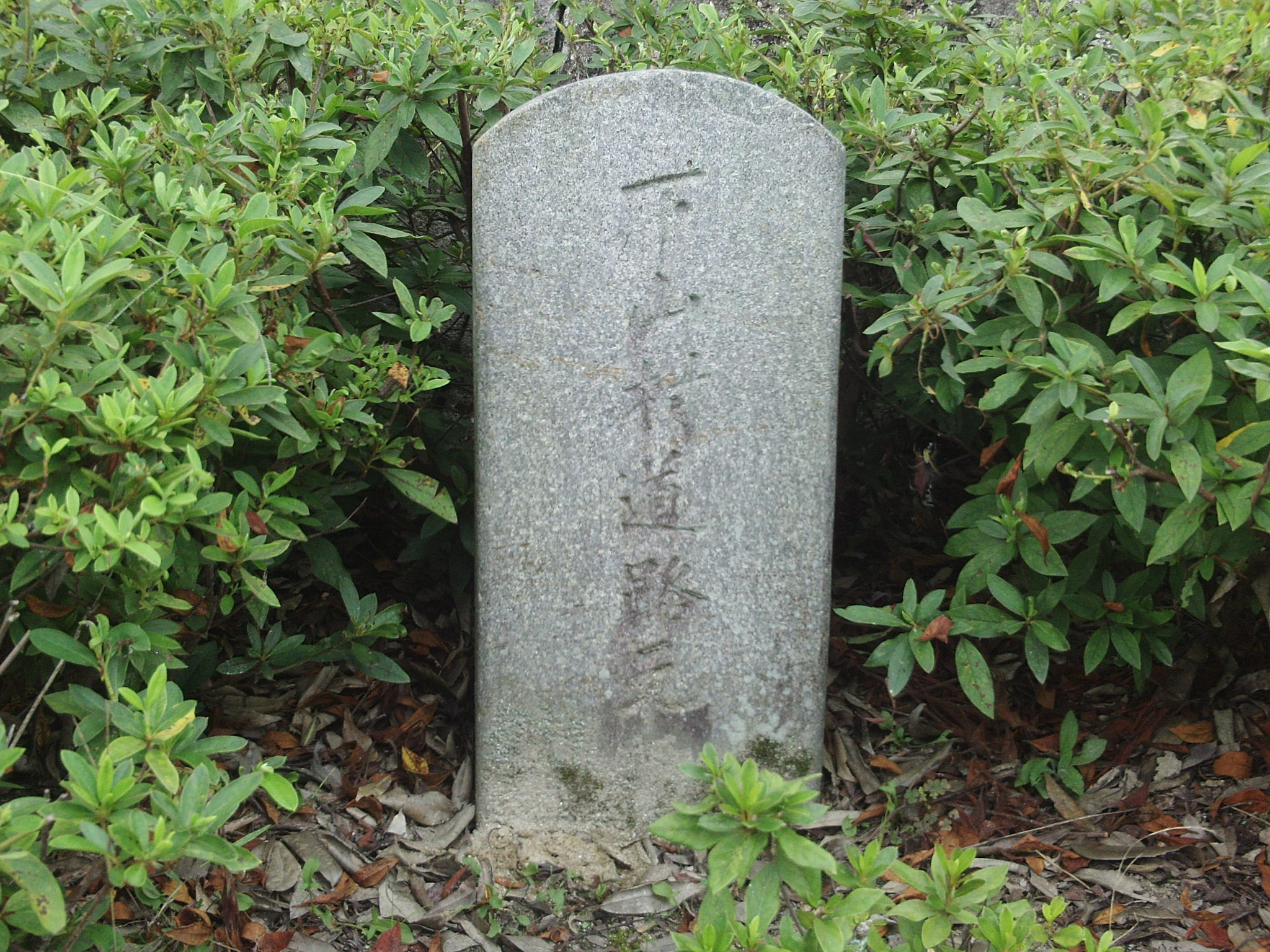
The Kilometre Zero of Shimoyama
