= Nobutaka Hirano =

Japanese volleyball player (born 1972)

Nobutaka Hirano (born December 5, 1972) is a former volleyball player from Ama, Aichi, Japan, who played for the Men's National Team in the 1990s. Nicknamed Heita he ended up in sixteenth place at the 1998 World Championship.

== Honours ==
- 1998 World Championship — 16th place
