= Jimokuji =

Dissolved municipality in Aichi prefecture, Japan

Coordinates: 35°12′N 136°49′E

Location of Jimokuji in Aichi Prefecture

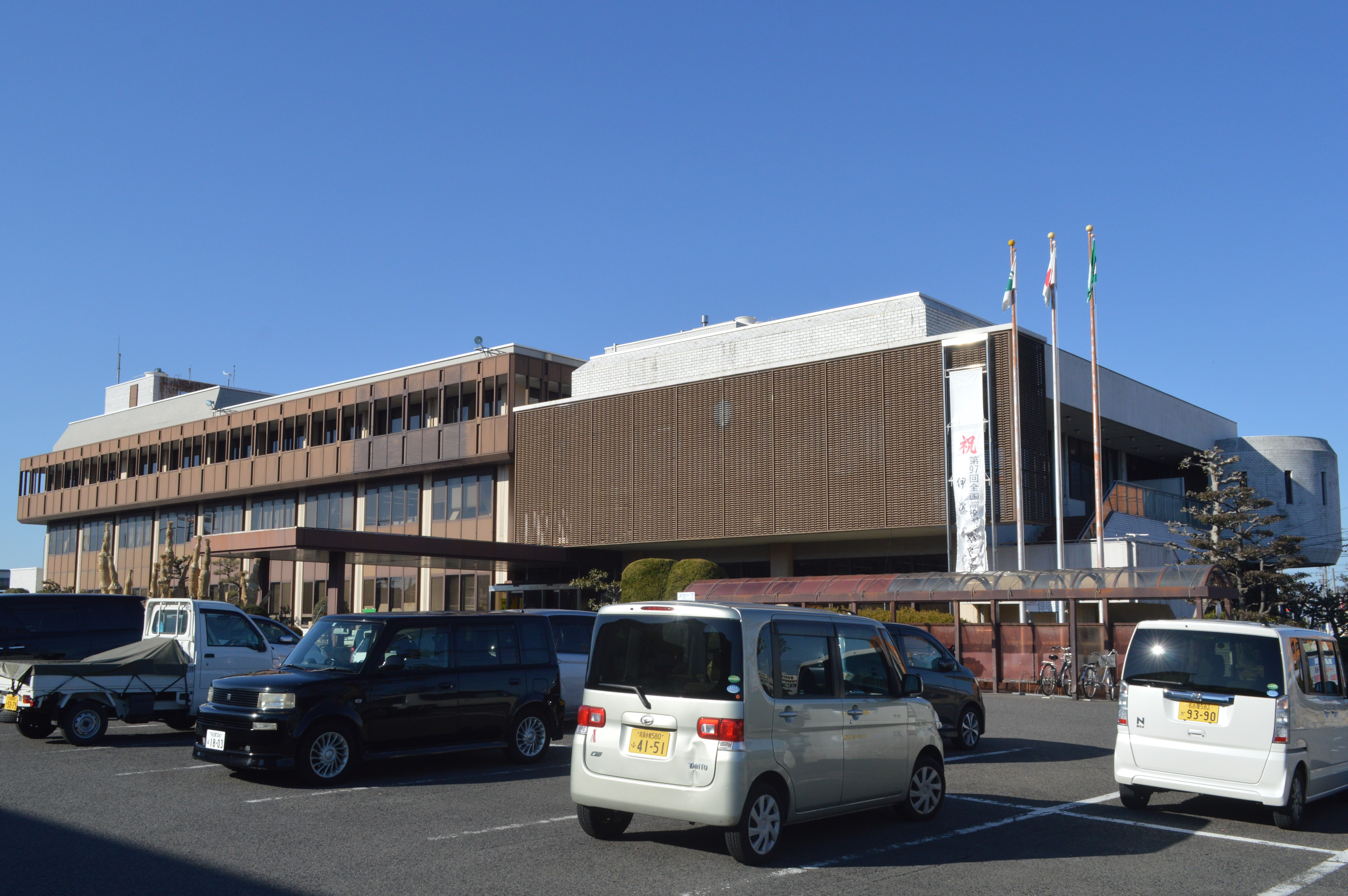
former Jimokuji town hall

Flag of Jimokuji, Aichi

Jimokuji (甚目寺町, Jimokuji-chō) was a town located in Ama District, Aichi Prefecture, Japan.

As of 2003, the town had an estimated population of 37,651 and a density of 4,035.48 persons per km^{2}. The total area was 9.33 km^{2}.

On March 22, 2010, Jimokuji, along with the towns of Miwa and Shippō (all from Ama District), was merged to form the new city of Ama.
