= List of mergers and dissolutions of municipalities in Japan =

This page links to the list of mergers and dissolutions of municipalities in Japan for each prefecture.

For a list of dissolved municipalities, see also: Category:Dissolved municipalities of Japan and the sister category Category:Former districts of Japan.

== Lists, by prefecture ==
Note that most of the prefectural websites linked below are in Japanese.

Aichi Prefecture	List of mergers
Akita Prefecture	List of mergers
Aomori Prefecture	List of mergers
Chiba Prefecture	List of mergers
Ehime Prefecture	List of mergers
Fukui Prefecture	List of mergers
Fukuoka Prefecture	List of mergers	Website
Fukushima Prefecture	List of mergers	Website
Gifu Prefecture	List of mergers	Website
Gunma Prefecture	List of mergers	Website
Hiroshima Prefecture	List of mergers
Hokkaido	List of mergers	Website
Hyōgo Prefecture	List of mergers	Website
Ibaraki Prefecture	List of mergers	Website
Ishikawa Prefecture	List of mergers	Website
Iwate Prefecture	List of mergers	Website
Kagawa Prefecture	List of mergers	Website
Kagoshima Prefecture	List of mergers	Website
Kanagawa Prefecture	List of mergers	Website
Kōchi Prefecture	List of mergers	Website
Kumamoto Prefecture	List of mergers	Website
Kyoto Prefecture	List of mergers	Website
Mie Prefecture	List of mergers	Website
Miyagi Prefecture	List of mergers
Miyazaki Prefecture	List of mergers	Website
Nagano Prefecture	List of mergers	Website
Nagasaki Prefecture	List of mergers	Website
Nara Prefecture	List of mergers	Website
Niigata Prefecture	List of mergers	Website
Ōita Prefecture	List of mergers	Website
Okayama Prefecture	List of mergers	Website
Okinawa Prefecture	List of mergers	Website
Osaka Prefecture	List of mergers	Website
Saga Prefecture	List of mergers
Saitama Prefecture	List of mergers
Shiga Prefecture	List of mergers
Shimane Prefecture	List of mergers	Website
Shizuoka Prefecture	List of mergers	Website
Tochigi Prefecture	List of mergers	Website
Tokushima Prefecture	List of mergers	Website
Tokyo Metropolis	List of mergers
Tottori Prefecture	List of mergers	Website
Toyama Prefecture	List of mergers	Website
Wakayama Prefecture	List of mergers
Yamagata Prefecture	List of mergers
Yamaguchi Prefecture	List of mergers
Yamanashi Prefecture	List of mergers

== See also ==
- A list of future mergers for every prefecture can be found here (in Japanese).
- A list of former mergers for every prefecture can be found here or here (in Japanese).
