= Nukata, Aichi =

Former town in Aichi Prefecture, Japan

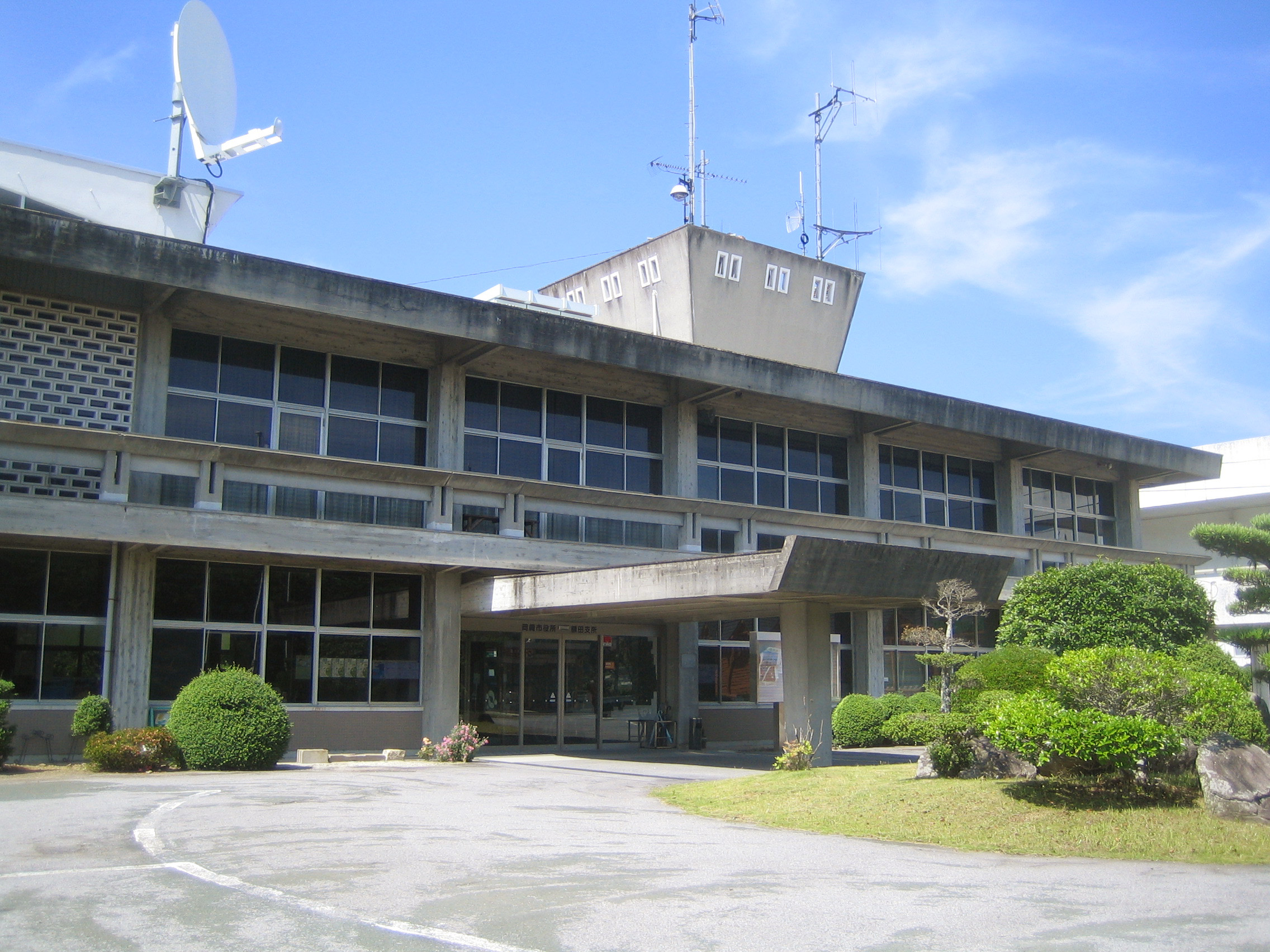
Former Nukata Town Hall

Nukata (額田町, Nukata-chō) was a town located in Nukata District, Aichi Prefecture, Japan.

== Population ==
In 2003, Nukata had an estimated population of 9,307 and a population density of 58.07 persons per km^{2}. The total area of Nukata was 160.27 km^{2}.

== Merge ==
On January 1, 2006, Nukata was merged into the expanded city of Okazaki.
