= Higashikamo District =

Former district in Aichi prefecture, Japan

Coordinates: 35°5′N 137°4′E

Higashikamo (東加茂郡, Higashikamo-gun) was a district located in Nishimikawa Region in central Aichi Prefecture, Japan.

The entire district is now part of the city of Toyota.

As of 2004 (the last data available), the district had an estimated population of 16,703 with a density of 43.84 persons per km^{2}. Its total area was 381.06 km^{2}.

== Municipalities ==
Prior to its dissolution, the district consisted of three towns and one village:

- Asuke (Note: Classified as a town.)
- Asahi
- Inabu
- Shimoyama (Note: Classified as a village.)

== History ==
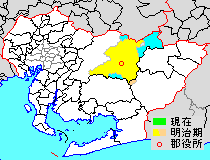
Location of former Higashikamo-gun, Aichi Prefecture, highlighted in yellow.

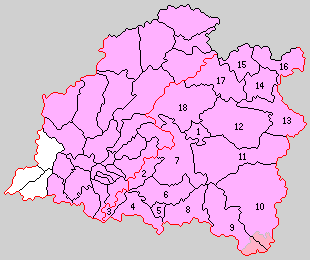
Colored areas are in this district.

Kamo District (加茂郡) was one of the ancient districts of Shinano Province, but was transferred to Mikawa Province during the Sengoku period. In the cadastral reforms of the early Meiji period, on July 22, 1878, Kamo District was divided into Higashikamo District and Nishikamo District within Aichi Prefecture. With the organization of municipalities on October 1, 1889, Higashikamo District was divided into 18 villages.

=== District Timeline ===
- The village of Asuke was elevated to town status on December 17, 1890, and two new villages were created in 1889 and 1890. In a round of consolidation, the remaining number of villages was reduced from 19 to six in 1906.
- On April 1, 1955, three of the remaining villages (Morioka, Kamo, and Aro) were annexed by the town of Asuke; however, a new village (Asahi) was created through a border adjustment with parts of the village of Sanno (formerly from Ena District, Gifu Prefecture).
- On November 1, 1961, the village of Matsudaira gained town status, followed by the village of Asahi.
- On April 1, 1967, the town of Matsudaira was annexed by the city of Koromo.

=== Recent mergers ===
- On October 1, 2003 - The town of Inabu was transferred from Kitashitara District to Higashikamo District, leaving the district with two towns and one village.
- On April 1, 2005 - The towns of Asuke, Asahi and Inabu, and the village of Shimoyama, along with the town of Fujioka, and the village of Obara (both from Nishikamo District), were all merged into the expanded city of Toyota. Therefore, Higashikamo District was dissolved as a result of this merger.

== See also ==
- List of dissolved districts of Japan
- Nishikamo District, Aichi
- Kamo District, Gifu
- Kamo District, Hiroshima
- Kamo District, Shizuoka
