= Inabu =

Inabu 稲武町
- Former municipality
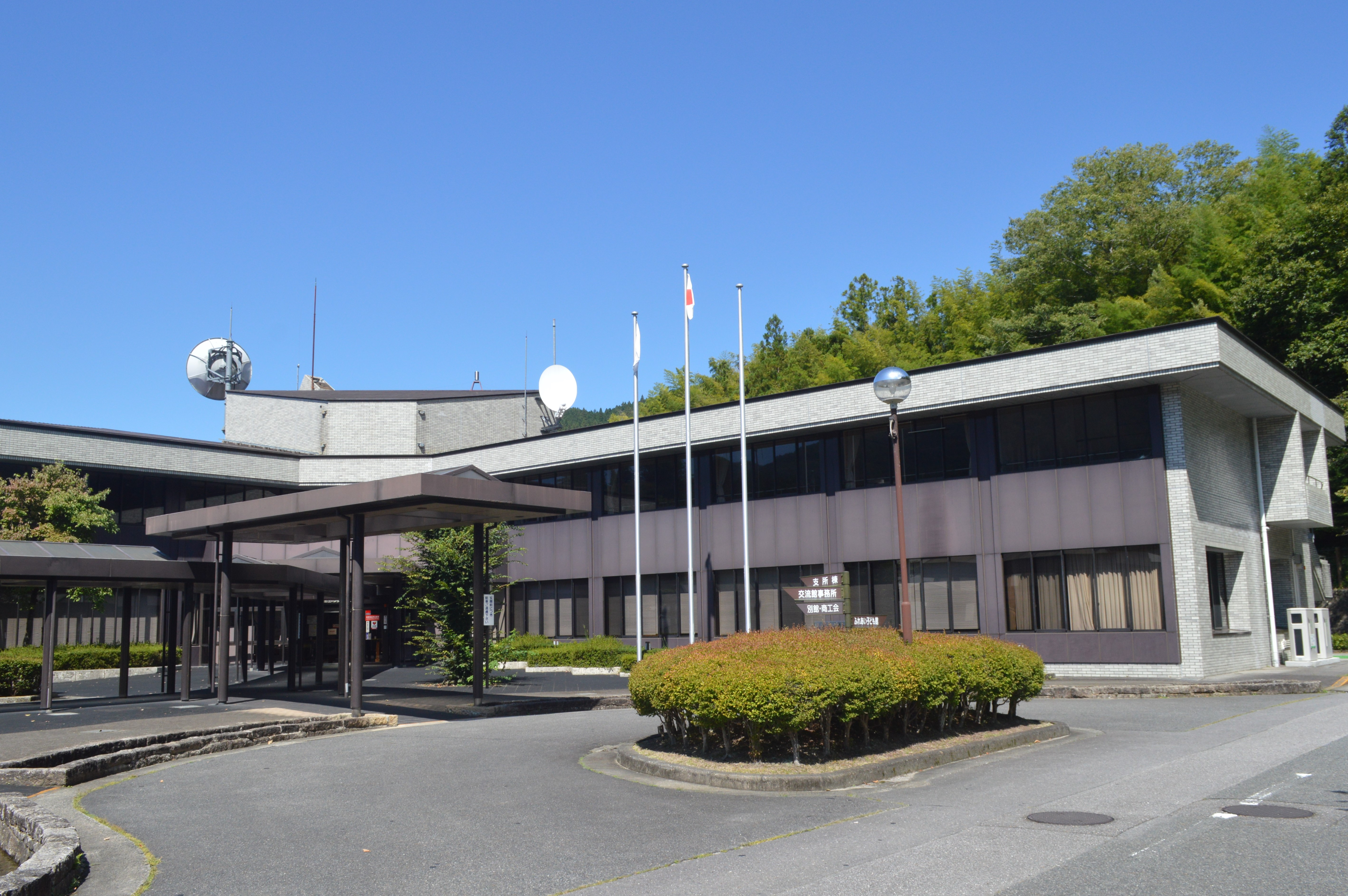
- former Inabu town hall

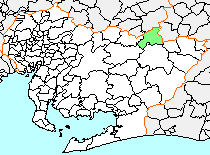
- Location of Inabu in Aichi Prefecture

- Location in Japan
- Coordinates: 35°12′57.56″N 137°30′32.06″E
- Country: Japan
- Region: Chūbu (Tōkai)
- Prefecture: Aichi Prefecture
- District: Higashikamo
- Merged: April 1, 2005 (now part of Toyota)

Area
  - Total: 98.36 km^{2} (37.98 sq mi)

Population (2005)
  - Total: 2,928
  - Density: 30/km^{2} (78/sq mi)
- Time zone: UTC+09:00 (JST)
- Symbols
- Flower: Azalea
- Tree: Cryptomeria

Inabu (稲武町, Inabu-chō) was a town located in Higashikamo District, in the mountainous section of north-central Aichi Prefecture, Japan, bordering Gifu Prefecture and Nagano Prefecture.

As of the 2005 census the town had a population of 2,928. Its total area was 98.36 km^{2}.

During the early Meiji period cadastral reforms, the villages of Inahashi and Busetsu were established on October 1, 1889. The two villages merged to form the town of Inabu in 1940. Until September 30, 2003, the town was located within Kitashitara District, but from October 1, 2003 to March 31, 2005, the town was located within Higashikamo District.

On April 1, 2005, Inabu, along with the town of Fujioka, the village of Obara (both from Nishikamo District), the towns of Asuke and Asahi, and the village of Shimoyama (all from Higashikamo District), was merged into the expanded city of Toyota, and has ceased to exist as an independent municipality.
