= Motoshi Sugita =

Japanese politician

- 杉田 元司

Member of the House of Representatives
- In office 11 September 2005 – 21 July 2009
- Constituency: Tōkai PR

Member of the Aichi Prefectural Assembly
- In office 30 April 1999 – 30 August 2005
- Constituency: Toyohashi City

Personal details
- Born: 28 July 1951 (age 75) Tahara, Aichi, Japan
- Party: Liberal Democratic
- Education: Chuo University

Motoshi Sugita (杉田 元司, Sugita Motoshi; born 28 July 1951) is a Japanese politician of the Liberal Democratic Party, a member of the House of Representatives in the Diet (national legislature). A native of Tahara, Aichi and graduate of Chuo University, he was elected to the House of Representatives for the first time in 2005 after serving in the Aichi Prefectural Assembly for two terms.
