= Shitara, Aichi =

Shitara 設楽町
- Town
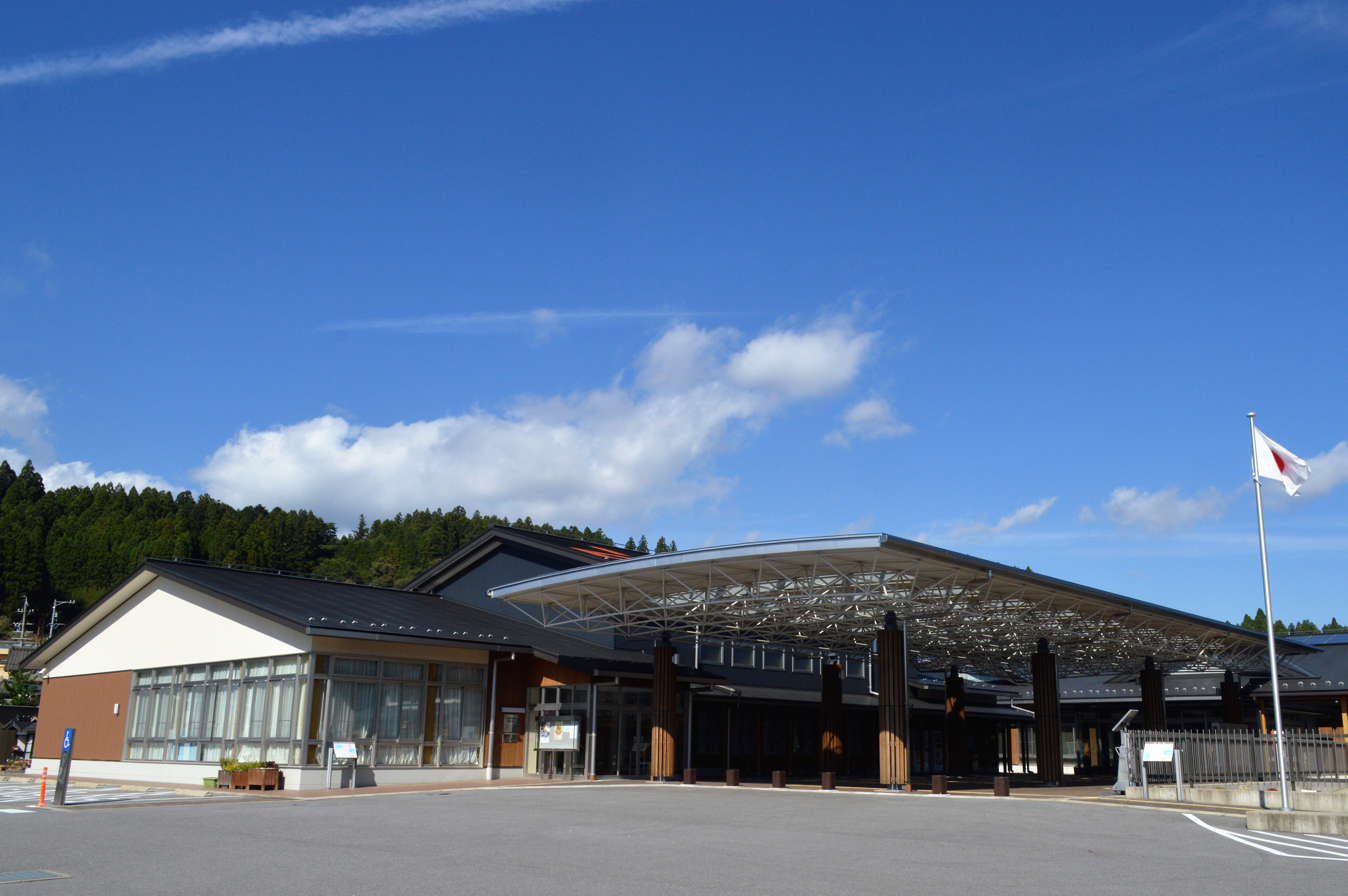
- Shitara Town Hall and Library

- Flag Emblem

- Location of Shitara in Aichi Prefecture

- Coordinates: 35°6′N 137°34′E
- Country: Japan
- Region: Chūbu region Tōkai region
- Prefecture: Aichi
- District: Kitashitara

Government
  - -Mayor: Kazutoshi Kato

Area
  - Total: 273.94 km^{2} (105.77 sq mi)

Population (October 1, 2019)
  - Total: 4,531
  - Density: 16.54/km^{2} (42.84/sq mi)
- Time zone: UTC+9 (Japan Standard Time)
- Tree: Japanese beech
- Flower: Rhododendron
- Phone number: 0536-62-0511
- Address: 2 Idate, Taguti, Shitara-chō, Kitashitara-gun, Aichi-ken 441-2301
- Website: Official website

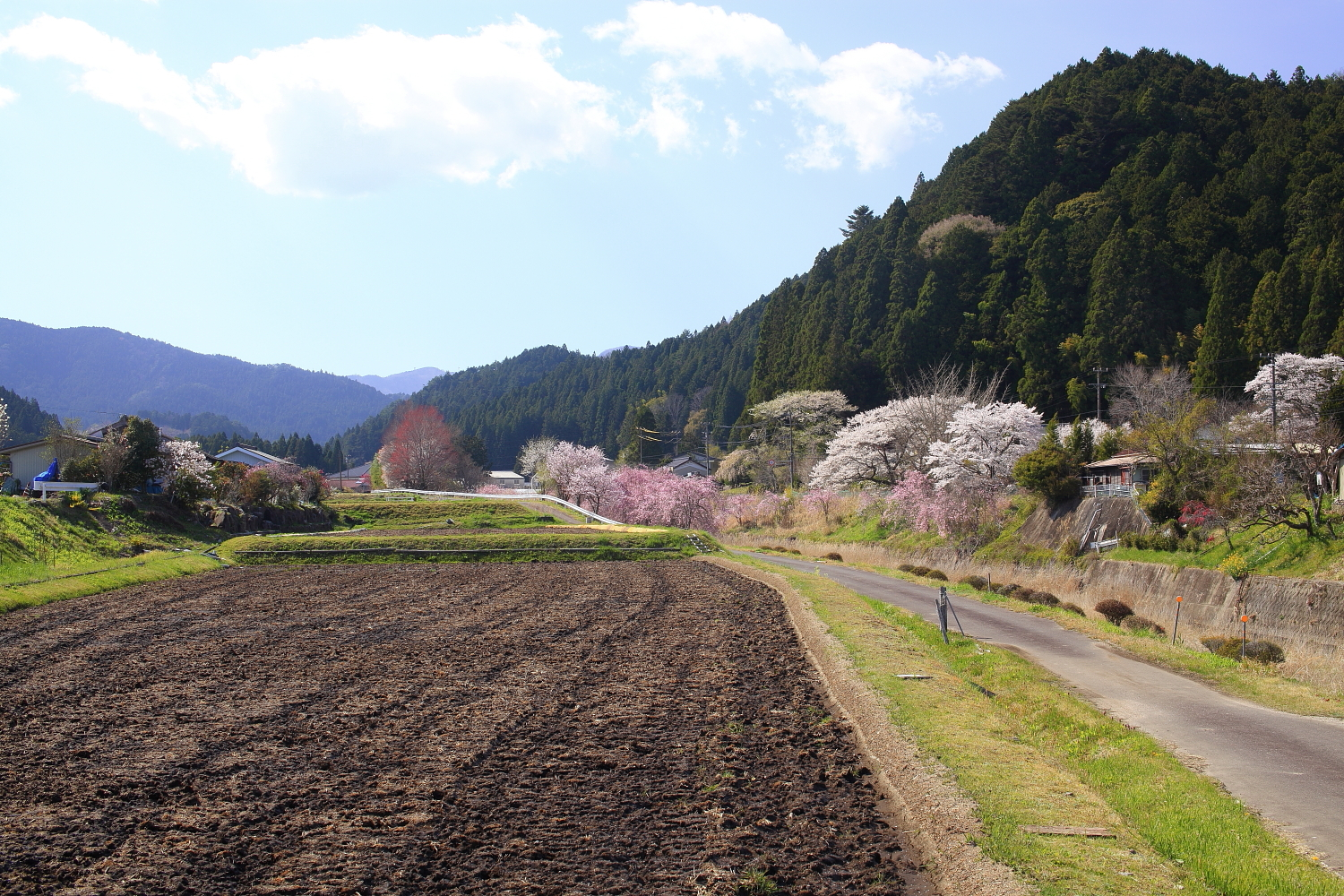
Shimotsugu, Shitara

Shitara (設楽町, Shitara-chō) is a town located in Kitashitara District, Aichi Prefecture, Japan. As of 1 October 2019, the town had an estimated population of 4,531 in 2,133 households, and a population density of 16.5 persons per km^{2}. The total area of the town was 273.94 square kilometres (105.77 sq mi).

== Geography ==
Shitara is located in the extreme northeast corner of Aichi Prefecture. Much of the town's area is covered by mountains and forest, and portions of the town are within the borders of the Tenryū-Okumikawa Quasi-National Park.

=== Neighboring municipalities ===
Aichi Prefecture

- Shinshiro
- Toyota
- Kitashitara District
  - Toei
  - Toyone

Nagano Prefecture

- Shimoina District
  - Neba

== Demographics ==
Per Japanese census data, the population of Shitara has decreased drastically and is only a third of what it was 60 years ago.

Historical population
| Year | Pop. | ±% |
|---|---|---|
| 1960 | 14,975 | — |
| 1970 | 10,732 | −28.3% |
| 1980 | 9,321 | −13.1% |
| 1990 | 8,225 | −11.8% |
| 2000 | 6,959 | −15.4% |
| 2010 | 5,767 | −17.1% |

=== Climate ===
The town has a climate characterized by hot and humid summers, and relatively mild winters (Köppen climate classification Cfa). The average annual temperature in Shitara is 11.9 °C. The average annual rainfall is 2310 mm with September as the wettest month. The temperatures are highest on average in August, at around 23.6 °C, and lowest in January, at around 0.3 °C.

== History ==
During the Edo period, most of present Shitara was tenryō territory under direct control of the Tokugawa shogunate. After the Meiji Restoration, the area was organized into several villages within Kitashitara District with the establishment of the modern municipalities system. Taguchi Village, the site of the district administrative office, was elevated to town status on October 10, 1900. The town of Shitara was established on September 30, 1956, through the merger of Taguchi with the neighboring villages of Damine, Nagura and Furikusa. The village of Tsugu was also formed on the same day through the merger of Kamitsugu and Shimotsugu villages. Shitara and Tsugu merged on October 1, 2005.

== Economy ==
The primary industry of Shitara is agriculture, with rice, tomatoes, cabbage and daikon as the main crops. Production of hydroelectric power generation is also a major contributor to the local economy.

== Education ==
Shitara has five public elementary schools and two public junior high schools operated by the city government, and one public high school operated by the Aichi Prefectural Board of Education.

=== Primary schools ===
- Damine Primary School
- Nagura Primary School
- Seirei Primary School
- Taguchi Primary School
- Tsugu Primary School

=== Junior High schools ===
- Shitara Junior High School
- Tsugu Junior High School

=== High schools ===
- Taguchi High School

=== Foreign Exchange Program ===
- South Middle School (Arlington Heights, IL, USA)
- Thomas Middle School (Arlington Heights, IL, USA)

== Transportation ==
=== Railway ===
Shitara does not have any passenger railway services.

=== Highway ===
- National Route 257
- National Route 420
- National Route 473

== Local attractions ==
- Damine Castle (田峯城) – ruins of a Sengoku period castle
- Kurabune Ruins (鞍船遺跡) – Jōmon period archaeological site excavated in 1922
- Soezawa Onsen - hot spring resort

== Notable people from Shitara ==
- Mitsuzo Sasaki, author
