= Nishikamo District =

Former district in Aichi prefecture, Japan

Coordinates: 35°5′N 137°4′E

Map of Nishikamo District in Aichi Prefecture until 2010

Nishikamo (西加茂郡, Nishikamo-gun) was a district located in Nishimikawa Region in central Aichi Prefecture, Japan.

As of 2004 (the last data available), the district had an estimated population of 16,703 with a density of 43.84 persons per km^{2}. Its total area was 381.06 km^{2}.

== Towns and villages ==
Prior to its dissolution, the district consisted of only one town:

- Miyoshi (Note: Classified as a town.)

== History ==
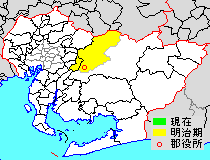
Location of former Nishikamo-gun, Aichi Prefecture, highlighted in yellow.

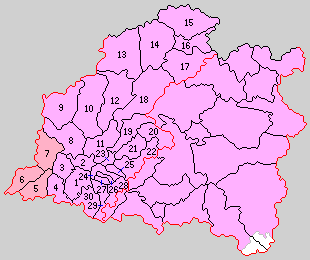
Colored areas are in this district.

Kamo District (加茂郡) was one of the ancient districts of Shinano Province, but was transferred to Mikawa Province during the Sengoku period. In the cadastral reforms of the early Meiji period, on July 22, 1878, Kamo District was divided into Nishikamo District and Higashikamo District within Aichi Prefecture. With the organization of municipalities on October 1, 1889, Nishikamo District was divided into 30 villages.

=== District Timeline ===
The village of Koromo was elevated to town status on January 29, 1892. In a round of consolidation, the remaining number of villages was reduced from 29 to seven in 1906. On March 1, 1951, Koromo gained city status and on April 1, 1953, the village of Sanage gained town status, merging with two neighboring villages on March 1, 1955. The village of Takahashi was annexed by Komoro in 1956. On April 1, 1958, the village of Miyoshi gained town status; however, on April 1, 1967, the town of Sange was merged into the city of Toyota. The village of Fujioka gained town status on April 1, 1978, leaving the district with two towns and one village. On August 5, 2003, Miyoshi rejected plans to merge with the city of Toyota.

=== Recent mergers ===
- On April 1, 2005 - The town of Fujioka, and the village of Obara, along with the towns of Asahi, Asuke and Inabu, and the village of Shimoyama (all from Higashikamo District), were merged into the expanded city of Toyota.
- On January 4, 2010 - The town of Miyoshi was elevated to city status. Therefore, Nishikamo District was dissolved as a result of this merger.

== See also ==
- List of dissolved districts of Japan
- Higashikamo District, Aichi
- Kamo District, Gifu
- Kamo District, Hiroshima
- Kamo District, Shizuoka
