= Kitashitara District =

District in Aichi prefecture, Japan

Coordinates: 35°08′N 137°39′E

Map of Kitashitara District (yellow) in Aichi Prefecture

Kitashitara (北設楽郡, Kitashitara-gun) is a district located in northeastern Aichi Prefecture, Japan.

As of October 1 2019, the district had an estimated population of 8,595 with a density of 15.5 persons per km^{2}. Its total area was 554.51 km^{2}.

== Municipalities ==
The district consists of two towns and one village:

- Shitara (Note: Classified as a town.)
- Tōei
- Toyone (Note: Classified as a village.)

== History ==
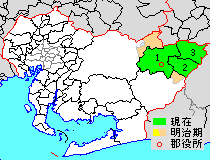
Map showing original extent of Kitashitara District in Aichi Prefecture: * yellow - areas formerly within the district borders during the early Meiji period: 1. Shitara-machi; 2. Tōei-machi; 3. Toyone-mura

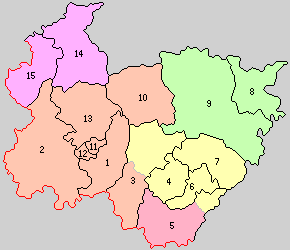
Colored areas are in this district.

Shitara District (設楽郡) was one of the ancient districts of Mikawa Province having been created in 903 out of Hoi District (宝飯郡). In the cadastral reforms of the early Meiji period, on July 22, 1878 Shitara District was divided into Kitashitara District and Minamishitara District. With the organization of municipalities on October 1, 1889, Kitashitara District was divided into 13 villages.

=== District Timeline ===
The Village of Taguchi, the site of the district administrative office, was elevated to town status on October 10, 1900. The village of Hongō was elevated to town status on October 1, 1921. On May 10, 1940, the villages of Inahashi and Busetsu were merged to form the town of Inabu.

On April 1, 1955, the town of Hongō merged with the neighboring villages of Midono, Shimokawa and Sono to form the town of Tōei. The village of Miwa joined the new town the following year, on July 1, 1956. An administrative reorganization later that year left the district with three towns and three villages.

The town of Inabu became part of the now-defunct Higashikamo District on October 1, 2003; which the town was later merged into the city of Toyota on April 1, 2005.

=== Recent mergers ===
- On October 1, 2005 - The village of Tsugu was merged into the expanded town of Shitara.
- On November 27, 2005 - The village of Tomiyama was merged into the expanded village of Toyone.
