= Nukata District =

District in Japan

Coordinates: 34°52′N 137°10′E

Map of Nukata District (yellow) in Aichi Prefecture after 2006

Nukata (額田郡, Nukata-gun) is a district located in central Aichi Prefecture, Japan.

As a result of various consolidations and mergers of municipalities, most of the district was incorporated into the cities of Okazaki and Toyota, and now consists of only the town of Kōta.

As of October 1, 2019, the district had an estimated population of 42,200 with a density of 744 inhabitants per square kilometre (1,930/sq mi). Its total area was 56.72 square kilometres (21.90 sq mi)

== Municipalities ==
The district consists of one town:

- Kōta (Note: Classified as a town.)

== History ==
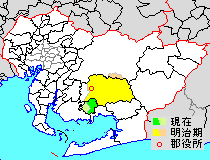
Map showing original extent of Nukata District in Aichi Prefecture: * yellow - areas formerly within the district borders during the early Meiji period: 1. Kōta-machi

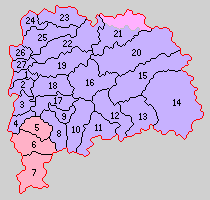
Colored areas are in this district.

Nukata is one of the ancient counties of western Mikawa Province. During the Sengoku period, most of the area of the district was controlled by the Matsudaira clan. In the Edo period, under the Tokugawa shogunate, large portions were administered by the feudal domains of Okazaki Domain, Okutono Domain and Nishi-Ohira Domain. After the Meiji Restoration, the area became the short-lived "Nukata Prefecture", which was then merged into Aichi Prefecture.

=== District Timeline ===
In the cadastral reforms of the early Meiji period, on October 1, 1889, Nukata District was divided into one town (Okazaki) and 26 villages. The village of Fukuoka was raised to town status on November 8, 1893, followed by Hirohata village on May 13, 1895. In a round of consolidation in May 1906, the remaining number of villages was reduced from 24 to 15. The town of Hirohata was annexed by Okazaki on October 1, 1914. Okazaki attained city status on July 1, 1916. The village of Iwazu became a town on September 1, 1928 and later the same year, three neighboring villages were annexed by Okazaki, leaving the district with two towns and 11villages.

Following World War II, on April 1, 1952 the village of Kōta gained town status. On August 1, 1954 the village of Toyosaka (from Hazu District) was merged into the town of Kōta.

The towns of Iwazu and Fukuoka, and the villages of Motojuku, Yamanaka, Fujikawa, Ryudani and Tokiwa were merged into the city of Okazaki on February 1, 1955; and on September 30, 1956, the villages of Toyotomi, Miyazaki, Katano, and parts of Shimoyama were merged to form the town of Nukata.

Despite pressure from the central government, on November 14, 2003 Kōta declined to participate the Okazaki-Nukata Region Merger Conference. As a result of this Conference, on January 1, 2006 Nukata merged into the city of Okazaki, leaving Kōta as the only remaining portion of Nukata District.

=== Recent mergers ===
- On January 1, 2006 - The town of Nukata was merged into the expanded city of Okazaki.
