= Aichi Prefecture =

Prefecture of Japan

Aichi Prefecture 愛知県
- Prefecture

Japanese transcription(s)
  - Japanese: 愛知県
  - Rōmaji: Aichi-ken
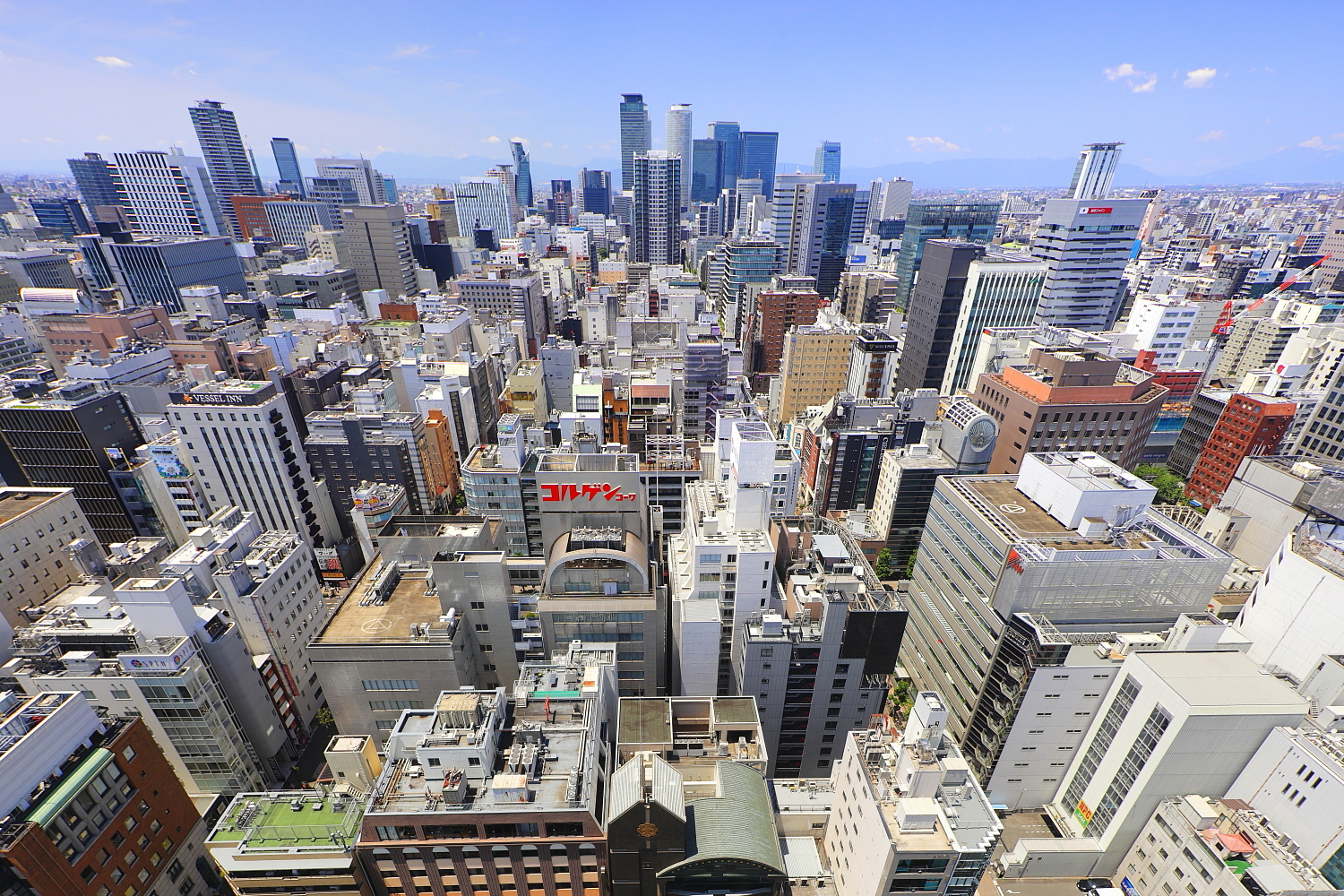
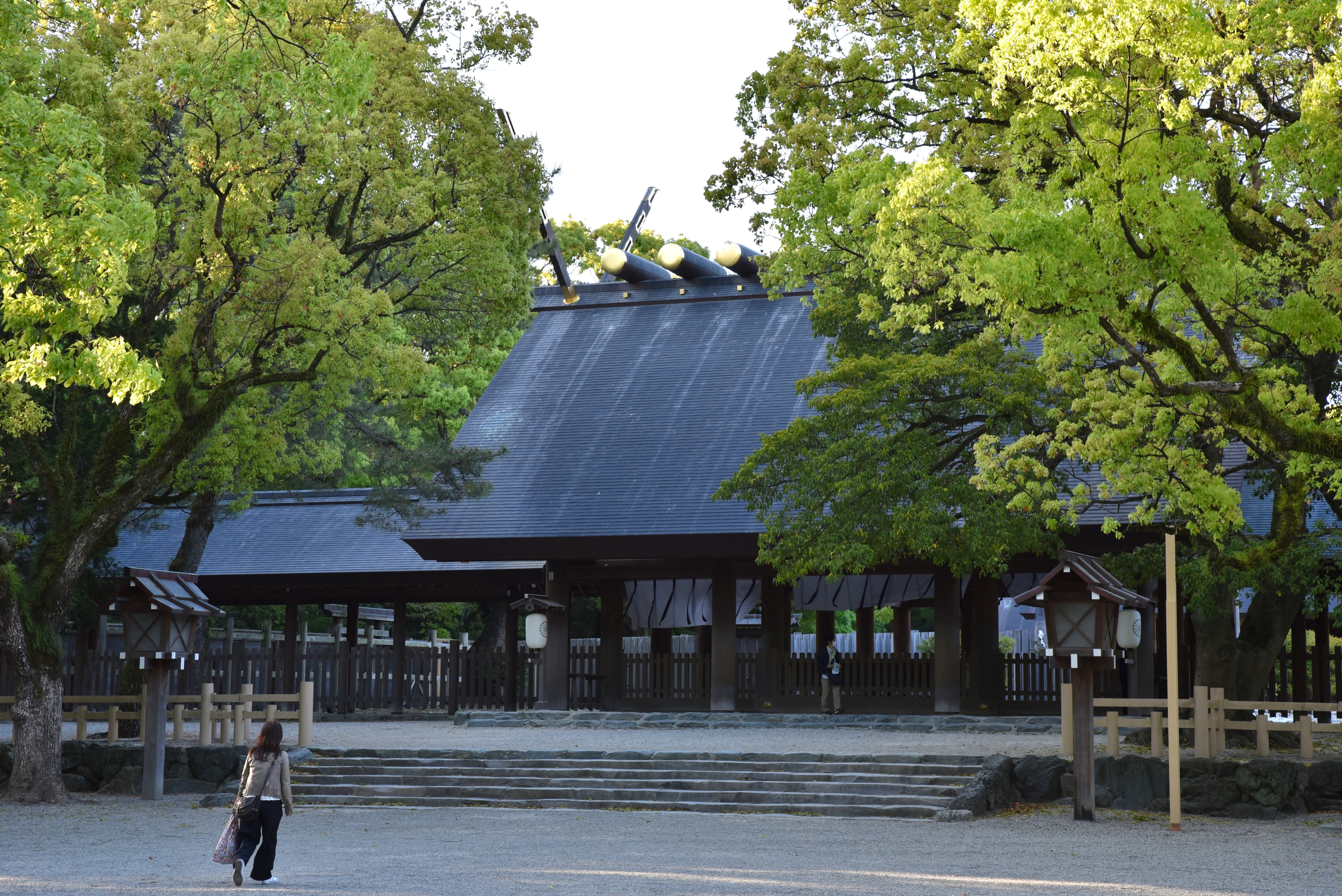
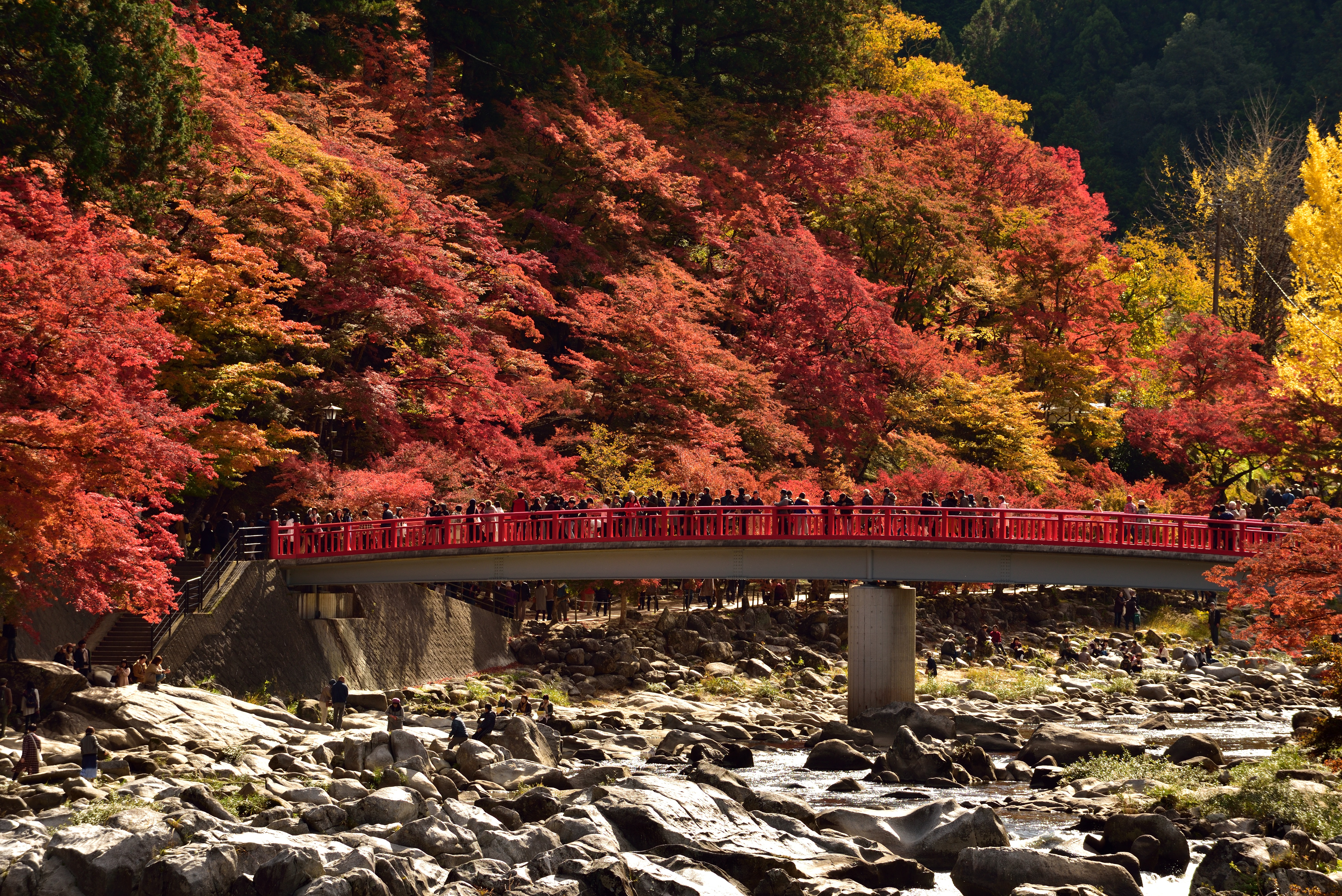
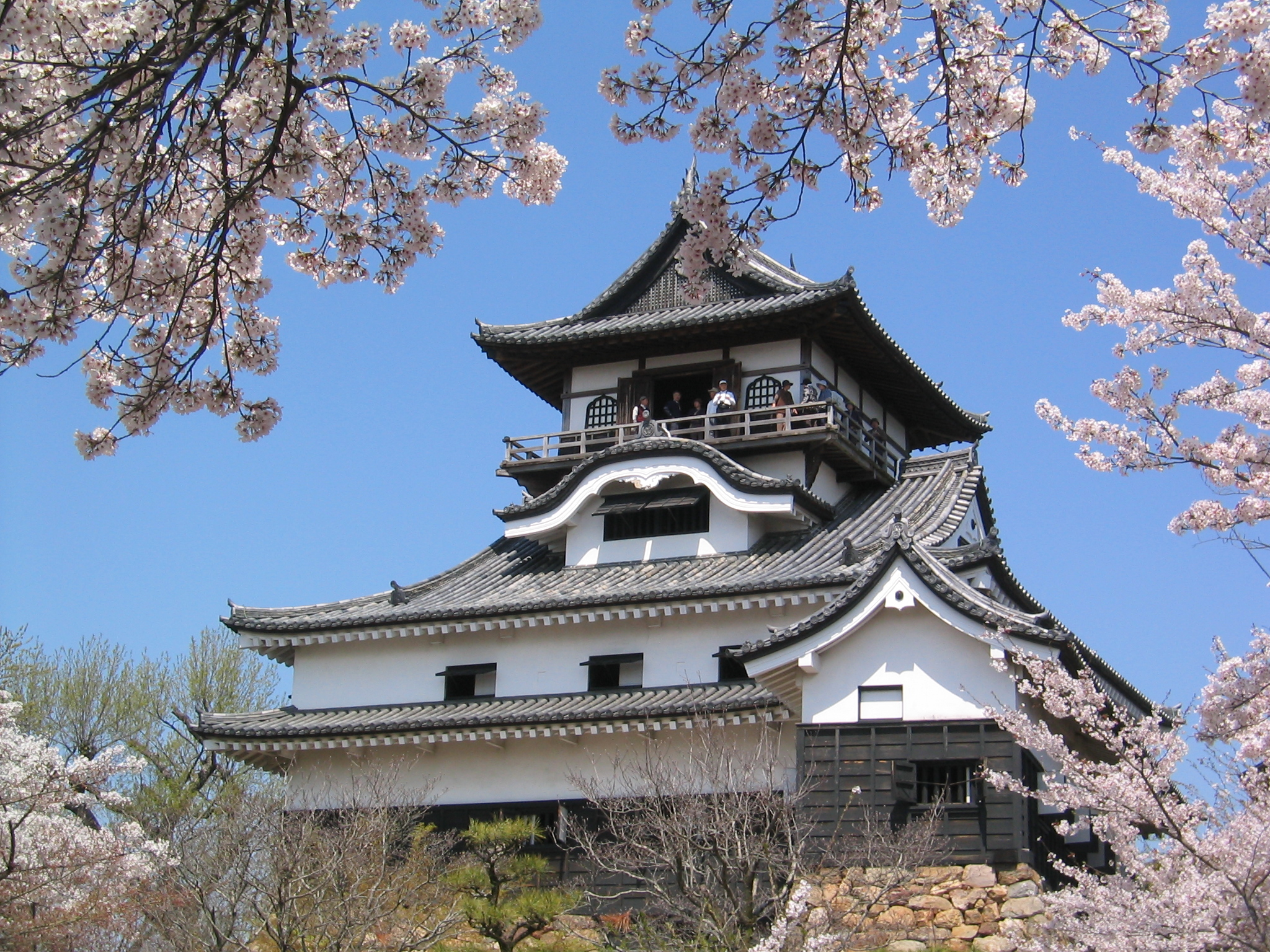
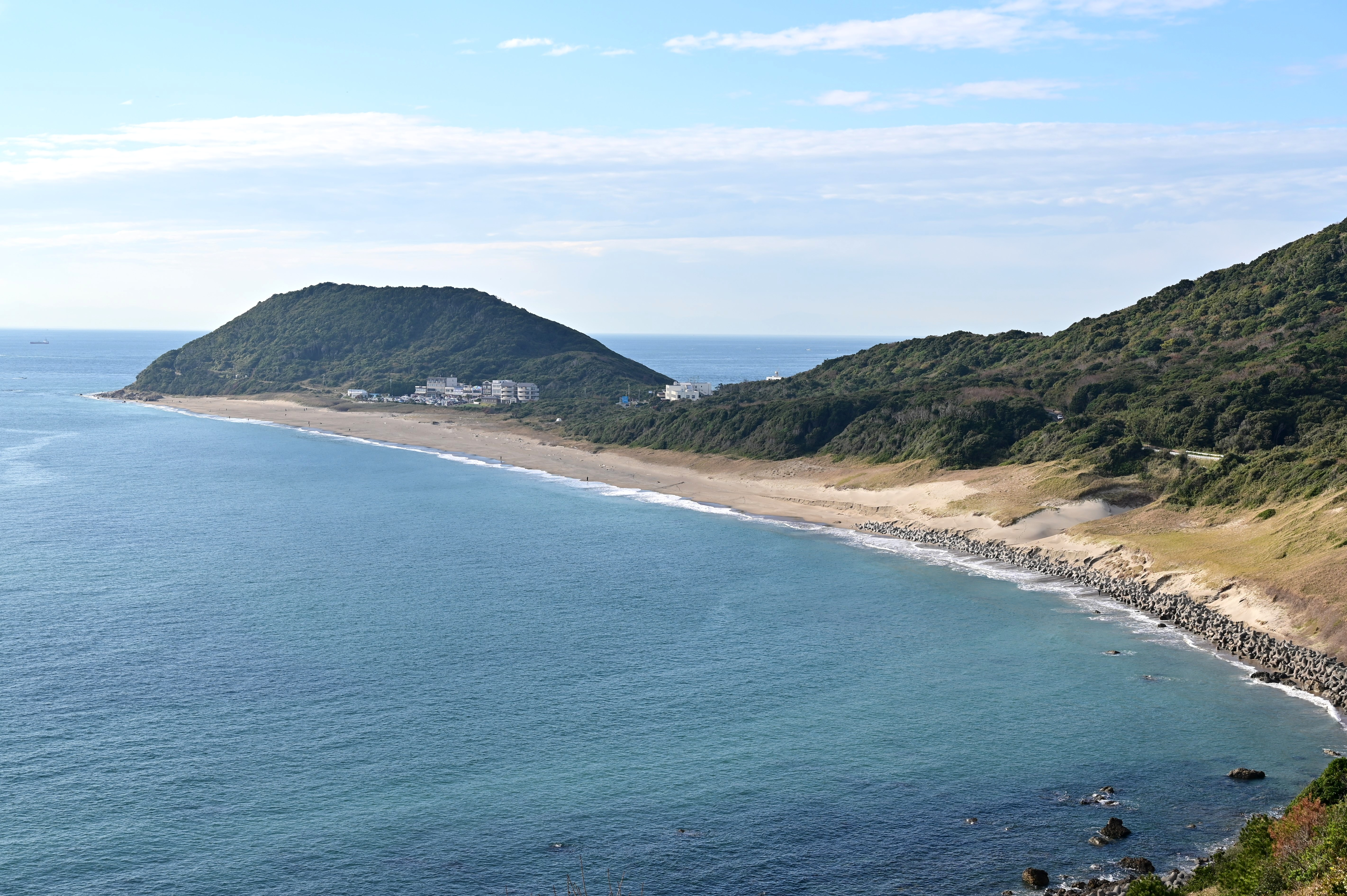
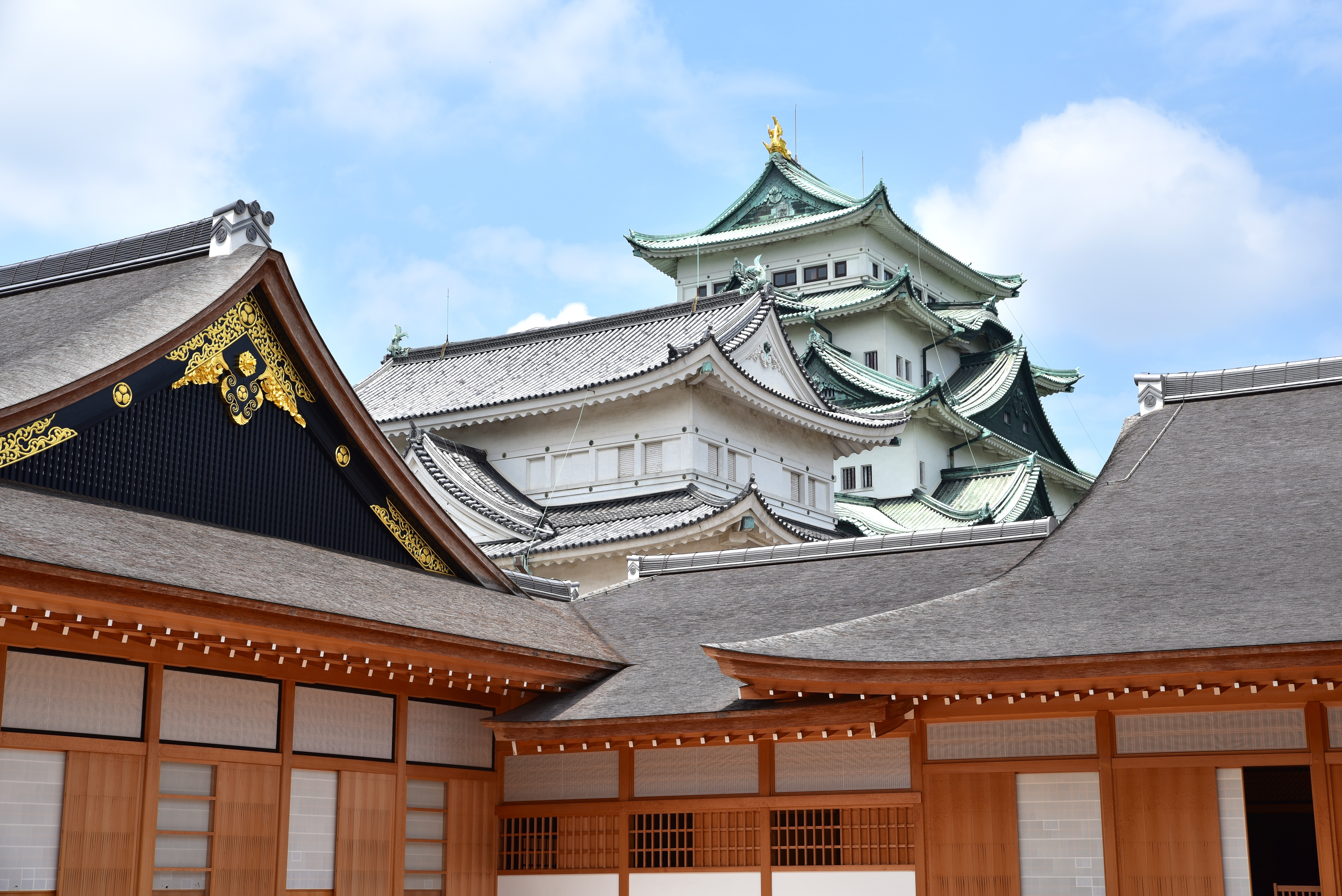
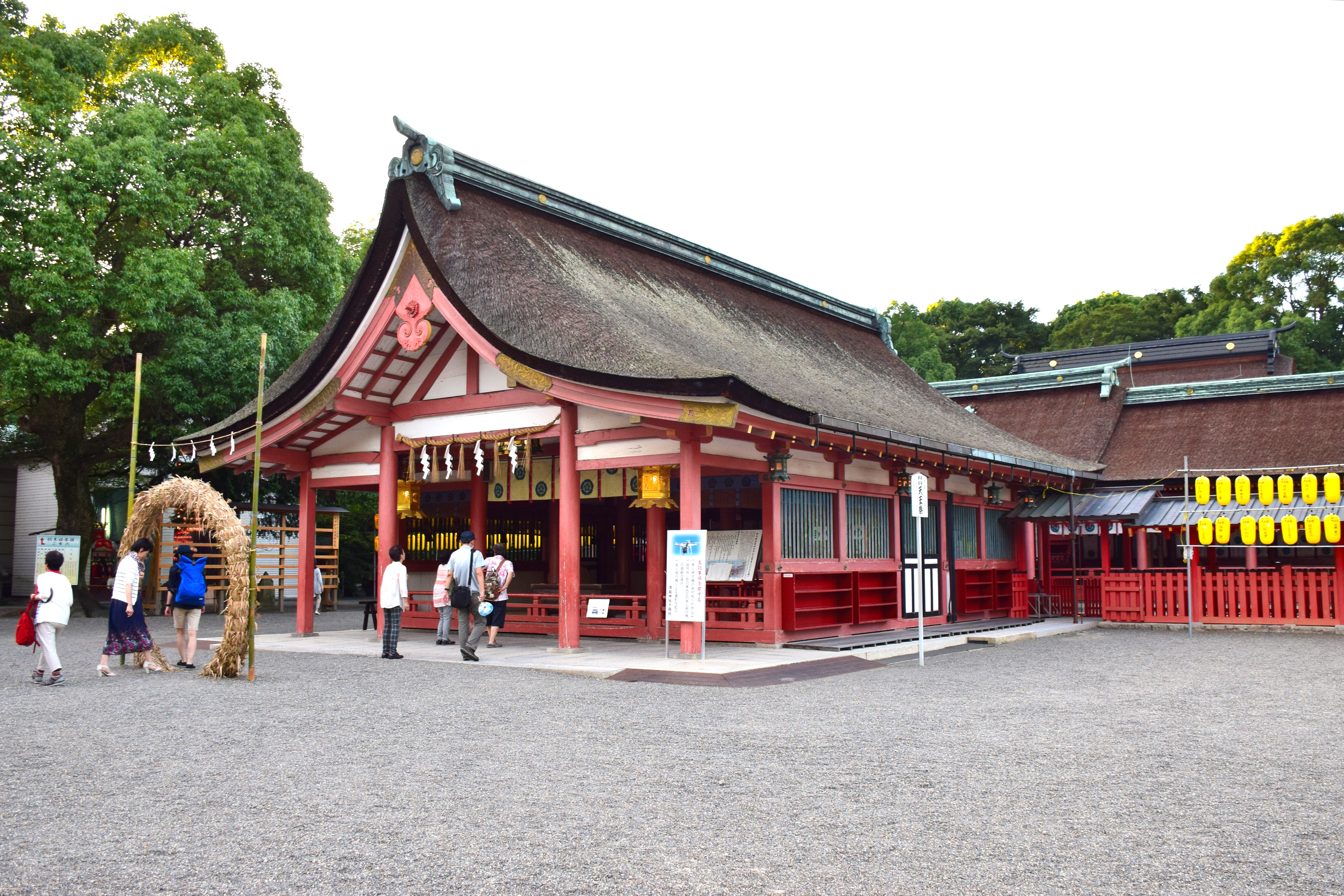
- Skyline of Nagoya Atsuta Shrine Kōrankei Inuyama Castle Cape Irago Nagoya Castle Tsushima Shrine

- Flag Symbol
- Anthem: Warera ga Aichi
- Interactive map of Aichi Prefecture
- Coordinates: 35°10′43″N 136°54′50″E
- Country: Japan
- Region: Chūbu (Tōkai)
- Island: Honshu
- Capital: Nagoya
- Subdivisions: Districts: 7, Municipalities: 54

Government
  - Governor: Hideaki Ōmura (since February 2011)

Area
  - Total: 5,172.92 km^{2} (1,997.28 sq mi)
  - Rank: 27th

Population (1 October 2026)
  - Total: 7,443,459
  - Rank: 4th
  - Density: 1,438.93/km^{2} (3,726.81/sq mi)

GDP (2022)
  - Total: JP¥ 43,083 billion US$ 318.2 billion
- ISO 3166 code: JP-23
- Website: www.pref.aichi.jp/global/en/index.html
- Symbols of Japan
- Bird: Oriental scops owl (Otus sunia japonicus)
- Fish: Kuruma prawn (Penaeus japonicus)
- Flower: Kakitsubata (Iris laevigata)
- Tree: Hananoki (Acer pycnanthum)

Aichi Prefecture (愛知県, Aichi-ken; Japanese pronunciation: [ä́ì.c̟͡ɕì, ä̀í.c̟͡ɕi̥.kè̞ɴ̀]) is a prefecture of Japan located in the Chūbu region of Honshū. Aichi Prefecture has a population of 7,461,111 (as of 1 January 2025) and a geographic area of 5,172.92 square kilometres (1,997.28 sq mi) with a population density of 1,442 inhabitants per square kilometre (3,730/sq mi). Aichi Prefecture borders Mie Prefecture to the west, Gifu Prefecture and Nagano Prefecture to the north, and Shizuoka Prefecture to the east. Nagoya is the capital and largest city of the prefecture.

Nagoya is the capital and largest city of Aichi Prefecture, and the fourth-largest city in Japan. Other major cities include Toyota, Okazaki, and Ichinomiya. Aichi Prefecture and Nagoya form the core of the Chūkyō metropolitan area, the third-largest metropolitan area in Japan and one of the largest metropolitan areas in the world. Aichi Prefecture is located on Japan's Pacific Ocean coast and forms part of the Tōkai region, a subregion of the Chūbu region and Kansai region. Aichi Prefecture is home to the Toyota Motor Corporation. Aichi Prefecture had many locations with the Higashiyama Zoo and Botanical Gardens, the Chubu Centrair International Airport, and the Legoland Japan Resort.

== Geography ==
Map of Aichi Prefecture Government Ordinance Designated City City Town Village

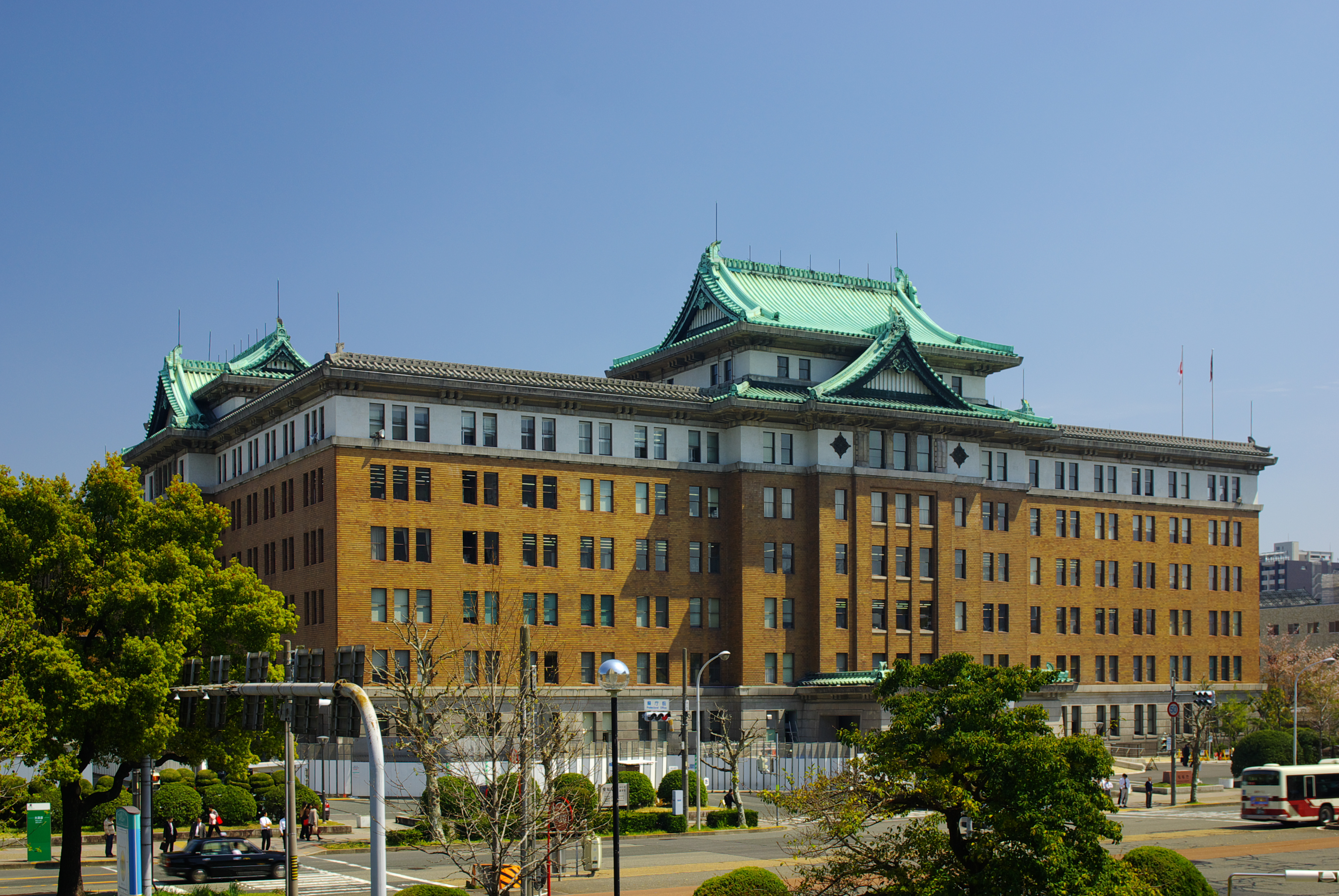
Aichi Prefectural Government Office

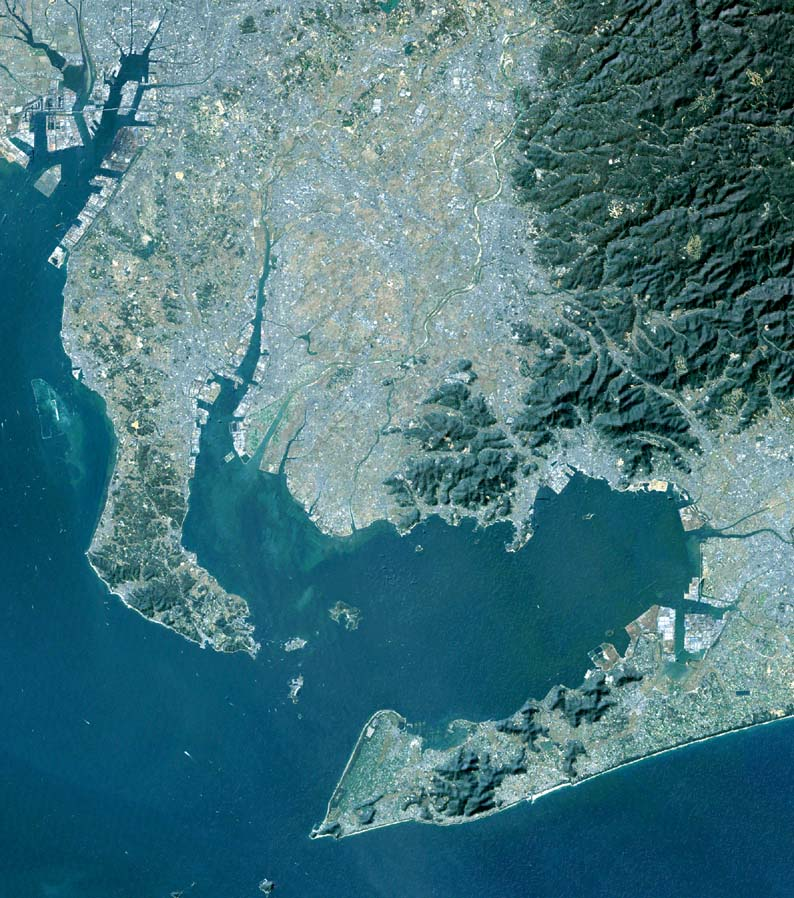
Satellite photo of Mikawa Bay

Located near the centre of the Japanese main island of Honshu, Aichi Prefecture faces the Ise and Mikawa Bays to the south and borders Shizuoka Prefecture to the east, Nagano Prefecture to the northeast, Gifu Prefecture to the north, and Mie Prefecture to the west. It measures 106 km (66 mi) east to west and 94 km (58 mi) south to north and forms a major portion of the Nōbi Plain. With an area of 5,172.48 square kilometres (1,997.11 sq mi) it accounts for approximately 1.36% of the total surface area of Japan. The highest spot is Chausuyama at 1,415 m (4,642 ft) above sea level.

The western part of the prefecture is dominated by Nagoya, Japan's third largest city, and its suburbs, while the eastern part is less densely populated but still contains several major industrial centres. Due to its robust economy, for the period from October 2005 to October 2006, Aichi was the fastest growing prefecture in terms of population, beating Tokyo, at 7.4% and around with after Saitama Prefecture.

As of 1 April 2012, 23% of the total land area of the prefecture was designated as Natural Parks, namely the Aichi Kōgen, Hida-Kisogawa, Mikawa Wan, and Tenryū-Okumikawa Quasi-National Parks along with seven Prefectural Natural Parks.

=== Cities ===
Thirty-eight cities are located in Aichi Prefecture.

Name		Area (km^{2})	Population	Map
Rōmaji	Kanji	Area (km^{2})	Population	Map
Aisai	愛西市	66.70	61,320	
Ama	あま市	27.49	87,651	
Anjō	安城市	86.05	188,693	
Chiryū	知立市	16.31	71,992	
Chita	知多市	45.90	83,891	
Gamagōri	蒲郡市	56.92	80,063	
Handa	半田市	47.42	118,259	
Hekinan	碧南市	36.68	72,864	
Ichinomiya	一宮市	113.82	380,073	
Inazawa	稲沢市	79.35	135,580	
Inuyama	犬山市	74.90	73,420	
Iwakura	岩倉市	10.47	47,929	
Kariya	刈谷市	50.39	153,162	
Kasugai	春日井市	92.78	306,764	
Kitanagoya	北名古屋市	18.37	86,068	
Kiyosu	清須市	17.35	69,687	
Komaki	小牧市	62.81	148,872	
Kōnan	江南市	30.20	97,903	
Miyoshi	みよし市	32.19	62,782	
Nagakute	長久手市	21.55	61,503	
Nagoya (capital)	名古屋市	326.45	2,337,864	
Nishio	西尾市	161.22	169,984	
Nisshin	日進市	34.91	91,795	
Ōbu	大府市	33.66	92,179	
Okazaki	岡崎市	387.20	386,999	
Owariasahi	尾張旭市	21.03	81,954	
Seto	瀬戸市	111.40	127,659	
Shinshiro	新城市	499.23	44,581	
Tahara	田原市	191.12	60,206	
Takahama	高浜市	13.11	48,736	
Tōkai	東海市	43.43	113,698	
Tokoname	常滑市	55.90	57,872	
Toyoake	豊明市	23.22	69,525	
Toyohashi	豊橋市	261.86	377,453	
Toyokawa	豊川市	161.14	183,930	
Toyota	豊田市	918.32	426,162	
Tsushima	津島市	25.09	61,647	
Yatomi	弥富市	49.00	44,589	

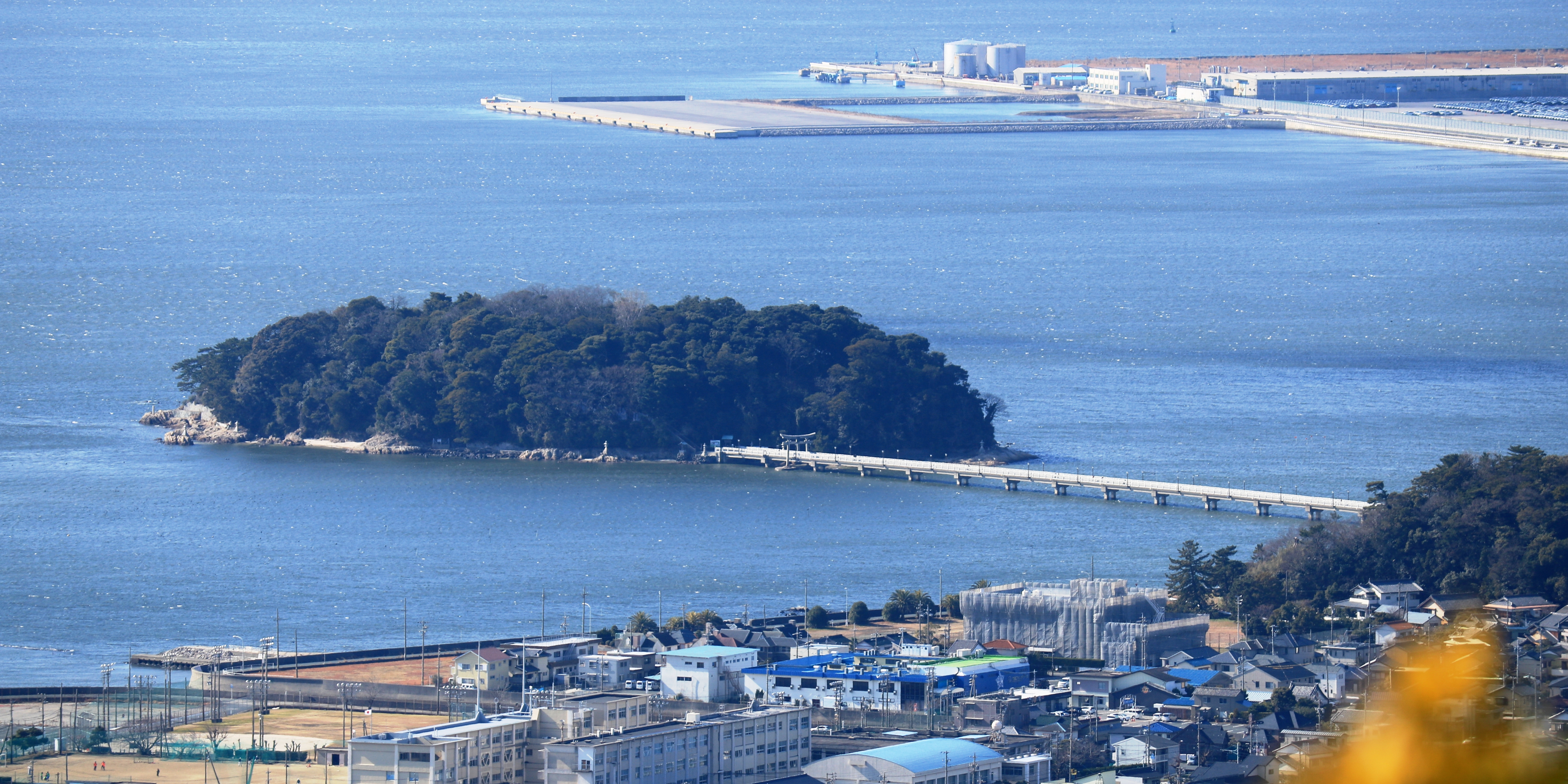
Gamagōri

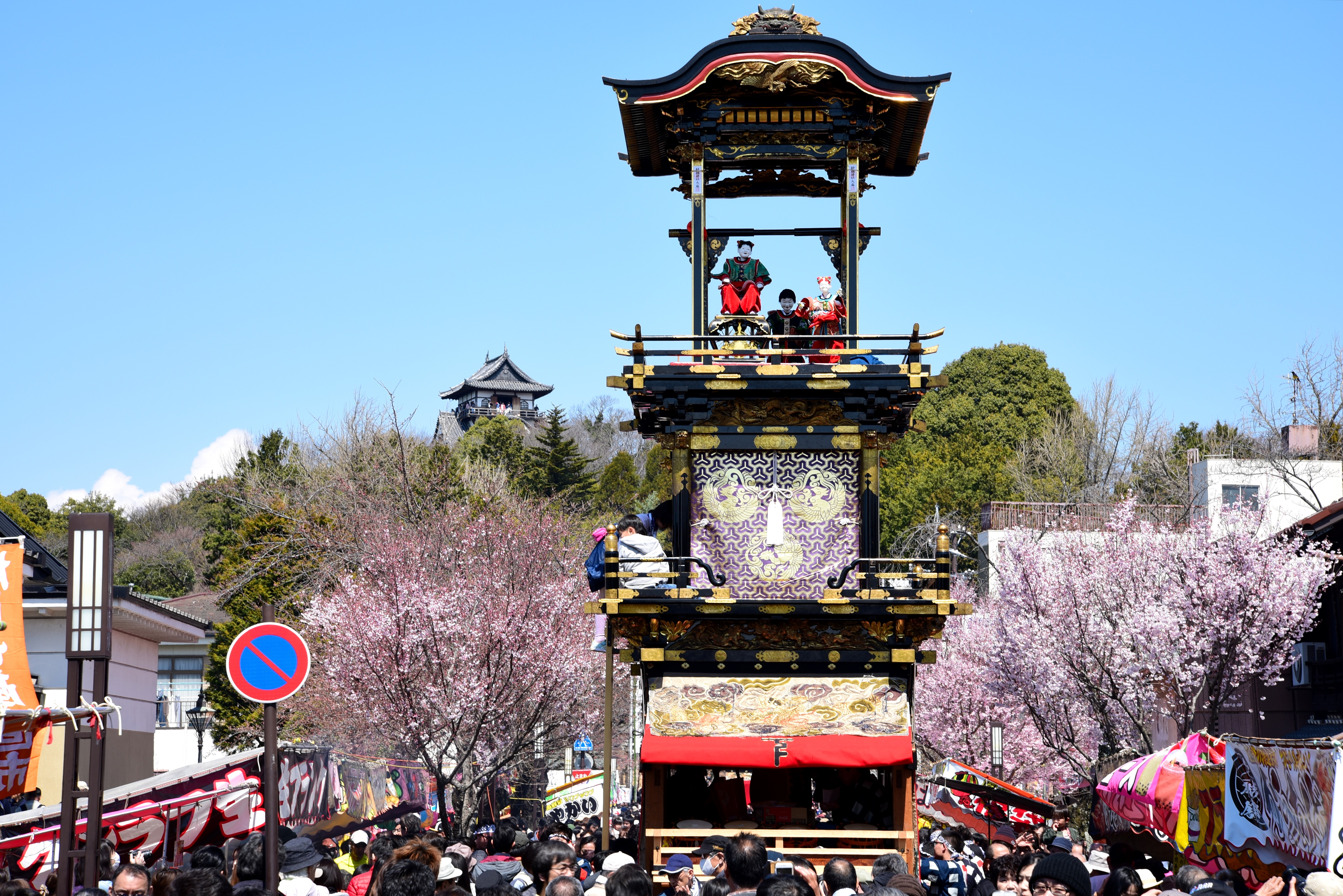
Inuyama

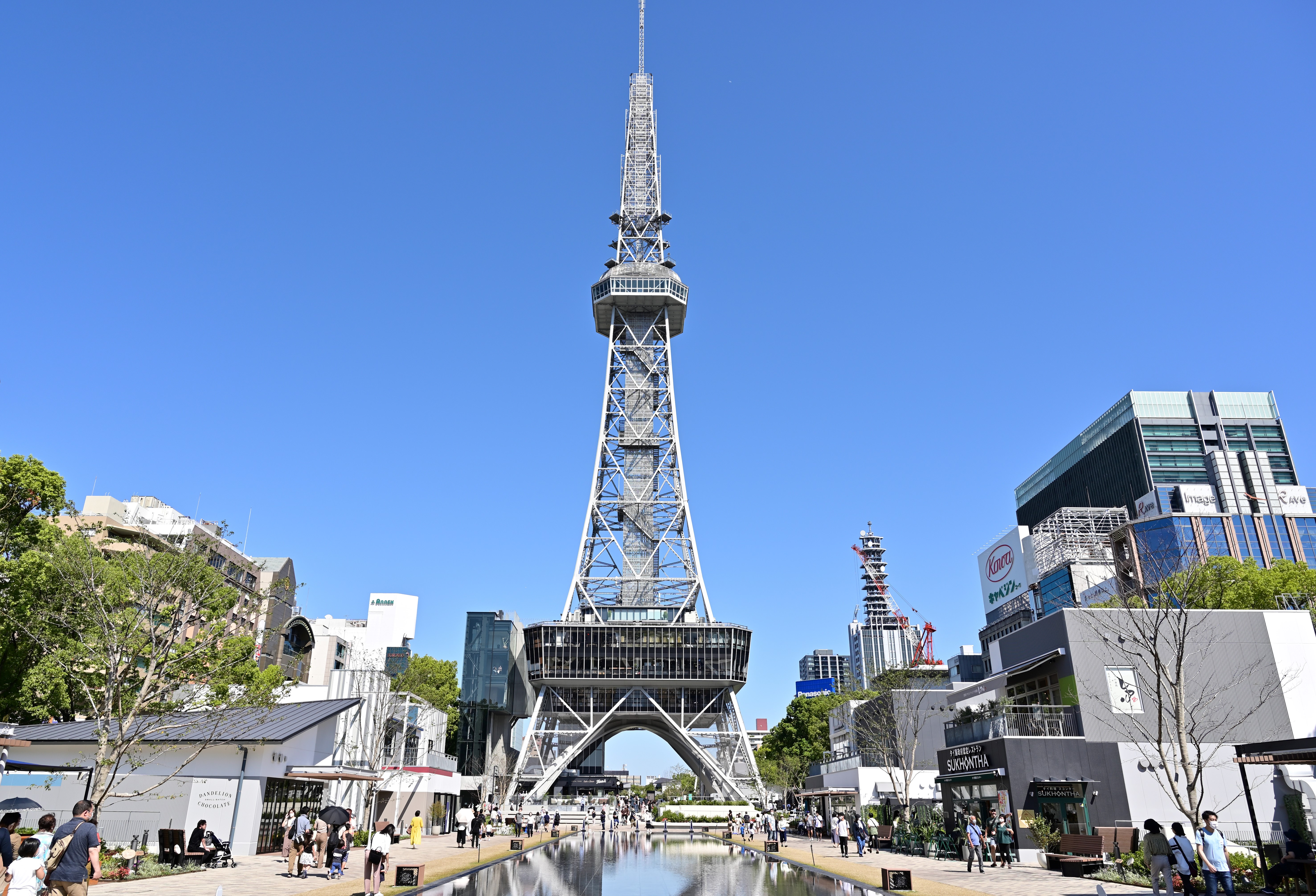
Nagoya

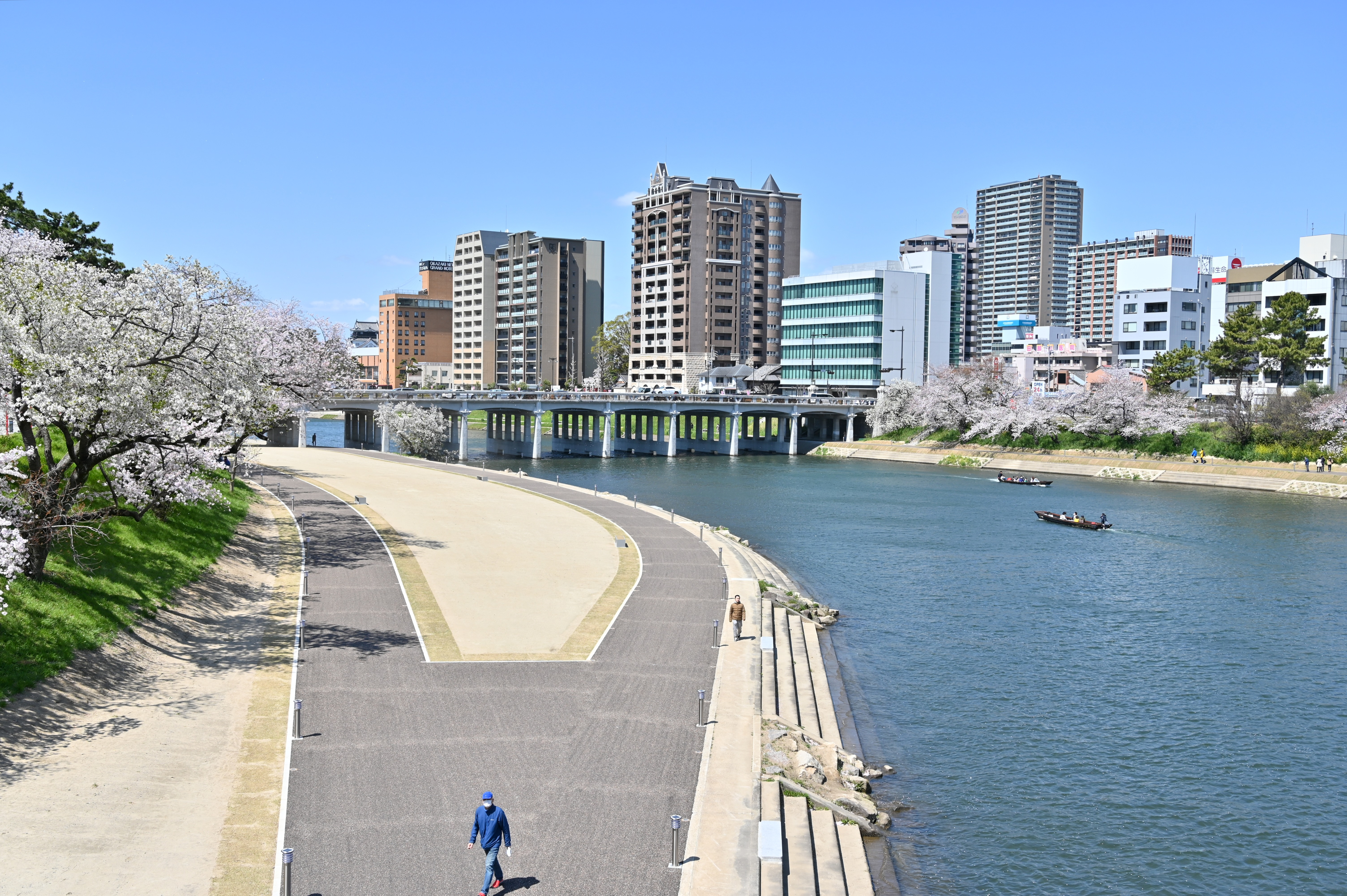
Okazaki

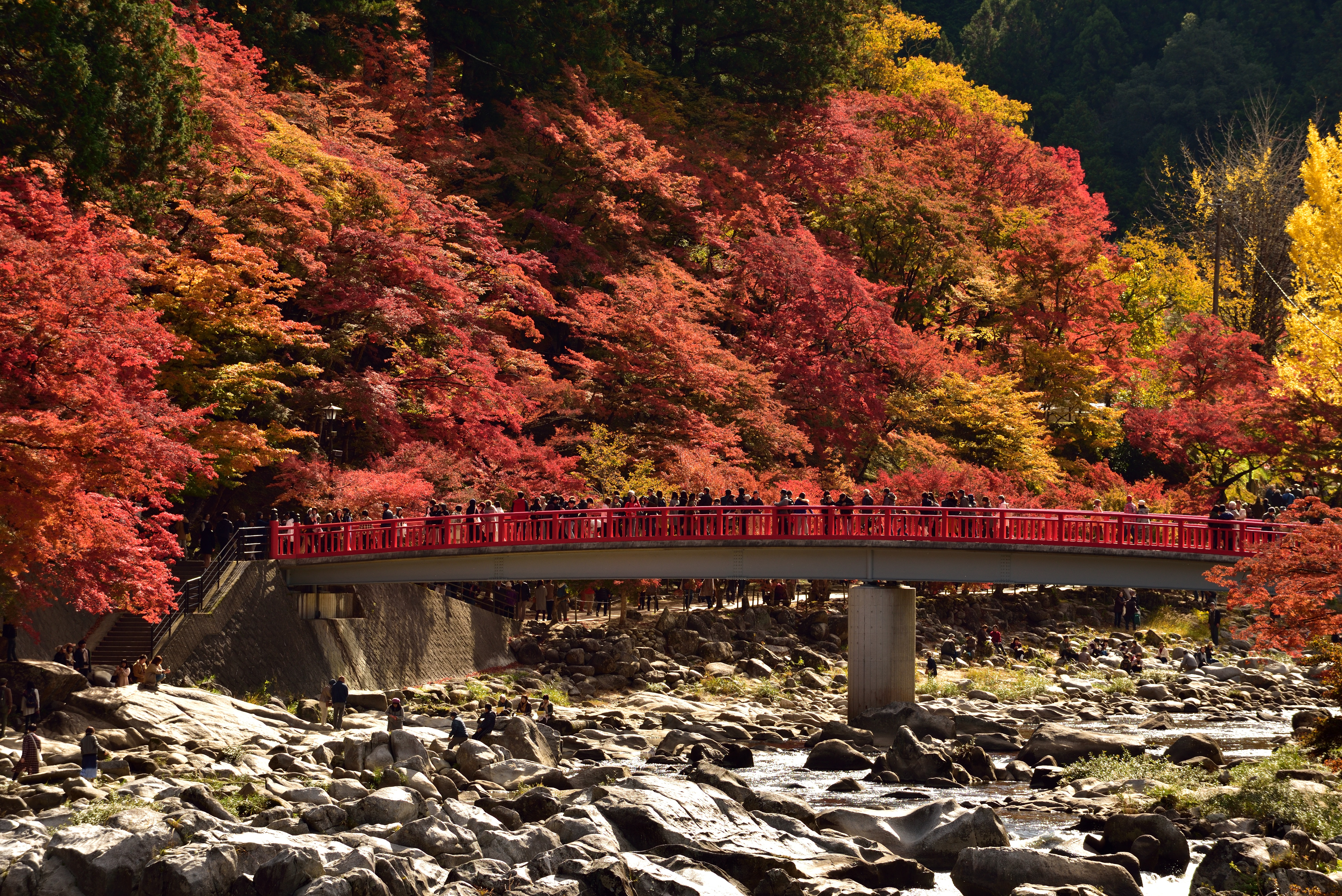
Toyota

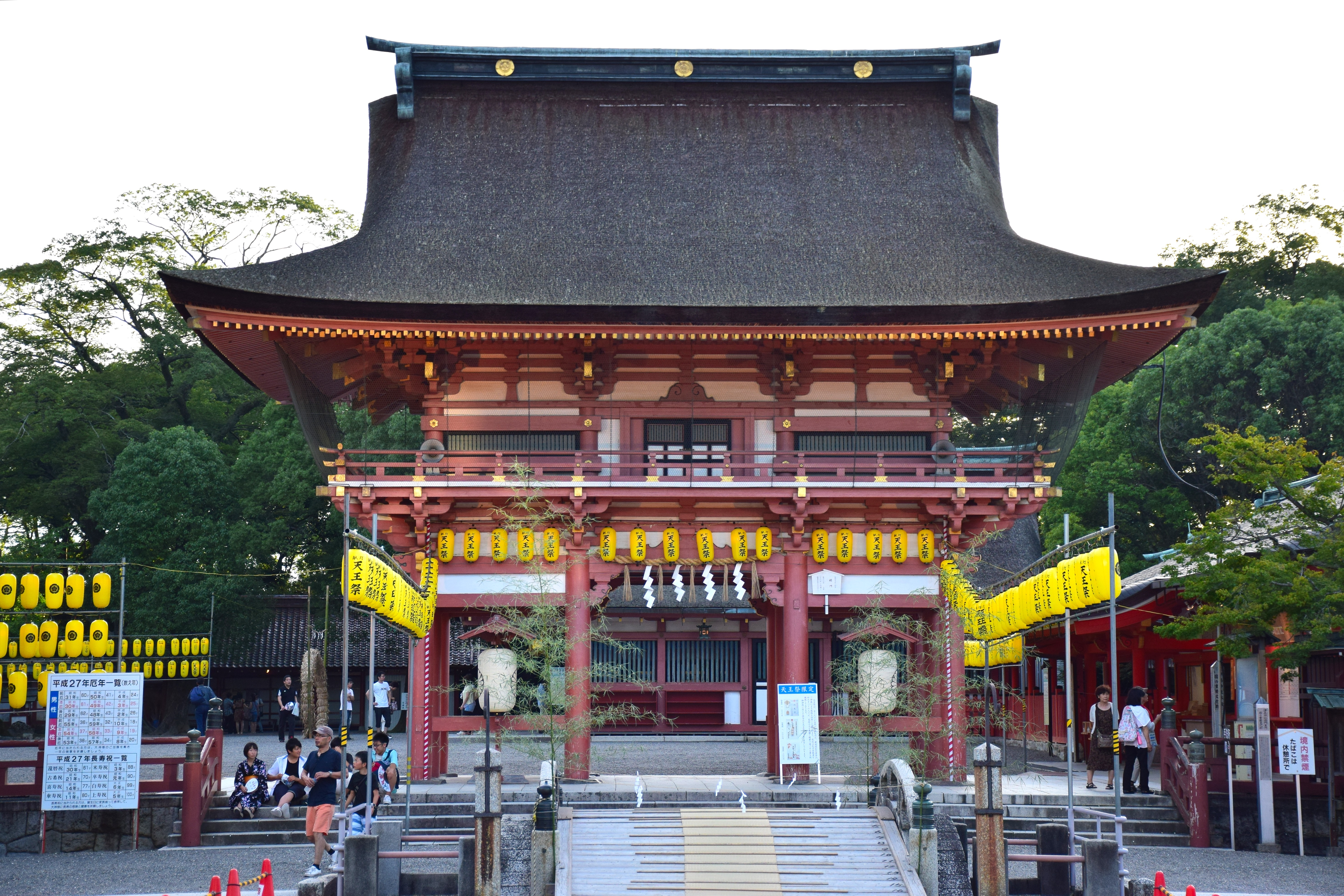
Tsushima

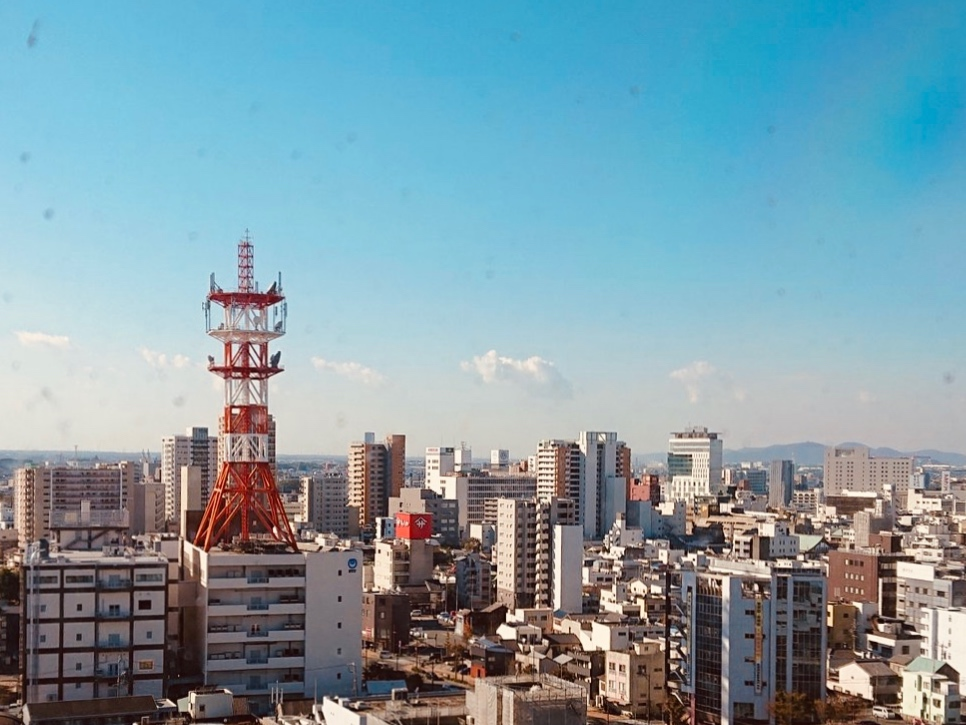
Toyohashi

=== Towns and villages ===
These are the towns and villages in each district:

Name		Area (km^{2})	Population	District	Map
Rōmaji	Kanji	Area (km^{2})	Population	District	Map
Agui	阿久比町	23.80	28,291	Chita District	
Fusō	扶桑町	11.19	34,144	Niwa District	
Higashiura	東浦町	31.14	50,182	Chita District	
Kanie	蟹江町	11.09	37,082	Ama District	
Kōta	幸田町	56.72	42,200	Nukata District	
Mihama	美浜町	46.20	22,701	Chita District	
Minamichita	南知多町	38.37	17,393	Chita District	
Ōguchi	大口町	13.61	24,160	Niwa District	
Ōharu	大治町	6.59	32,318	Ama District	
Shitara	設楽町	273.94	4,531	Kitashitara District	
Taketoyo	武豊町	26.38	43,147	Chita District	
Tobishima	飛島村	22.42	4,609	Ama District	
Tōei	東栄町	123.38	3,033	Kitashitara District	
Tōgō	東郷町	18.03	44,109	Aichi District	
Toyone	豊根村	155.88	1,031	Kitashitara District	
Toyoyama	豊山町	6.18	15,630	Nishikasugai District	

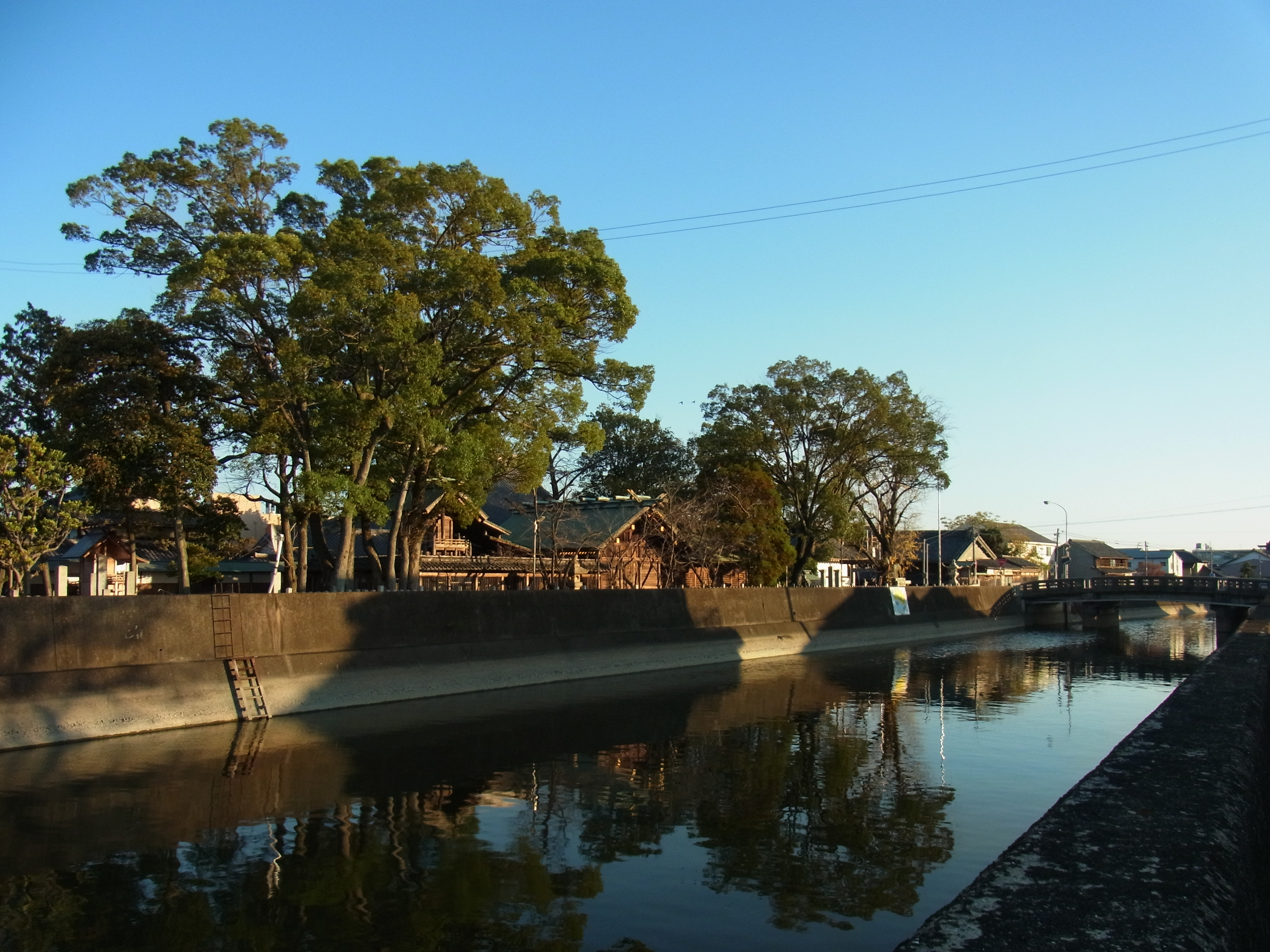
Ama District, Kanie

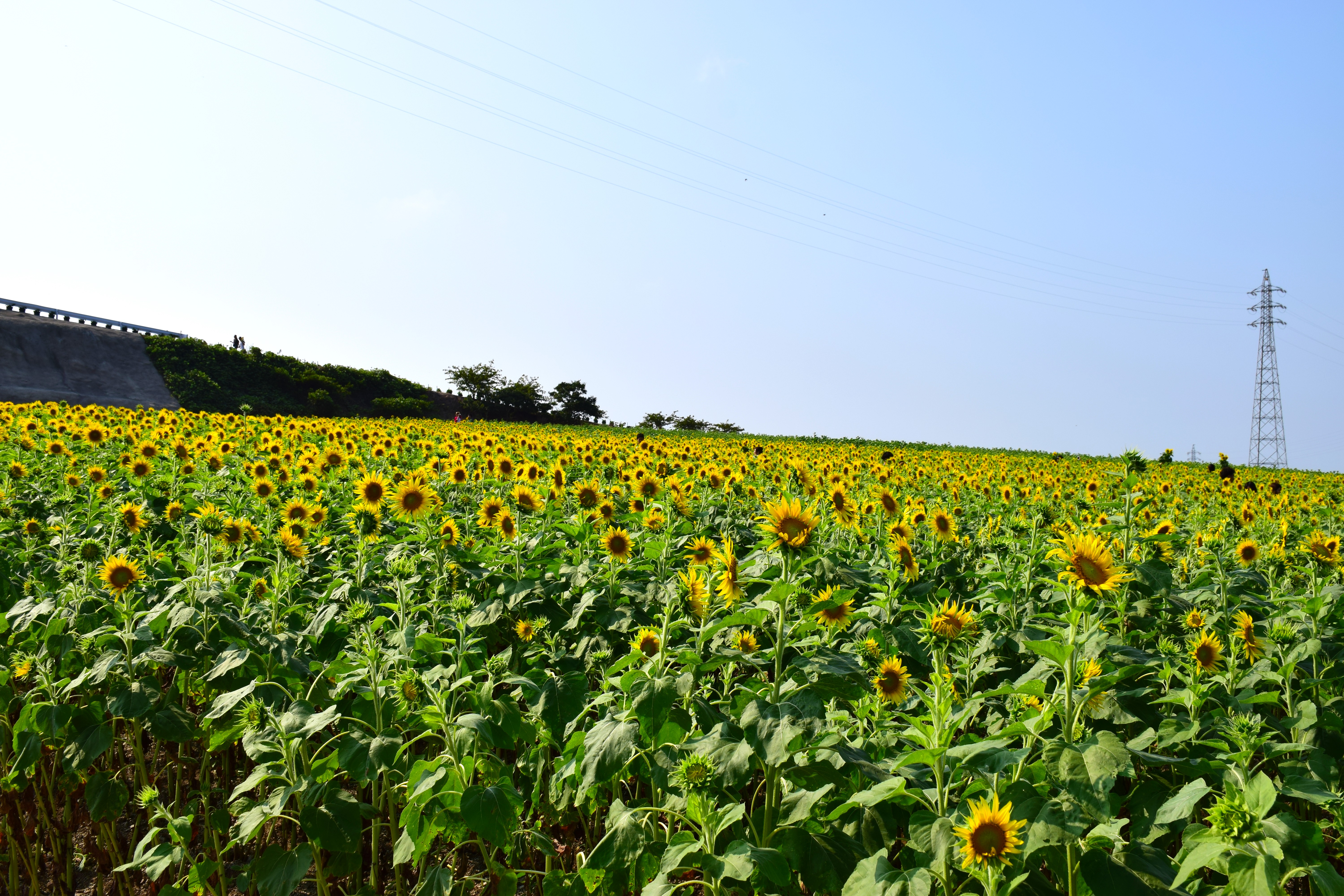
Chita District, Minamichita

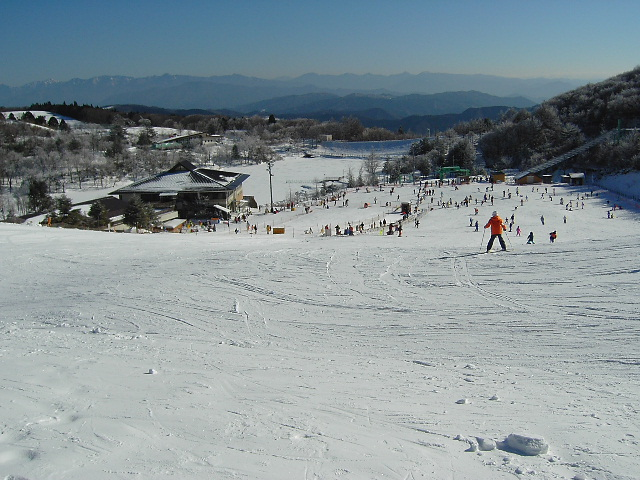
Kitashitara District, Toyone

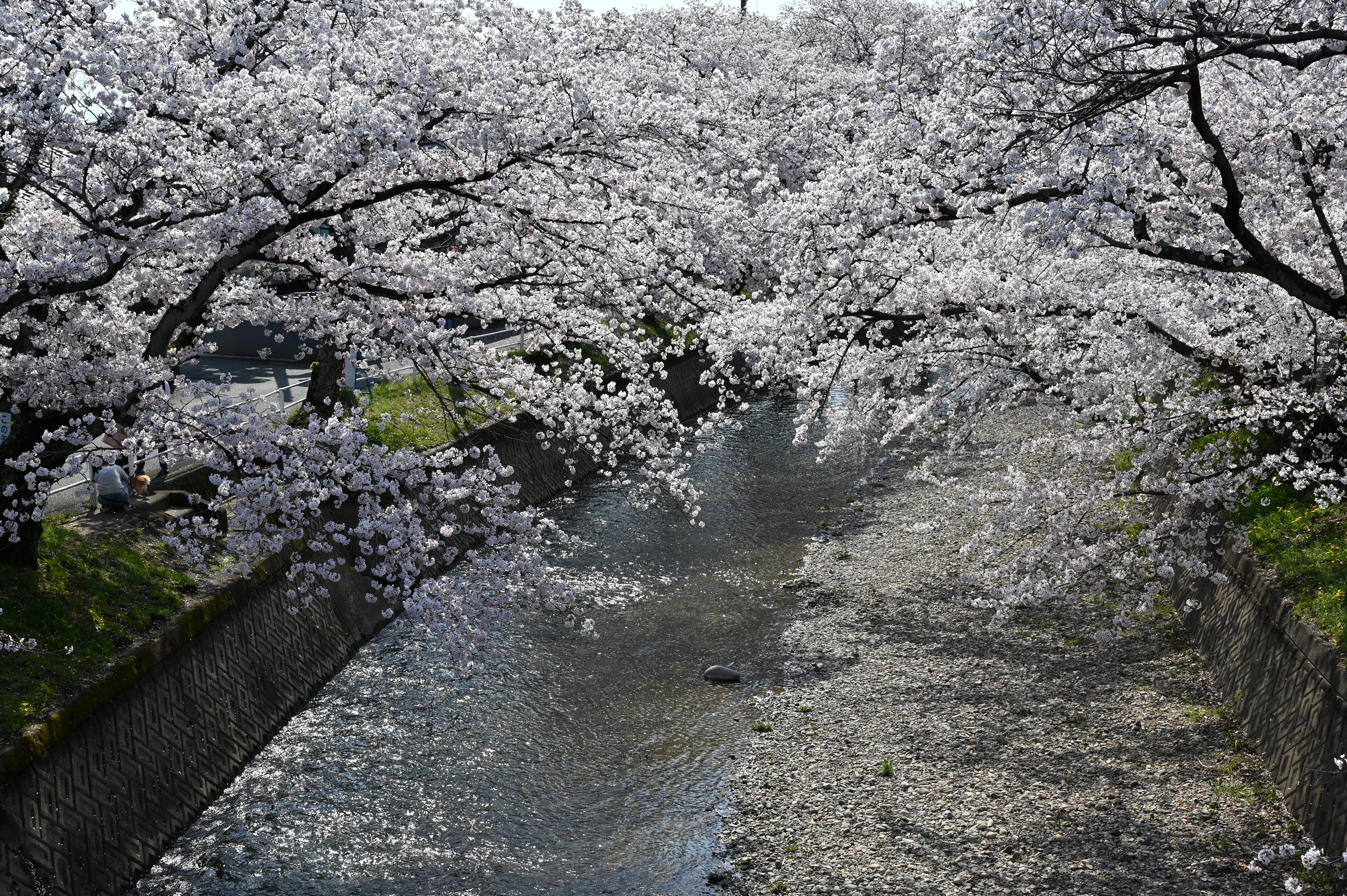
Niwa District, Ōguchi

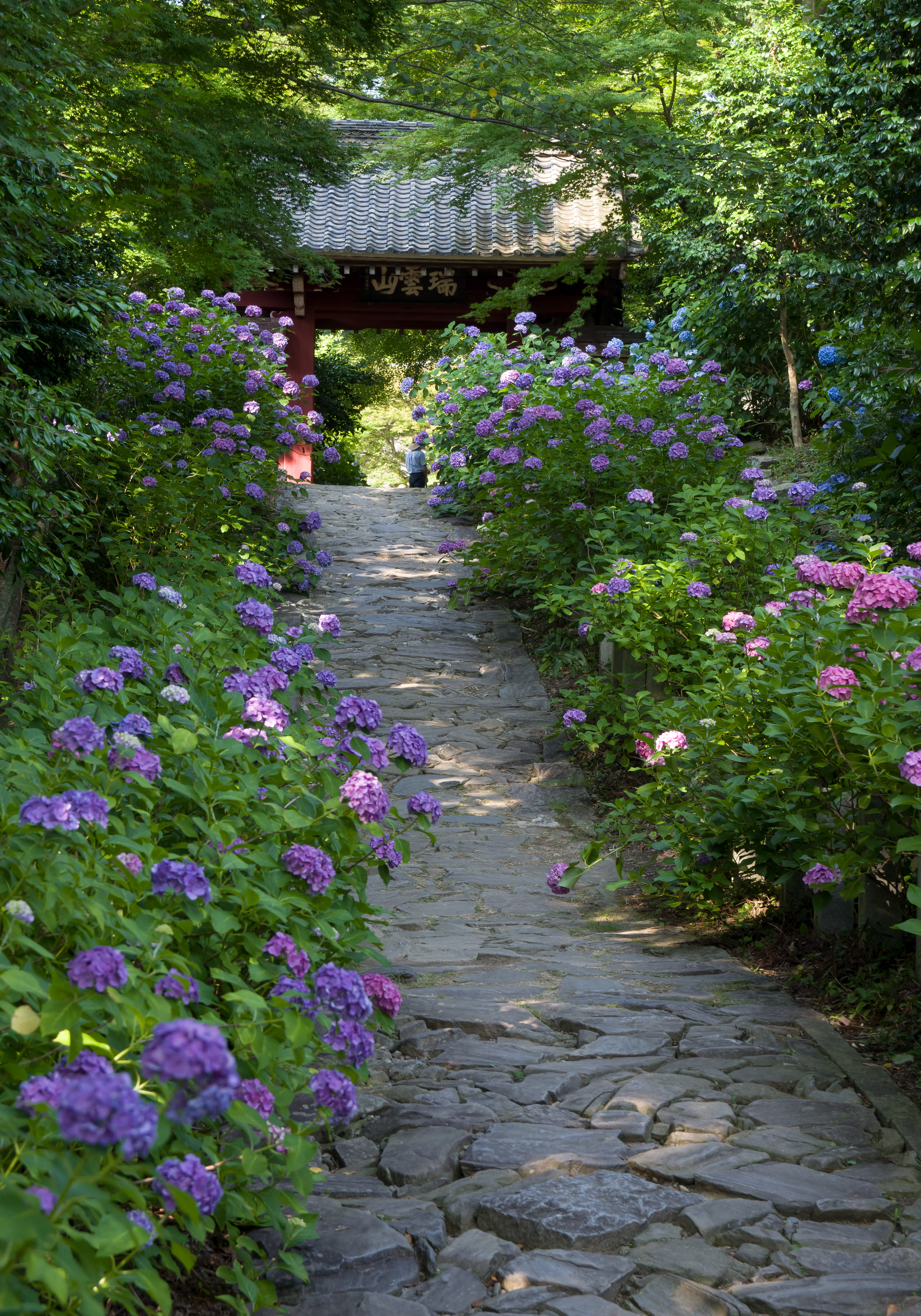
Nukata District, Kōta

=== Demographics ===
Aichi prefecture population pyramid in 2020

Historical population
Year	Pop.	±% p.a.
1890	1,473,099	—
1903	1,752,042	+1.34%
1913	2,073,224	+1.70%
1920	2,089,762	+0.11%
1925	2,319,494	+2.11%
1930	2,567,413	+2.05%
1935	2,862,701	+2.20%
1940	3,166,592	+2.04%
1945	2,857,851	−2.03%
1950	3,390,585	+3.48%
1955	3,769,209	+2.14%
1960	4,206,313	+2.22%
1965	4,798,653	+2.67%
1970	5,386,163	+2.34%
1975	5,923,569	+1.92%
1980	6,221,638	+0.99%
1985	6,455,172	+0.74%
1990	6,690,603	+0.72%
1995	6,868,336	+0.53%
2000	7,043,300	+0.50%
2005	7,254,704	+0.59%
2010	7,410,719	+0.43%
2015	7,484,094	+0.20%
Source: Statistics Bureau, Ministry of Internal Affairs and Communications

As of 2001, Aichi Prefecture's population was 50.03% male and 49.97% female. 139,540 residents (nearly 2% of the population) are of foreign nationality.

==== Population by age (2001) ====
Age	% population	% male	% female
0–9	10.21	10.45	9.96
10–19	10.75	11.02	10.48
20–29	15.23	15.71	14.75
30–39	14.81	15.31	14.30
40–49	12.21	12.41	12.01
50–59	15.22	15.31	15.12
60–69	11.31	11.22	11.41
70–79	6.76	6.01	7.52
Over 80	3.12	2.01	4.23
Unknown	0.38	0.54	0.23

== History ==
Originally, the region was divided into two provinces of Owari and Mikawa. After the Meiji Restoration, Owari and Mikawa were united into a single entity. In 1871, after the abolition of the han system, Owari, with the exception of the Chita Peninsula, was established as Nagoya Prefecture, while Mikawa combined with the Chita Peninsula and formed Nukata Prefecture. Nagoya Prefecture was renamed to Aichi Prefecture in April 1872 and was united with Nukata Prefecture on 27 November of the same year.

The government of Aichi Prefecture is located in the Aichi Prefectural Government Office in Nagoya, which is the old capital of Owari. The Aichi Prefectural Police and its predecessor organisations have been responsible for law enforcement in the prefecture since 1871.

The Expo 2005 World Exposition was held in Seto and Nagakute.

=== Etymology ===
In the third volume of the Man'yōshū there is a poem by Takechi Kurohito that reads: "The cry of the crane, calling to Sakurada; it sounds like the tide, draining from Ayuchi flats, hearing the crane cry". Ayuchi is the original form of the name Aichi, and the Fujimae tidal flat is all that remains of the earlier Ayuchi-gata. It is now a protected area.

For a time, an Aichi Station existed on the Kansai Line (at the time the Kansai Railway) between Nagoya and Hatta stations, but its role was overtaken by Sasashima-raibu Station on the Aonami Line and Komeno Station on the Kintetsu Nagoya Line.

== Economy ==
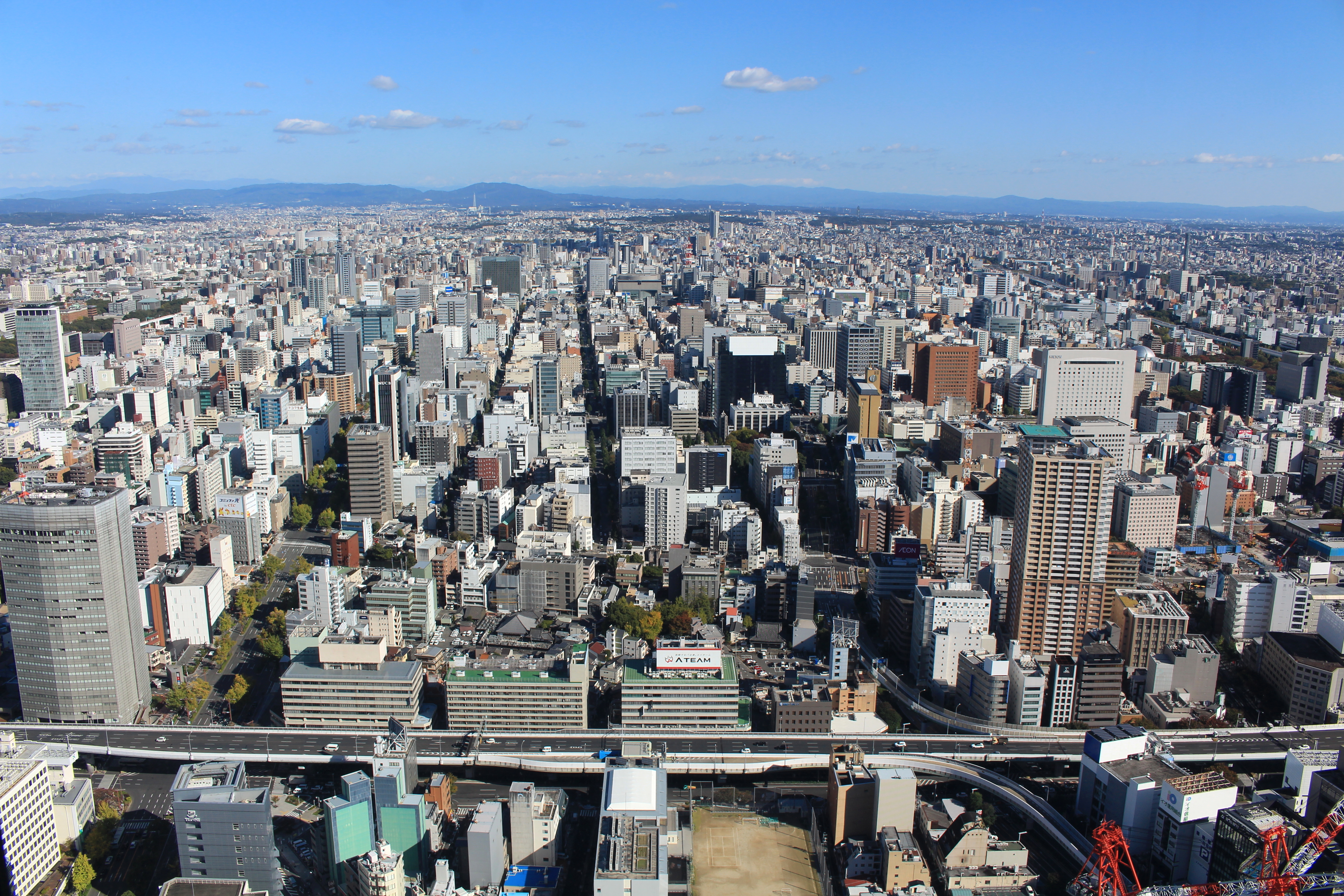
Chūkyō Metropolitan Area

Gross domestic product (2018) is the second largest in Japan, the shipment value of manufactured goods (2018) is the first in Japan, annual product sales (2019) is the third largest in Japan, and its agricultural output (2018) is eighth in Japan. Aichi's agriculture industry and commerce are all ranked high in Japan, and the industrial structure is well-balanced.

Main industry

- Aerospace Industry
- Automotive industry
- Ceramics Industry
- Steel, Alloy steel Industry

Companies headquartered in Aichi include the following.

Aichi Steel	Tōkai
Aisin Seiki	Kariya
Brother Industries, Ltd.	Nagoya
Central Japan Railway Company	Nagoya
Denso Corporation	Kariya
Eisaku Noro Company	Ichinomiya
Kanesue Corporation	Ichinomiya
Makita Corporation	Anjō
Matsuzakaya	Nagoya
Mizkan Corporation	Handa
Nagoya Railroad	Nagoya
Nippon Sharyo	Nagoya
Noritake	Nagoya
Okuma Corporation	Ōguchi
Sumitomo Riko	Komaki
Toyota Motor Corporation	Toyota

Companies such as Fuji Heavy Industries, Mitsubishi Motors, Pfizer, Sony, Suzuki, Bodycote, and Volkswagen Group also operate plants or branch offices in Aichi.

== International relations ==
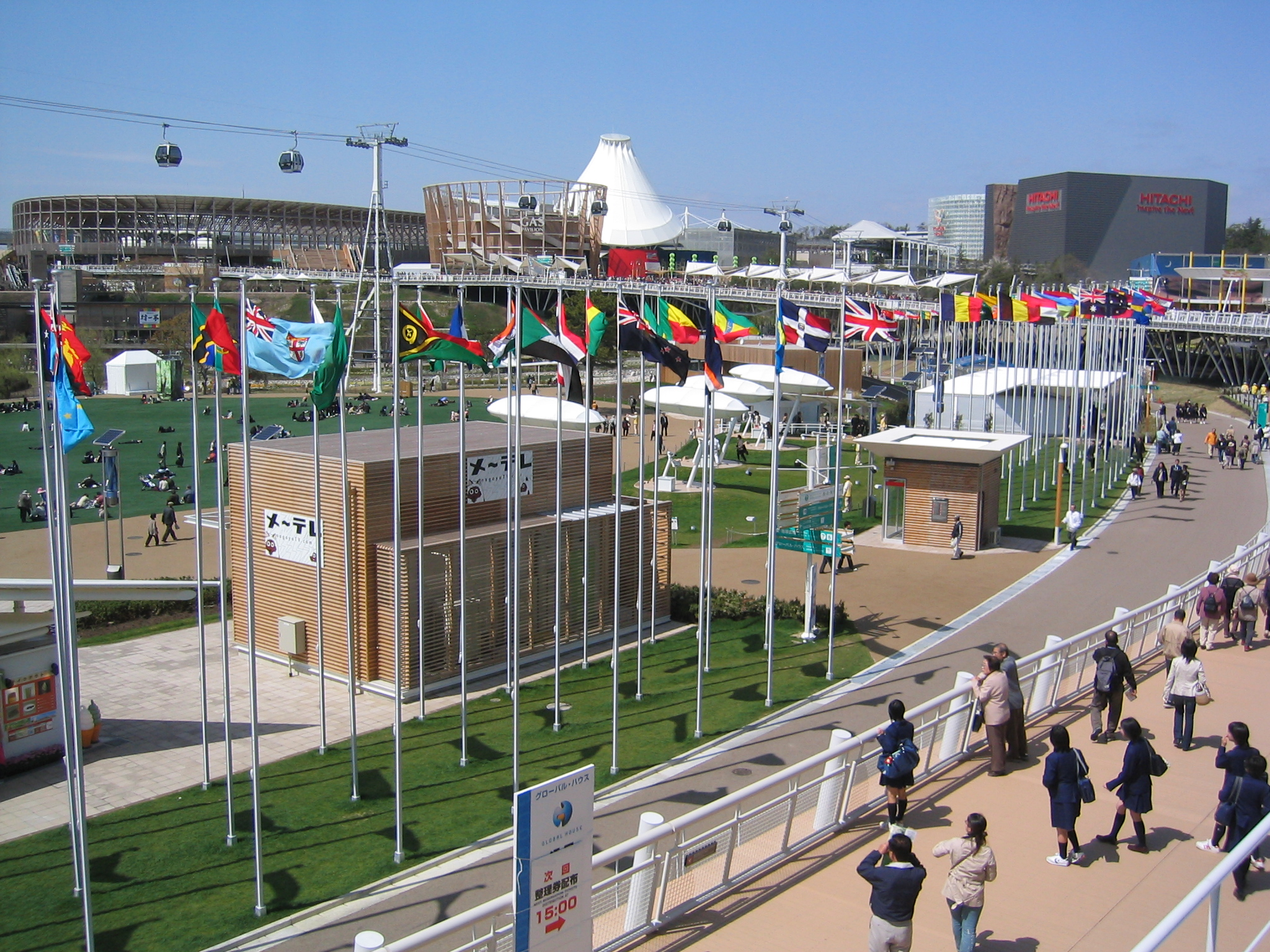
Expo 2005

=== Sister regions ===
- Victoria, Australia – May 2, 1980
- Jiangsu, China – July 28, 1980
- Bangkok, Thailand – July 9, 2012
- Guangdong, China – November 25, 2013
- Gyeonggi Province, South Korea – November 10, 2015
- Texas, United States – April 22, 2016
- Ho Chi Minh City, Vietnam – September 13, 2016
- Washington, United States – October 18, 2016
- Brussels, Flemish Region, Wallonia, Belgium – May 15, 2017
- Indiana, United States – September 15, 2017
- Kentucky, United States – October 23, 2017
- Occitanie, France – June 5, 2018
- São Paulo, Brazil – September 10, 2018

== Transport ==
=== Rail ===
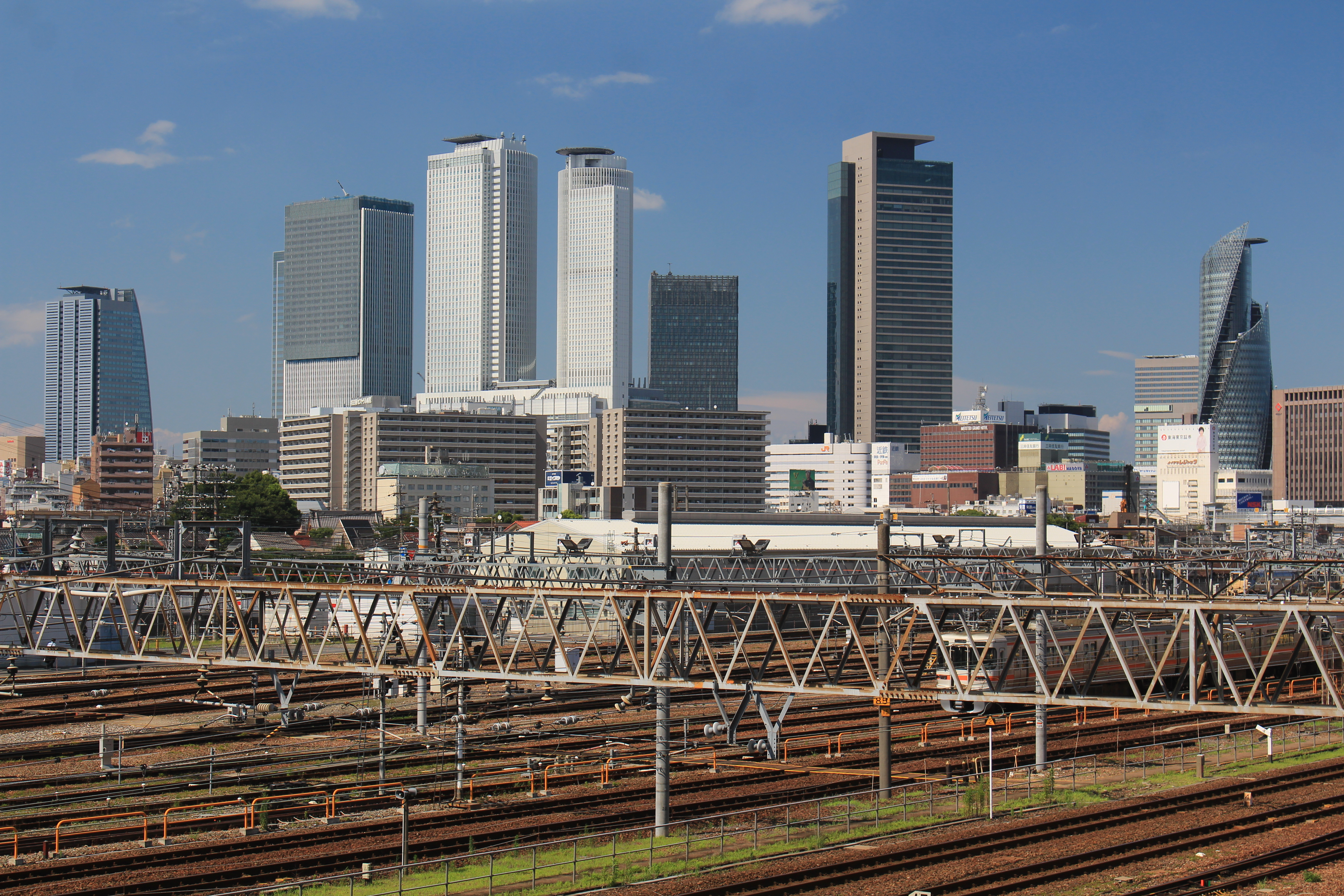
Nagoya Station and Nagoya Station building

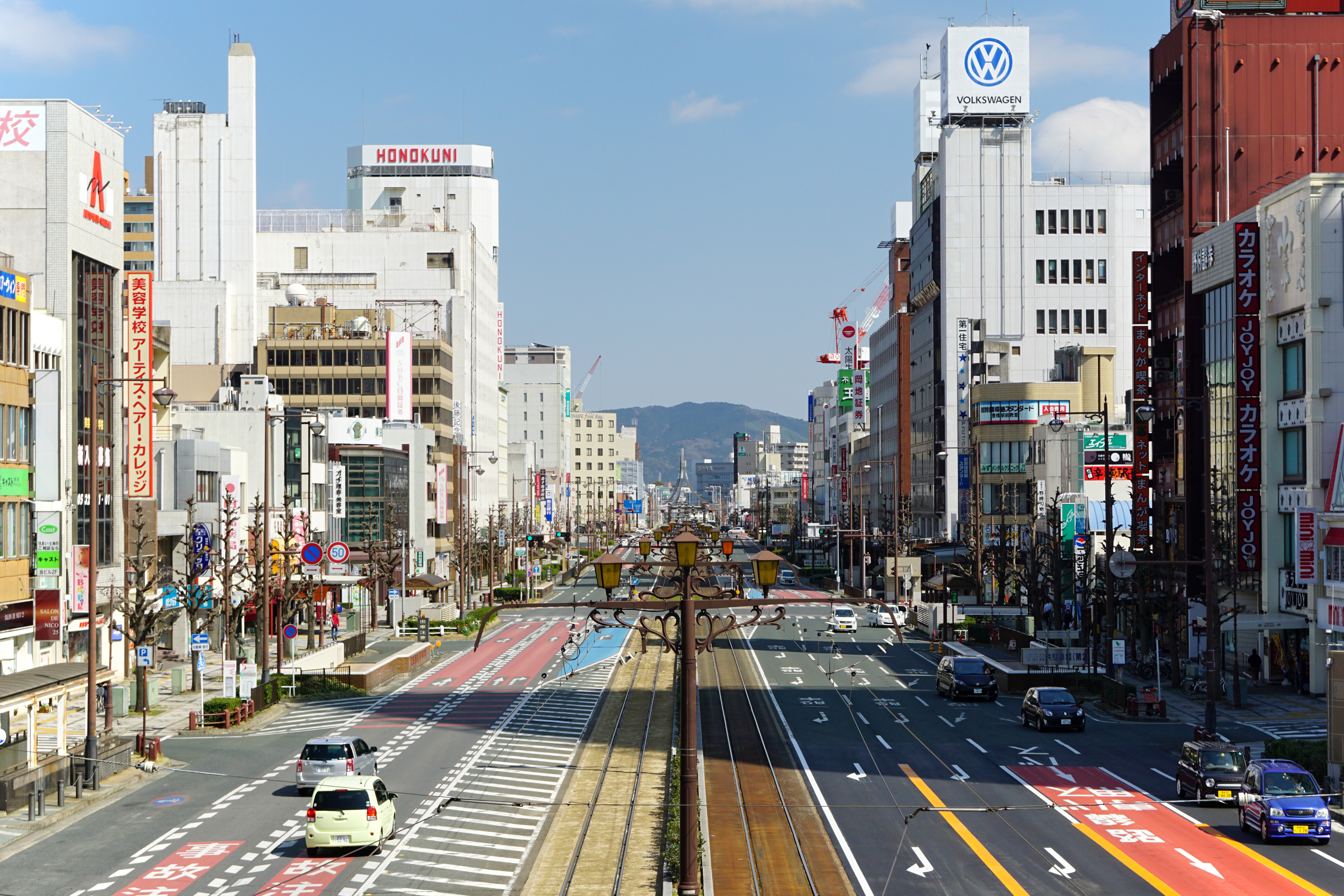
Toyohashi Station and Toyohashi Railroad

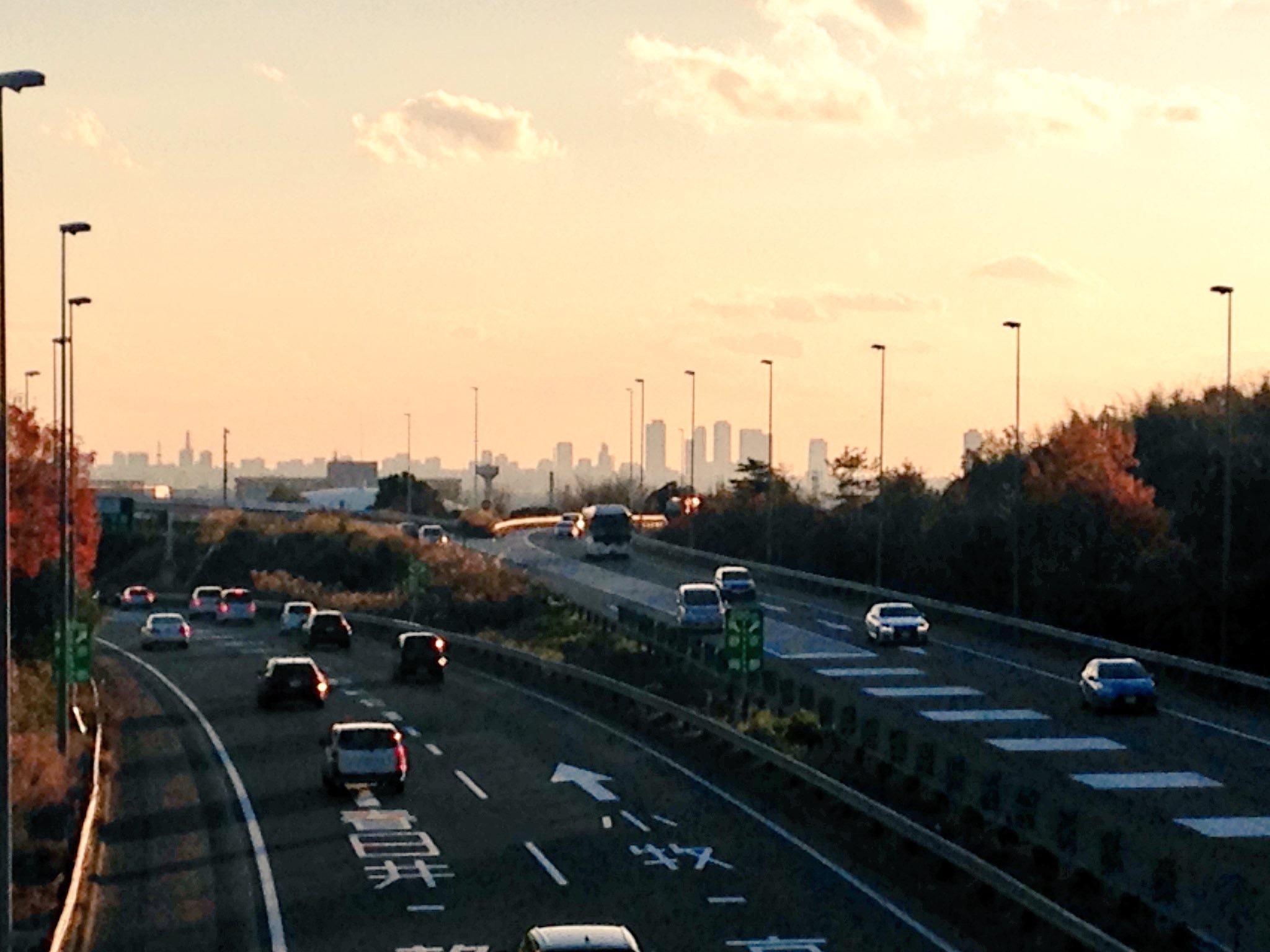
Komaki Junction

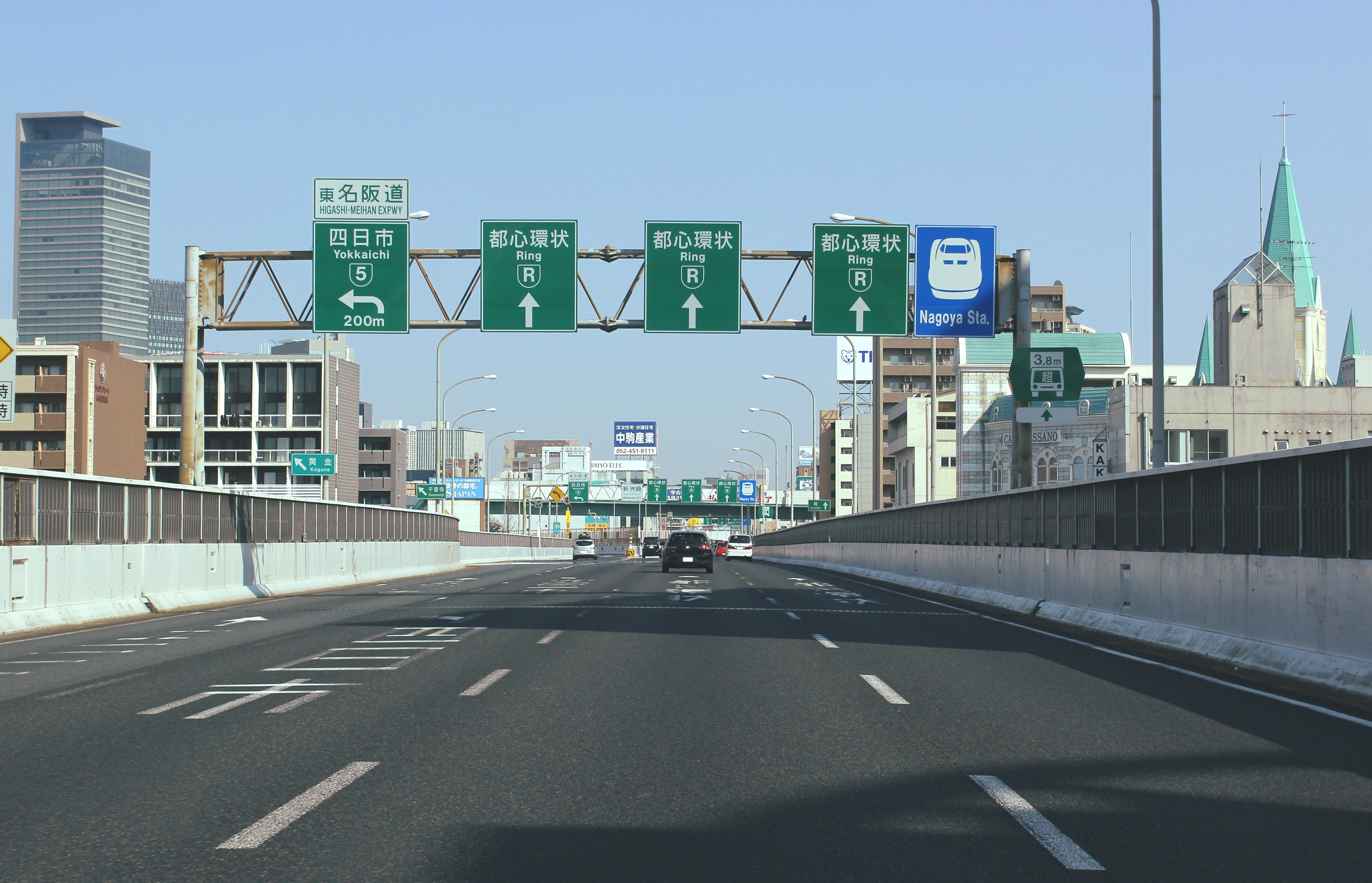
Nagoya Expressway

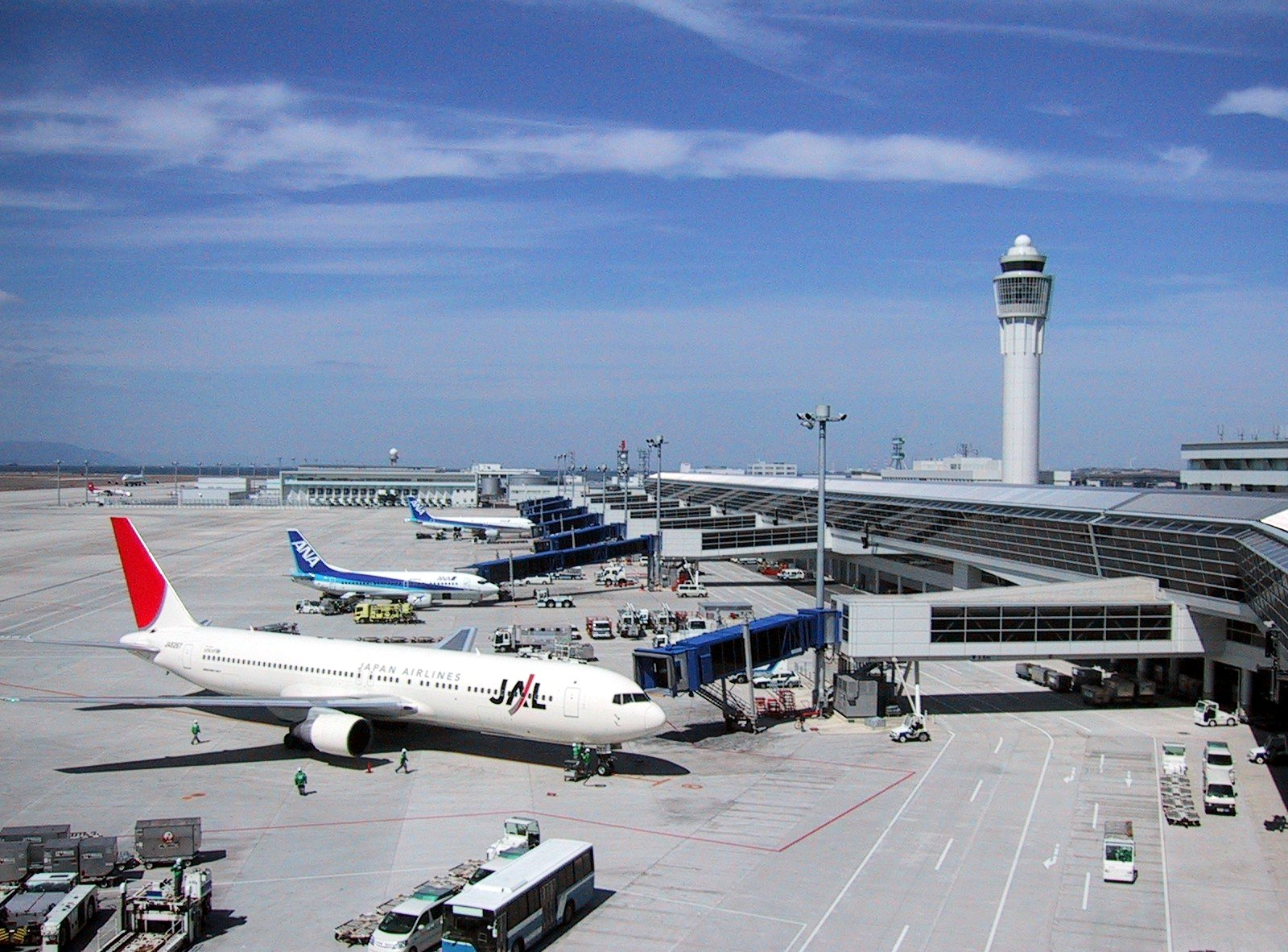
Chubu Centrair International Airport, constructed on an artificial island

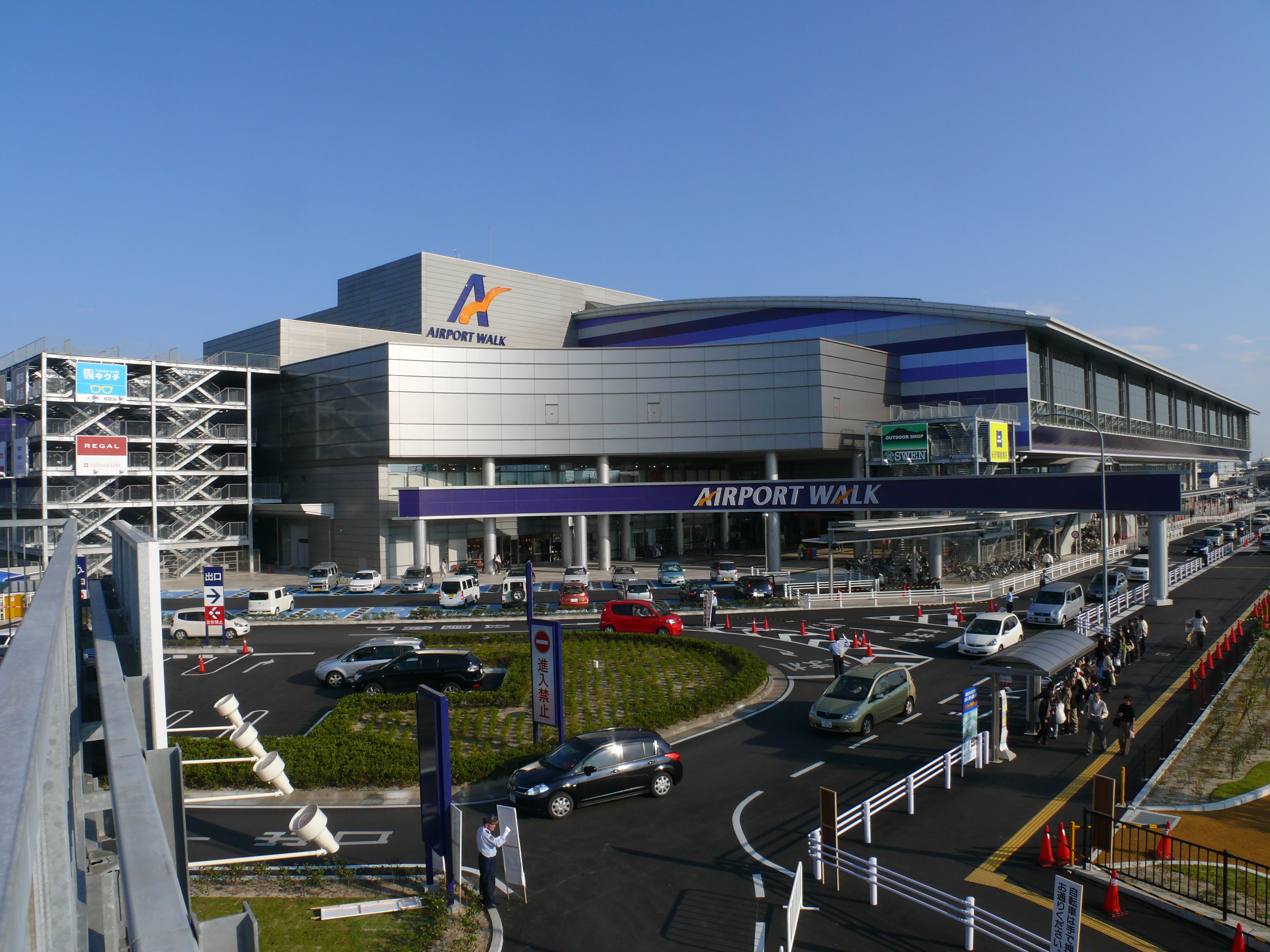
Nagoya Airfield

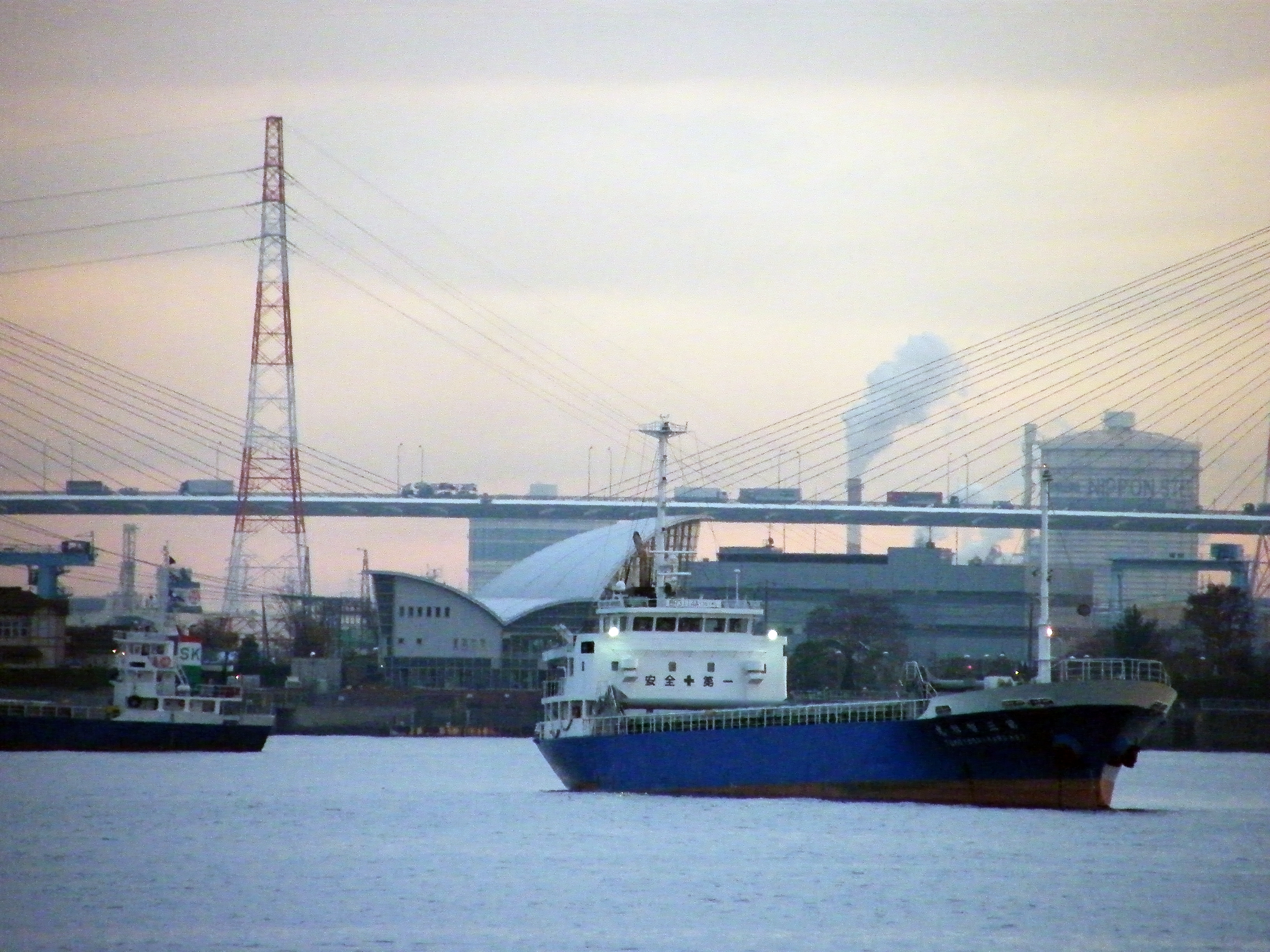
Port of Nagoya

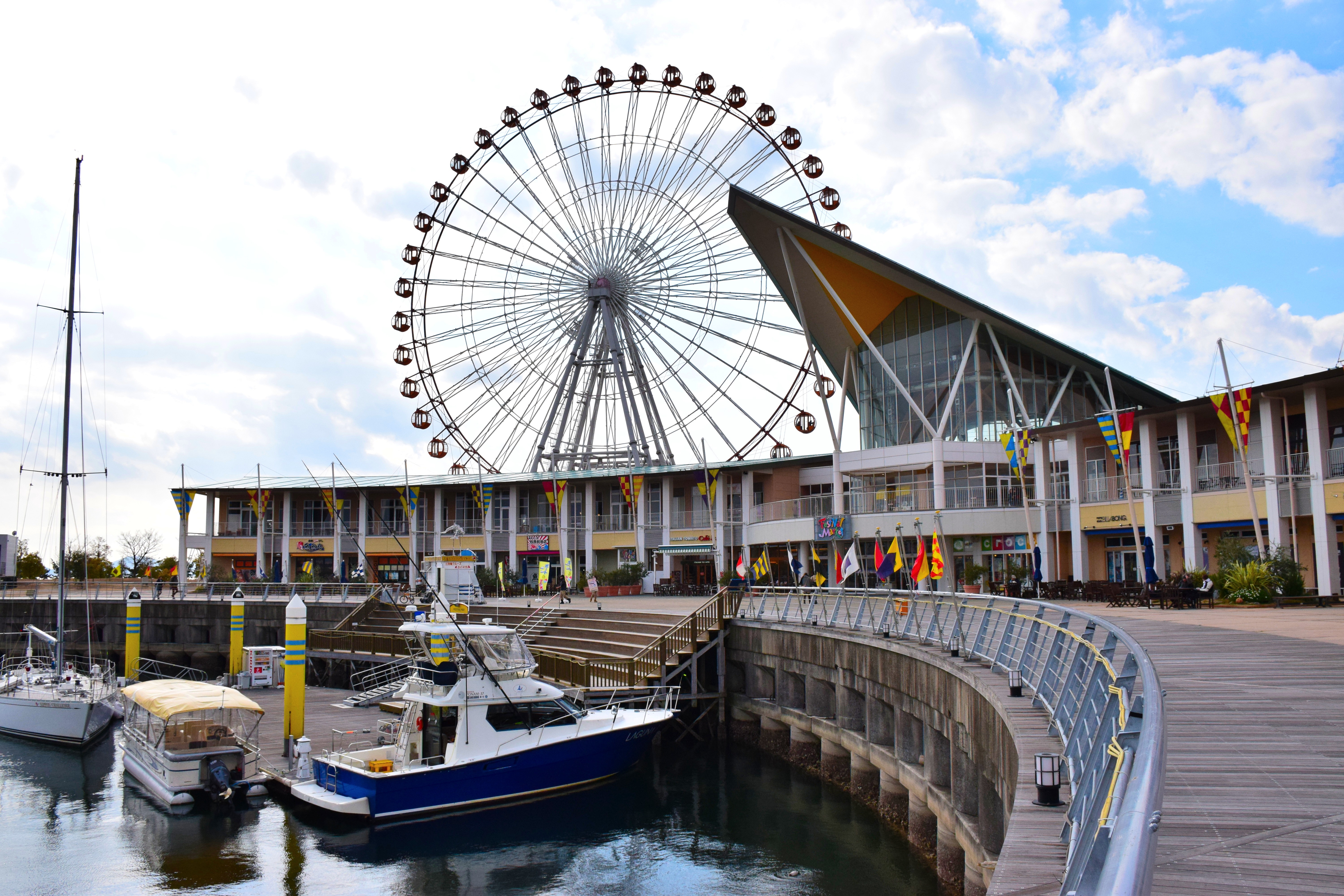
Port of Mikawa

JR Central
Tokaido Shinkansen
■Tokaido Line
■Chūō Main Line
■Kansai Line
■Taketoyo Line
■Iida Line
Meitetsu
NH Nagoya Line
IY Inuyama Line
KM Komaki Line
TA Centrair Line
TA Tokoname Line
ST Seto Line
TK Toyokawa Line
GN Gamagori Line
TT Toyota Line
KC Chita Line
MU MY Mikawa Line
TB Bisai Line
CH Chikko Line
TB Tsushima Line
Kintetsu
E Nagoya Line
Aonami Line
Nagoya Municipal Subway
Higashiyama Line
Meijo Line
Tsurumai Line (connecting to Meitetsu Toyota and Inuyama Line)
Sakura-dori Line
Meiko Line
Kamiiida Line (connecting to Meitetsu Komaki Line)
Toyohashi Railroad
Aichi Loop Line

=== People movers and tramways ===
- Linimo
- Nagoya Guideway Bus
- Toyohashi Railroad

=== Road ===
Expressways and toll roads

- Chita across Road
- Chita Peninsula Road
- Chubu International Airport Connecting Road
- Chuo Expressway
- Higashi-Meihan Expressway (East Meihan Expressway)
- Isewangan Expressway (Ise Bayside Expressway)
- Meishin Expressway
- Mei-Nikan Expressway
- Nagoya Expressway
- Nagoya Seto Road
- Shin-Meishin Expressway
- Shin-Tōmei Expressway
- South Chita Road
- Tokai-Hokuriku Expressway
- Tomei Expressway

National highways

- Route 1
- Route 19 (Nagoya-Kasugai-Tajimi-Nagiso-Matsumoto-Nagano)
- Route 22 (Nagoya-Ichinomiya-Gifu)
- Route 23 (Ise-Matsuzaka-Suzuka-Yokkaichi-Nagoya-Toyoake-Chiryu-Gamagori-Toyohashi)
- Route 41 (Nagoya-Komaki-Inuyama-Gero-Takayama-Toyama)
- Route 42
- Route 151
- Route 153
- Route 154
- Route 155 (Tokoname-Chita-Kariya-Toyota-Seto-Kasugai-Komaki-Ichinomiya-Tsushima-Yatomi)
- Route 247
- Route 248
- Route 257 (Hamamatsu-Shinshiro-Toyota-Ena-Nakatsugawa-Gero-Takayama)
- Route 259
- Route 301
- Route 302
- Route 362
- Route 363
- Route 366
- Route 419
- Route 420
- Route 473 (Gamagori-Okazaki-Toyota-Shitara-Hamamatsu)
- Route 474
- Route 475

=== Airports ===
- Chubu Centrair International Airport
- Nagoya Airfield

=== Ports ===
- Kinuura Port – Handa and Hekinan
- Mikawa Port – mainly automobile and car parts export and part of inport base
- Nagoya Port – International Container hub and ferry route to Sendai and Tomakomai, Hokkaido

== Education ==
=== Universities ===
National universities

- Aichi University of Education
- Graduate University for Advanced Studies – Okazaki Campus (National Institute for Basic Biology, Japan, National Institute for Physiological Sciences, Japan)
- Nagoya Institute of Technology
- Nagoya University
- Toyohashi University of Technology
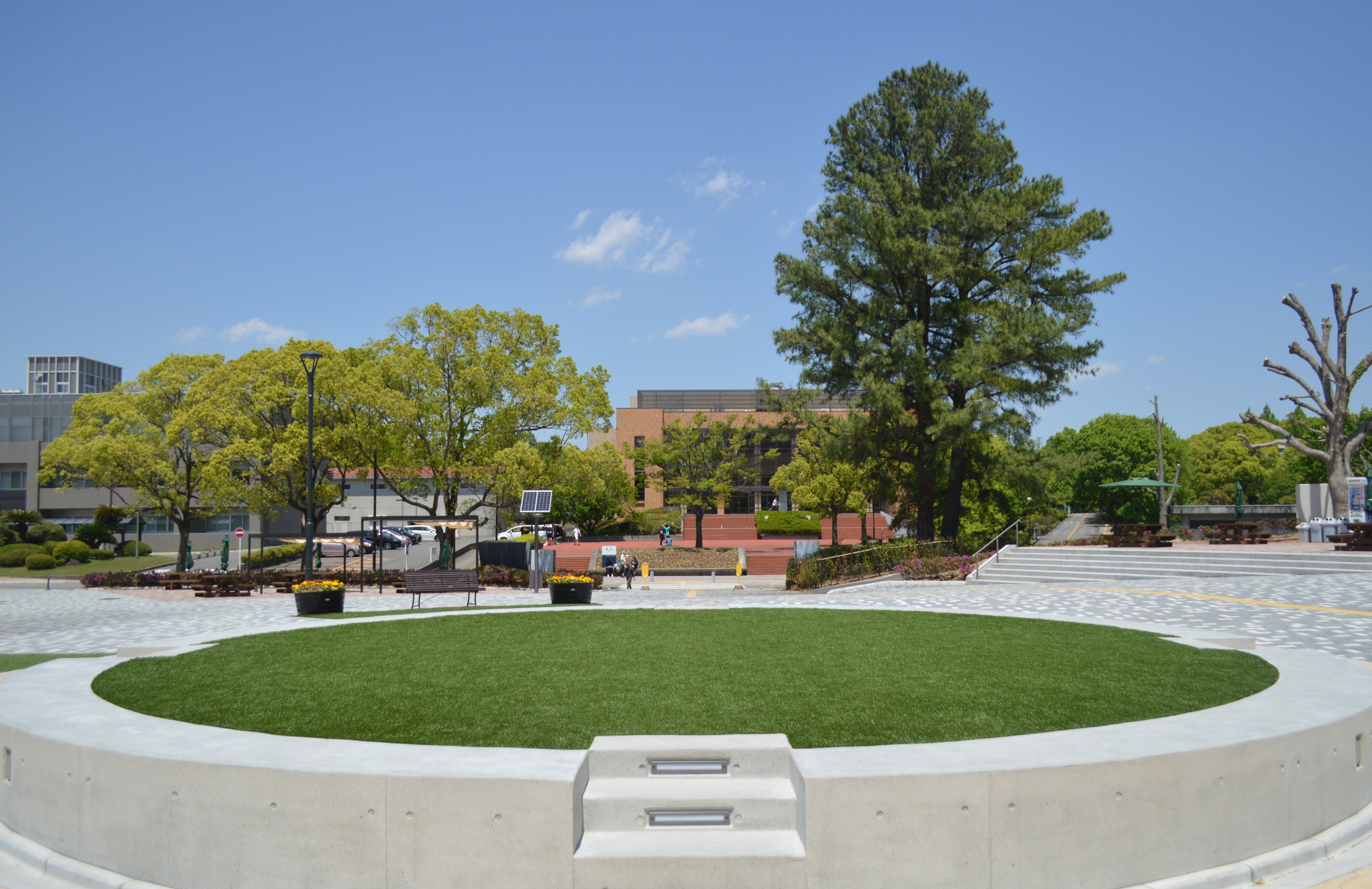
Aichi University of Education

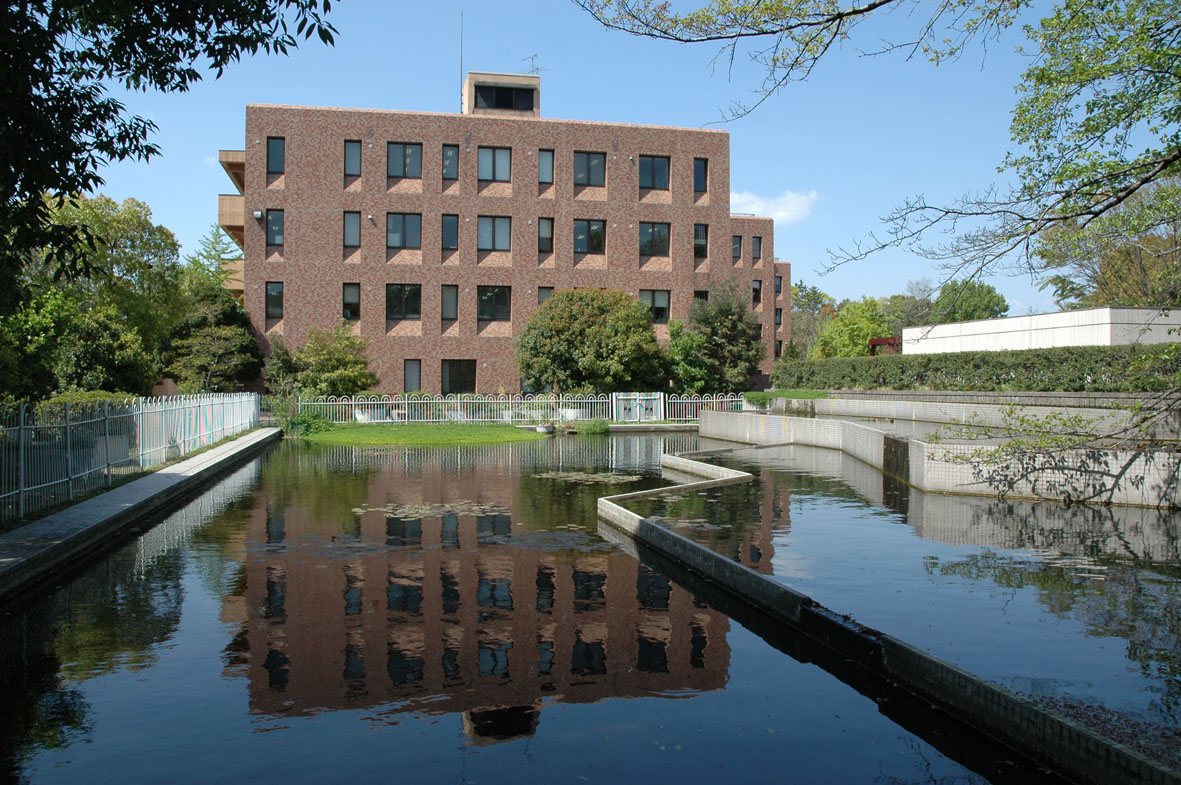
Graduate University for Advanced Studies

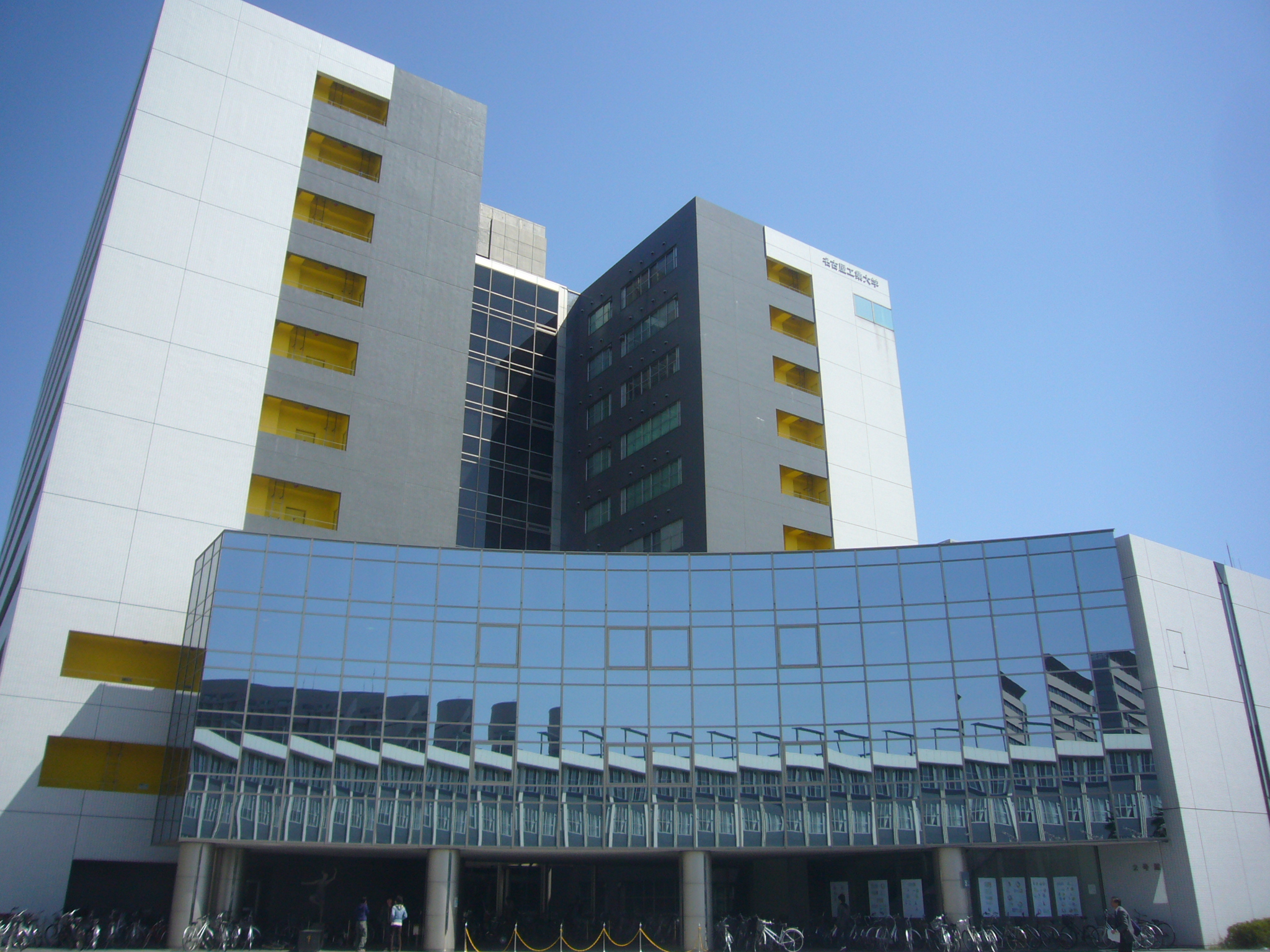
Nagoya Institute of Technology

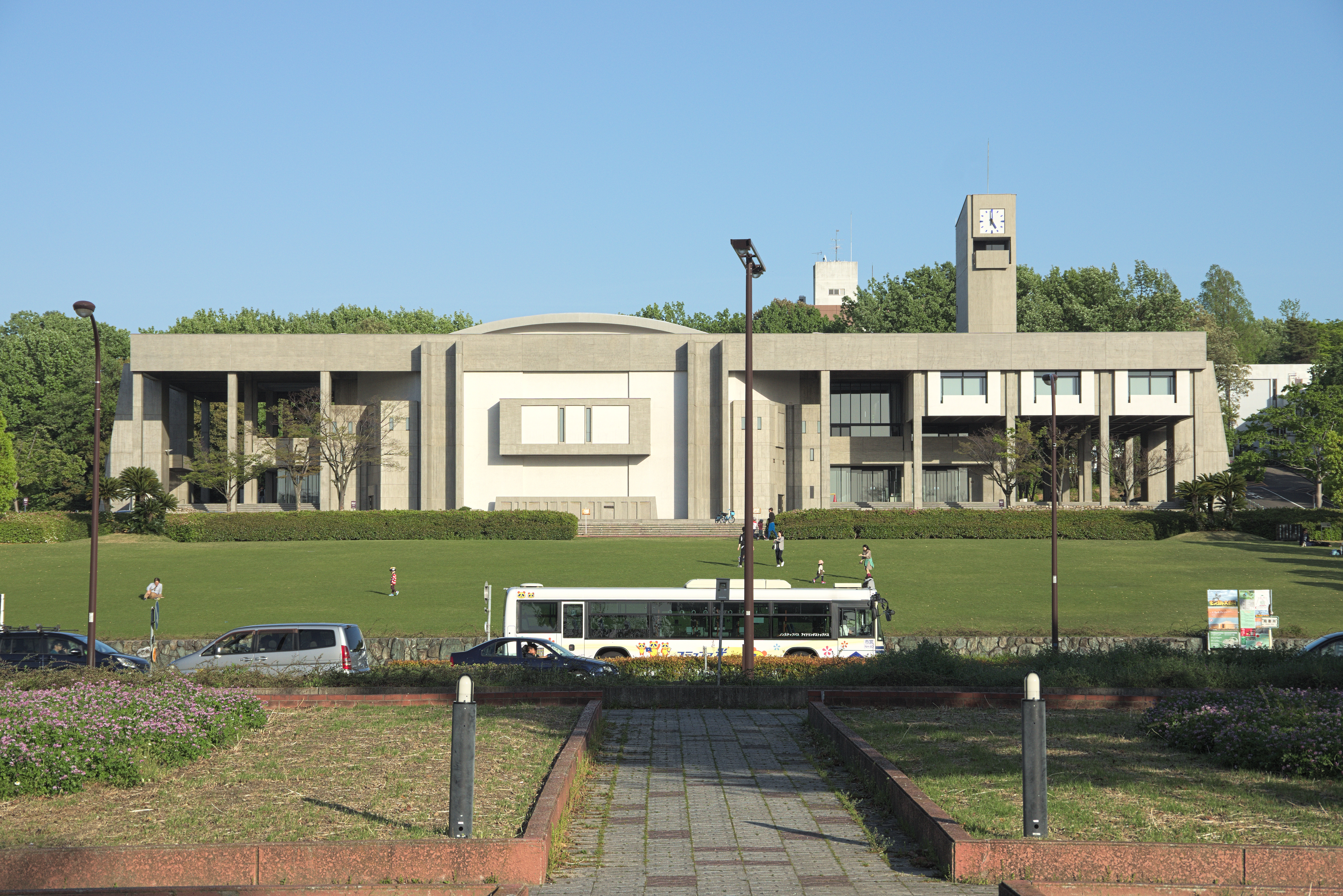
Nagoya University

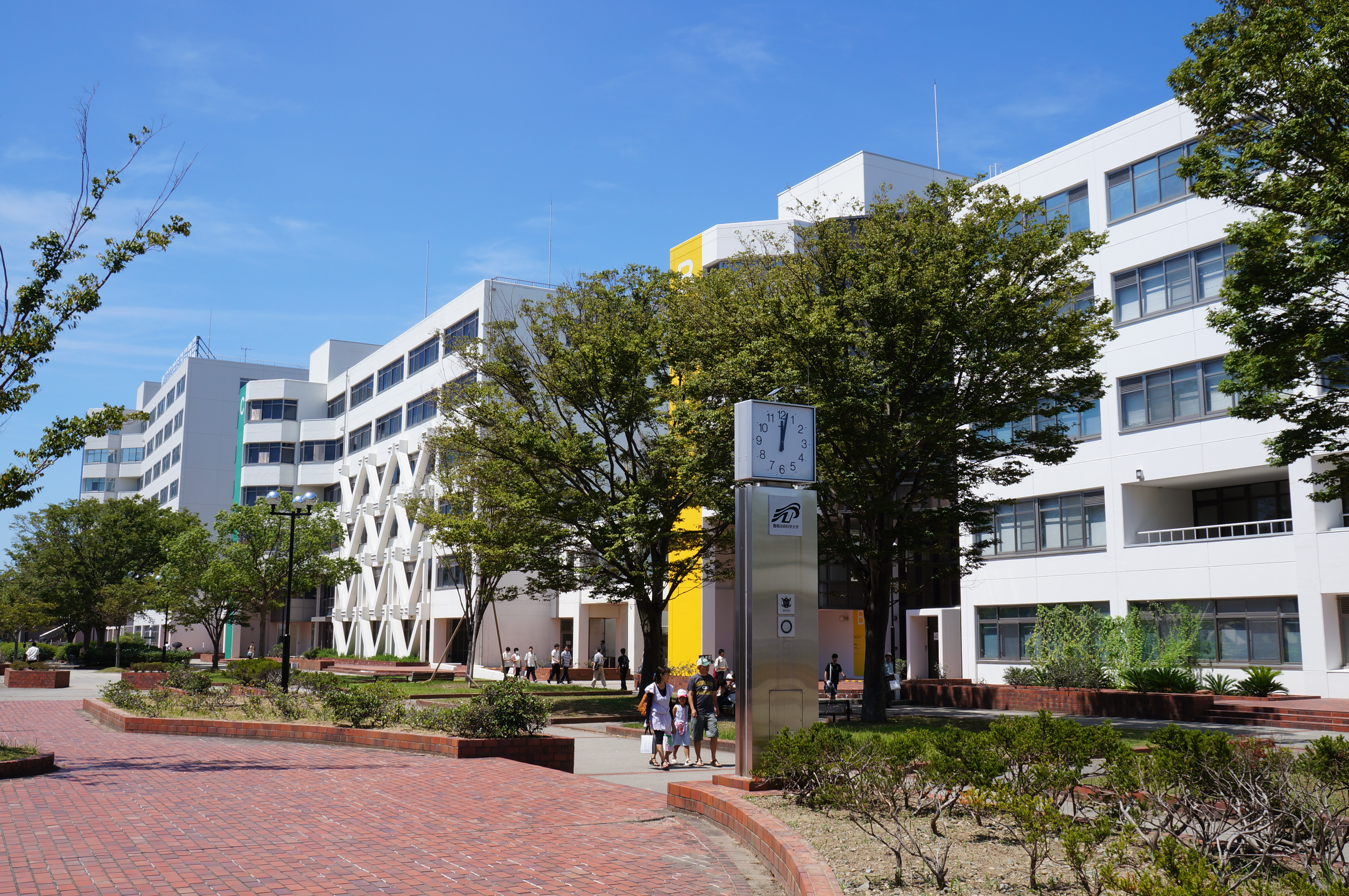
Toyohashi University of Technology

Public universities

- Aichi Prefectural University
- Aichi Prefectural University of the Arts
- Nagoya City University
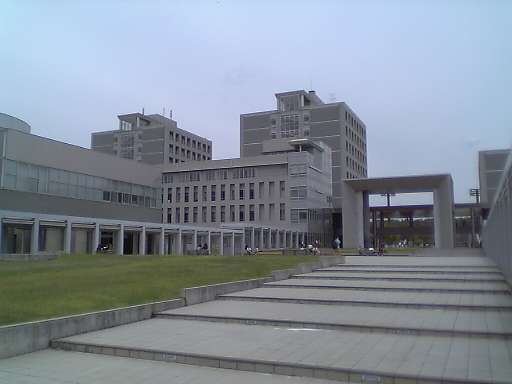
Aichi Prefectural University

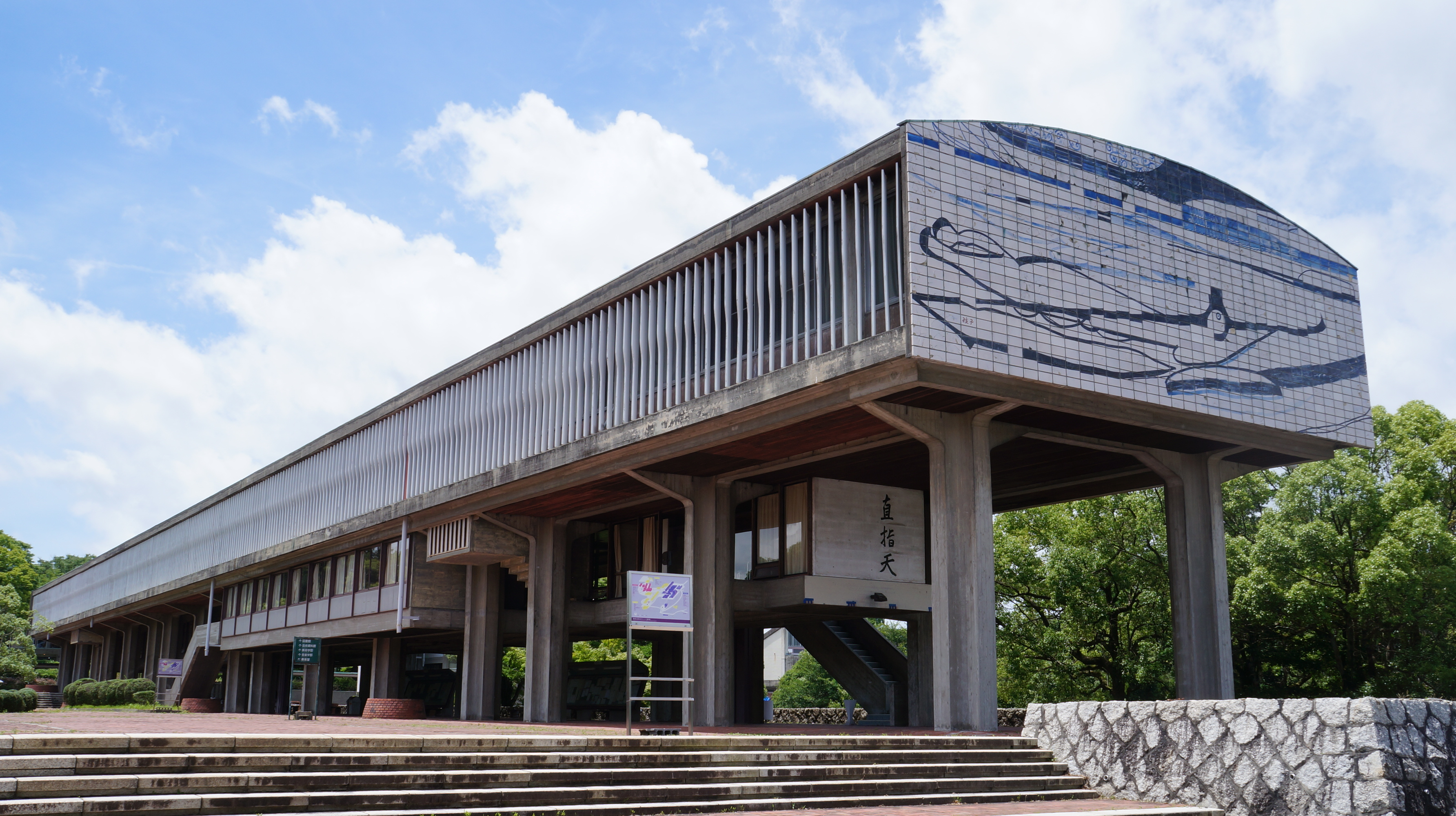
Aichi Prefectural University of the Arts

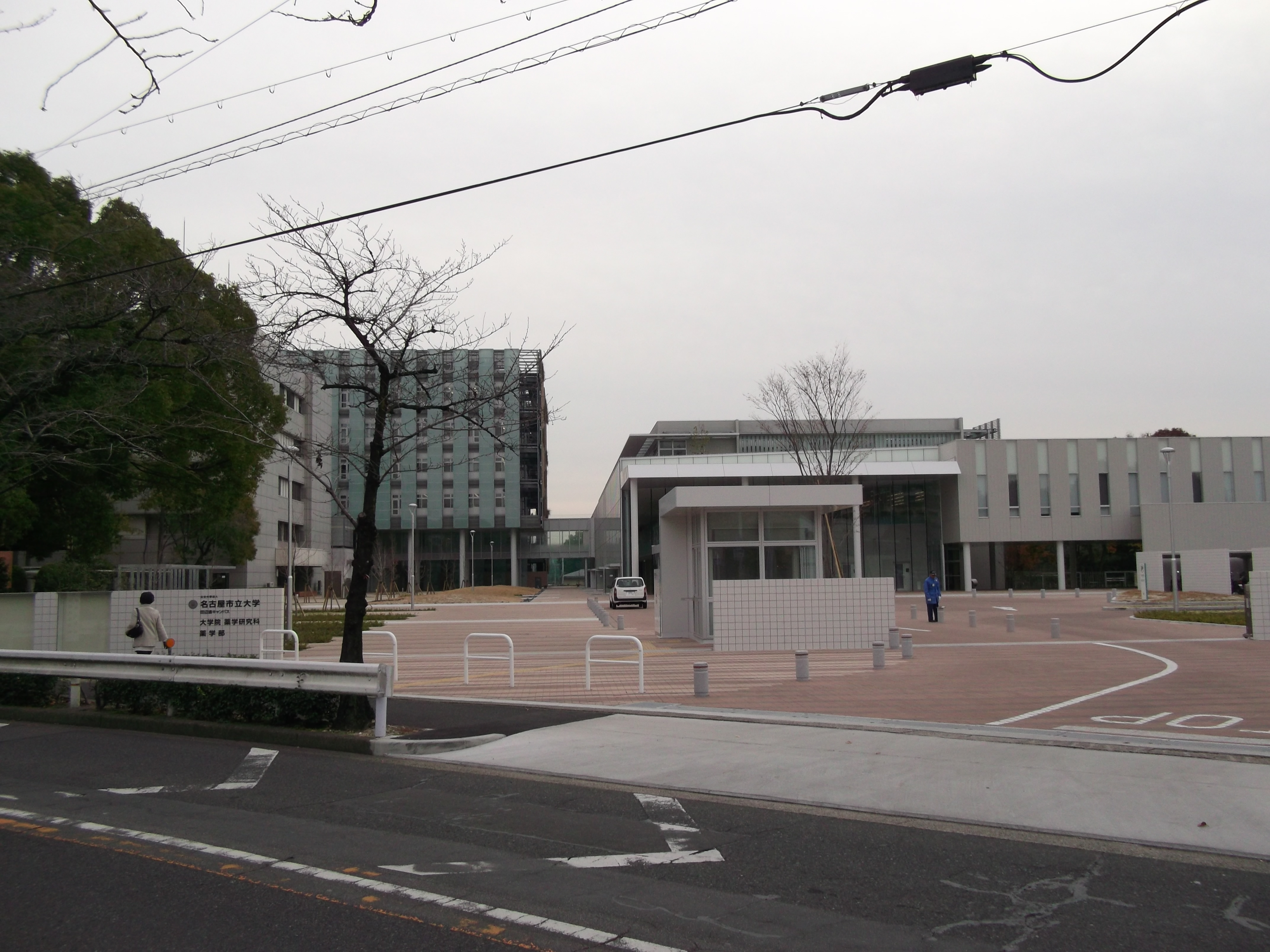
Nagoya City University

Private universities

- Aichi Bunkyo University
- Aichi Gakuin University
- Aichi Gakusen University
- Aichi Institute of Technology
- Aichi Medical University
- Aichi Mizuho College
- Aichi Sangyo University
- Aichi Shukutoku University
- Aichi Toho University
- Aichi University
- Aichi University of Technology
- Chubu University
- Chukyo University
- Daido University
- Doho University
- Fujita Health University
- Globis University Graduate School of Management – Nagoya Campus
- Japanese Red Cross Toyota College of Nursing
- Kinjo Gakuin University
- Meijo University
- Nagoya Bunri University
- Nagoya College of Music
- Nagoya Gakuin University
- Nagoya Keizai University
- Nagoya Sangyo University
- Nagoya University of Arts
- Nagoya University of Arts and Sciences
- Nagoya University of Commerce & Business
- Nagoya University of Foreign Studies
- Nagoya Women's University
- Nagoya Zokei University
- Nanzan University
- Nihon Fukushi University
- Ohkagakuen University
- Okazaki Women's Junior College
- Seijoh University
- Seisa University – Nagoya Schooling Campus
- Shigakkan University
- Shubun University
- Sugiyama Jogakuen University
- Tokai Gakuen University
- Tokyo University of Social Welfare – Nagoya Campus
- Toyohashi Sozo College
- Toyota Technological Institute
- University of Human Environments
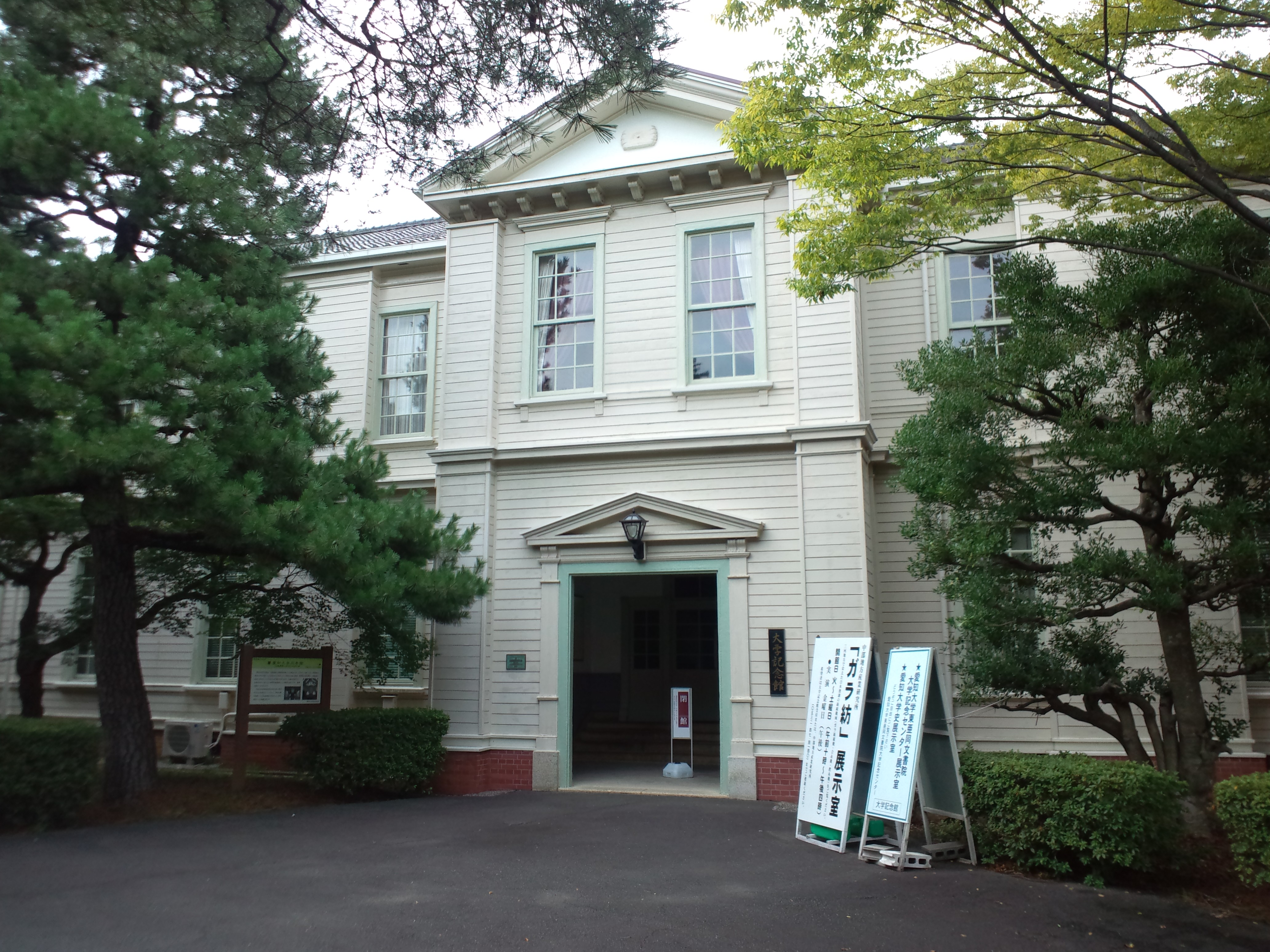
Aichi University

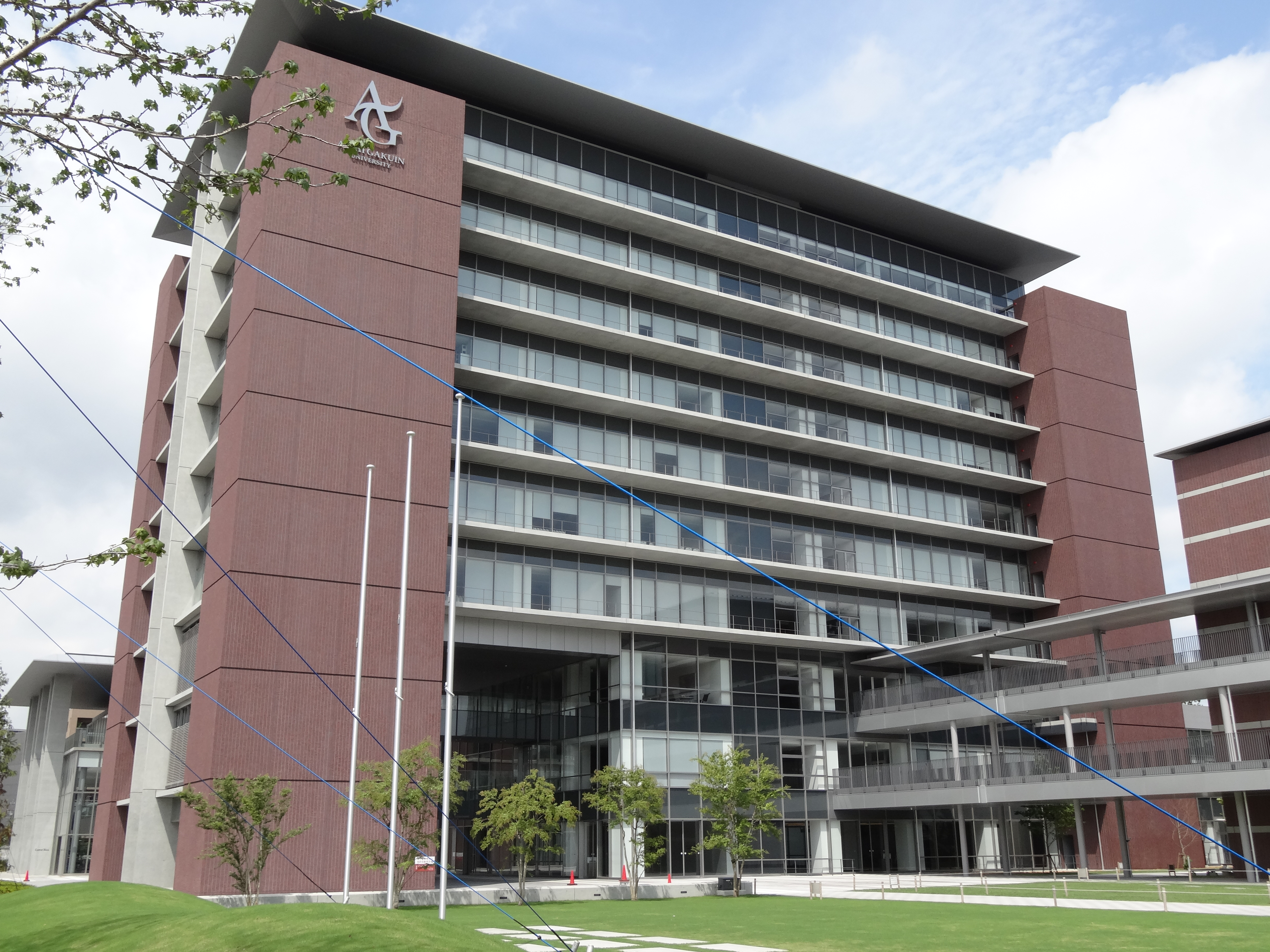
Aichi Gakuin University

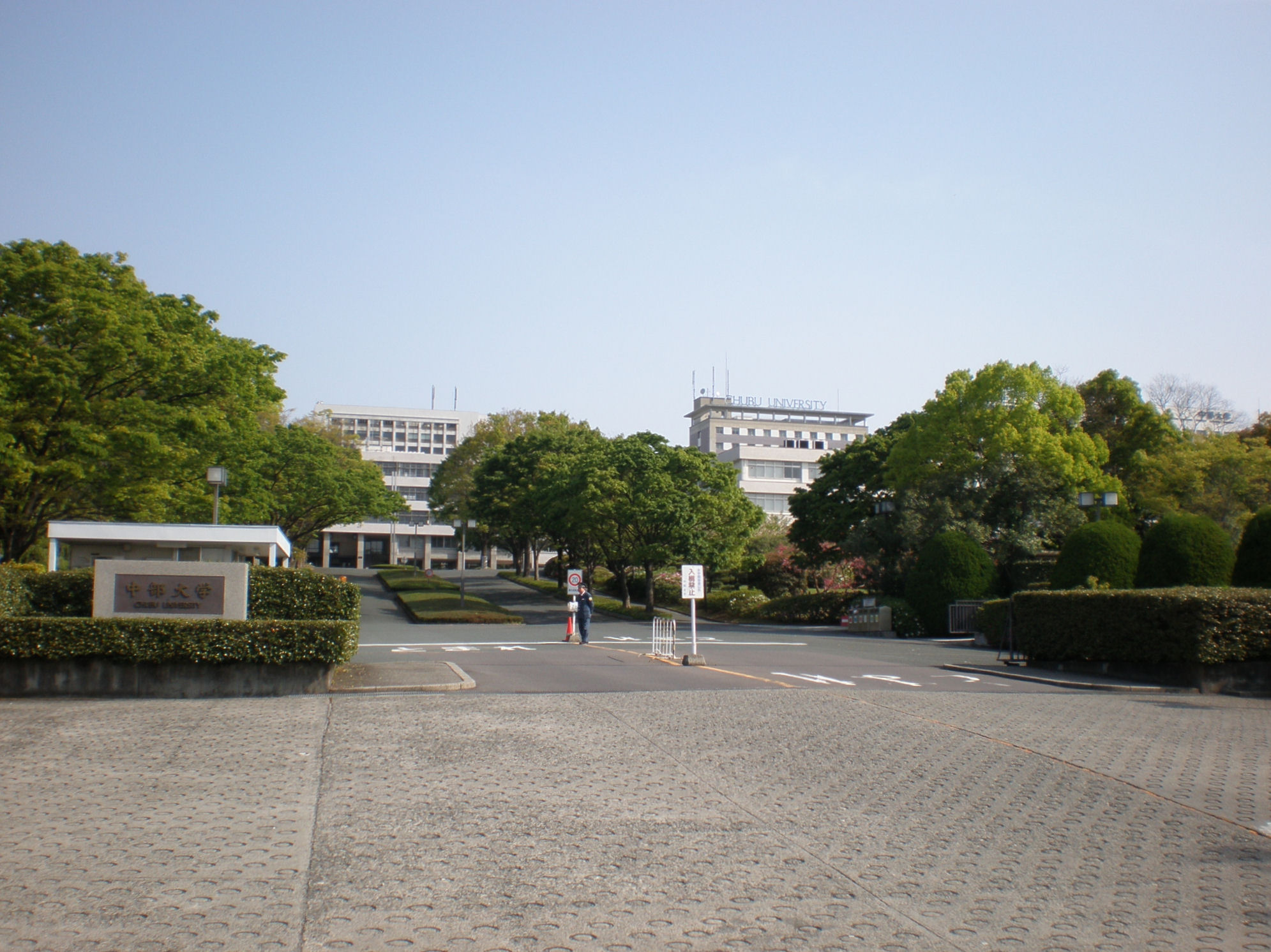
Chubu University

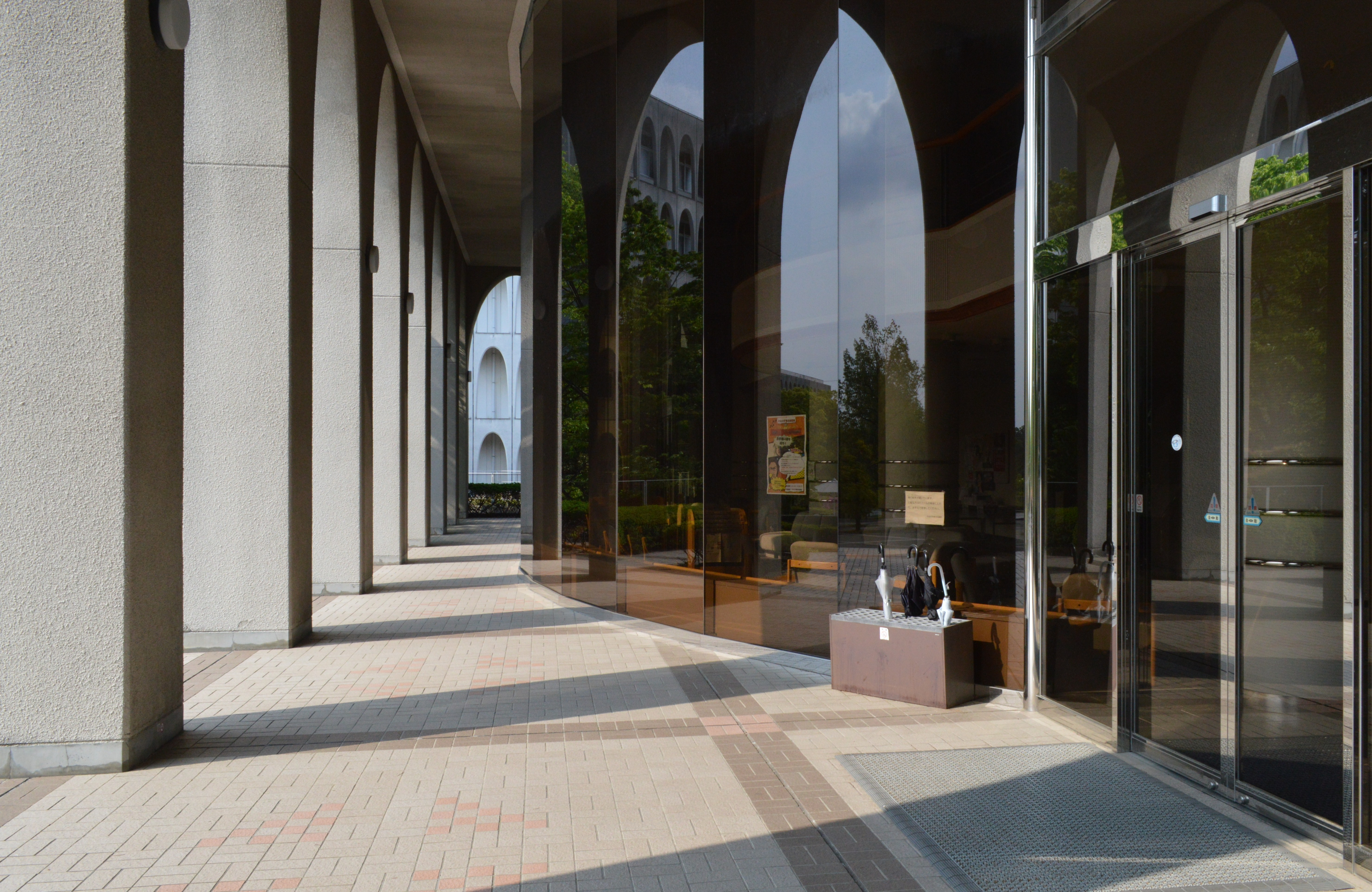
Chukyo University

Meijo University

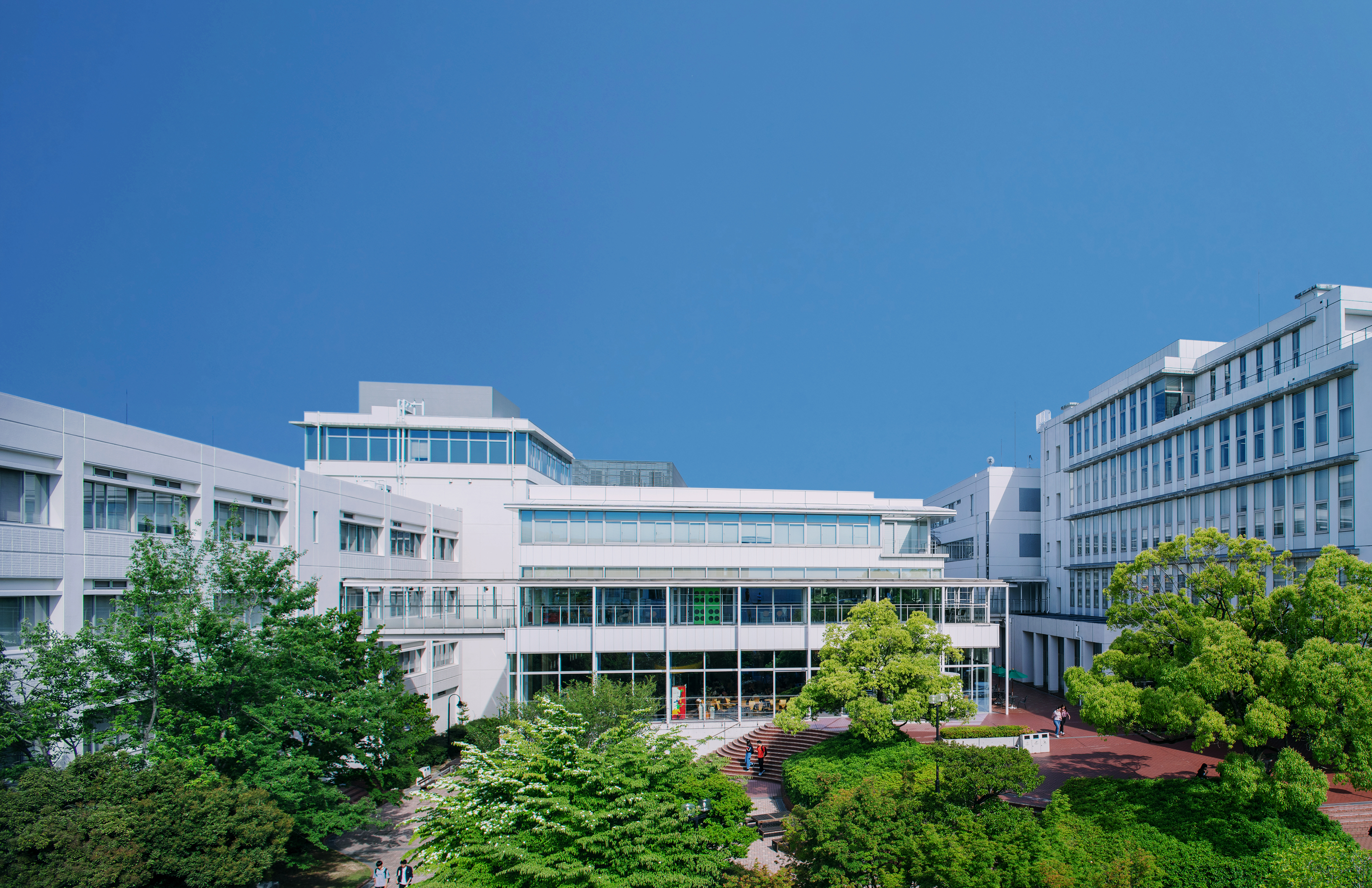
Nagoya University of Foreign Studies

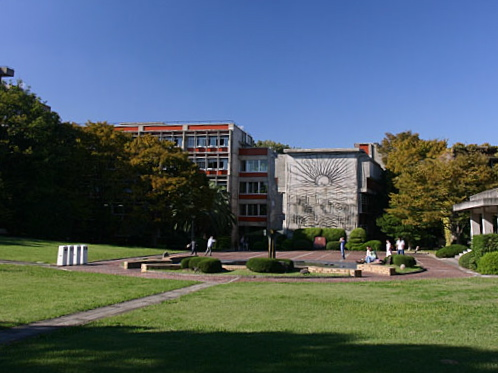
Nanzan University

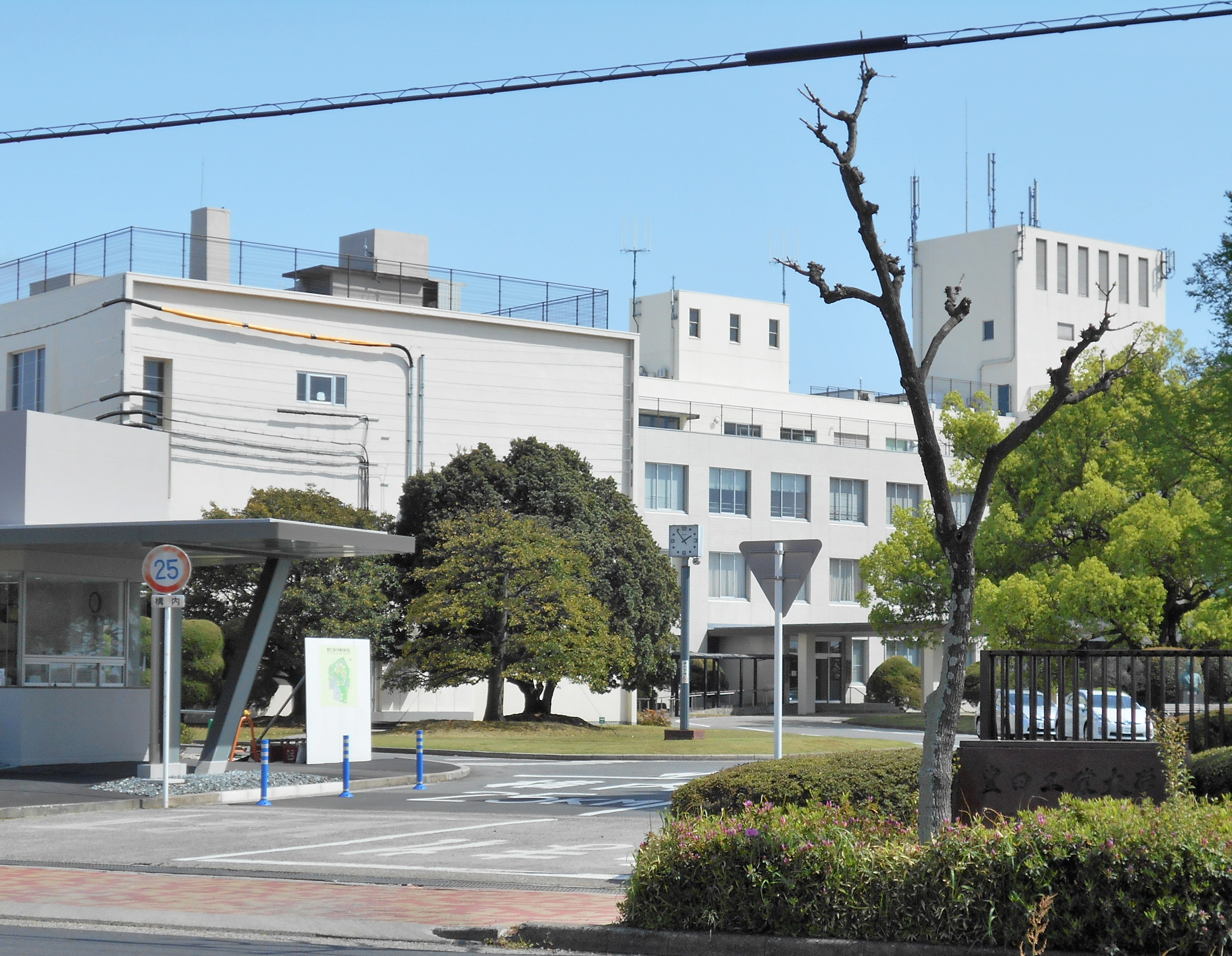
Toyota Technological Institute

== Sports ==
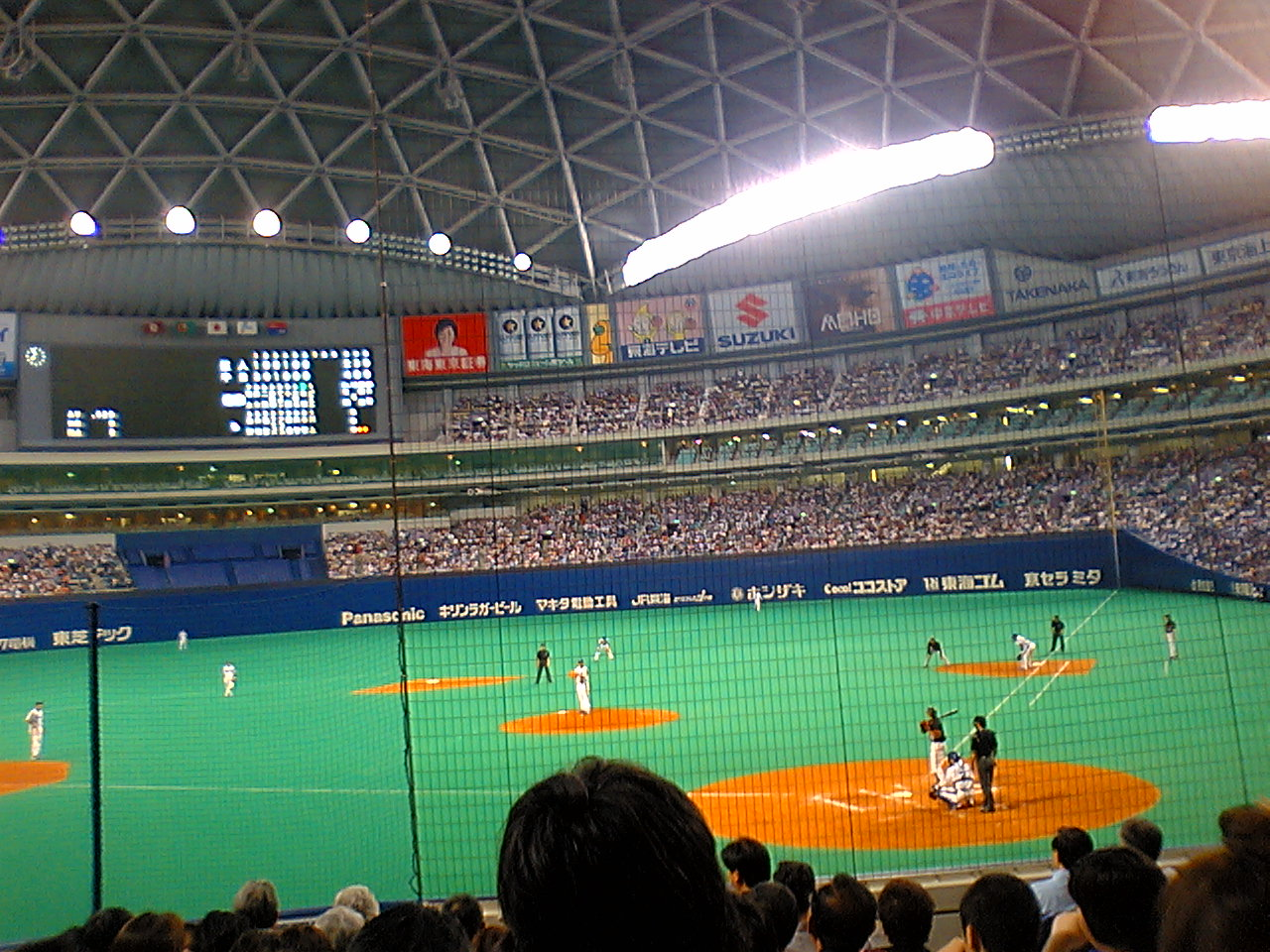
Nagoya Dome （Nagoya Higashi-ku）

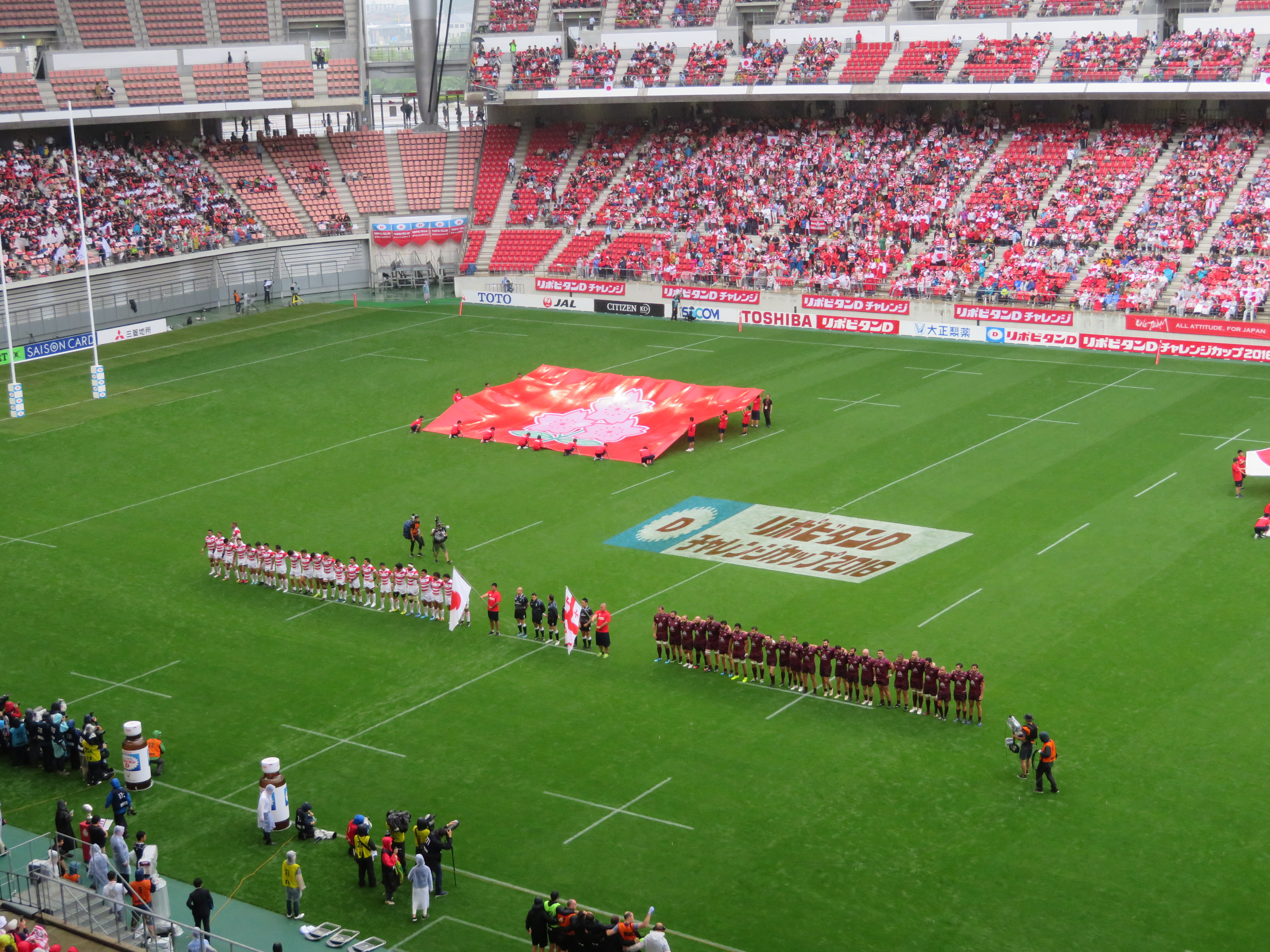
Toyota Stadium （Toyota）

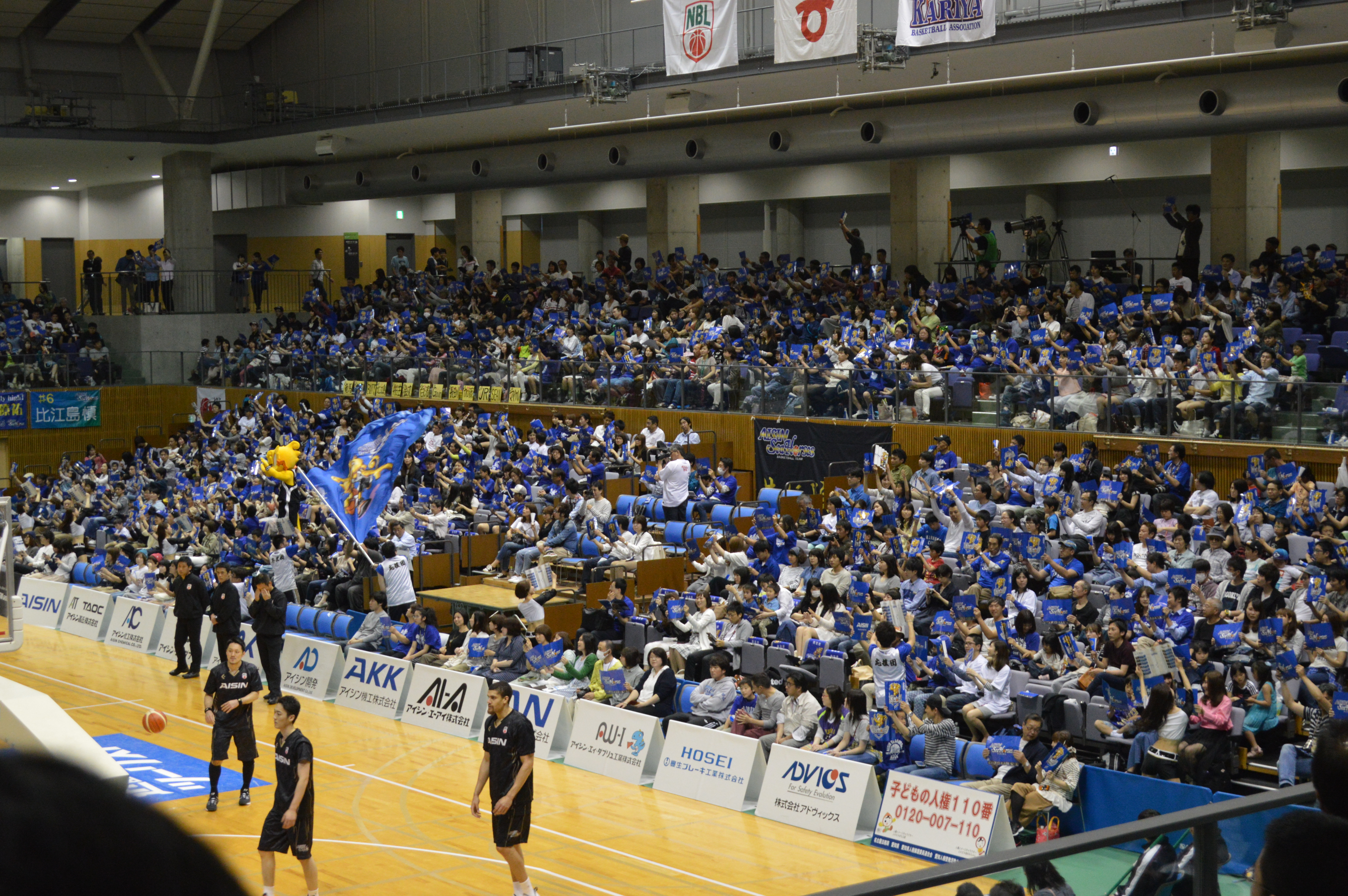
Wing Arena Kariya （Kariya）

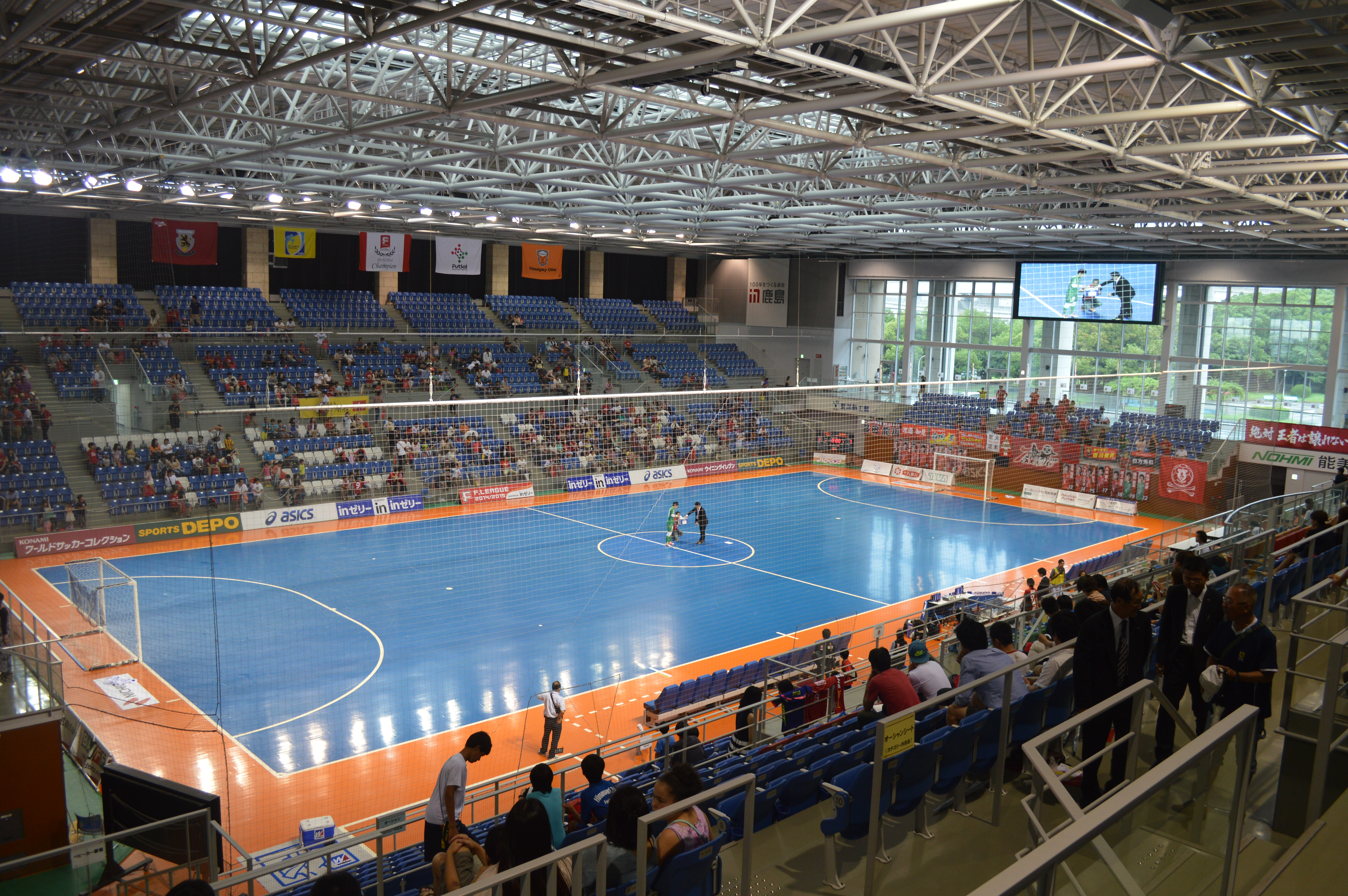
Teva Ocean Arena （Nagoya Minato-ku）

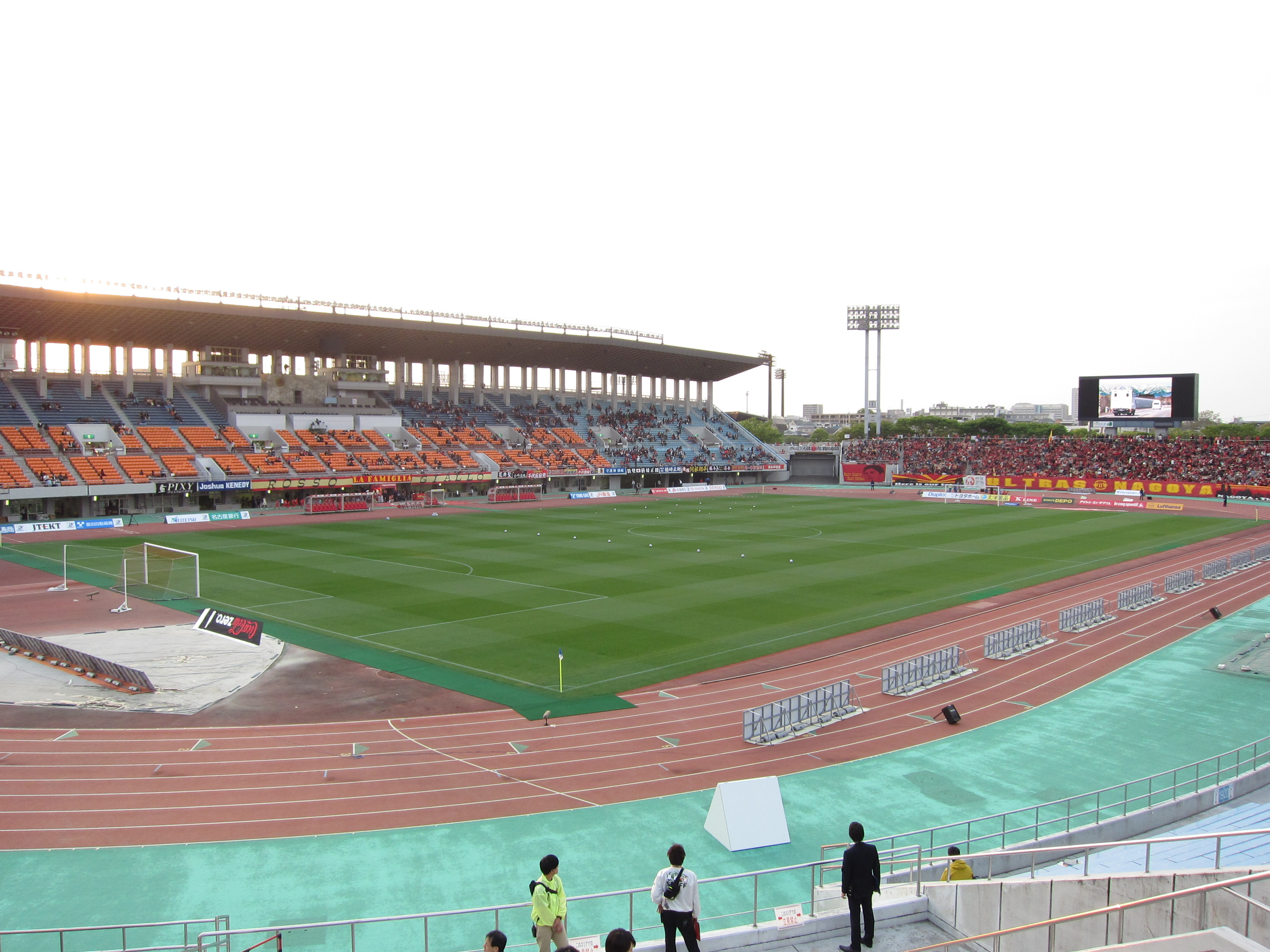
Paloma Mizuho Stadium （Nagoya Mizuho-ku）

The sports teams listed below are based in Aichi.

=== Baseball ===
Central League

- Chunichi Dragons (Nagoya)

=== Soccer ===
J.League

- Nagoya Grampus (Nagoya and Toyota)

JFL

- FC Maruyasu Okazaki (Okazaki)

Tokai Regional League

- FC Kariya (Kariya)

L.League

- NGU Loveledge Nagoya (Nagoya)

=== Basketball ===
B.League

- Aisin AW Areions Anjo (Anjō)
- Nagoya Diamond Dolphins (Nagoya)
- SAN-EN NeoPhoenix (Toyohashi and Hamamatsu)
- SeaHorses Mikawa (Kariya)
- Toyotsu Fighting Eagles Nagoya (Nagoya)

=== Volleyball ===
V.League

- Denso Airybees (Nishio)
- JTEKT Stings (Kariya)
- Toyoda Gosei Trefuerza (Inazawa)
- Toyota Auto Body Queenseis (Kariya)

=== Rugby ===
Japan Rugby League One

- Shuttles Aichi (Kariya)
- Toyota Verblitz (Toyota)

=== Futsal ===
F.League

- Nagoya Oceans (Nagoya)

=== Football ===
X-League

- Aichi Golden Wings (Nagoya and Toyota)
- Kirix Toyota Bull Fighters (Toyota)
- Nagoya Cyclones (Nagoya)

AFL

- Nagoya Redbacks Australian Football Club (AFL Japan) (Nagoya)

== Tourism ==
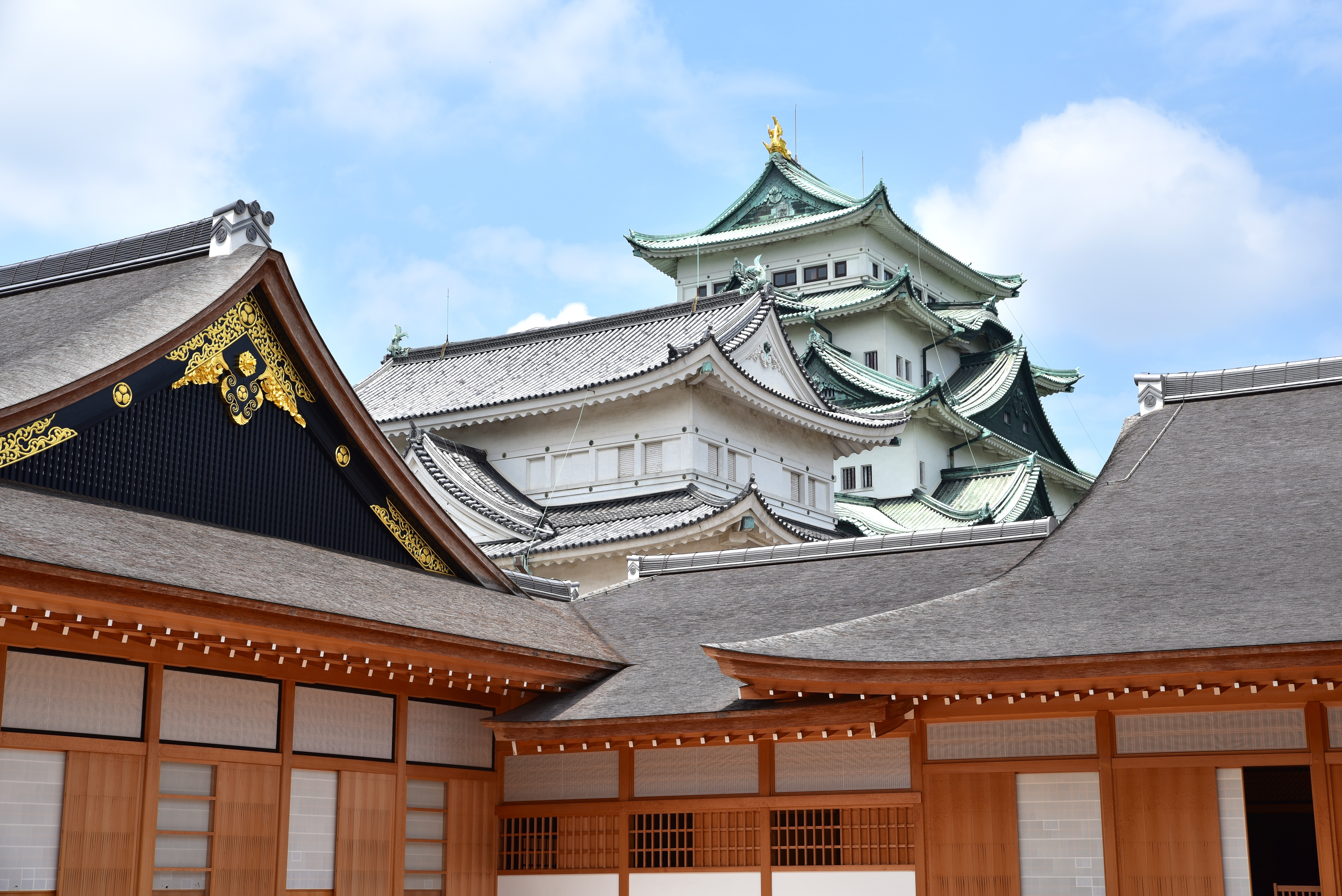
Nagoya Castle

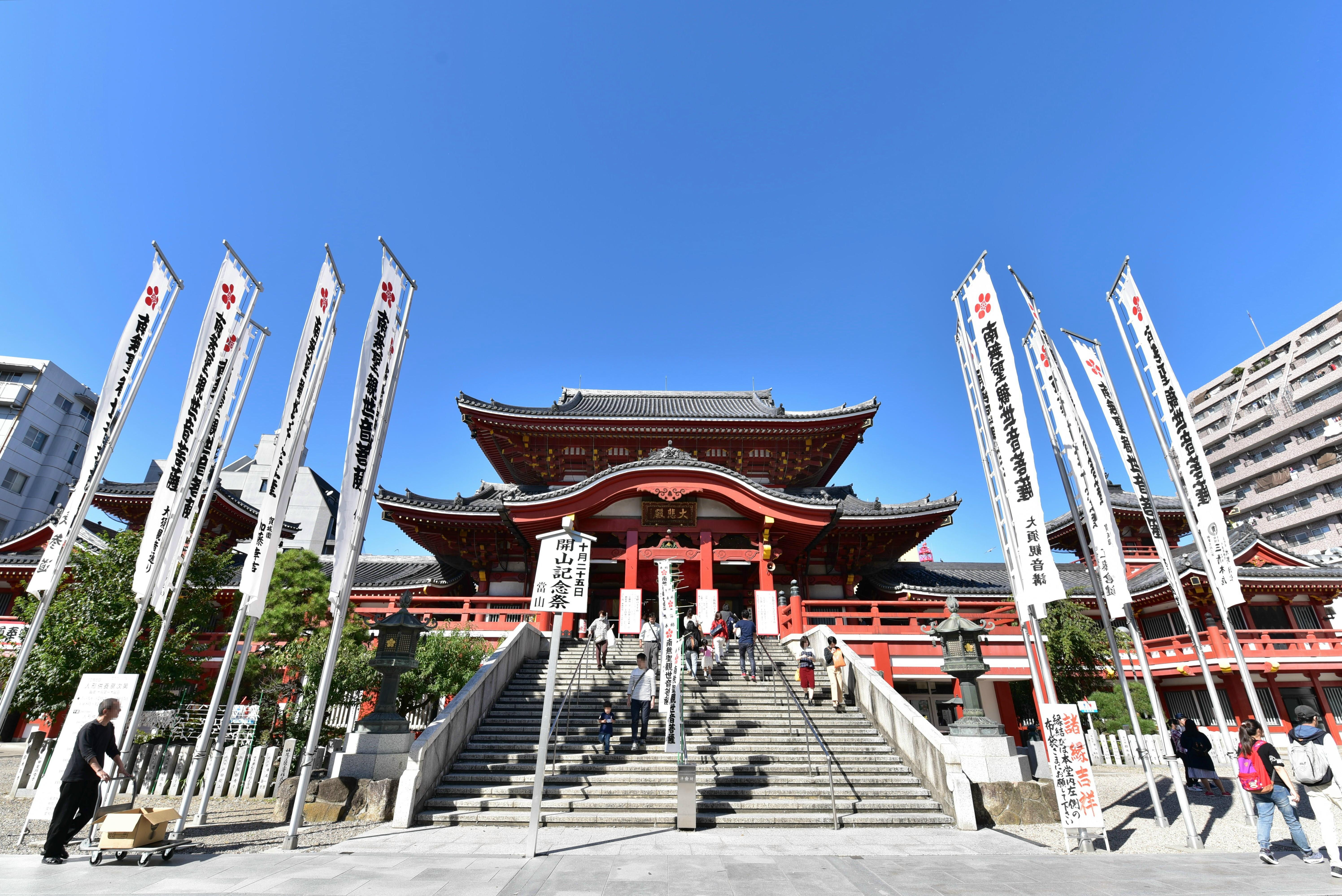
Ōsu Kannon, Naka, Nagoya

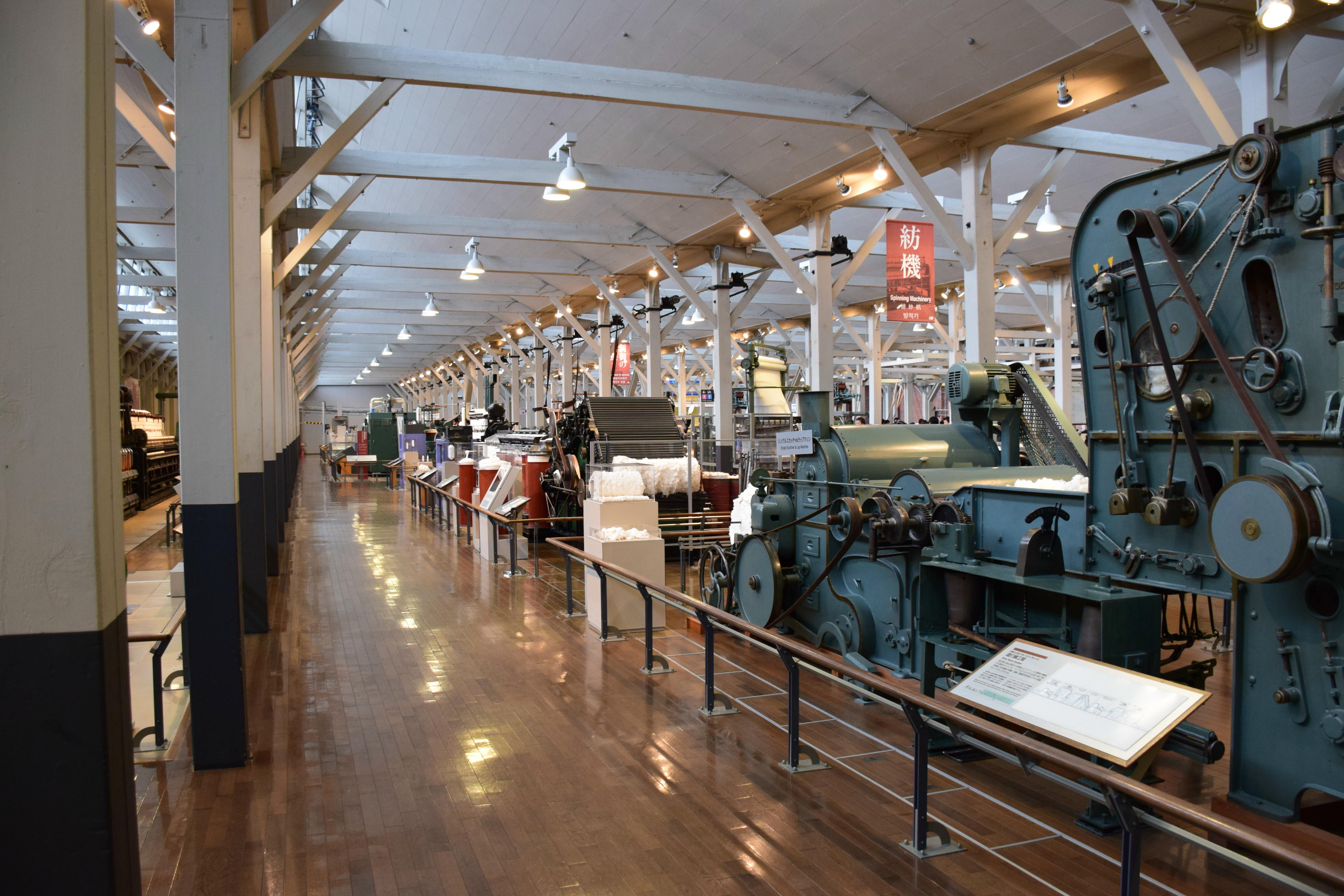
Toyota Commemorative Museum of Industry and Technology

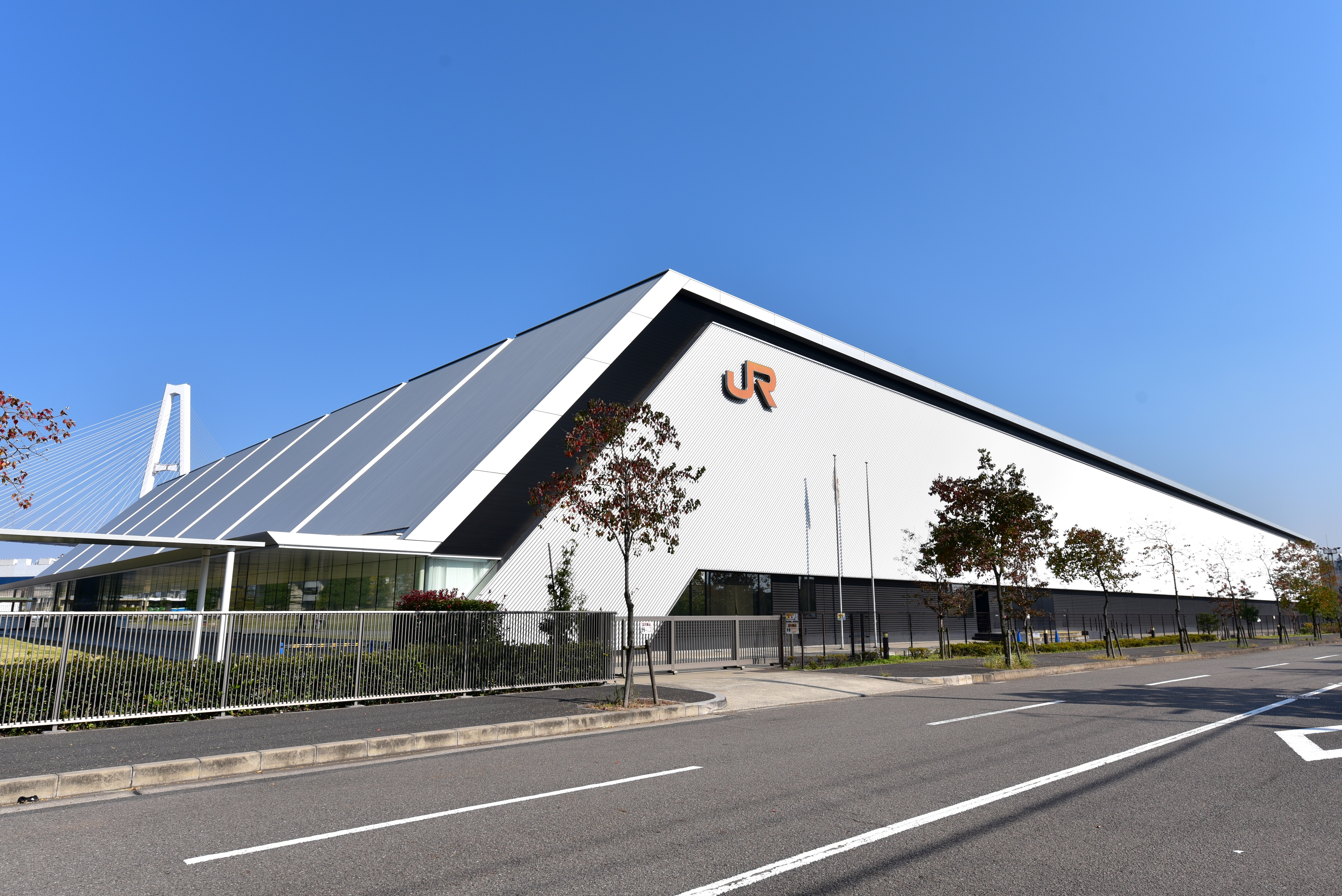
SCMaglev and Railway Park

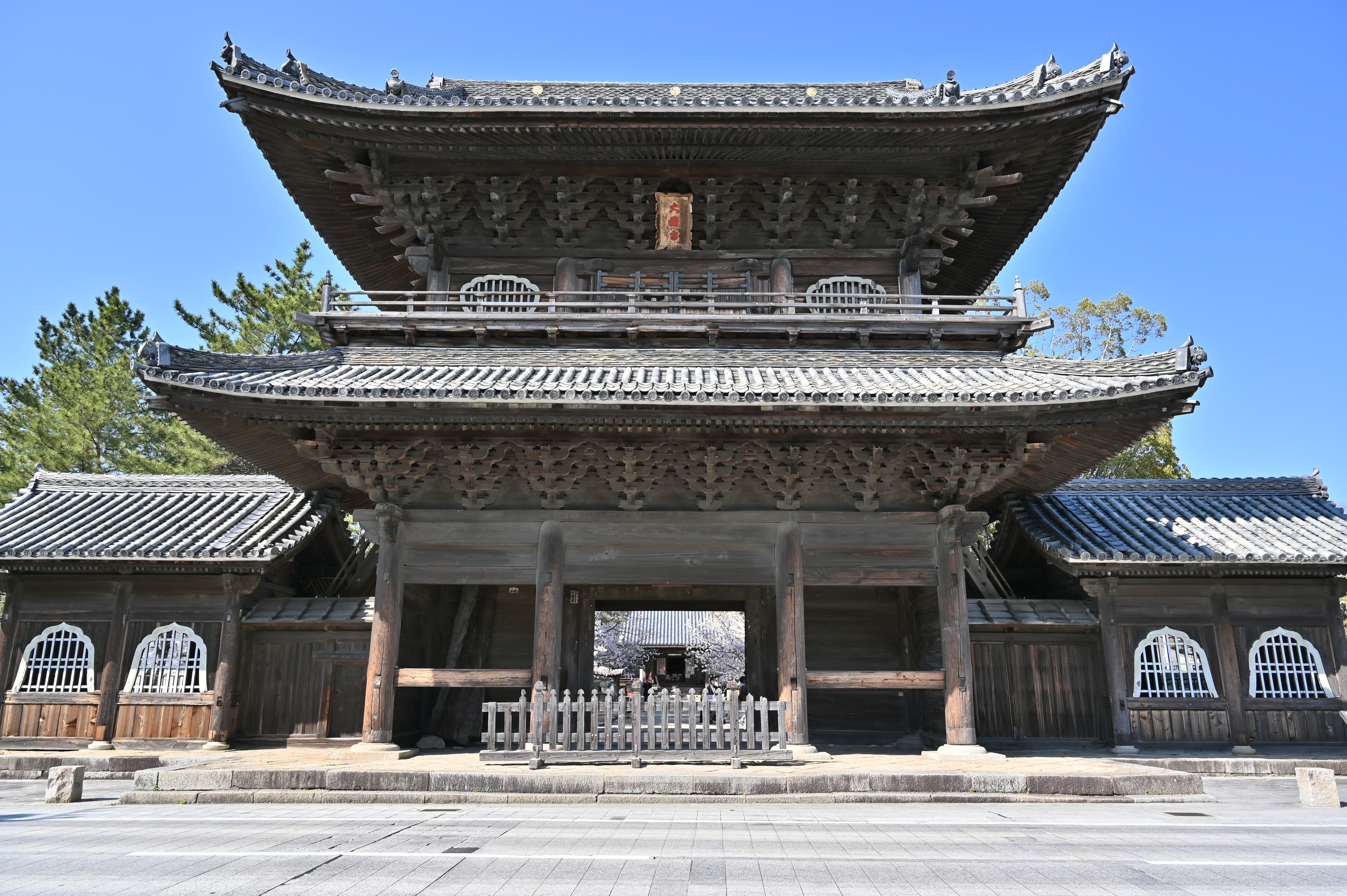
Daiju-ji

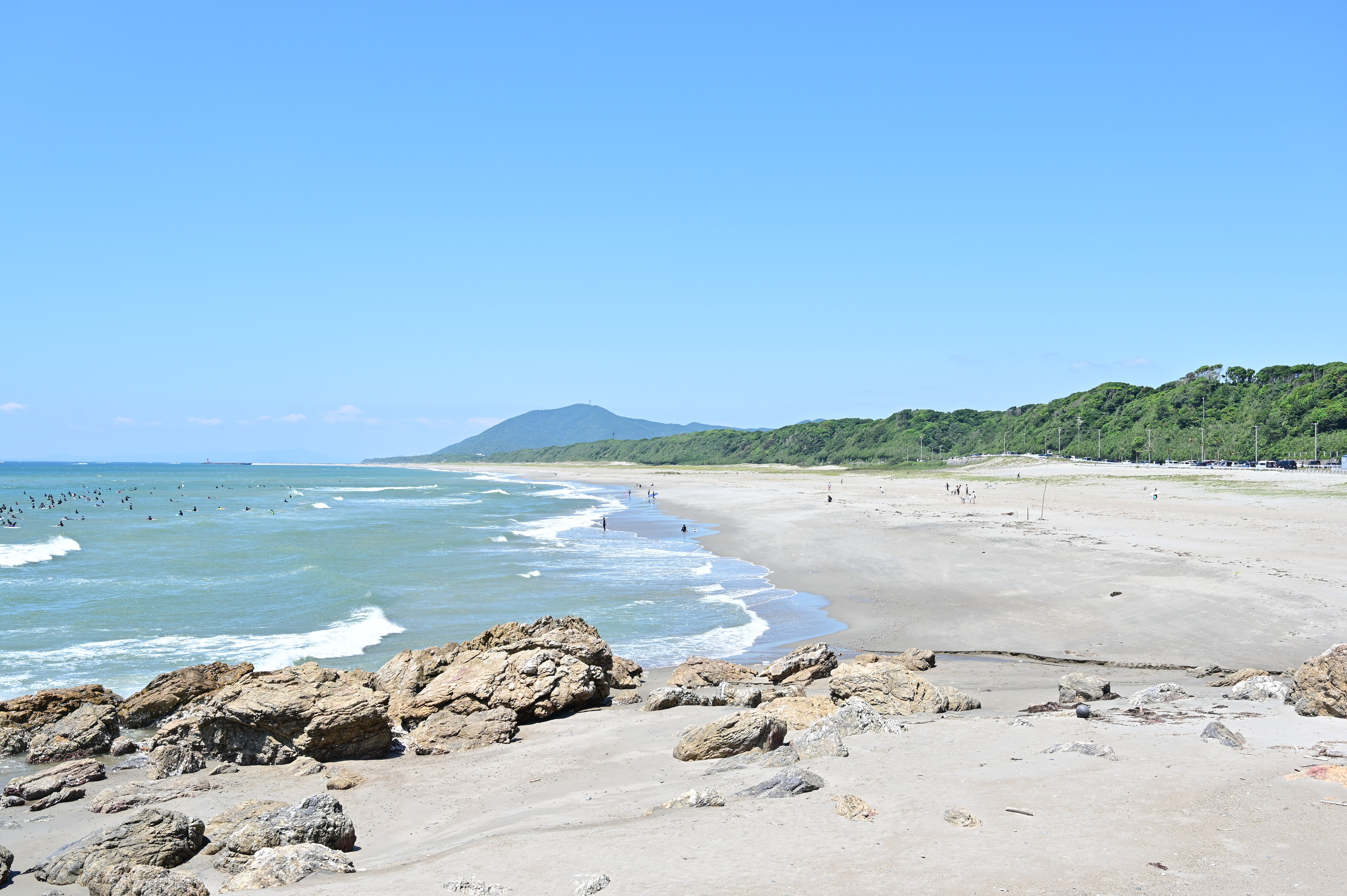
Akabane Beach, Tahara

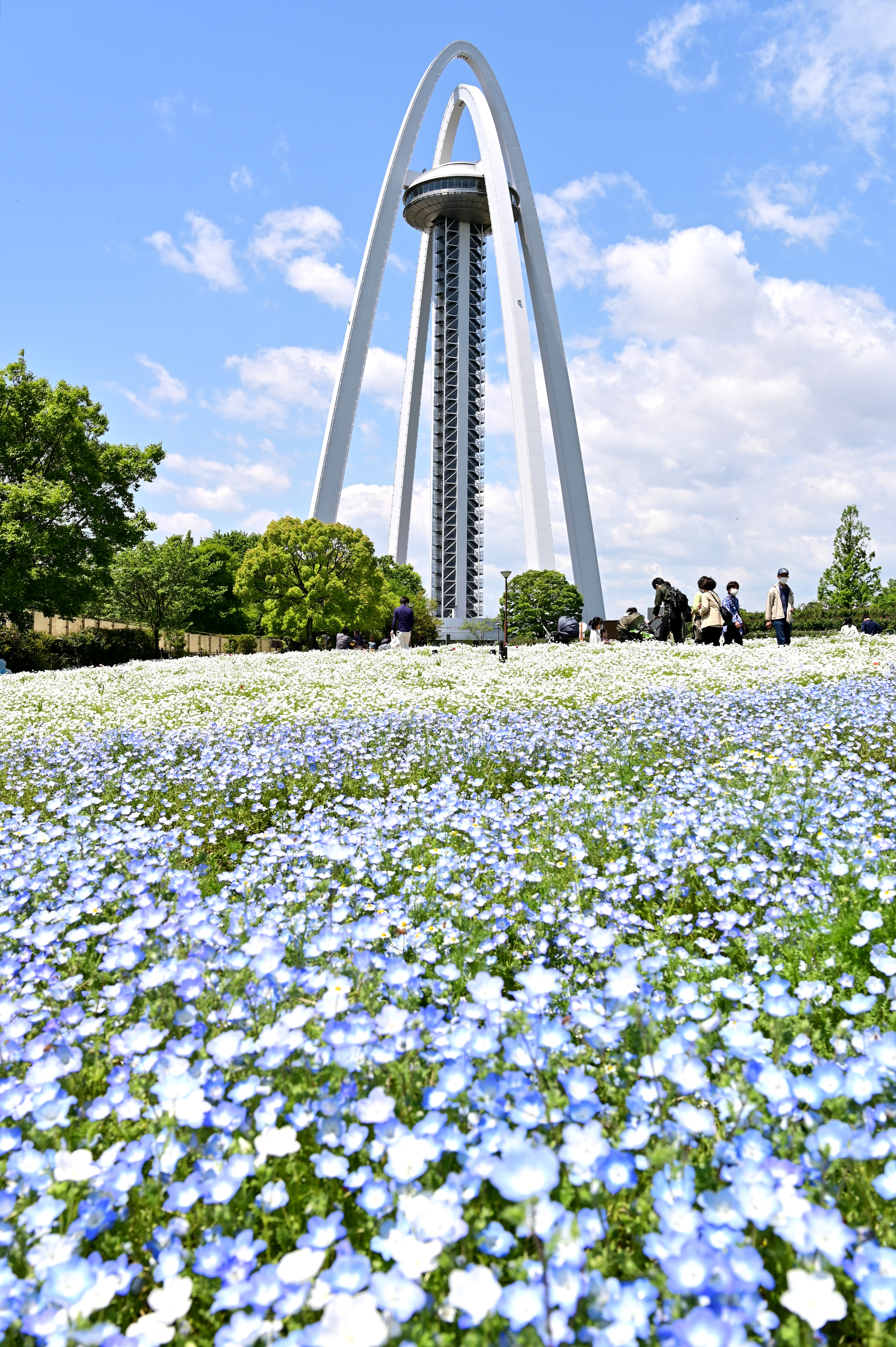
Twin Arch 138 Tower in Kiso River Park, Ichinomiya

Notable sites in Aichi include the Meiji Mura open-air architectural museum in Inuyama, which preserves historic buildings from Japan's Meiji and Taishō periods, including the reconstructed lobby of Frank Lloyd Wright's old Imperial Hotel (which originally stood in Tokyo from 1923 to 1967).

Other popular sites in Aichi include the tour of Toyota car factory in the city by the same name, the monkey park in Inuyama, and the castles in Nagoya, Okazaki, Toyohashi, and Inuyama.

Aichi Prefecture has many beaches, including Himakajima Beach, Shinojima Beach, Akabane Beach and Utsumi Beach.

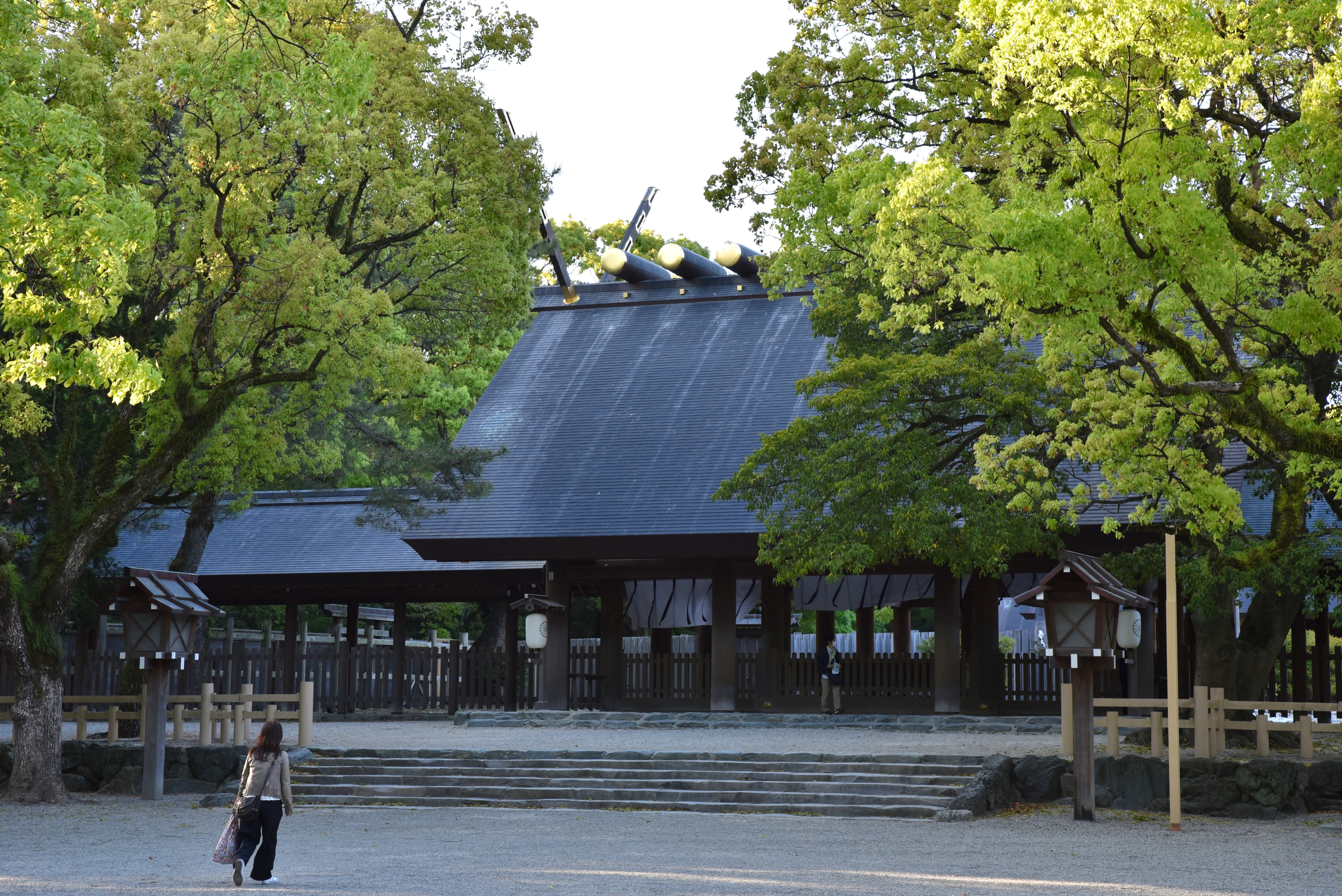
Atsuta Shrine

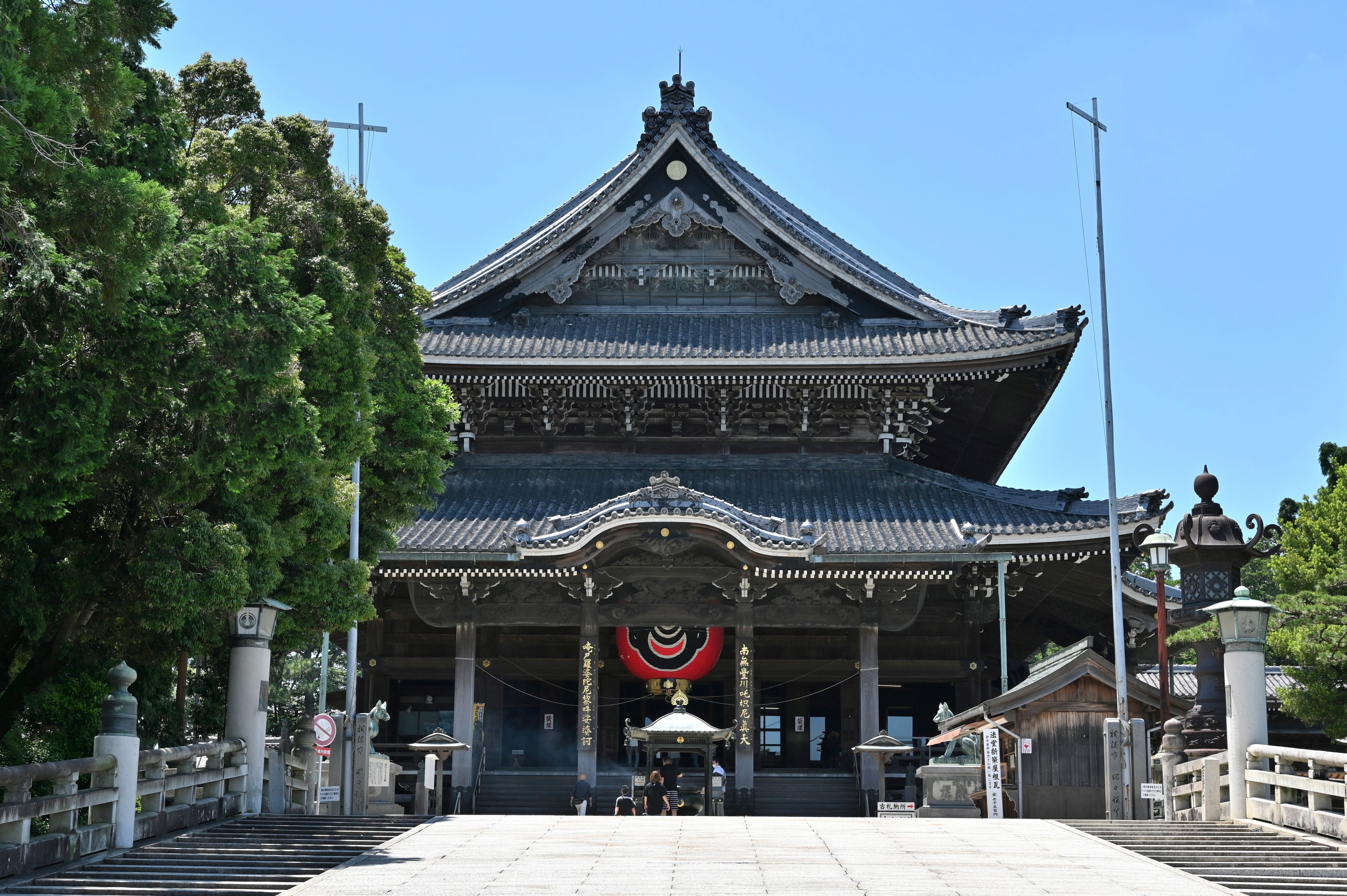
Toyokawa Inari

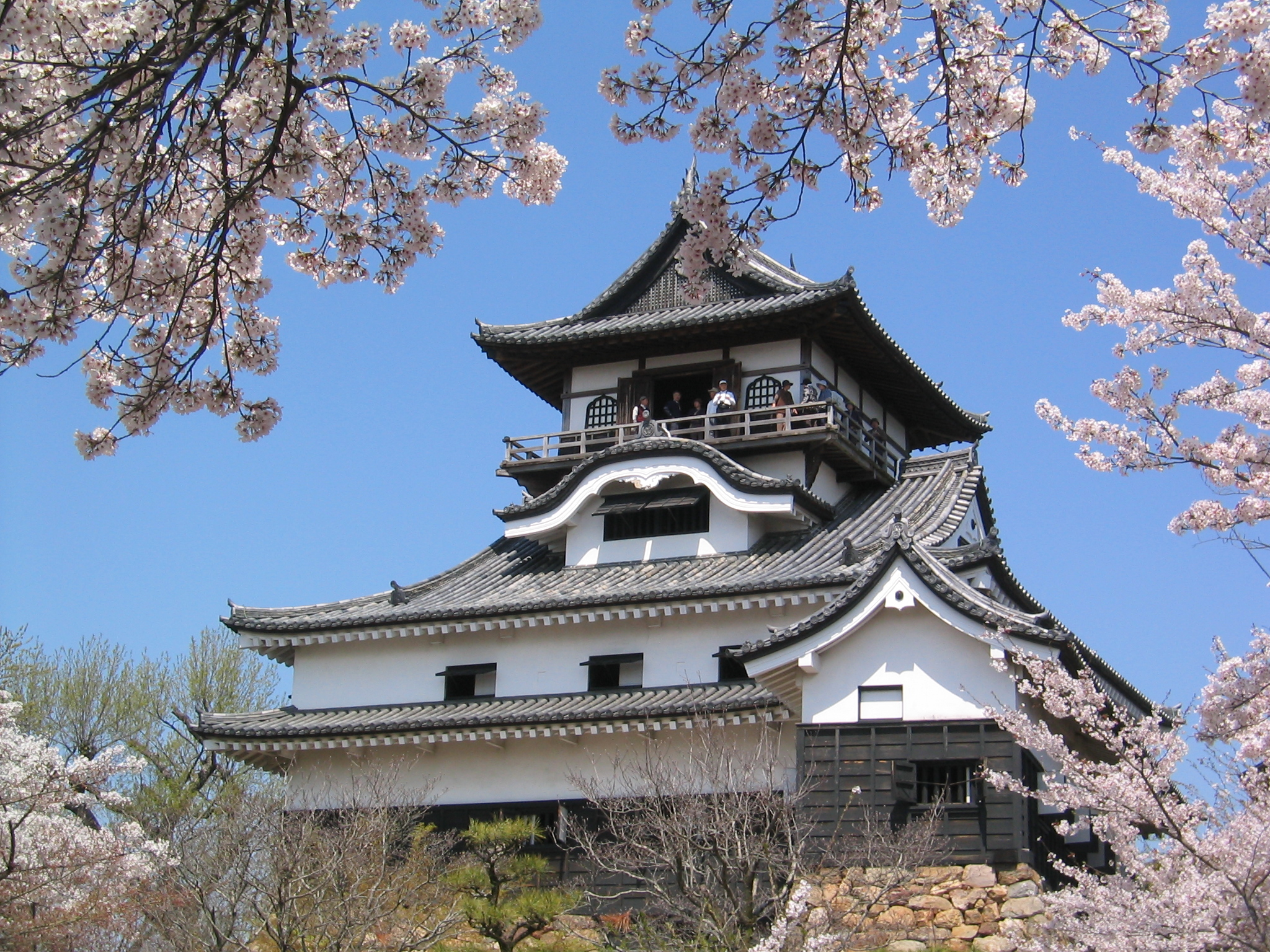
Inuyama Castle

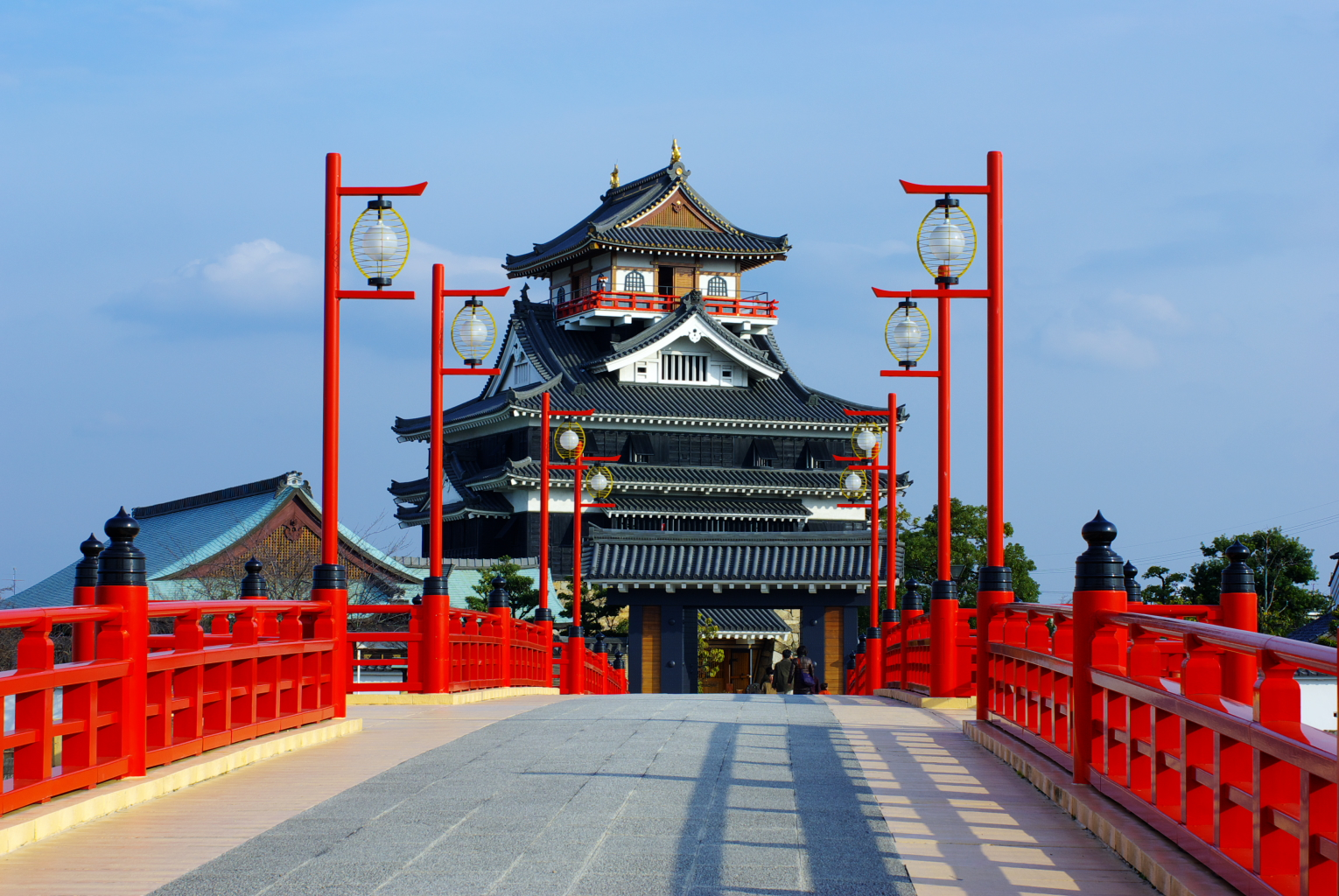
Kiyosu Castle and Kiyosu Castle Park in Kiyosu

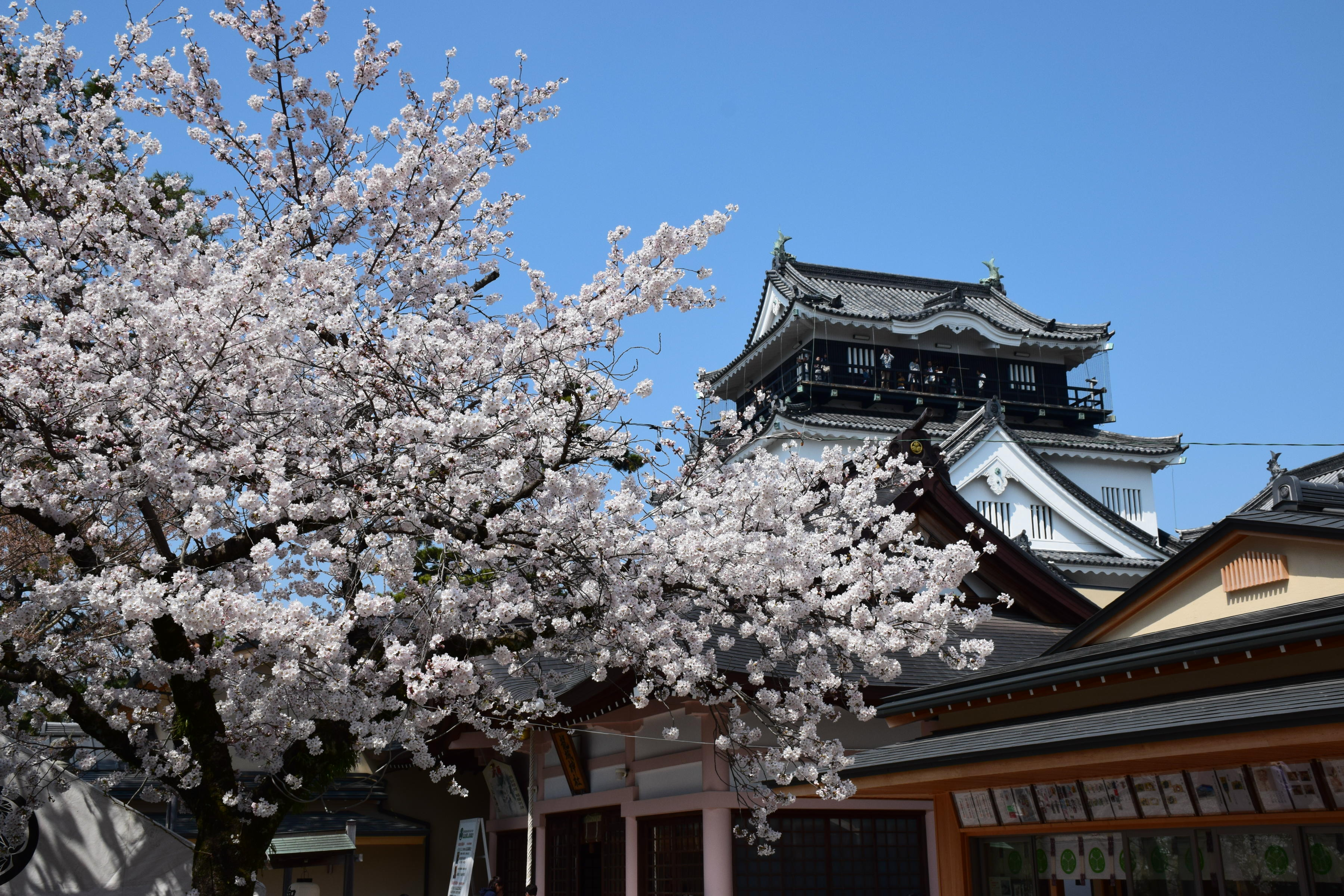
Okazaki Castle

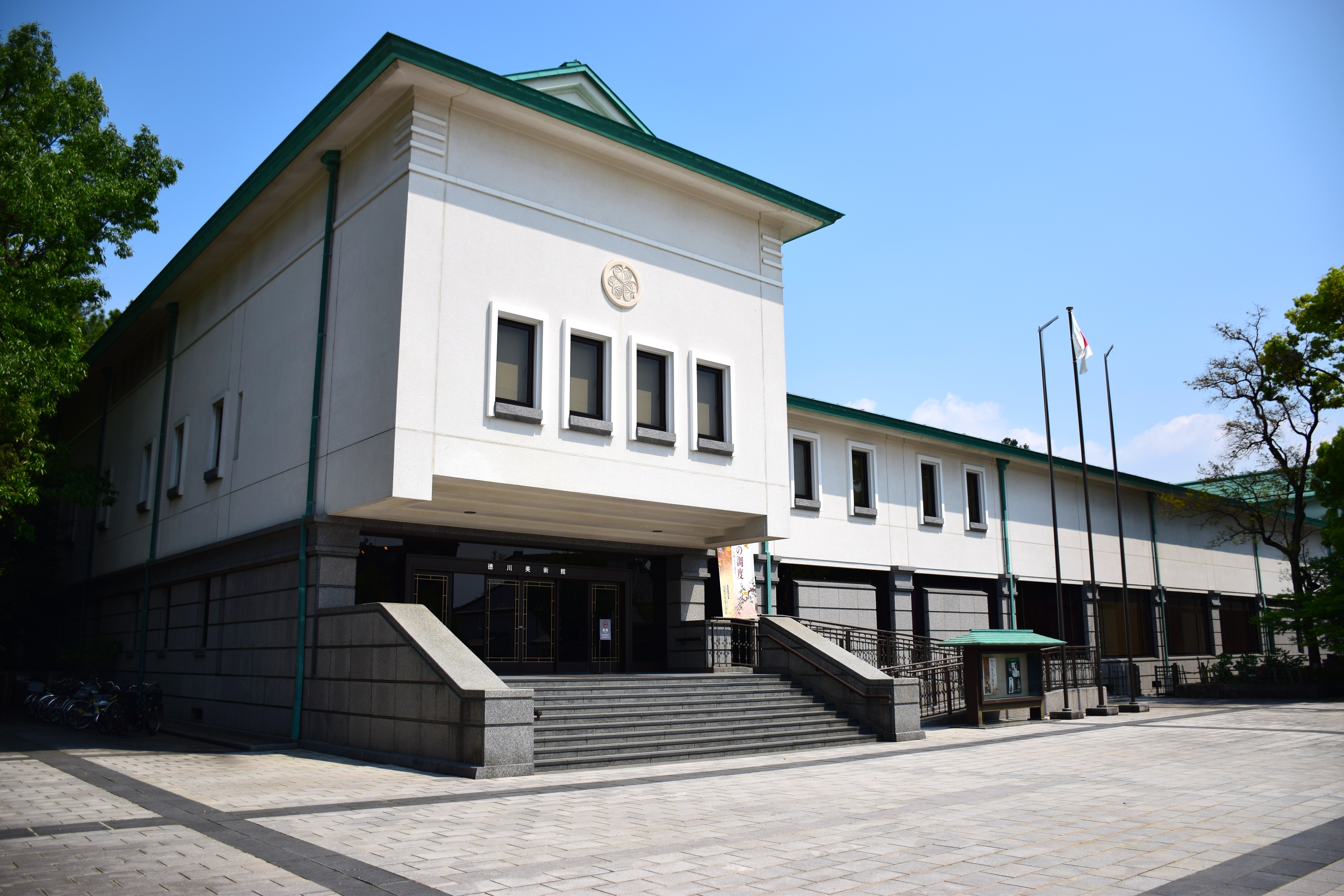
Tokugawa Art Museum

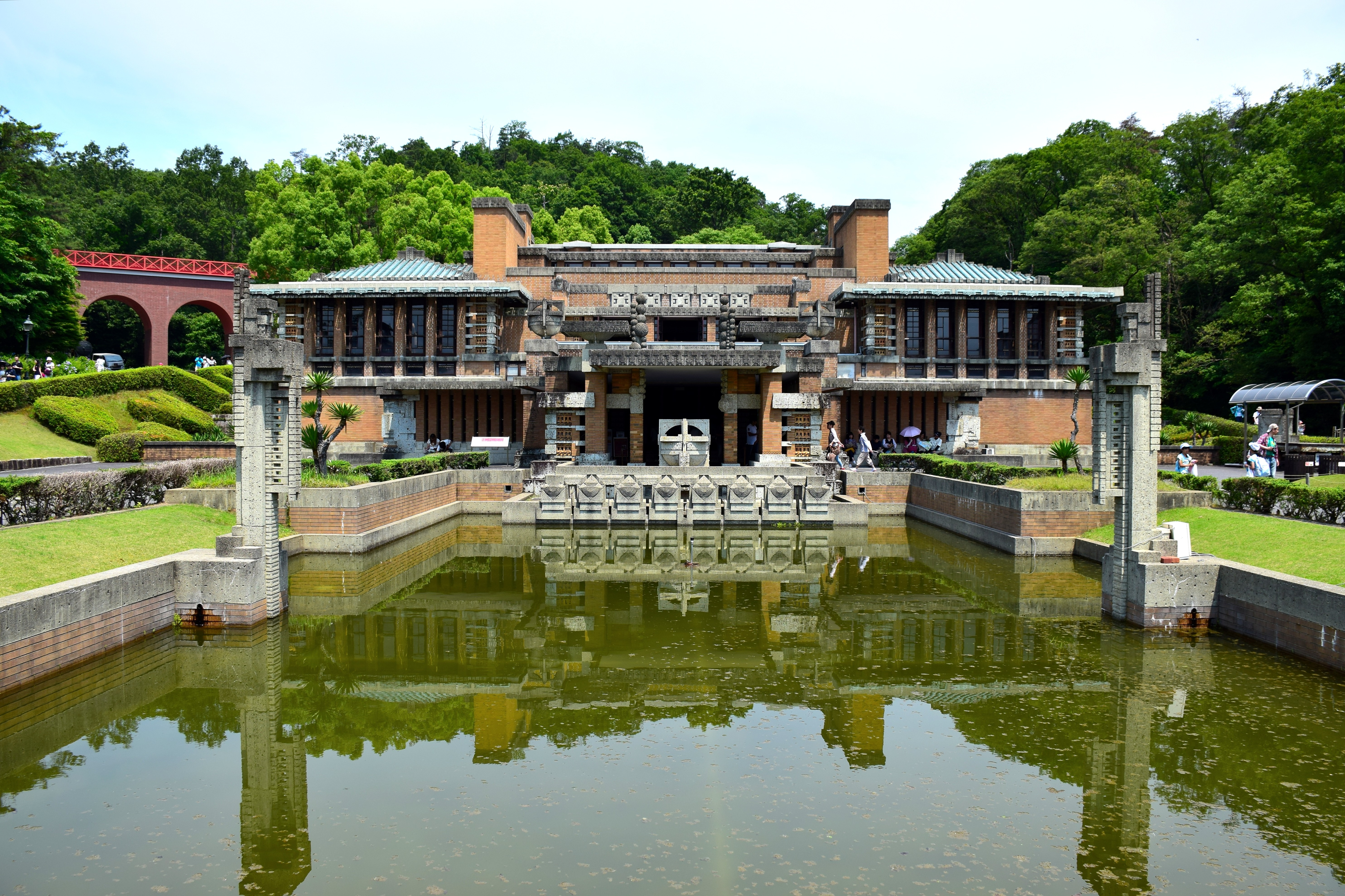
Meiji-mura

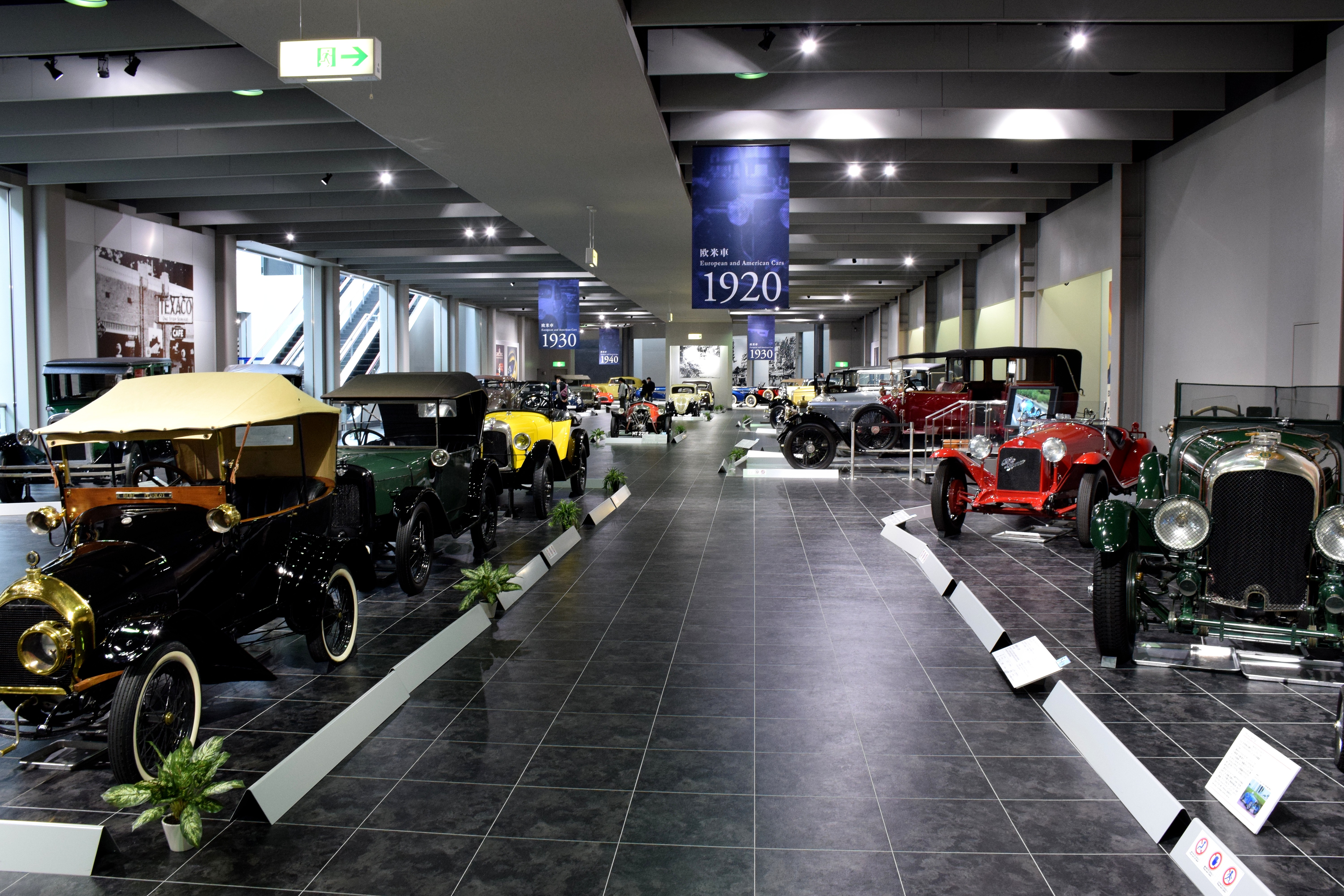
Toyota Automobile Museum

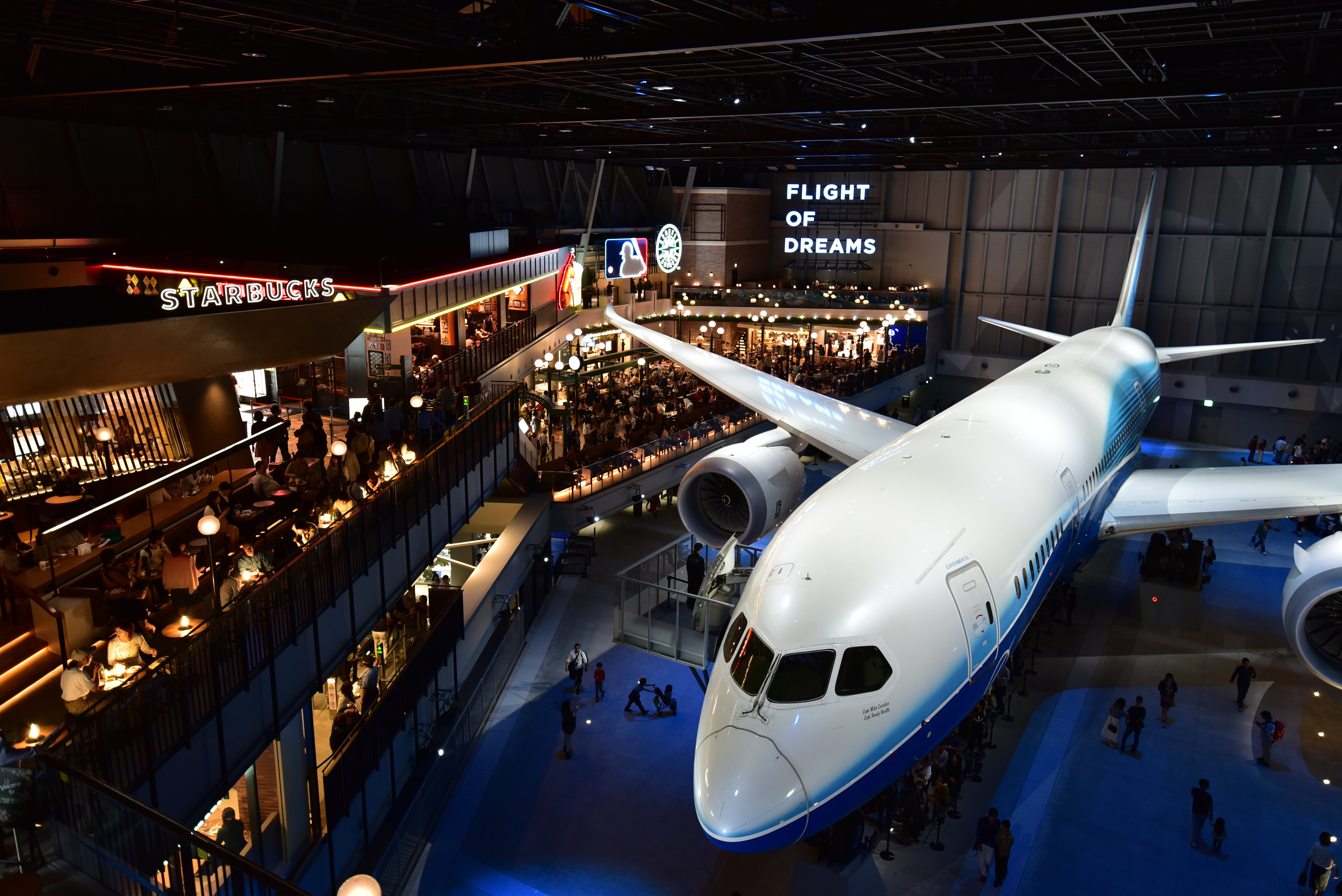
Flight of Dreams

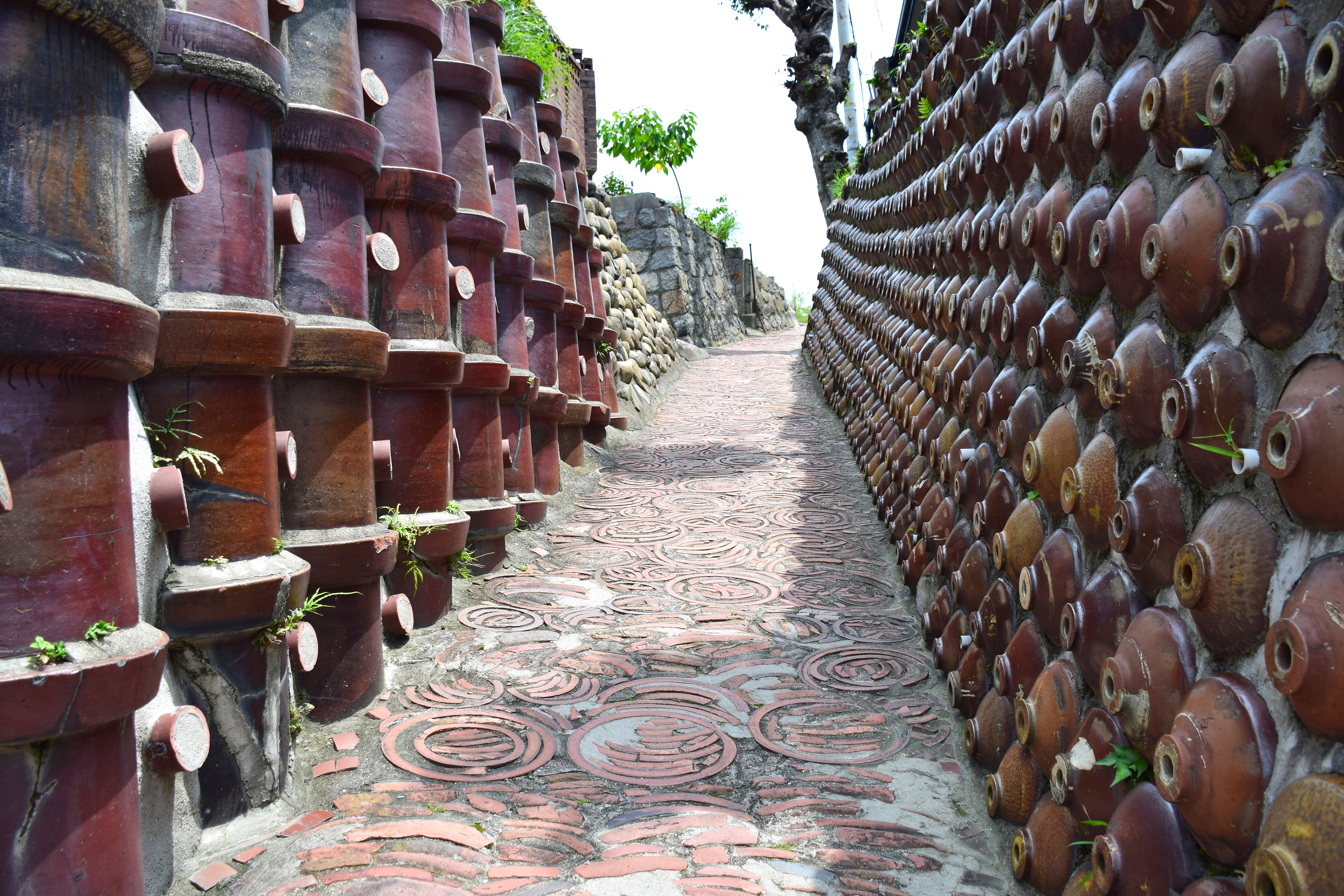
Tokoname pottery footpath

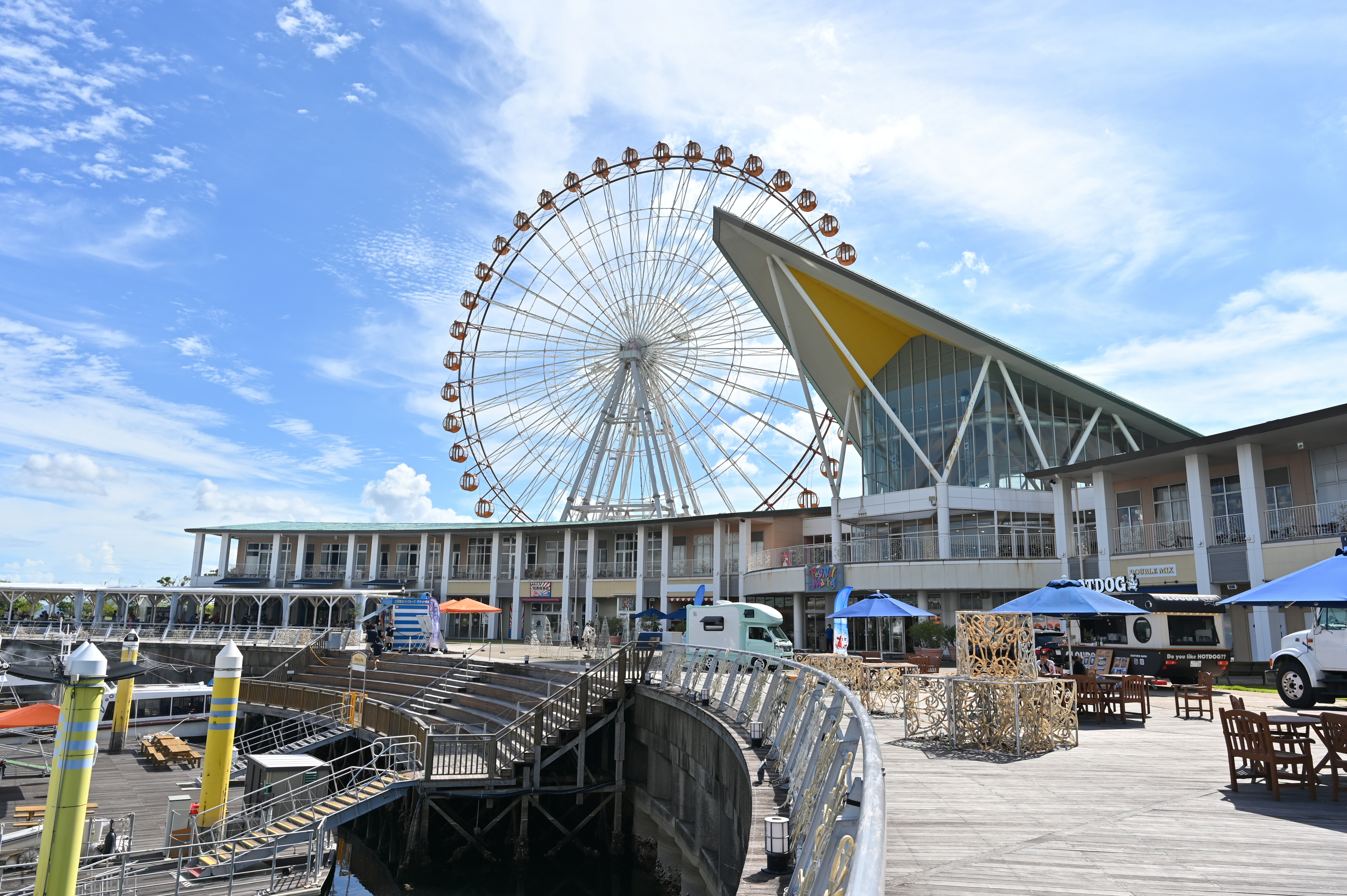
Laguna Ten Bosch

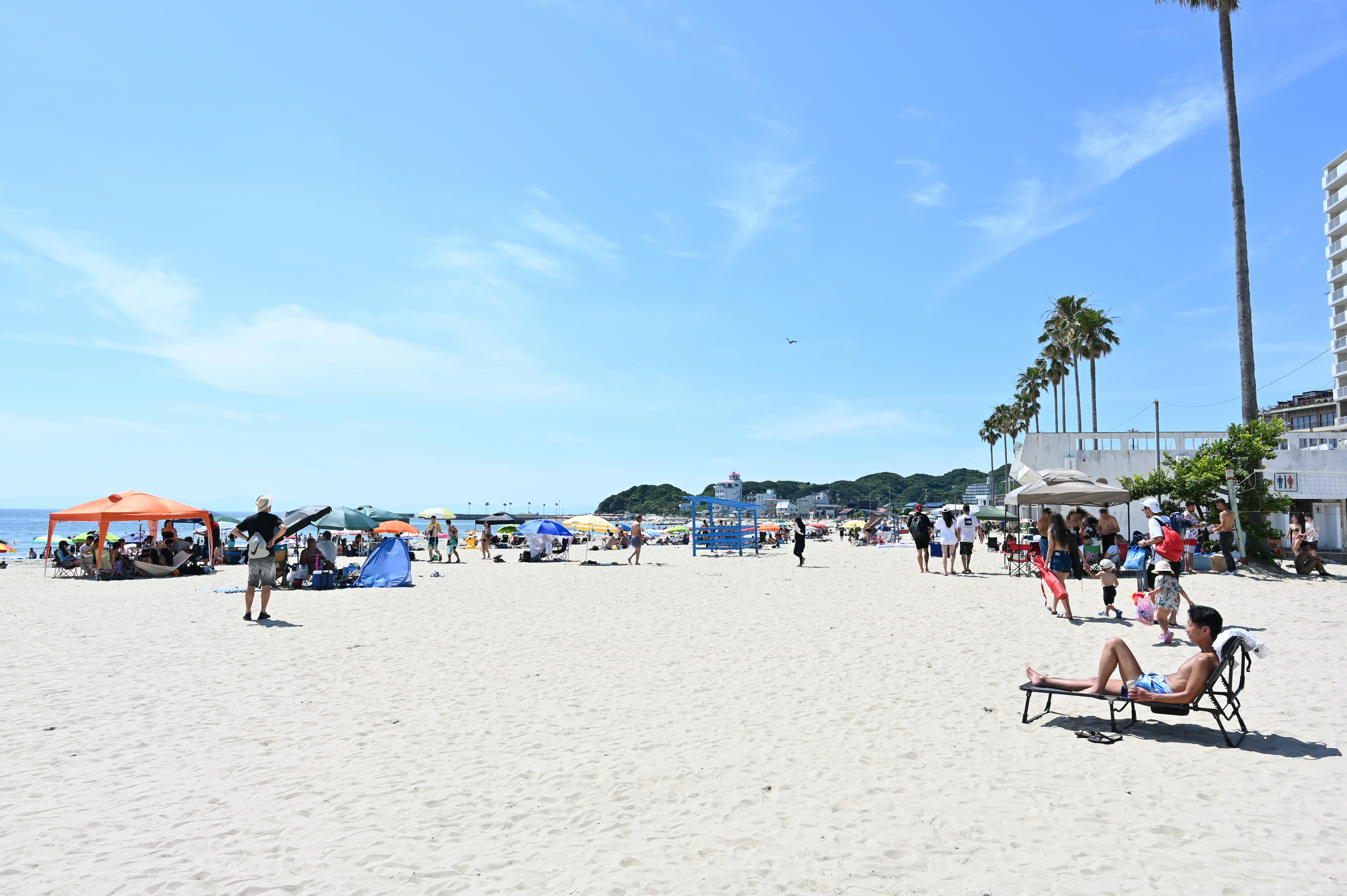
Utsumi Beach(Chidorigahama)

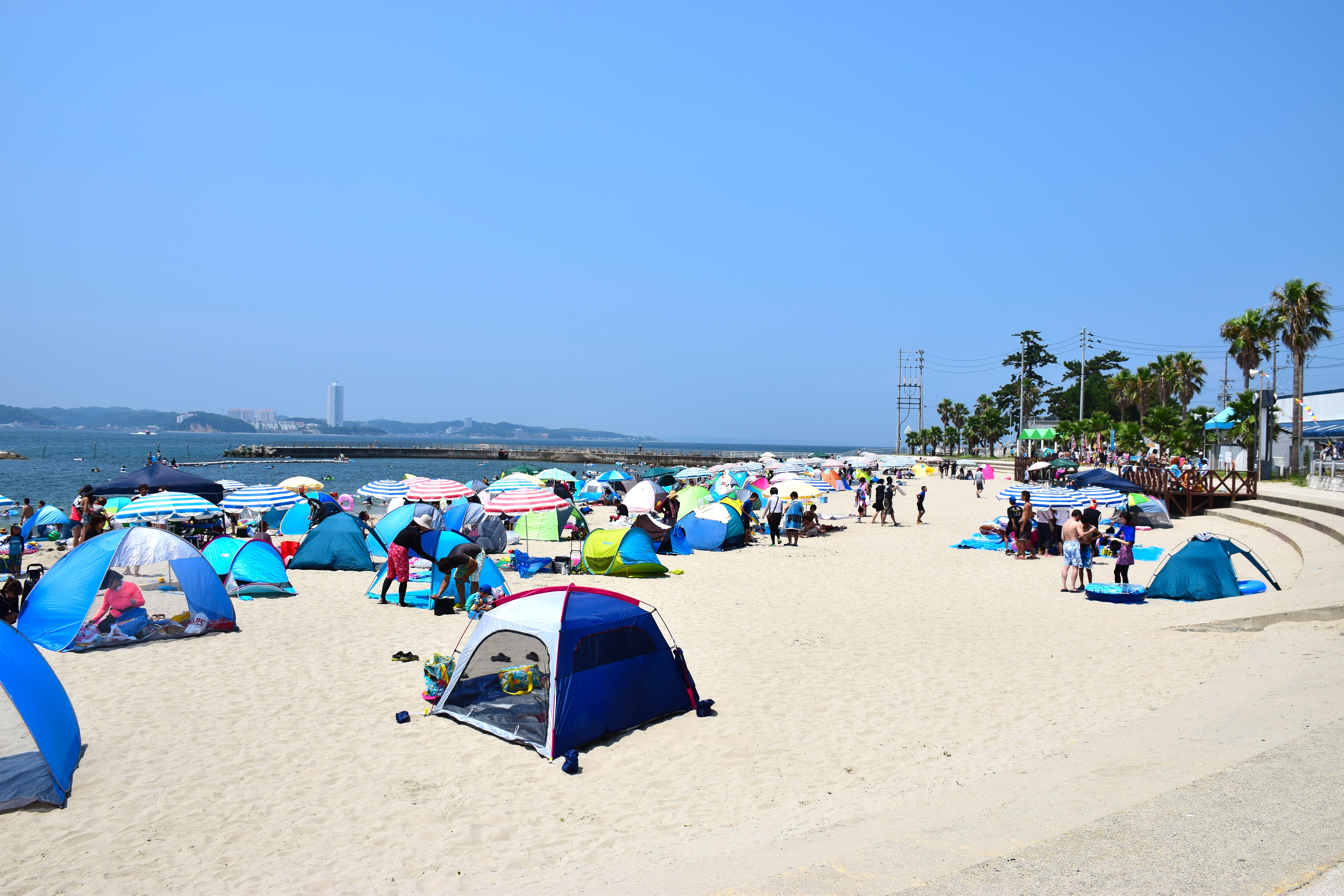
Himakajima

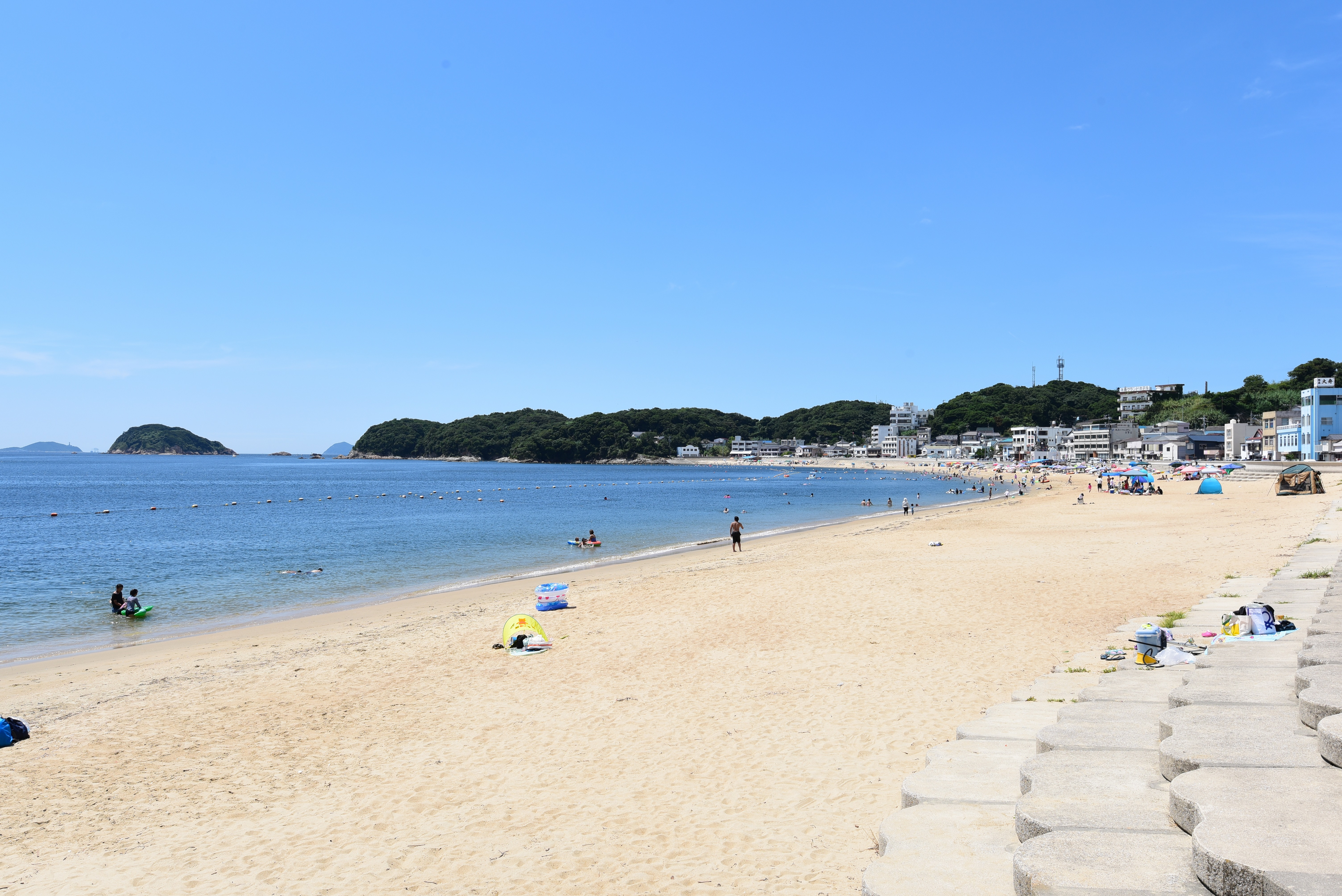
Shinojima

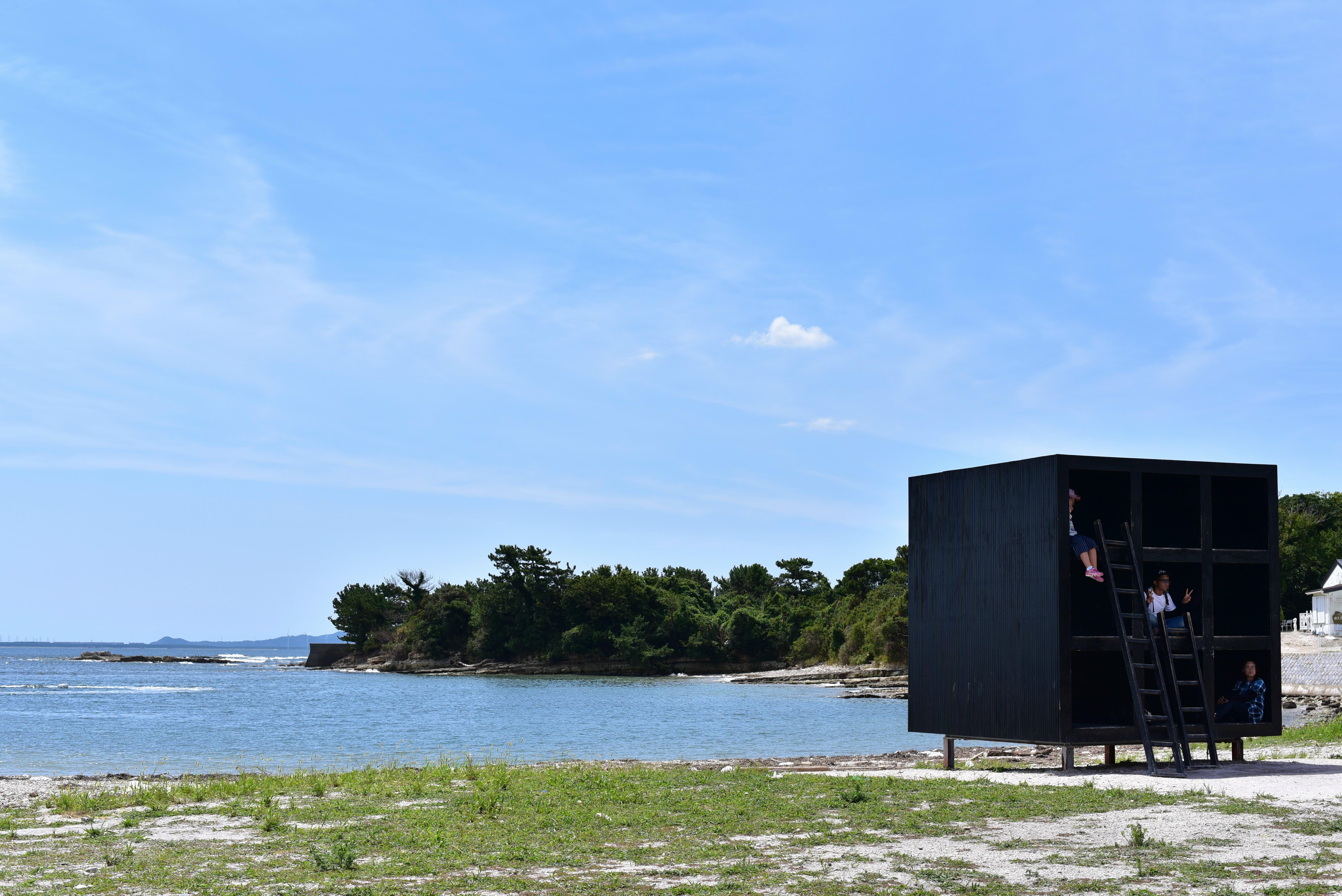
Sakushima

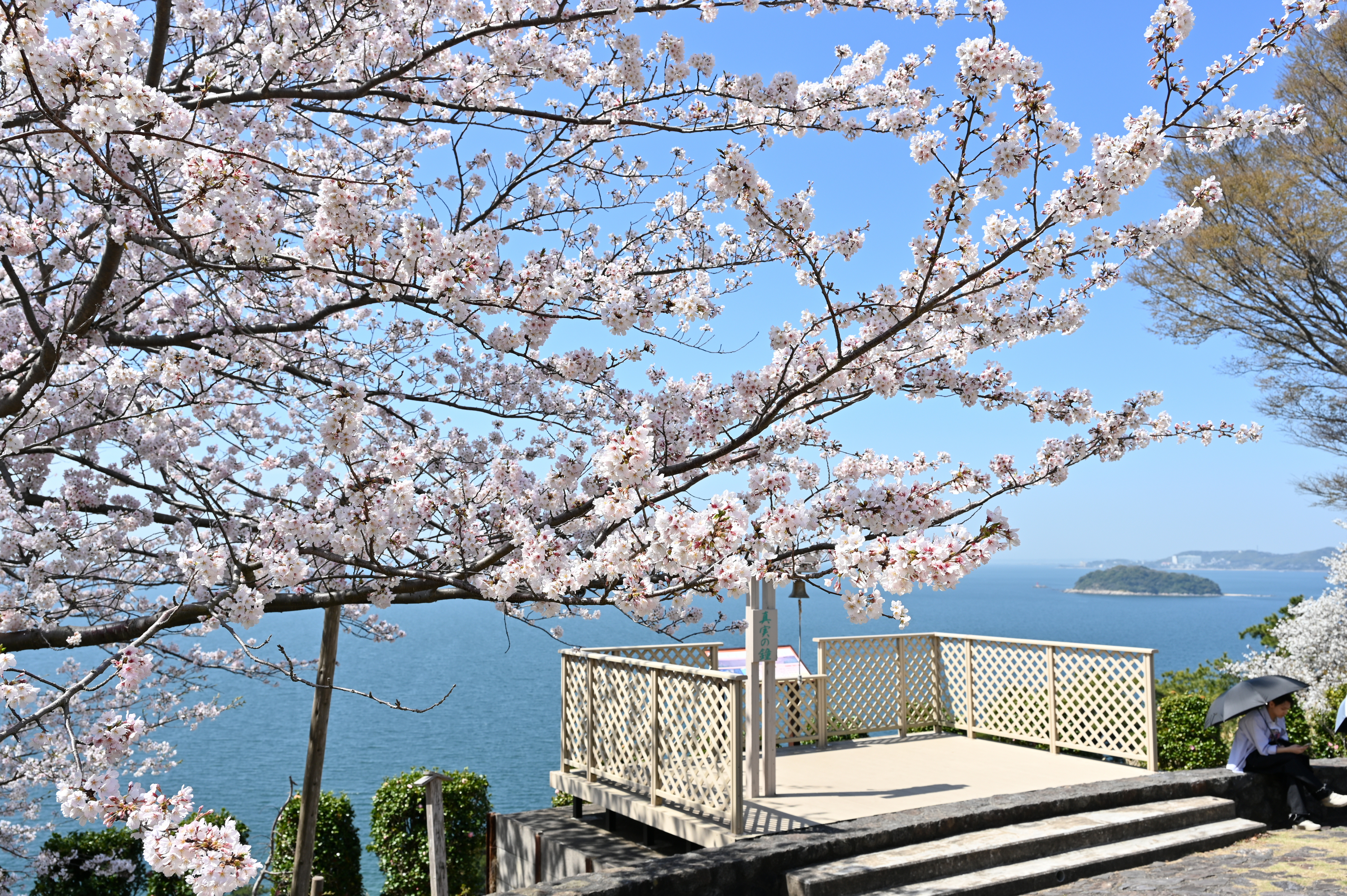
Nishiura Onsen

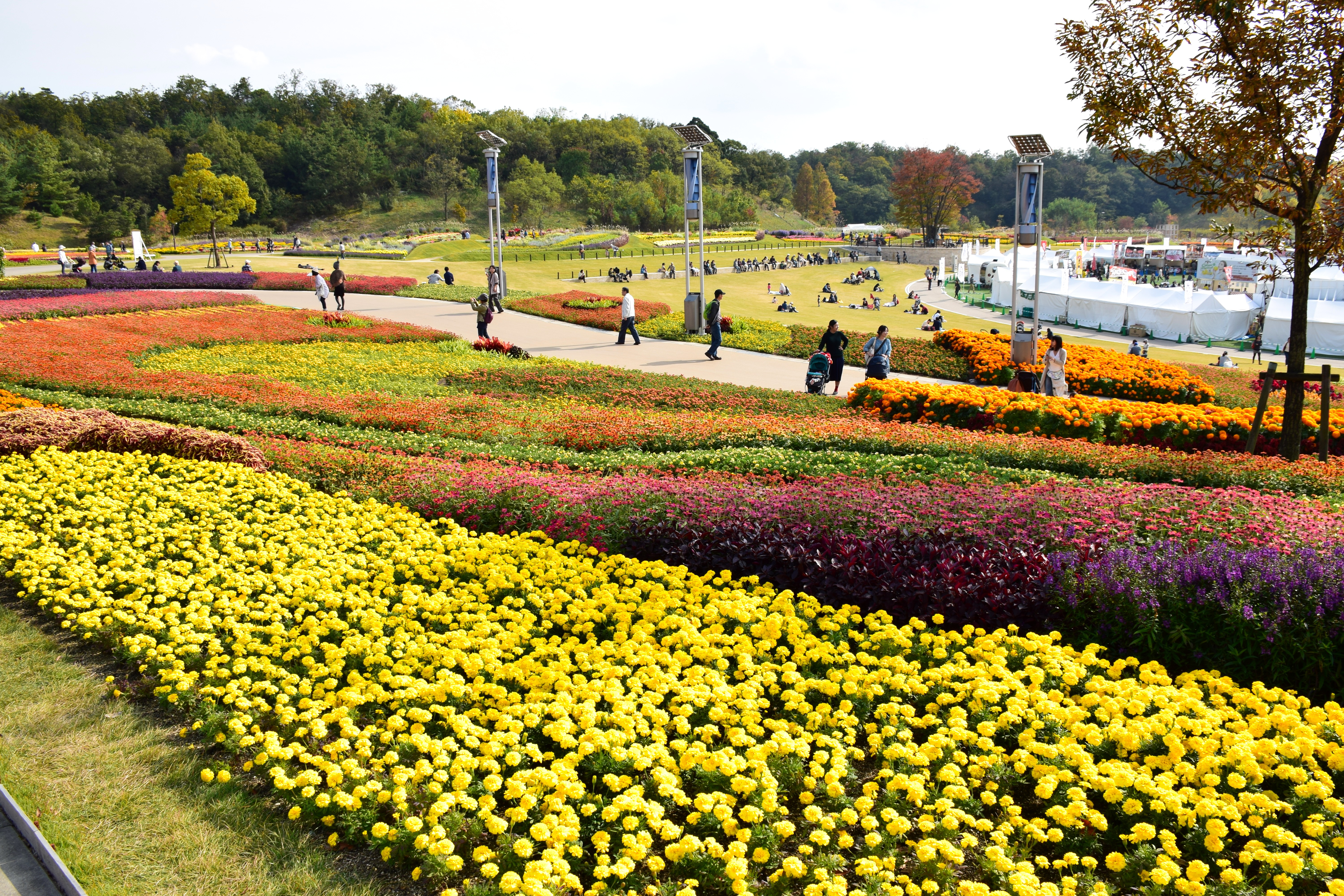
Site of Expo 2005

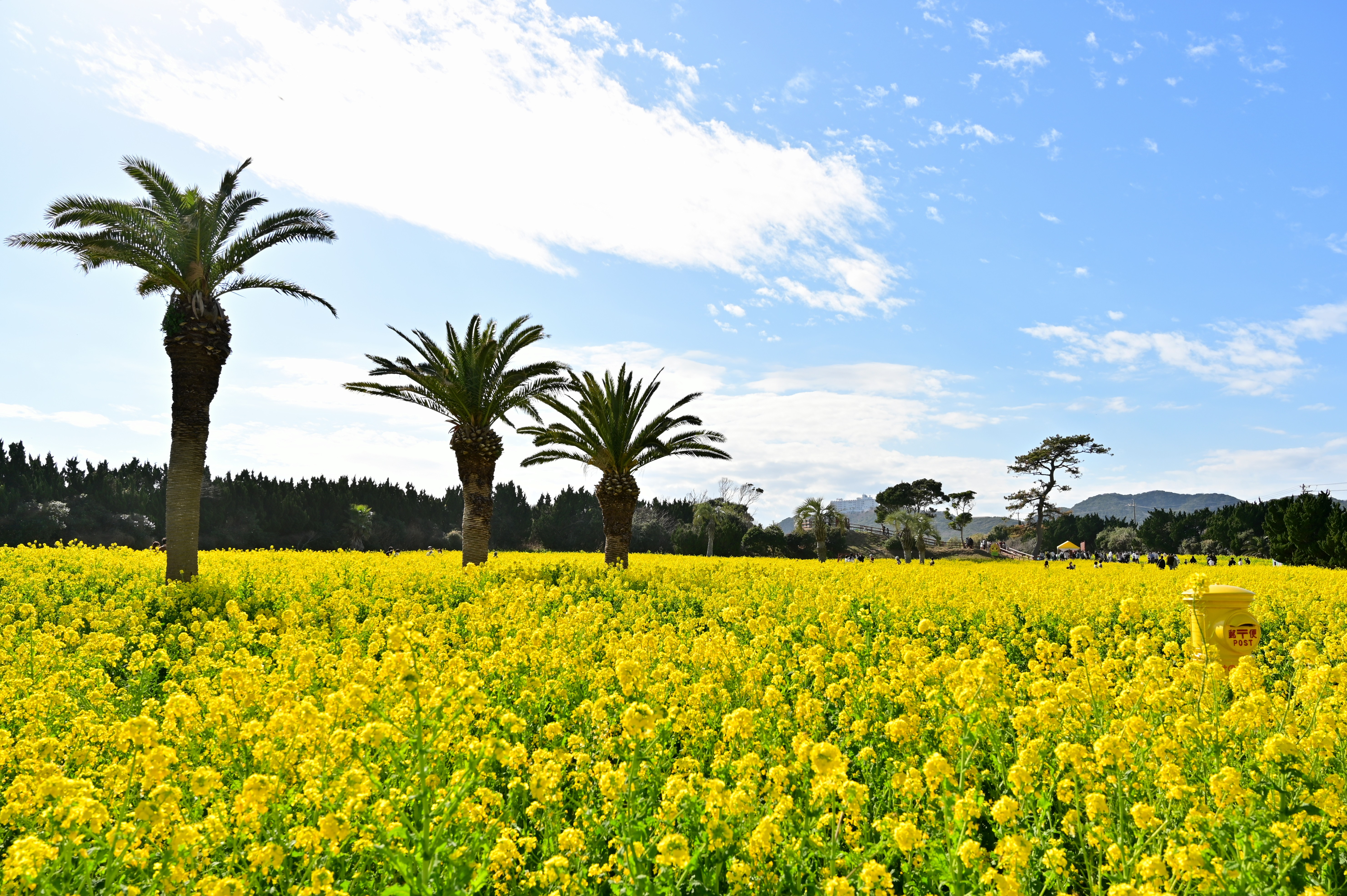
Field Mustard, Tahara

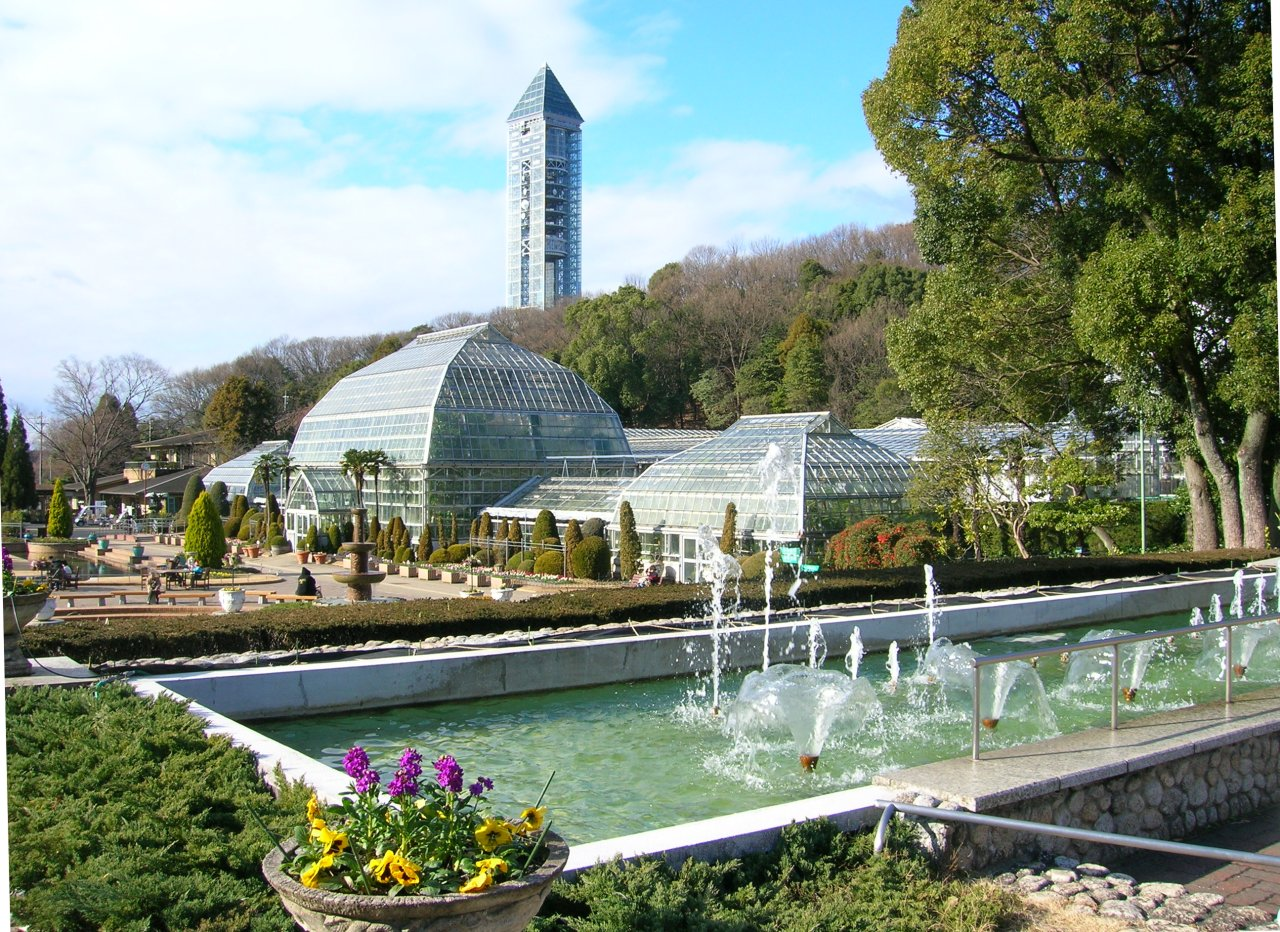
Higashiyama Zoo and Botanical Gardens

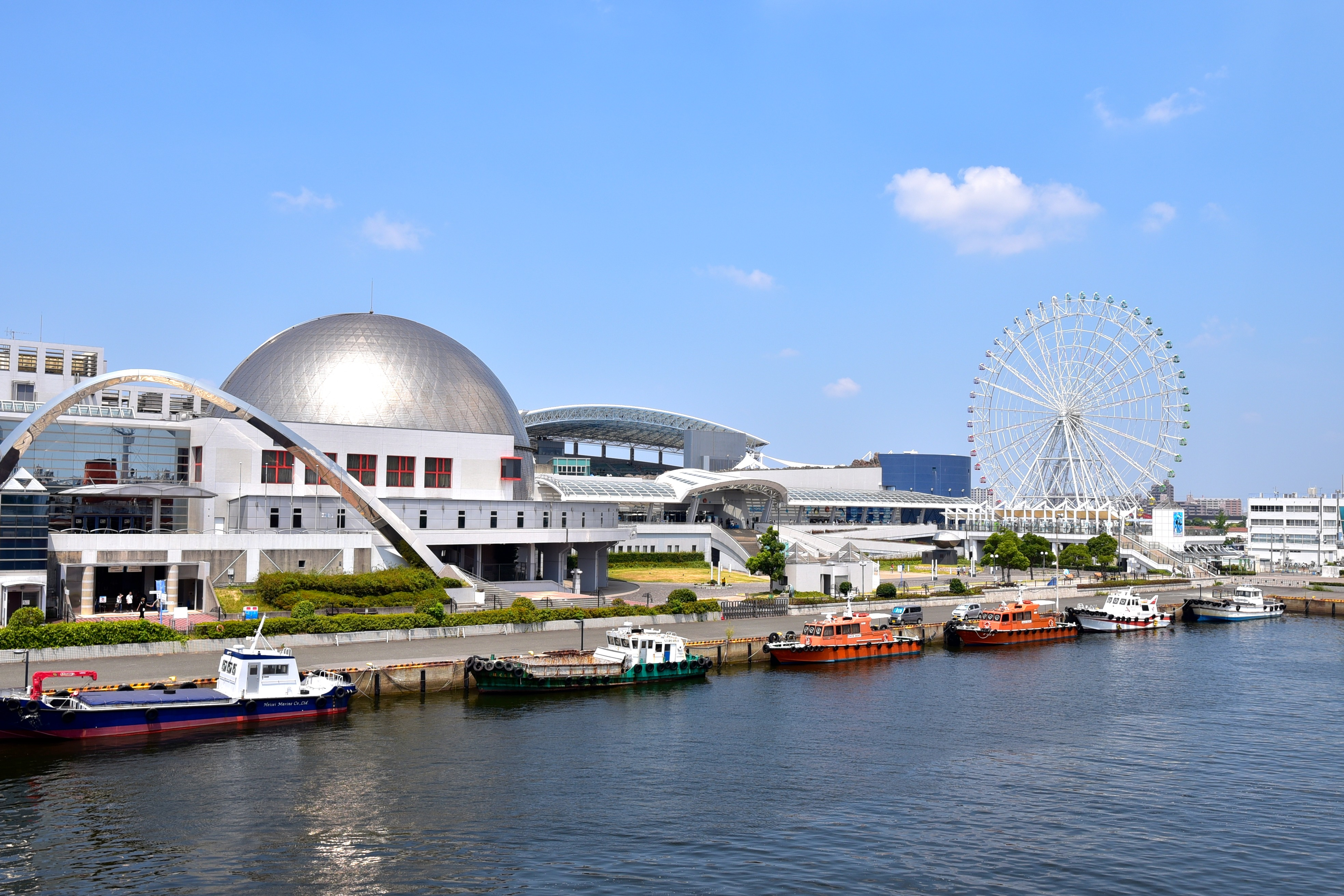
Port of Nagoya Public Aquarium

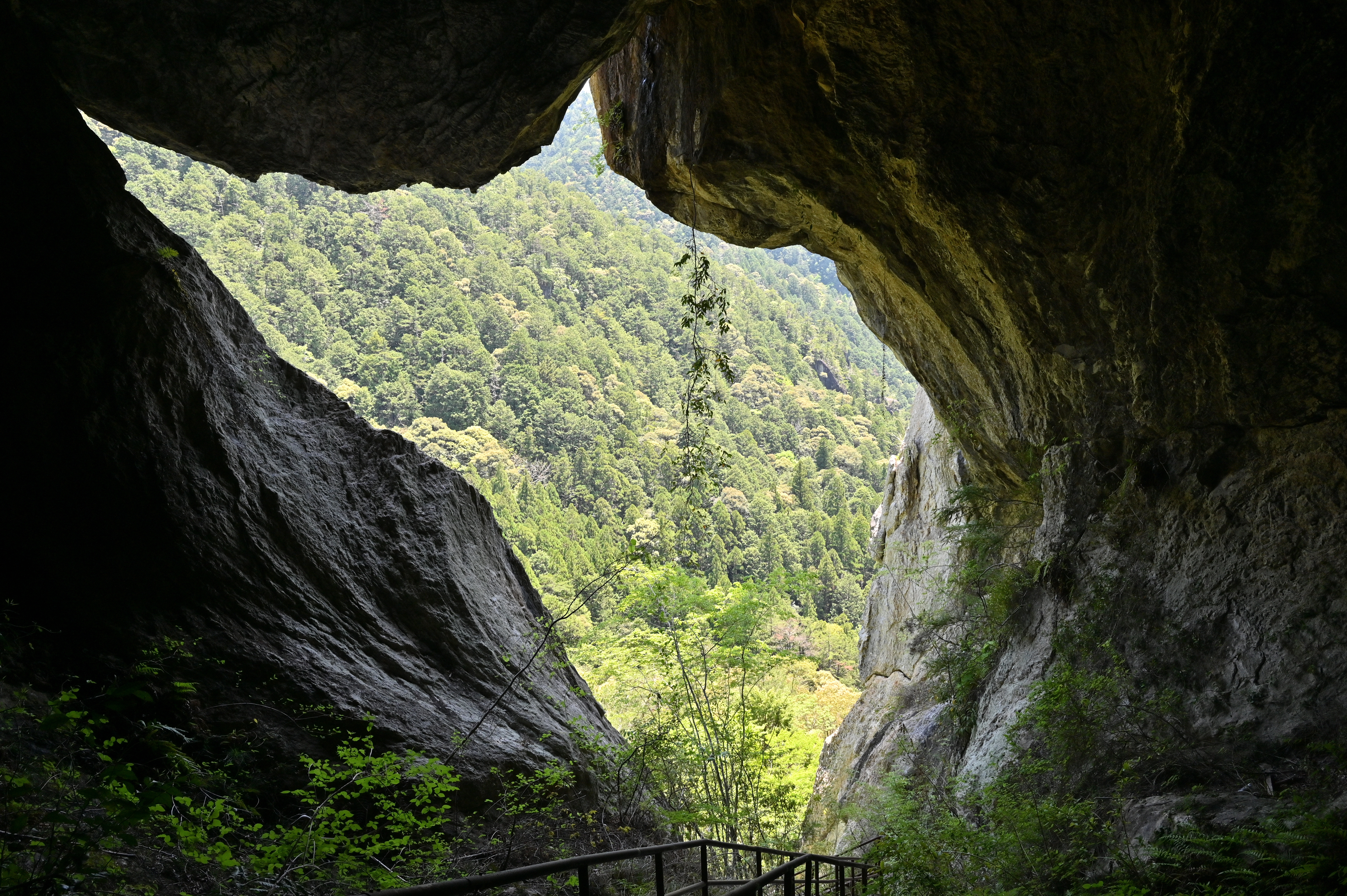
Chiiwa Gorge

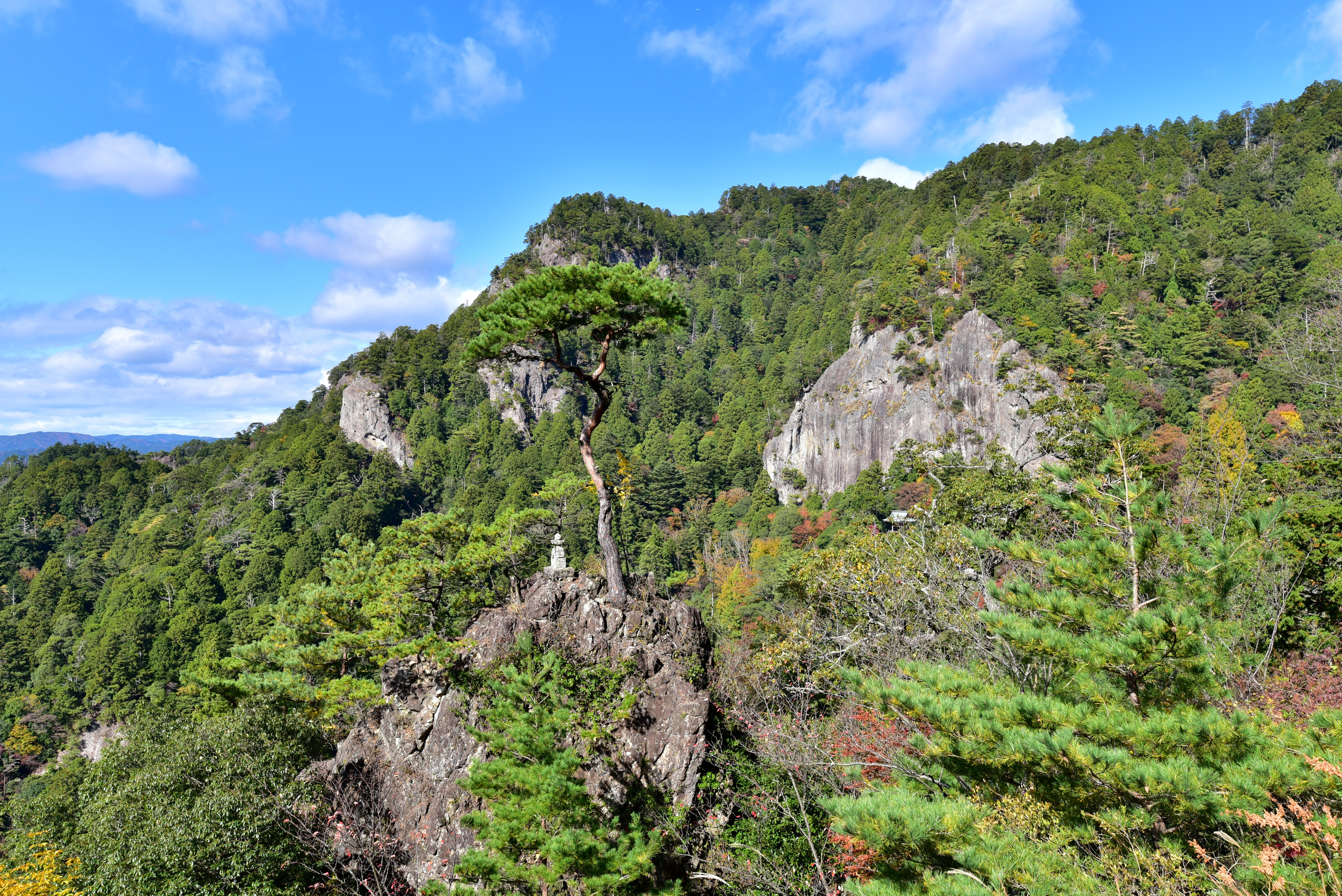
Mount Hōraiji

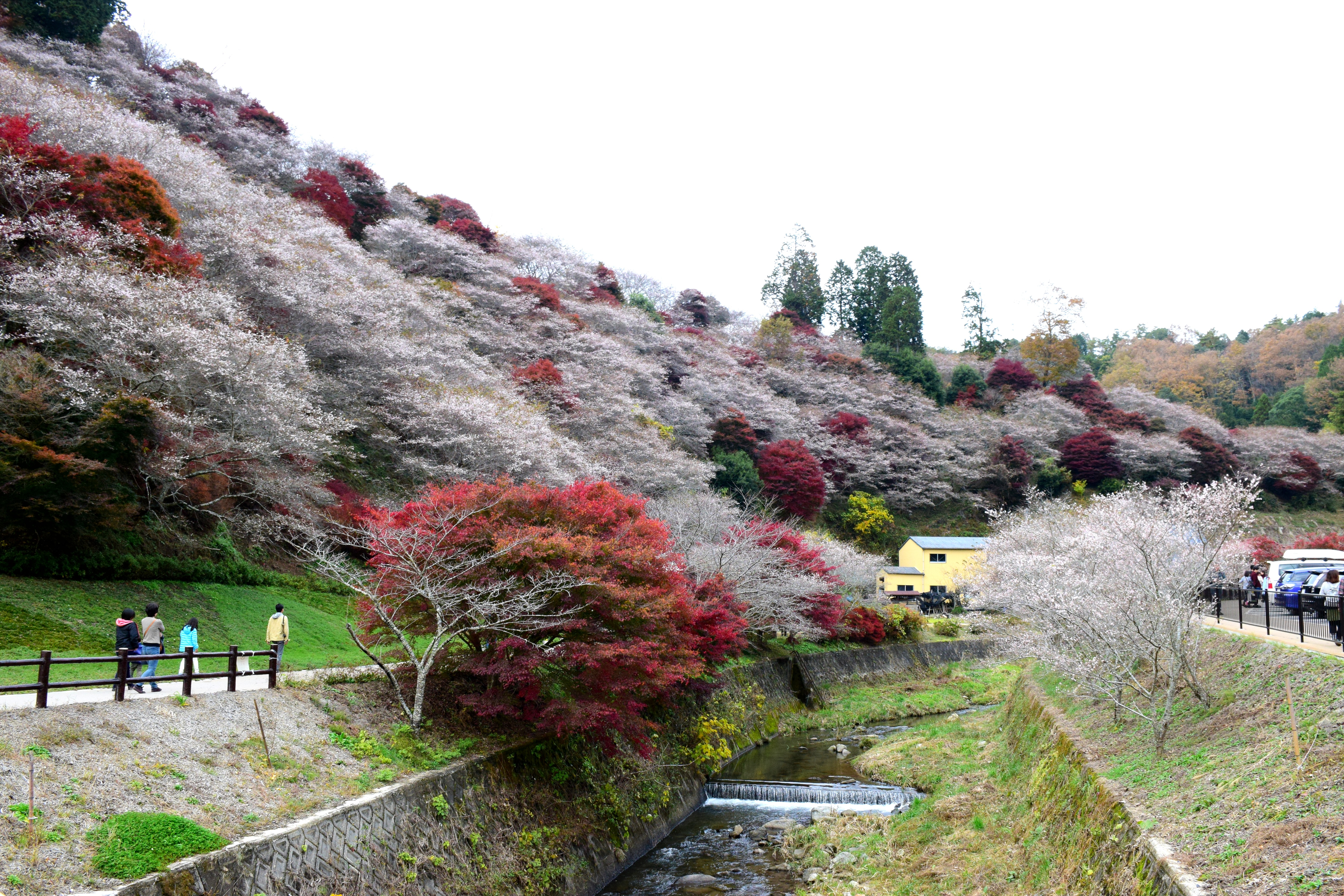
Obara shikizakura

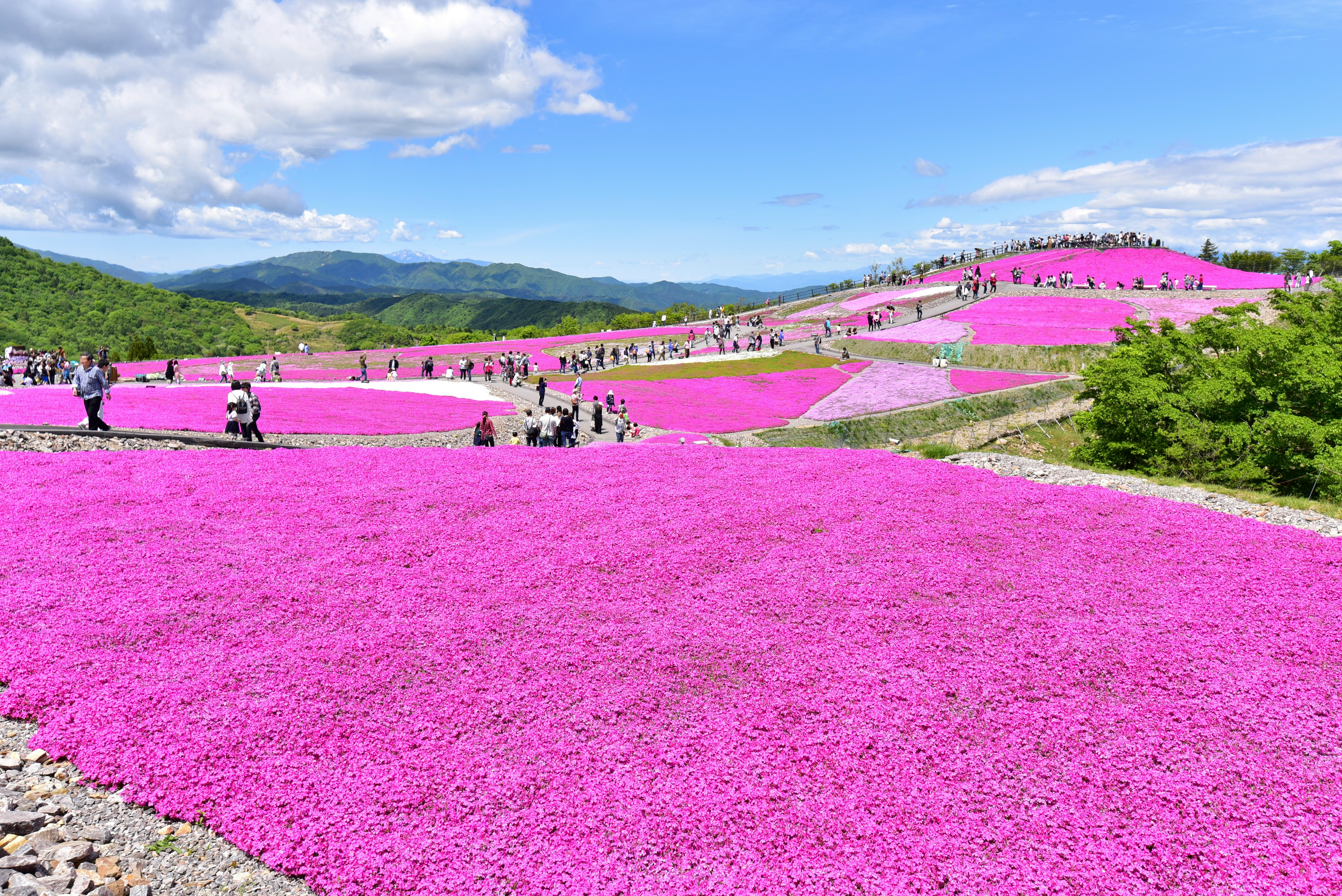
Chausuyama Plateau

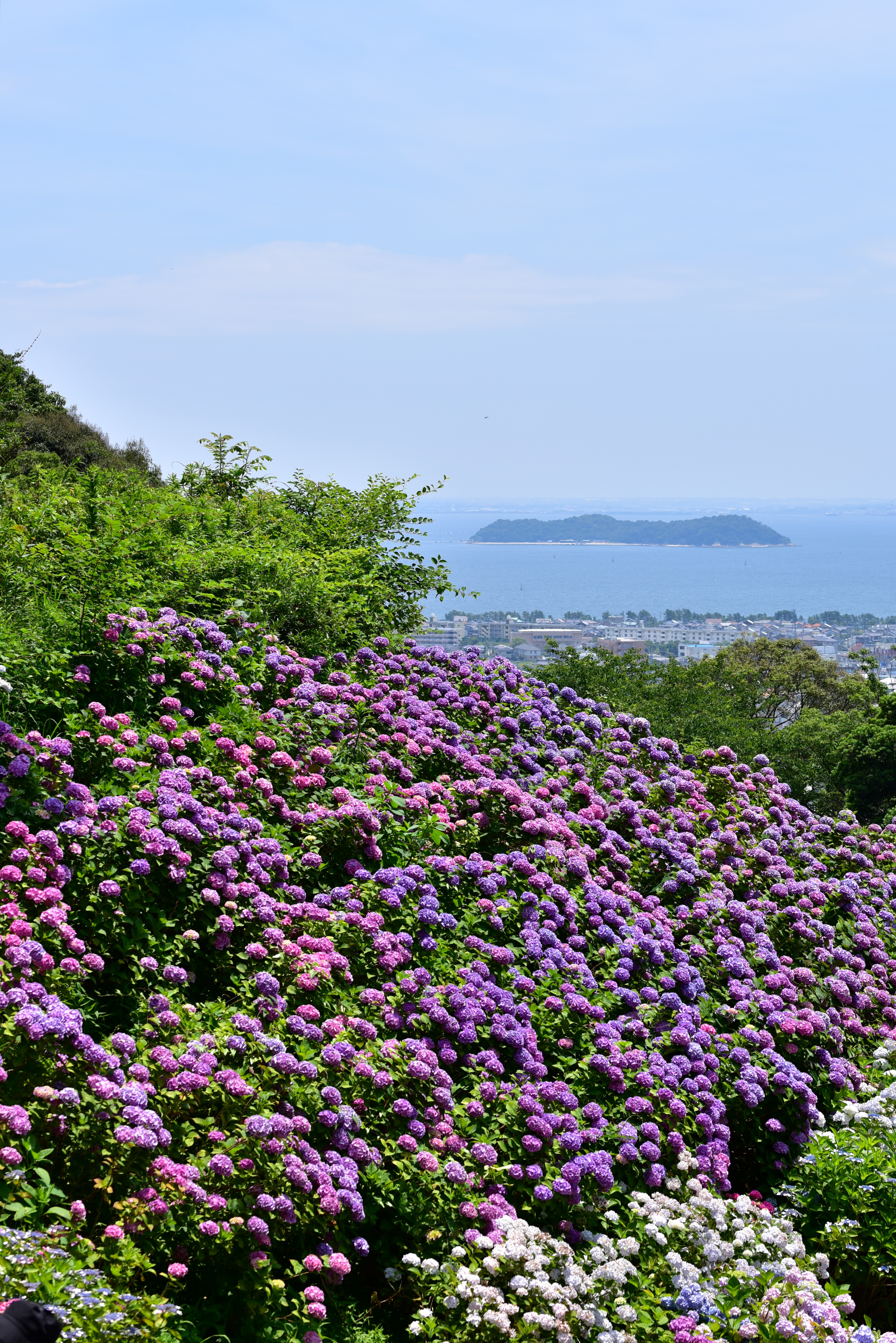
Katahara Onsen(Hydrangea Park)

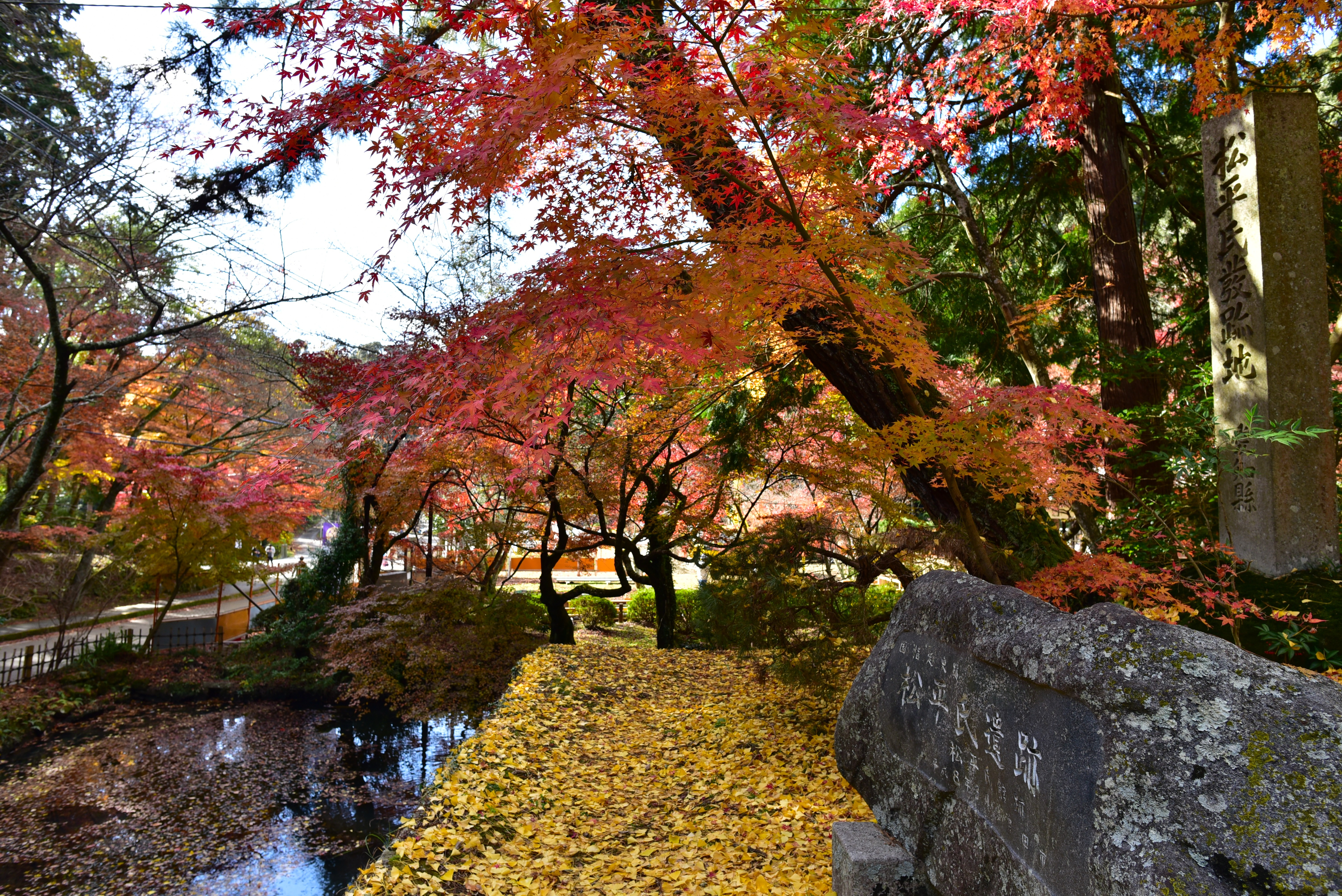
The ruins of Matsudaira

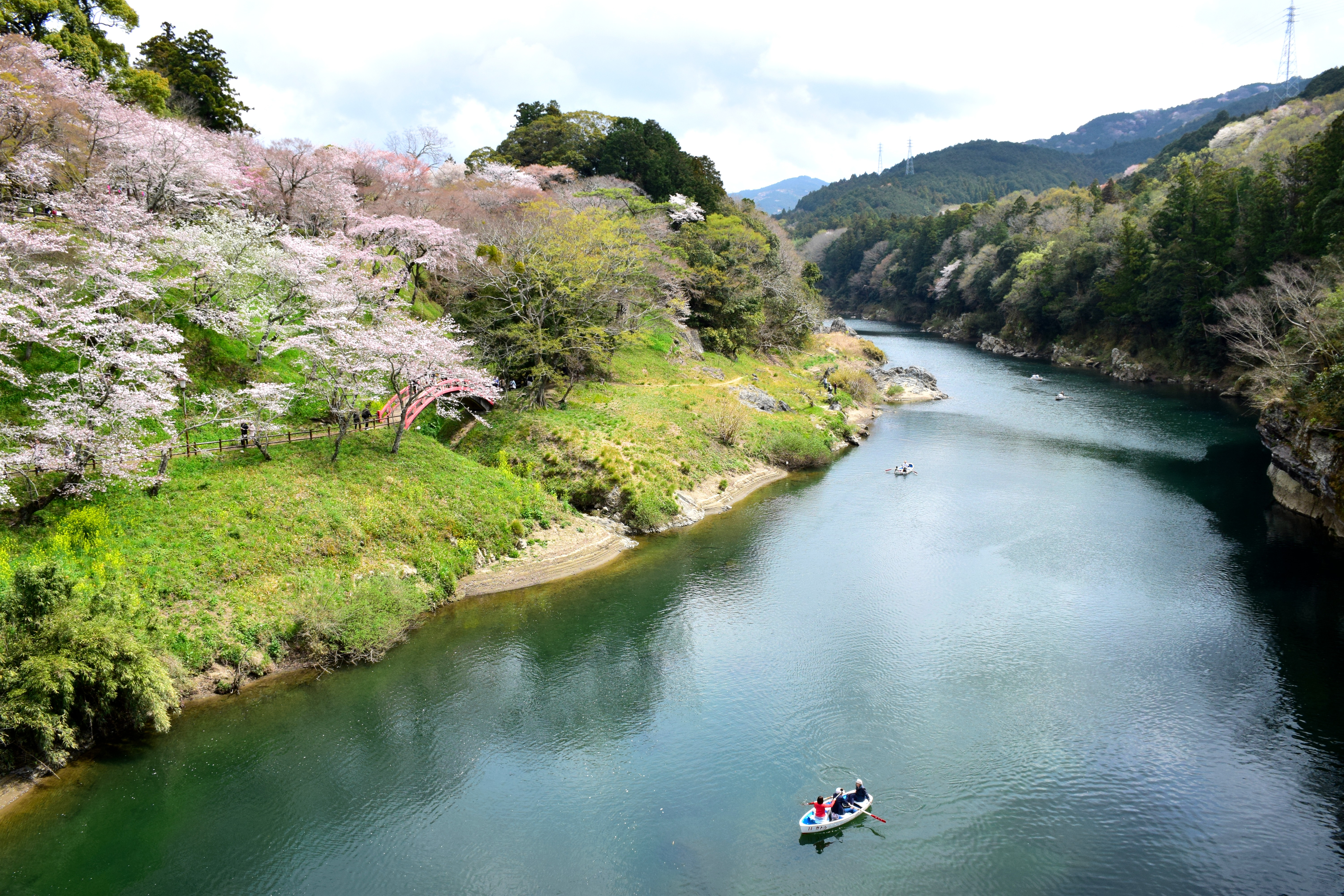
Sakurabuchi Park

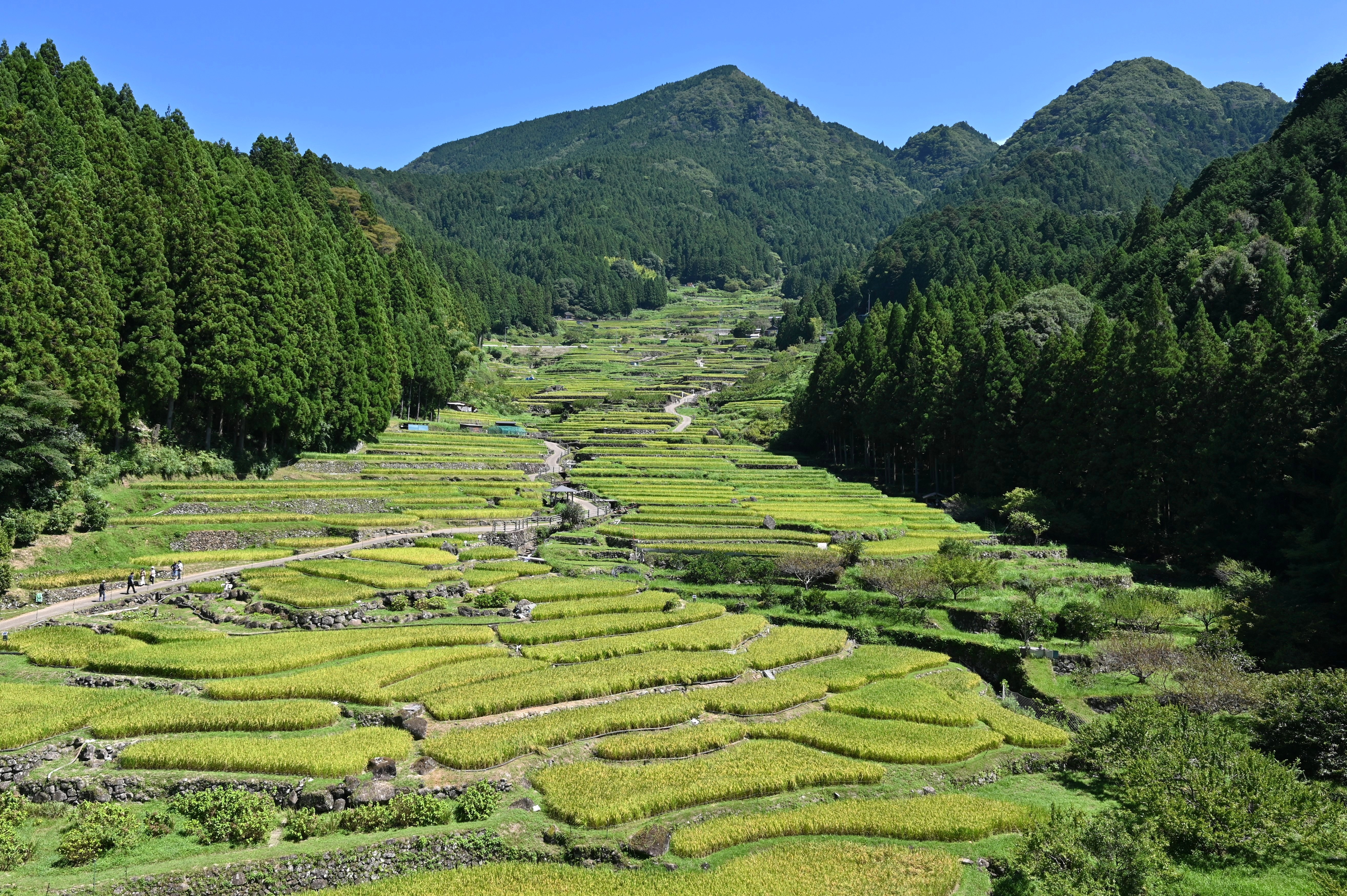
Thousand Rice Paddies of Yotsuya

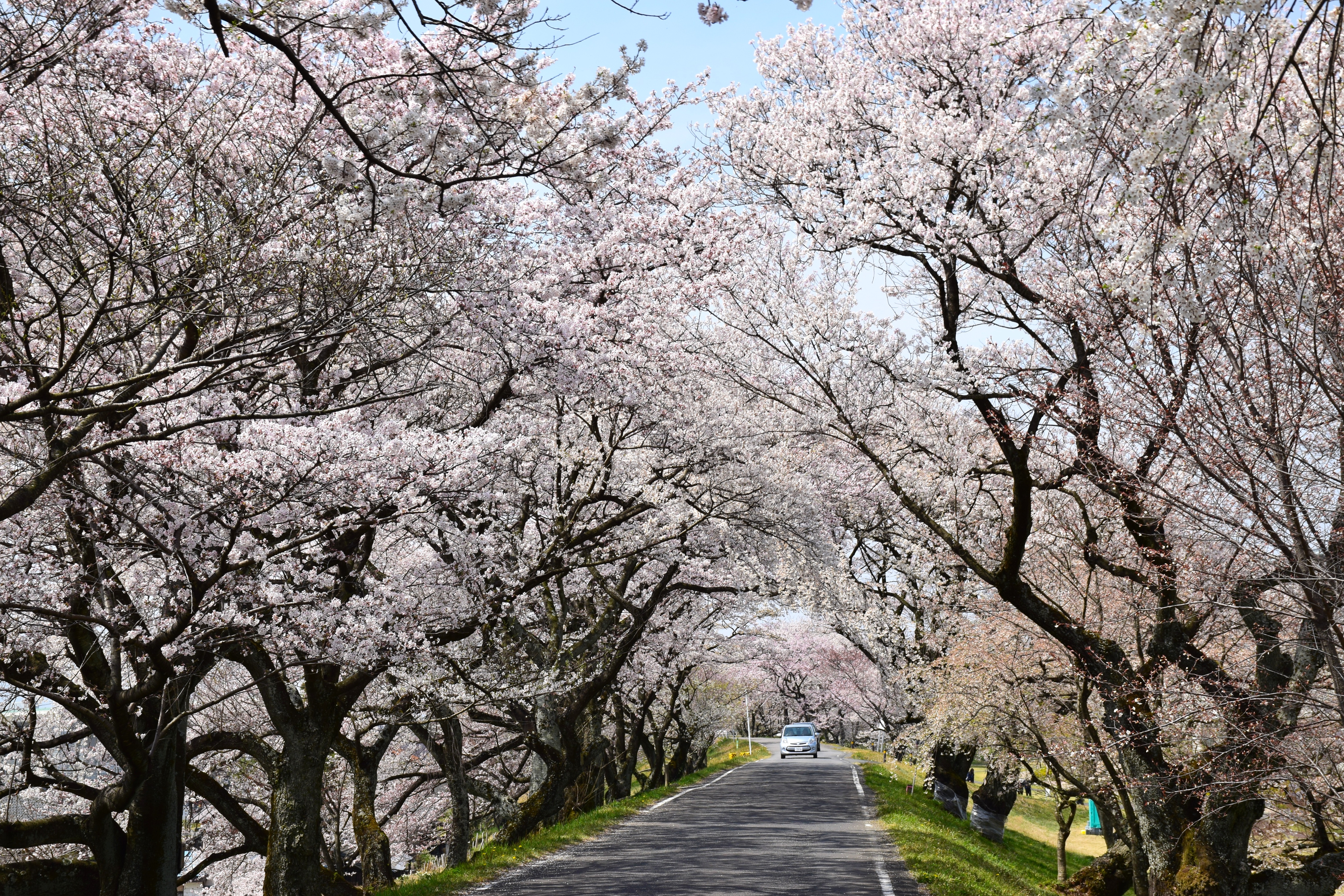
Kisogawazutsumi

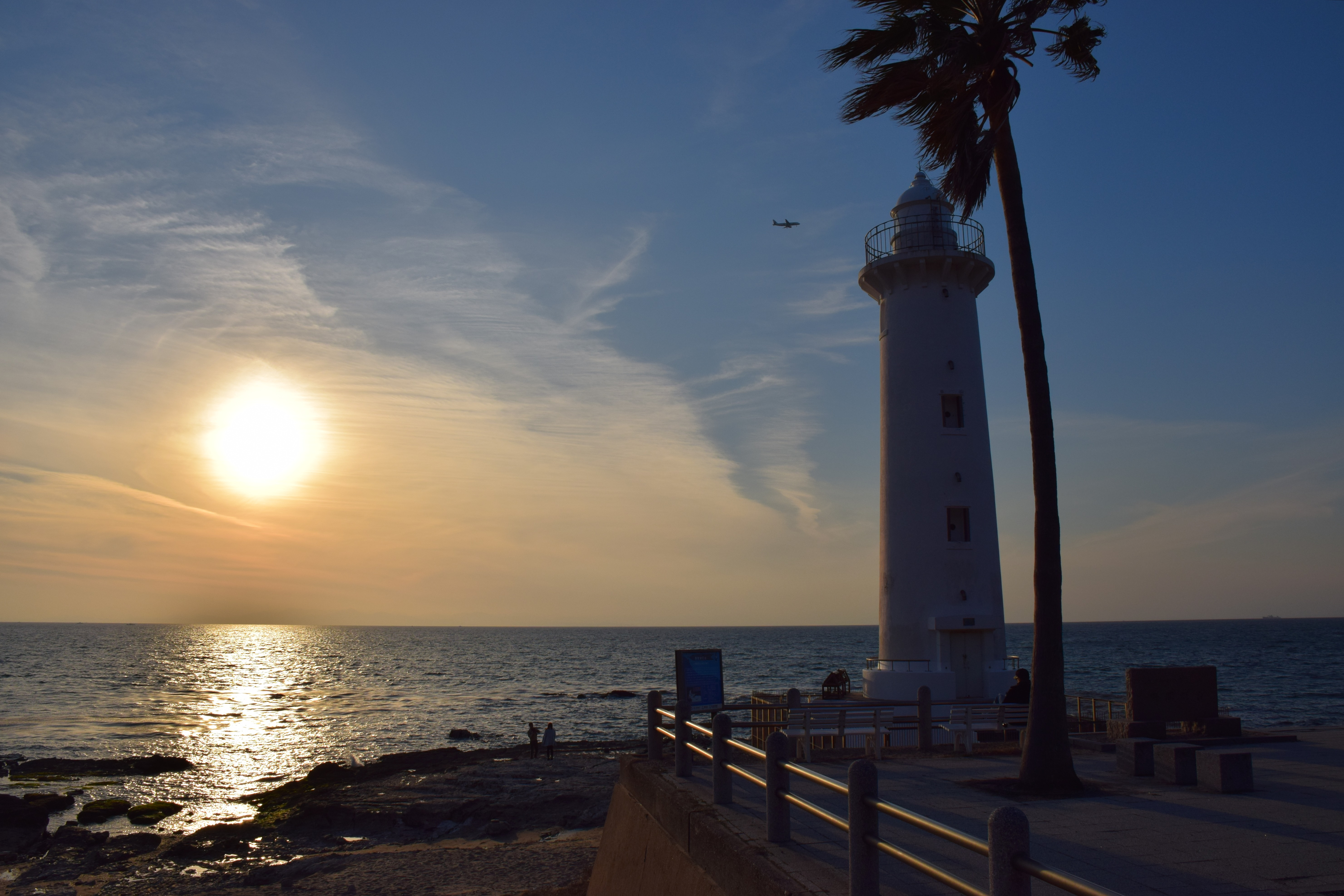
Nomazaki Lighthouse

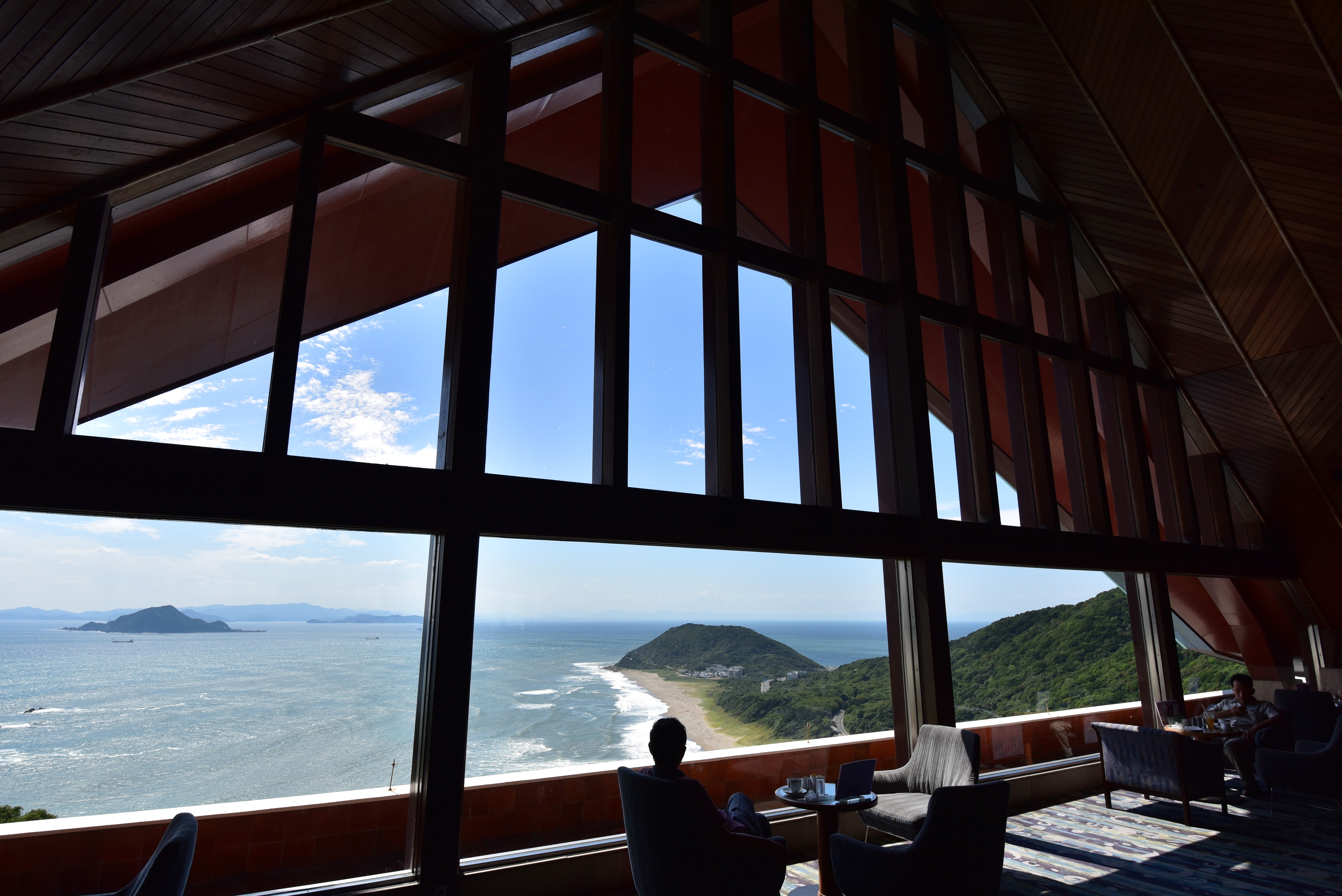
View of Cape Irago from Irago Ocean Resort

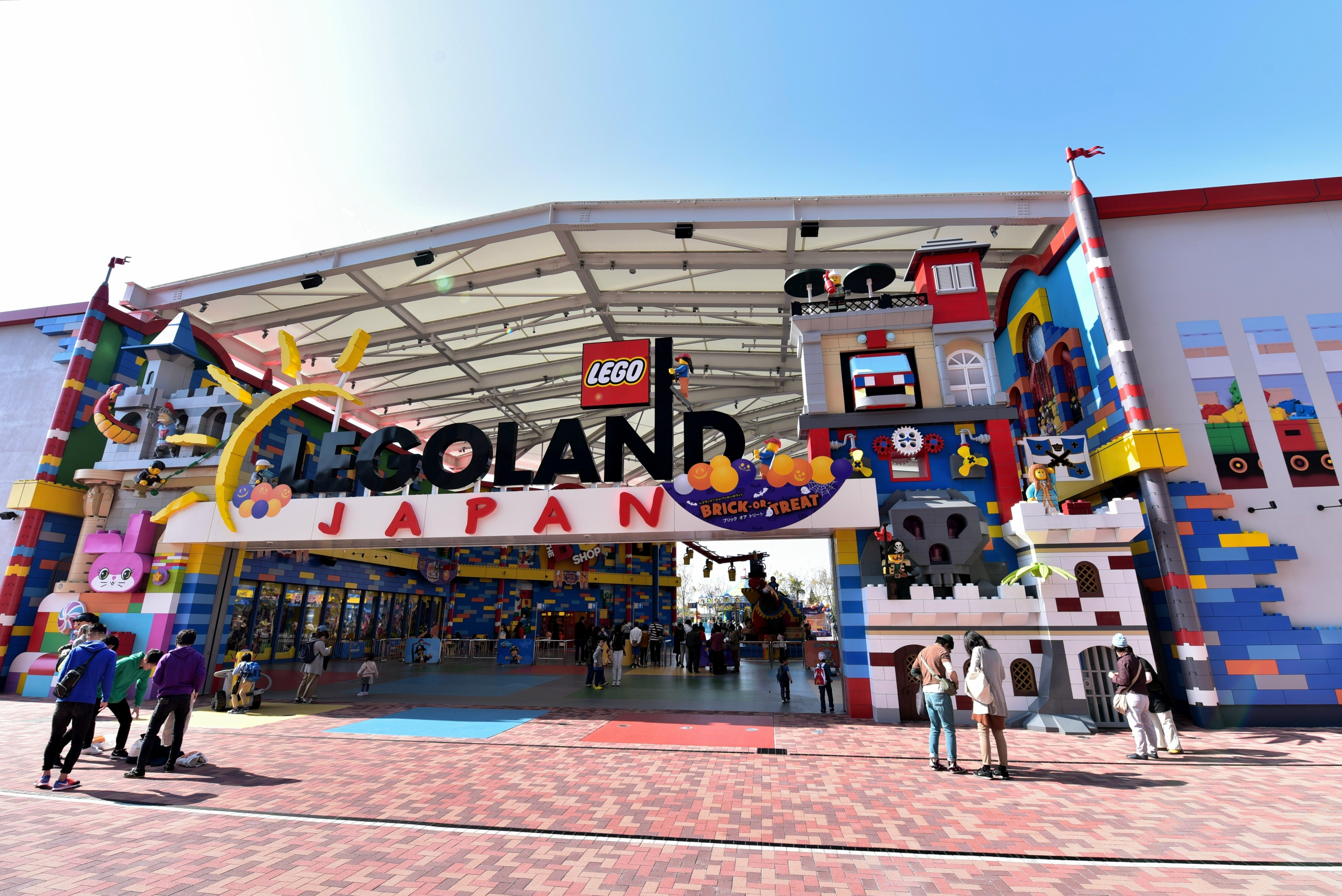
Legoland Japan

== Notable people from Aichi ==
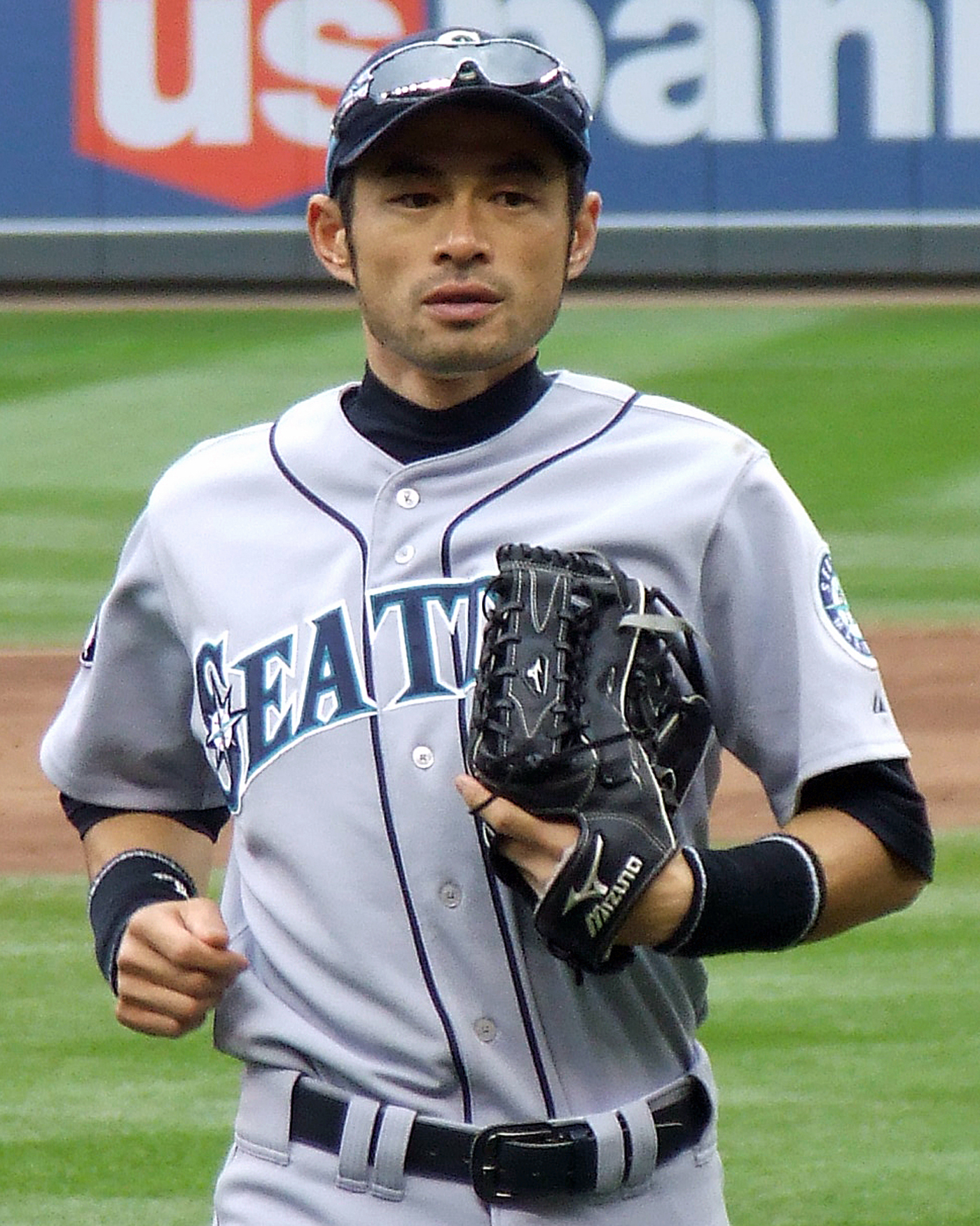
Ichiro Suzuki

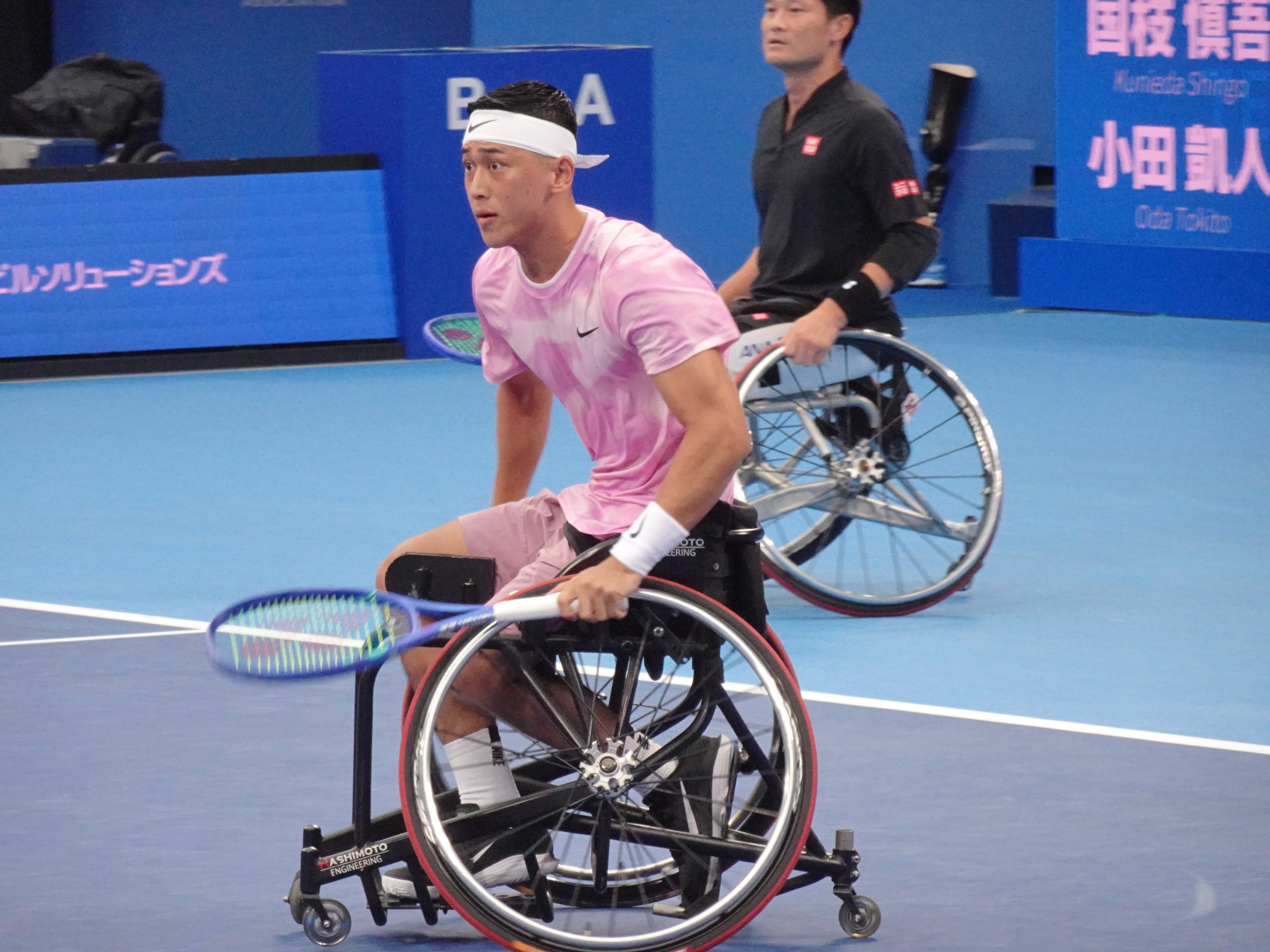
Tokito Oda

- Kato Cocoro (born 2000), singer, member of Me:I
- Mei Ehara, singer-songwriter, filmmaker, designer and artist.
- Suzuki Ichiro (born 1973), professional baseball player, member of Japan national baseball team, 2x time World Baseball Classic Champion and National Baseball Hall of Fame Inductee
- Yūki Ishikawa (石川祐希), professional volleyball player, Japan National Team, Power Volley Milano Italy Super Lega
- Tatsuya Kataoka (born 1975), racing driver
- Yoshiaki Katayama (born 1993), racing driver
- Sato Keigo (born 1998), singer, member of JO1
- F Chopper Koga (Japanese: FチョッパーKOGA, romanized: Efu Choppā Koga), bass player and leader of the rock band Gacharic Spin
- Koji Kondo (born 1961), composer and pianist born in Nagoya who works on video game soundtracks for Nintendo
- Maria Makino, idol singer and member of Morning Musume
- Kimura Masaya (born 1997), singer, dancer, member of INI (Japanese boy group)
- Sakurai Miu (born 2002), singer, member of Me:I
- Aoi Morikawa (born 1995), actress and model
- Rei Naoi (born 2004), member of IVE
- Tokito Oda (born 2006), champion wheelchair tennis player
- Kazuchika Okada (born 1987), professional wrestler from Anjō
- Haruna Ono (musician), lead vocals and rhythm guitarist for the rock band Scandal
- Takahiro Sakurai (born 1974), actor, narrator and radio personality
- Mami Sasazaki (musician), lead guitar and vocalist for the rock band Scandal
- Kimata Syoya (born 2000), singer, member of JO1
- Akira Toriyama (1955–2024), manga artist and character designer from Kiyosu
- Yuki Yamada (born 1990), actor
- Kansuke Yamamoto (1914–1987), avant-garde photographer and poet from Nagoya
- Syoh Yoshida (born 1984), artist

== Festival and events ==
UNESCO Intangible Cultural Heritage

- Owari Tsushima Tenno Matsuri (Aisai, Tsushima)
- Inuyama Festival (Inuyama)
- Kamezaki Shiohi Festival (Handa)
- Chiryu Festival (Chiryū)
- Sunari Festival (Ama District Kanie)
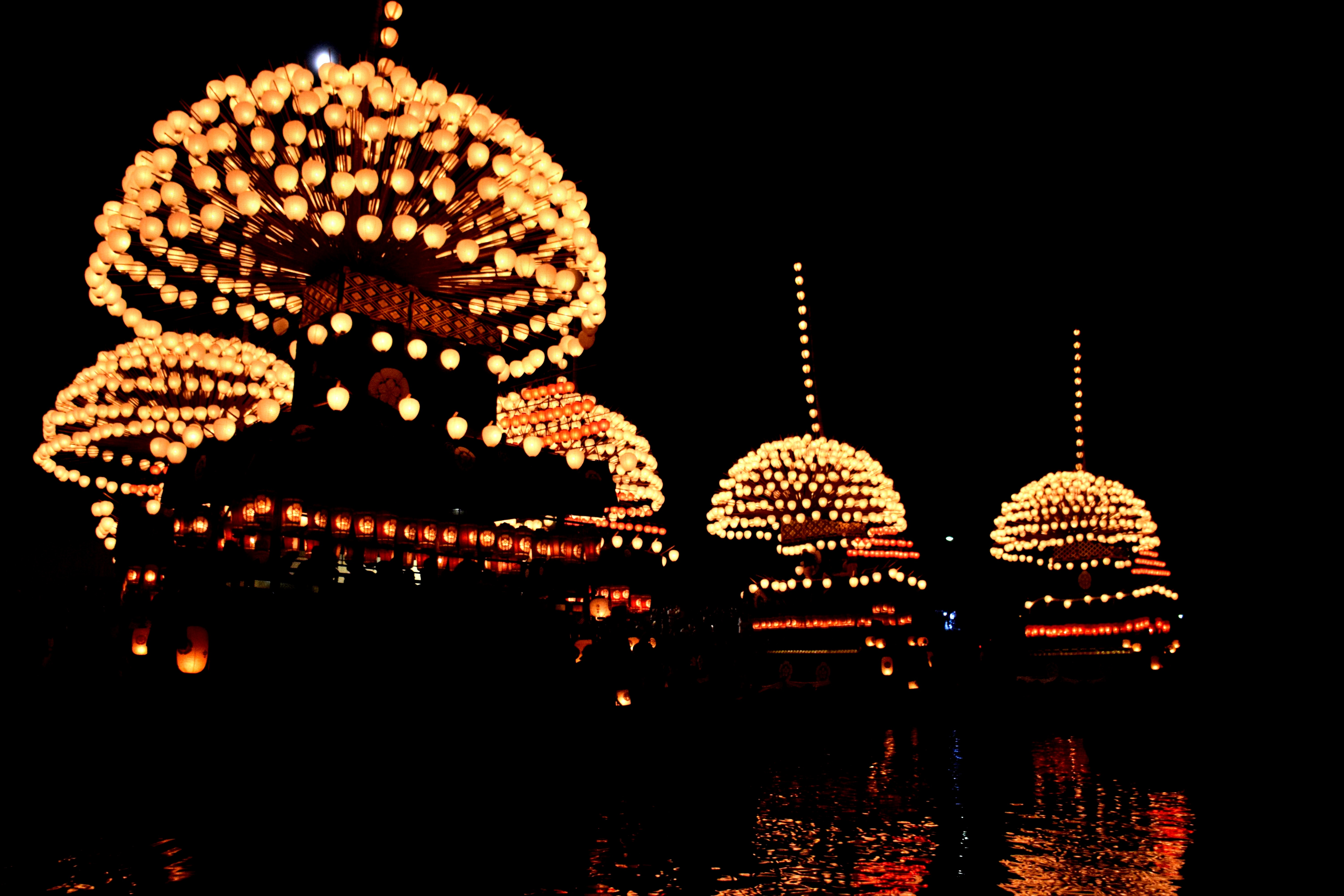
Owari Tsushima Tennōsai (eve)

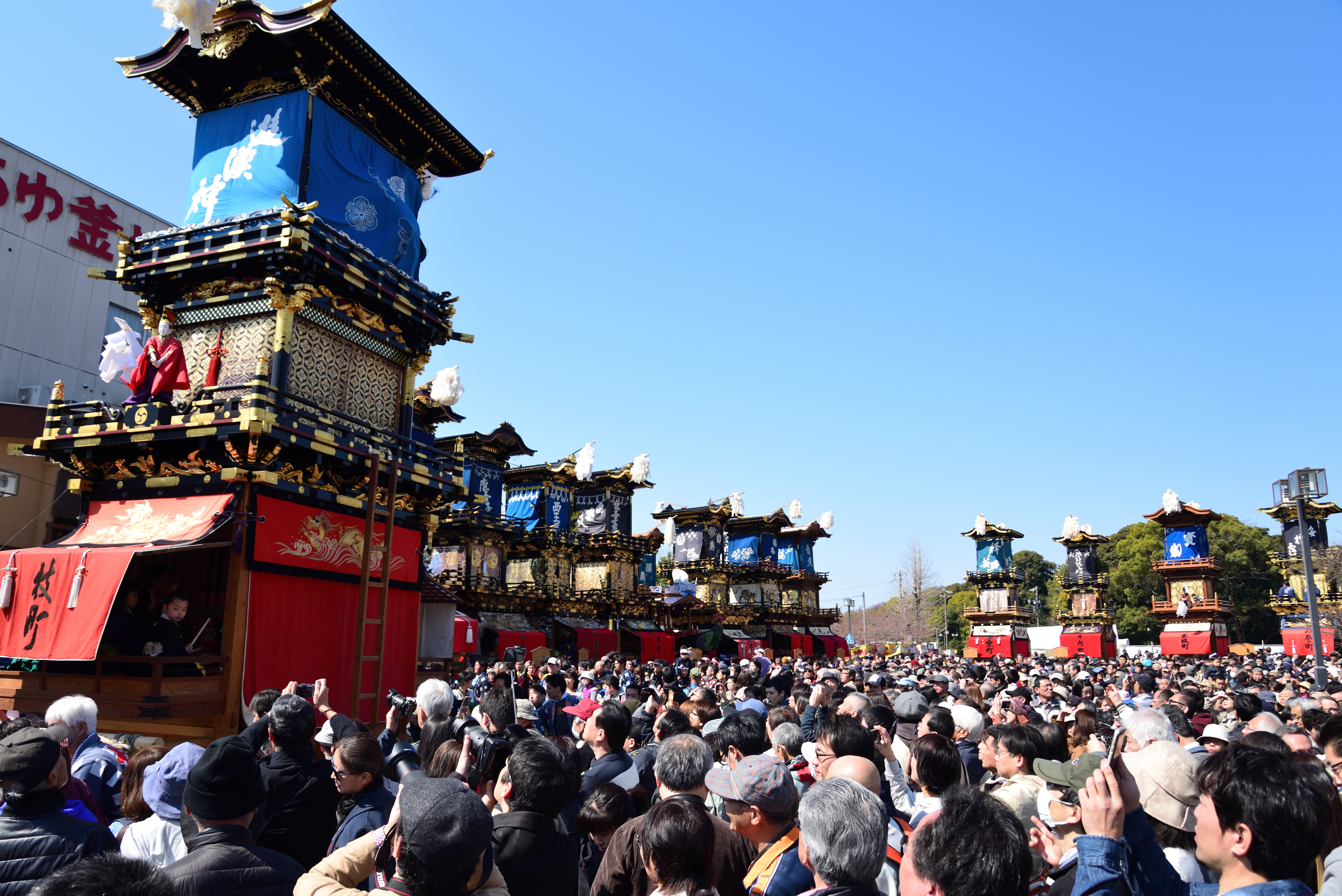
Inuyama Festival

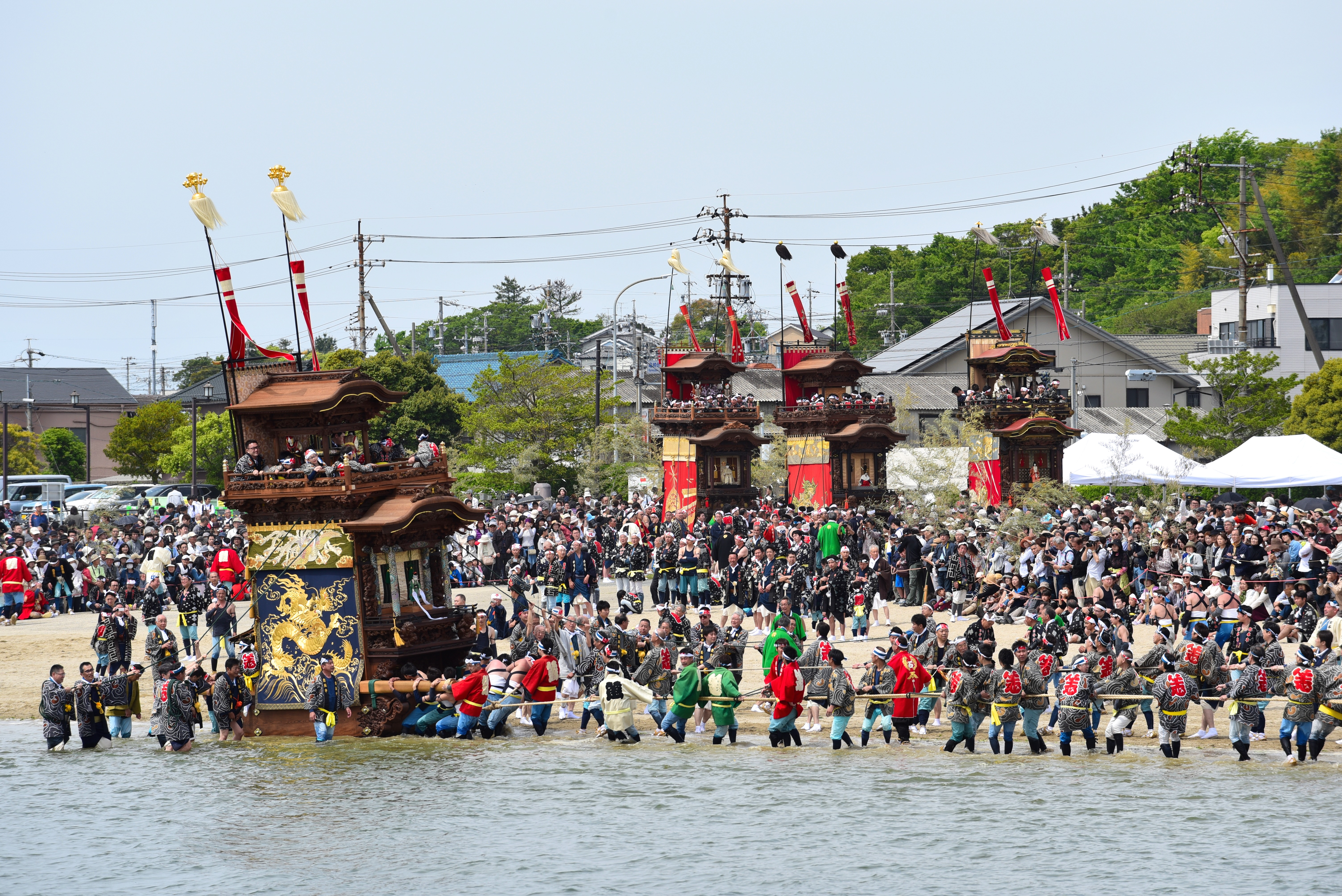
Kamezaki Shiohi Festival

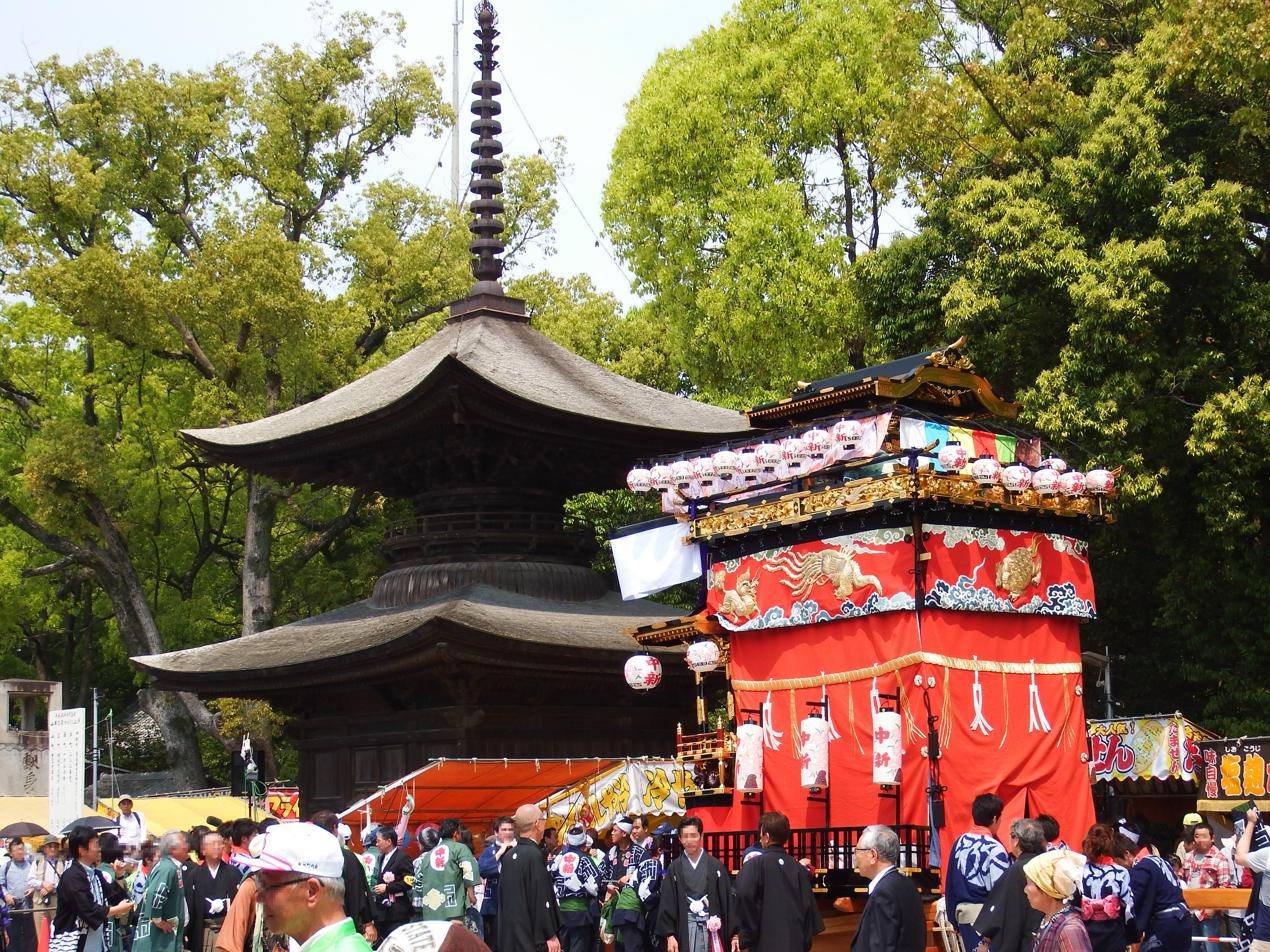
Chiryu Festival

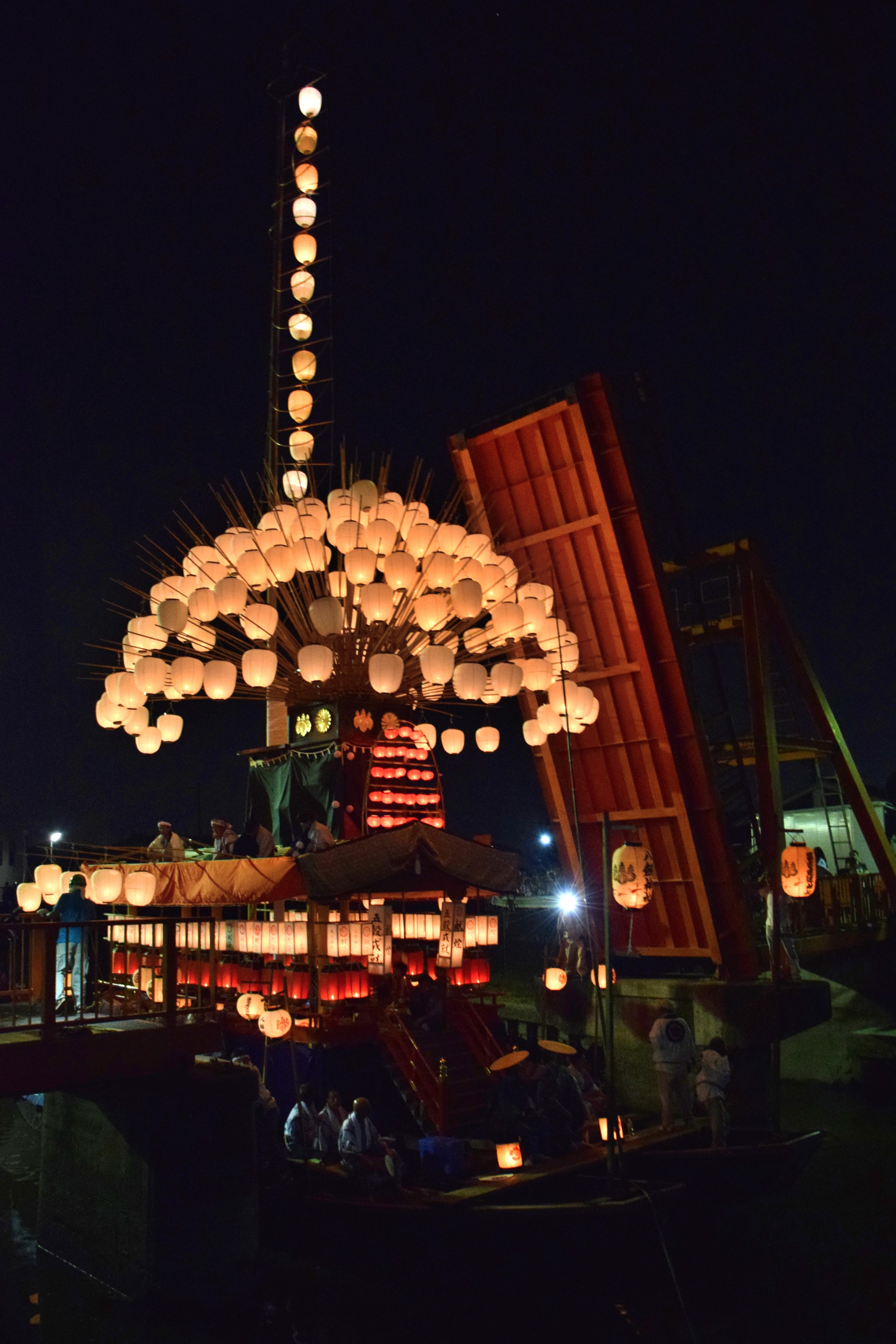
Sunari Festival

Others

- Nagoya Festival (Nagoya City)
- Tsutsui-chō/Dekimachi Tennō Festival (Nagoya Higashi-ku)
- Miya Festival (Gamagōri)
- Toyohama Sea bream Festival (Chita District Minamichita Town)
- Okkawa Festival (Handa)
- Hōnen Matsuri (Komaki)
- Omanto festival (Takahama)
- Kōnomiya Hadaka Matsuri (Inazawa)
- Tezutsu Matsuri (Toyohashi, Toyokawa)
- Nagashino festival (Shinshiro)
- Mando festival (Kariya)
- Isshiki Lantern Festival (Nishio)
- Toba Fire Festival (Nishio)
- Owari Tsushima Autumn Festival (Tsushima)
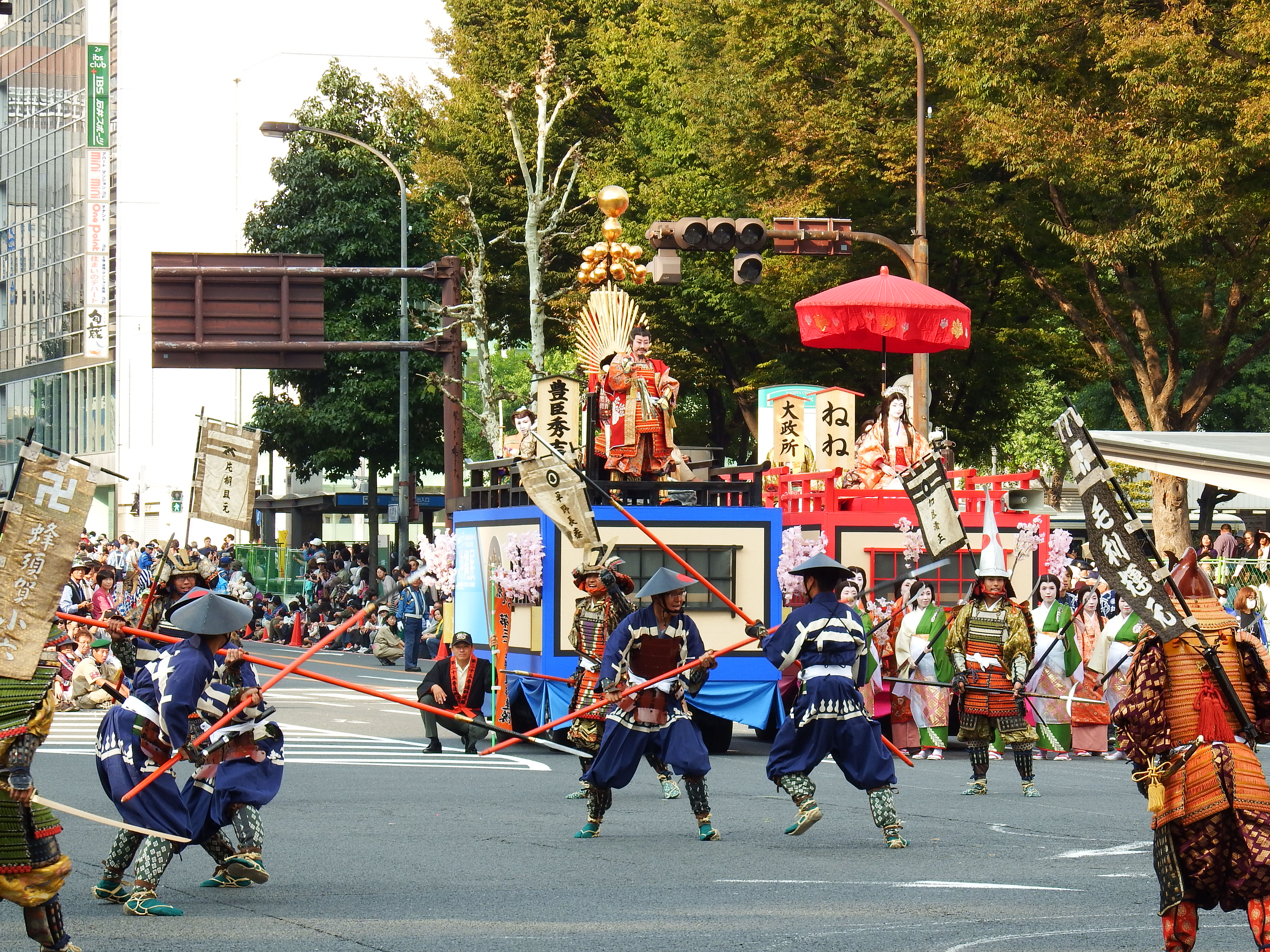
Nagoya Festival

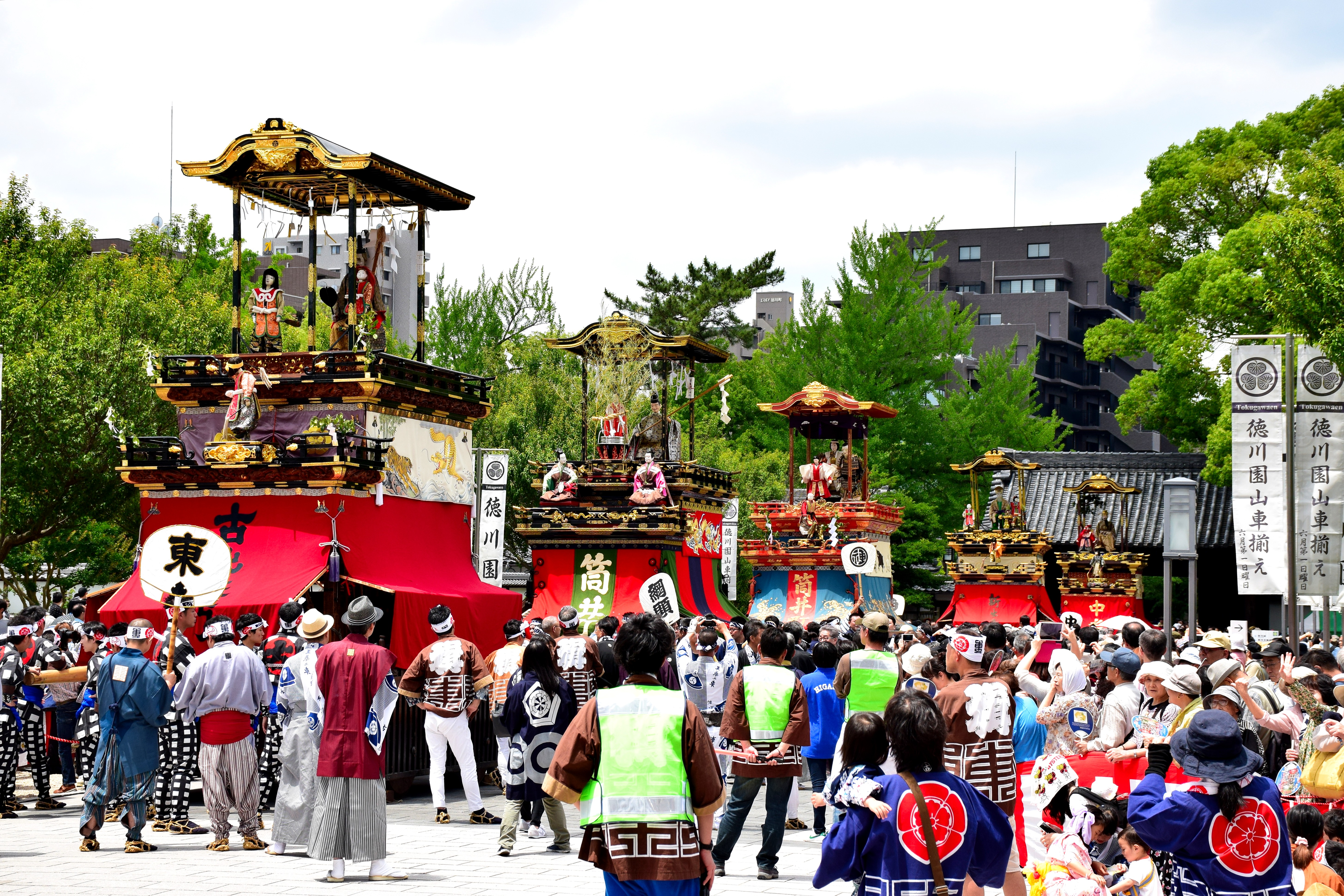
Tsutsui-chō/Dekimachi Tennō Festival

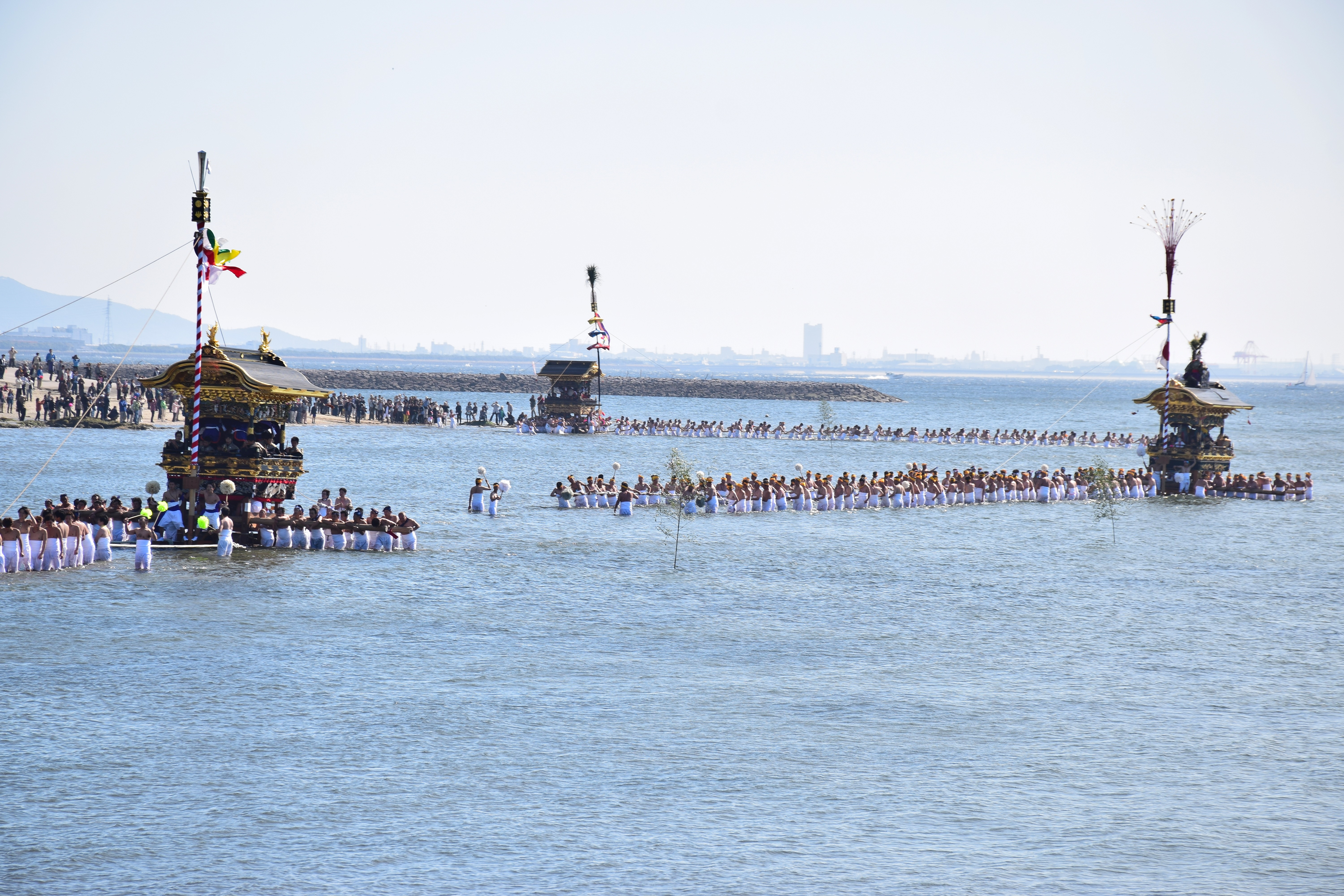
Miya Festival

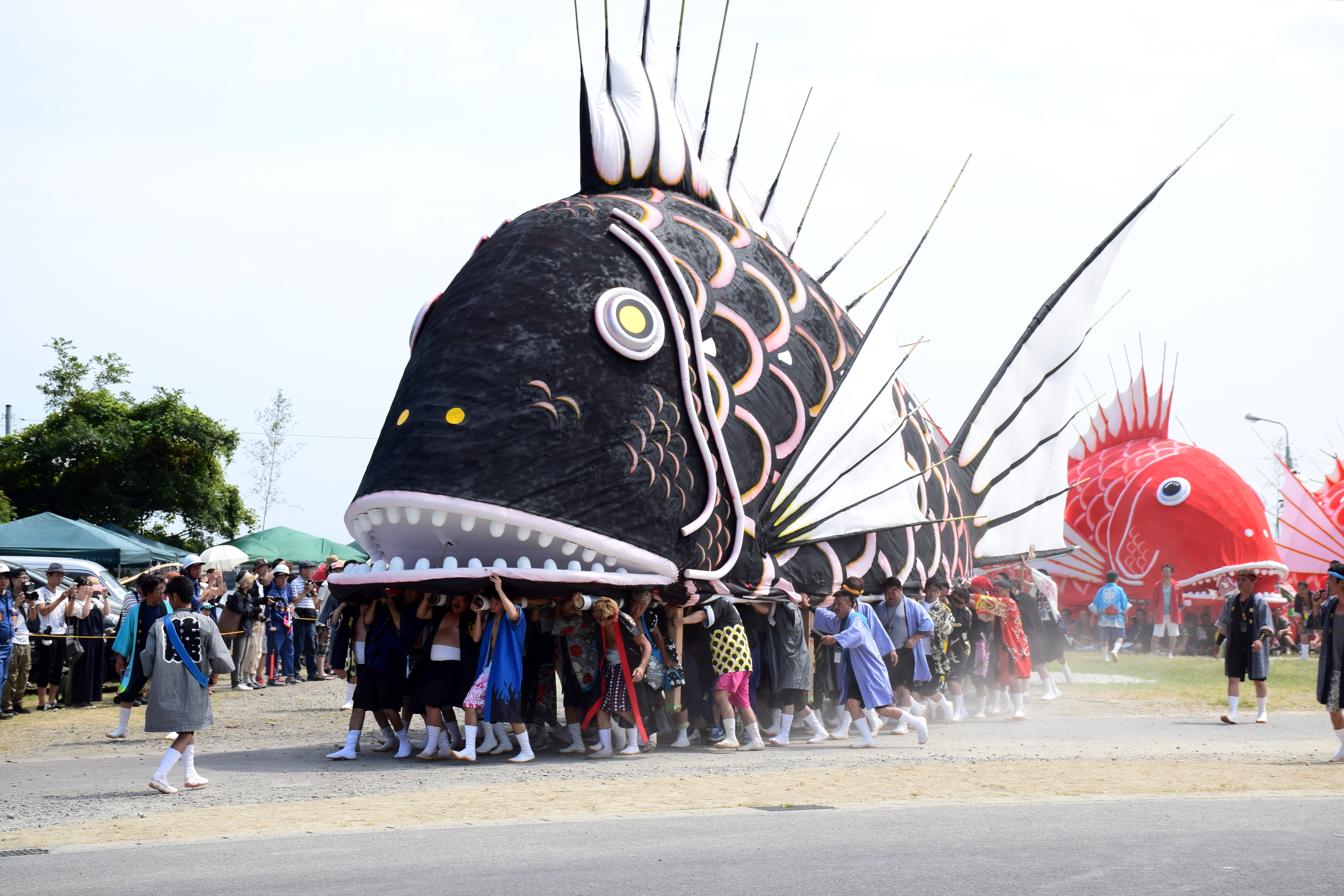
Toyohama Sea bream Festival

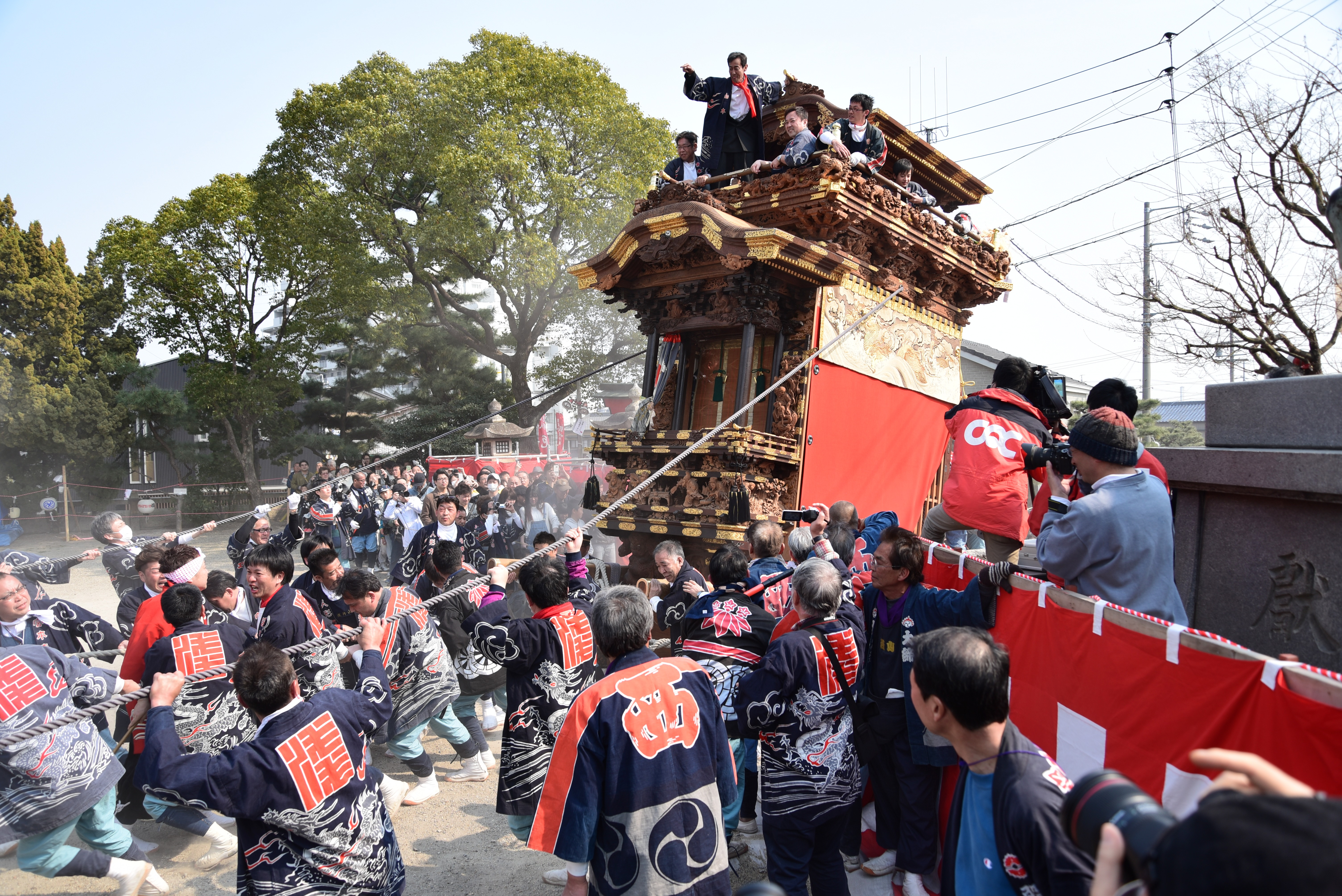
Okkawa Festival

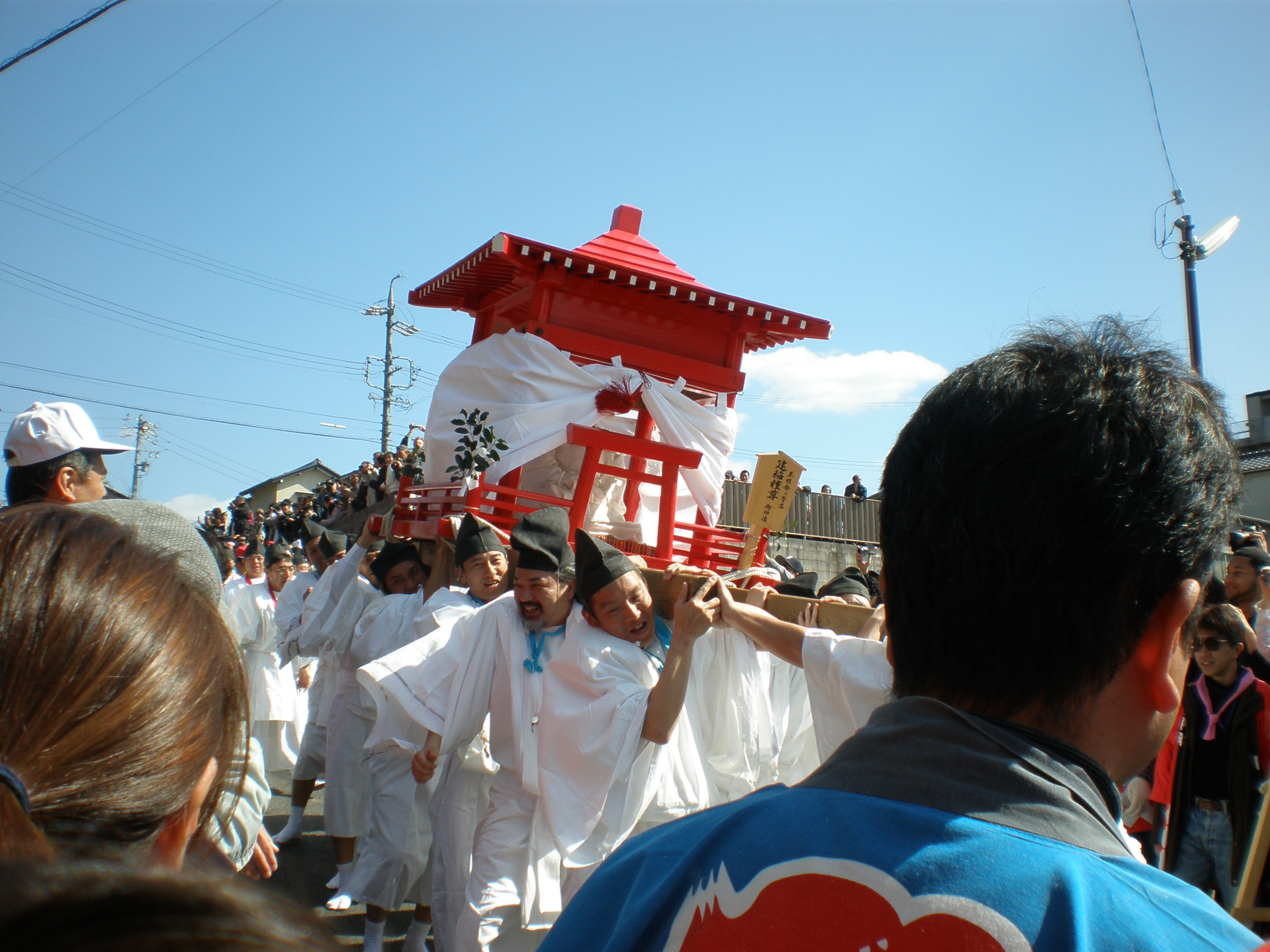
Hōnen Matsuri

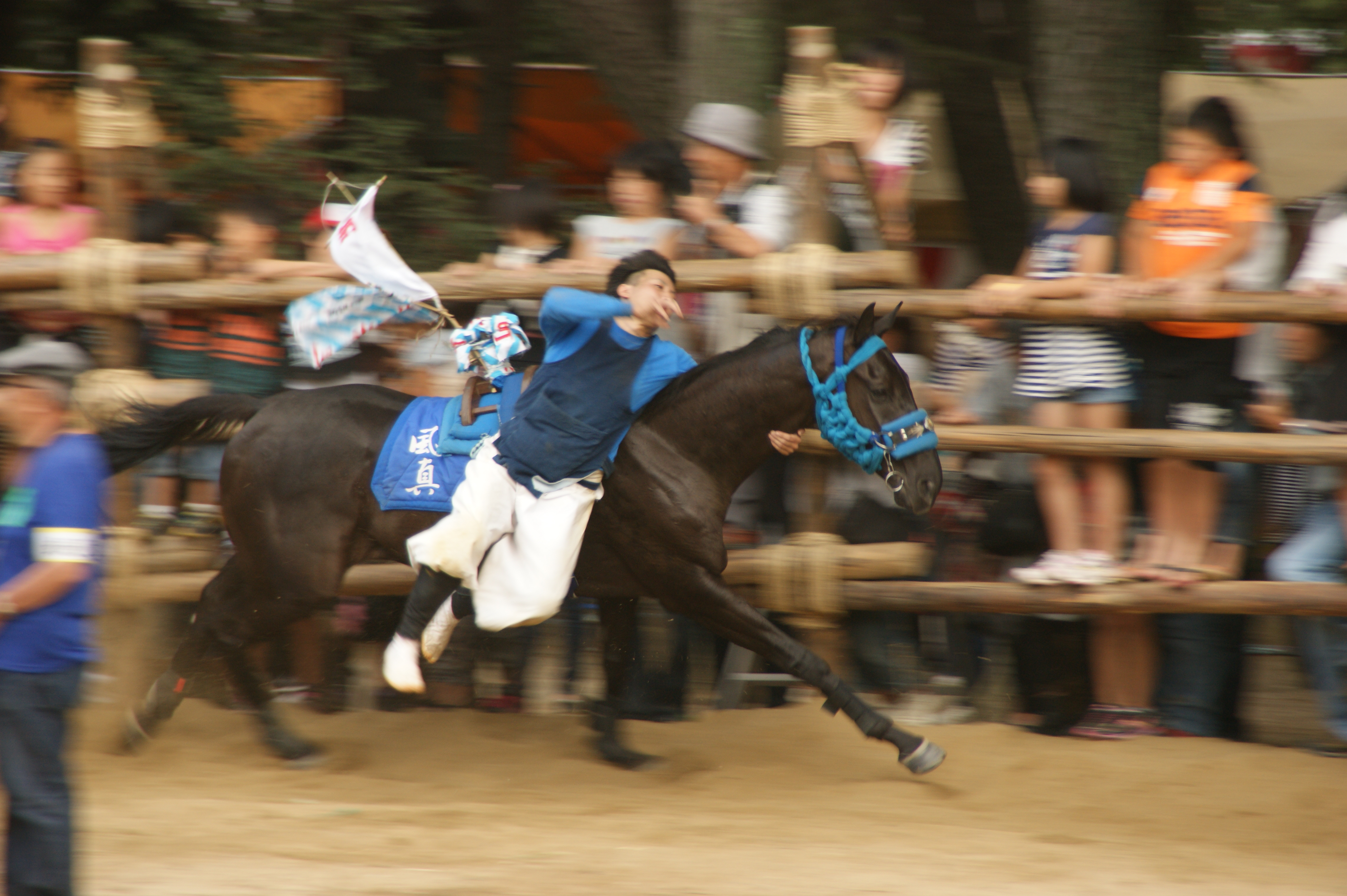
Omanto festival

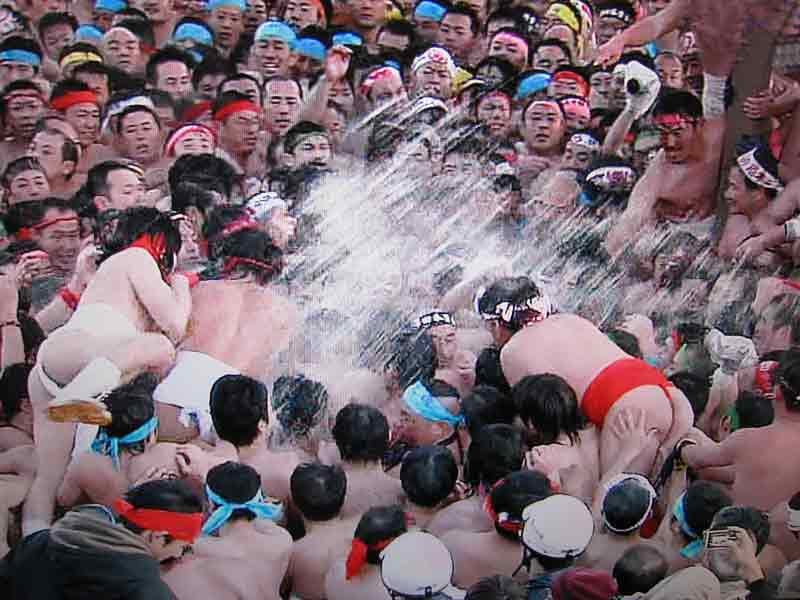
Kōnomiya Hadaka Matsuri

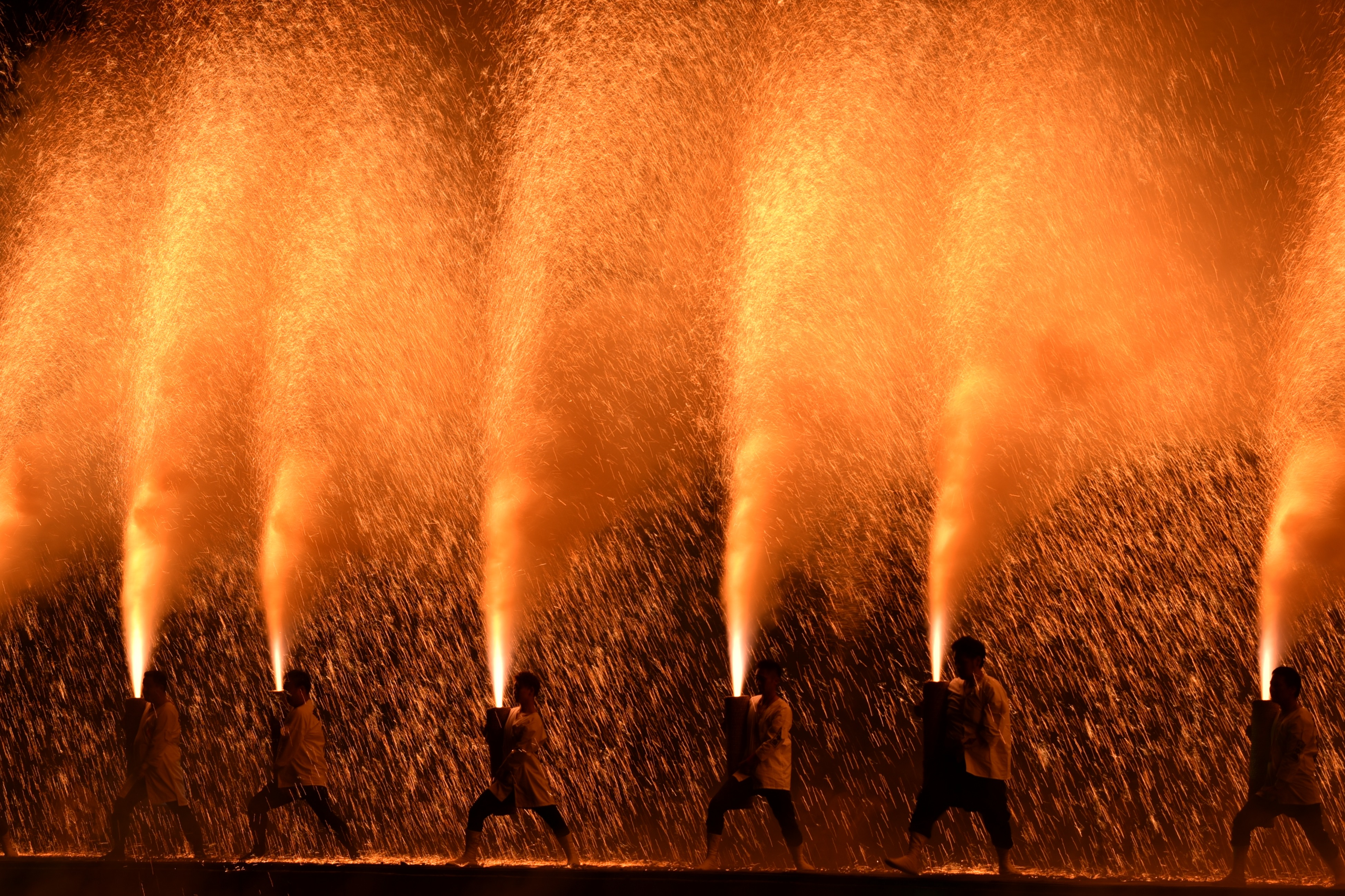
Toyokawa Tezutsu Matsuri

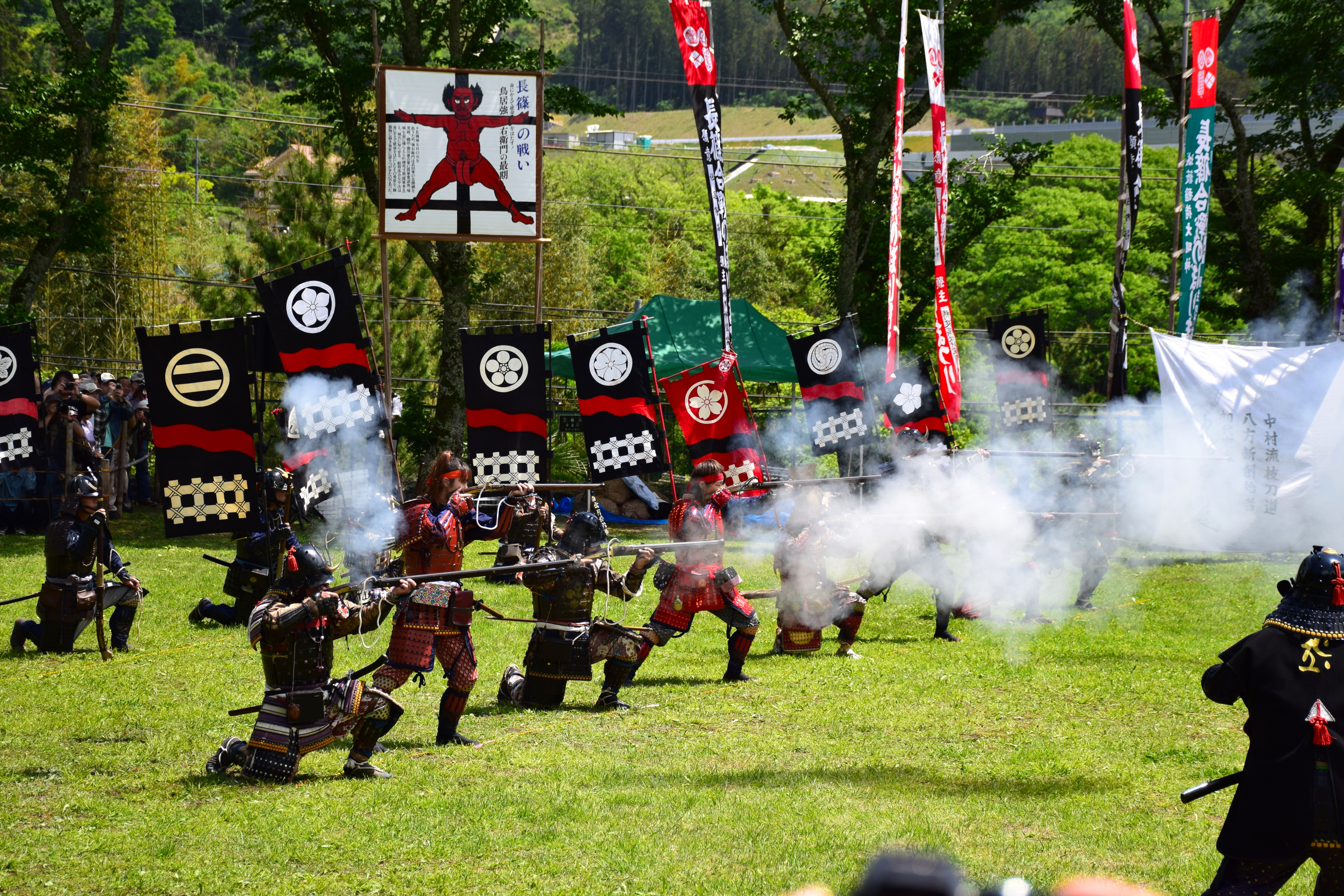
Nagashino festival

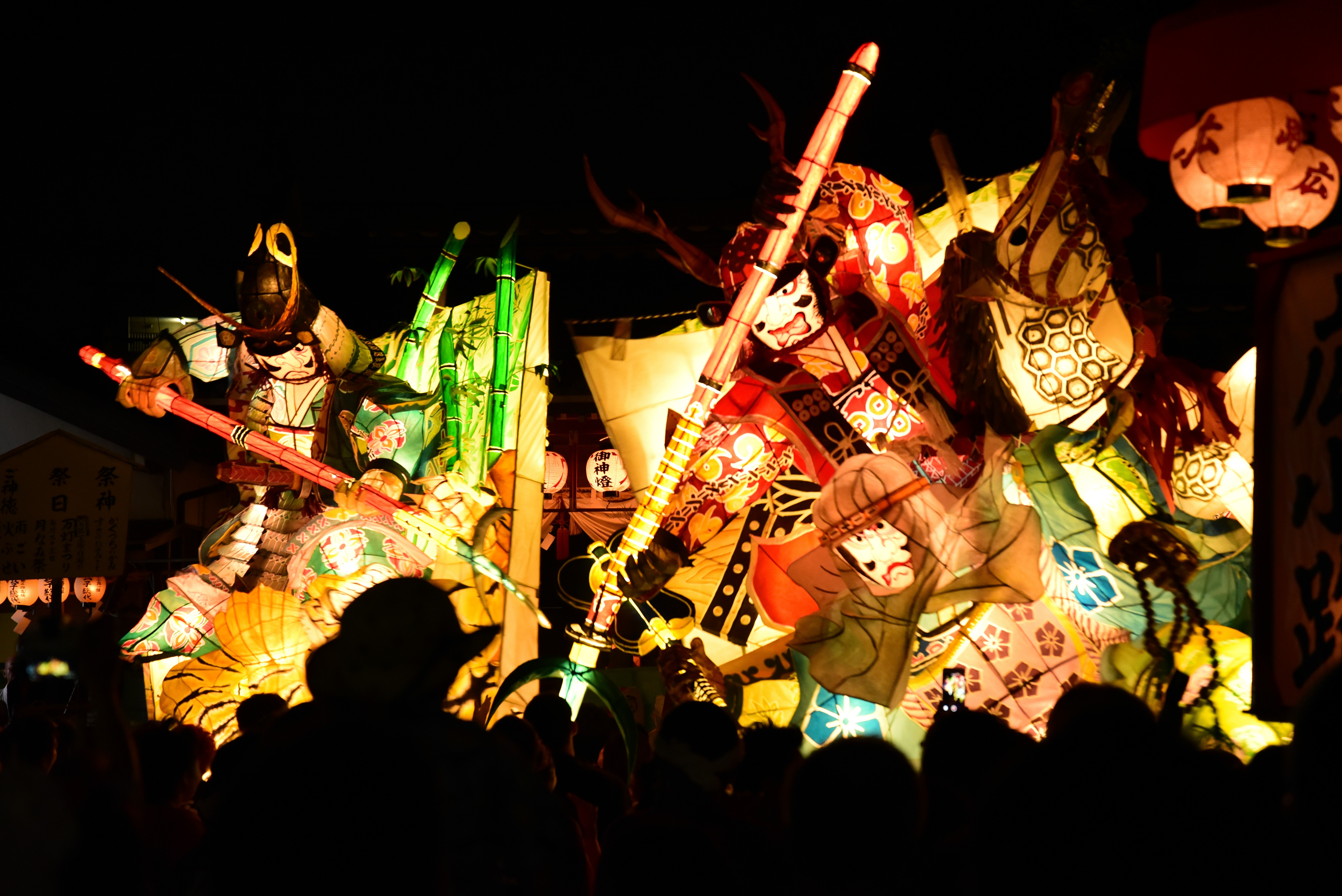
Mando festival

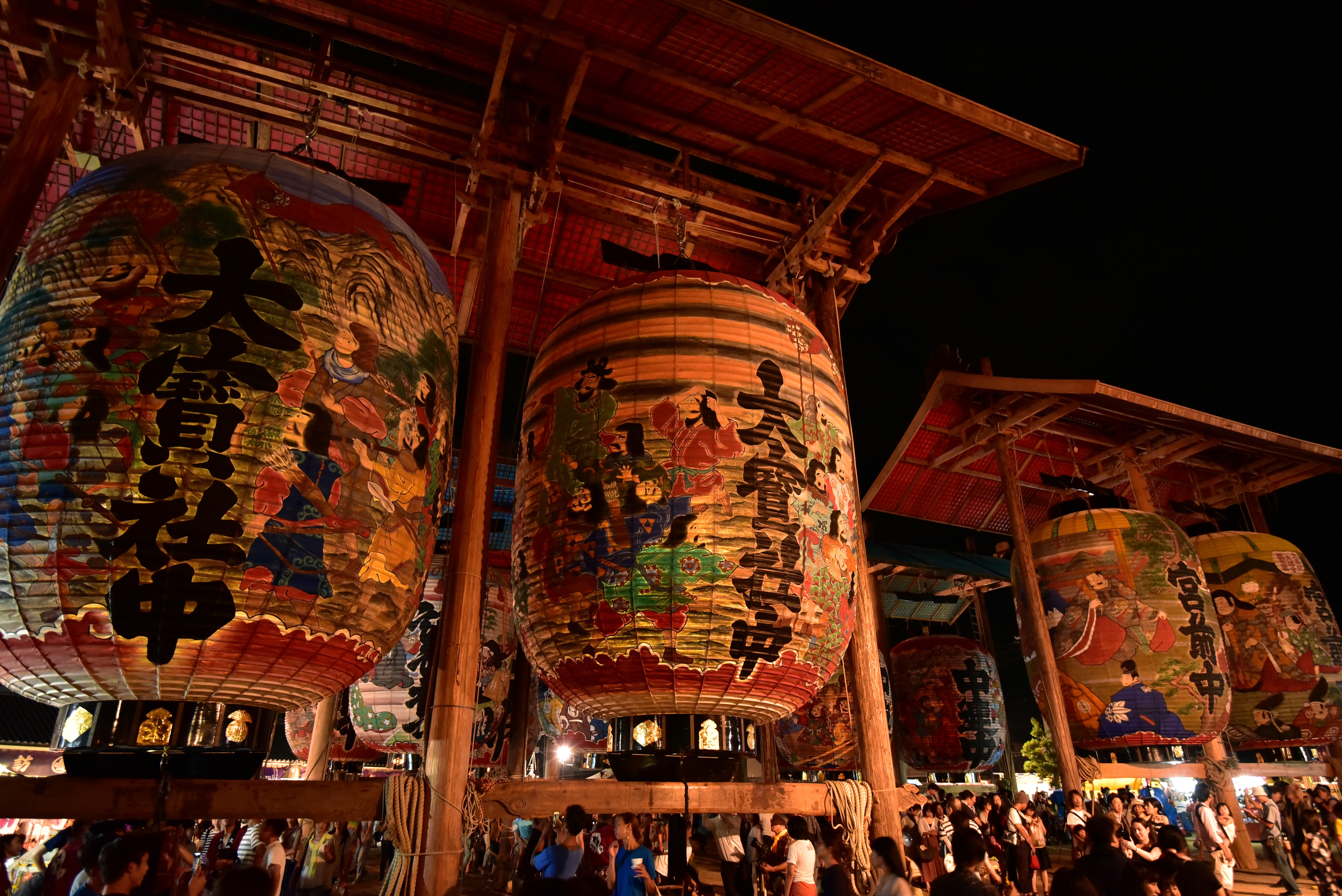
Isshiki Lantern Festival

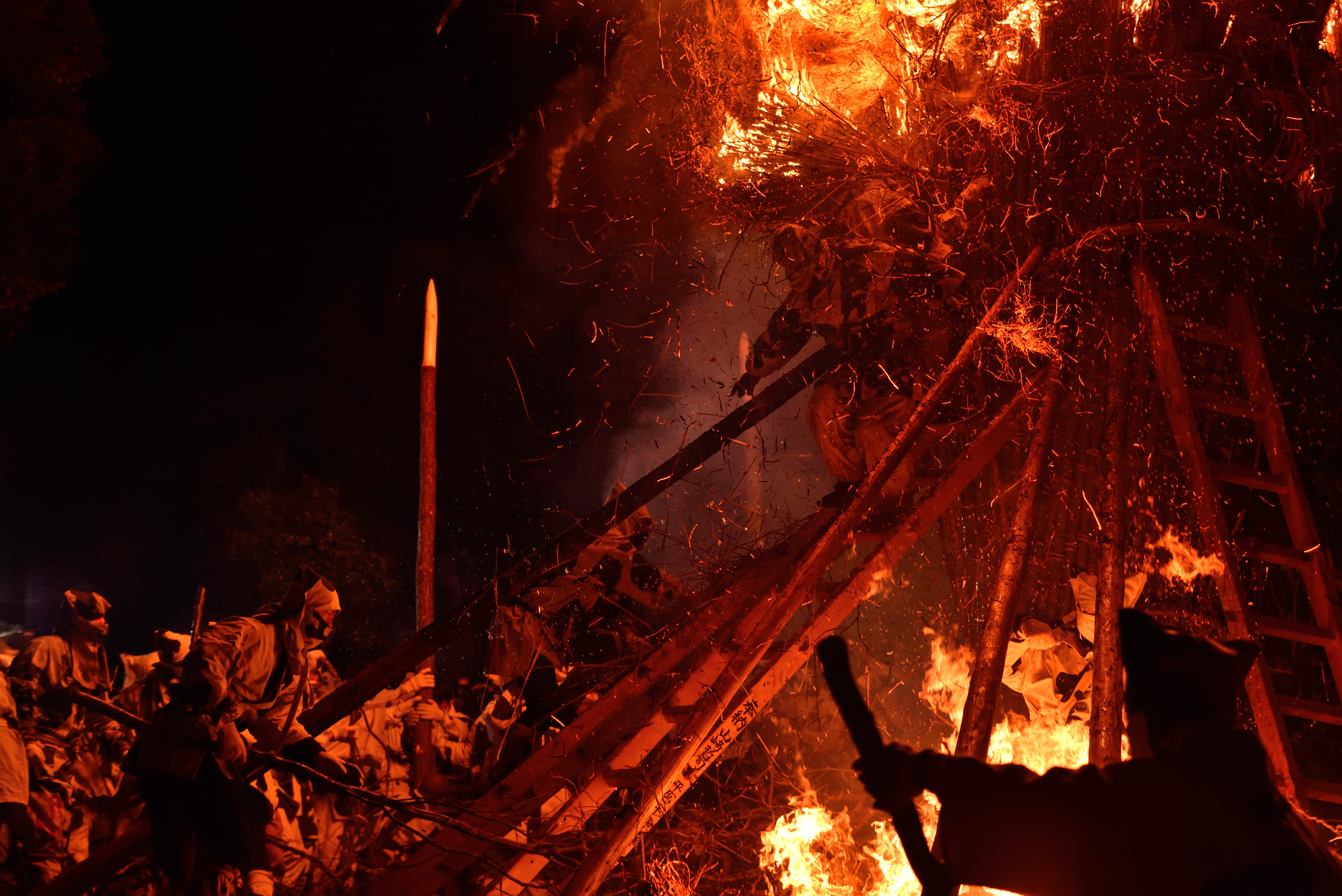
Toba Fire Festival

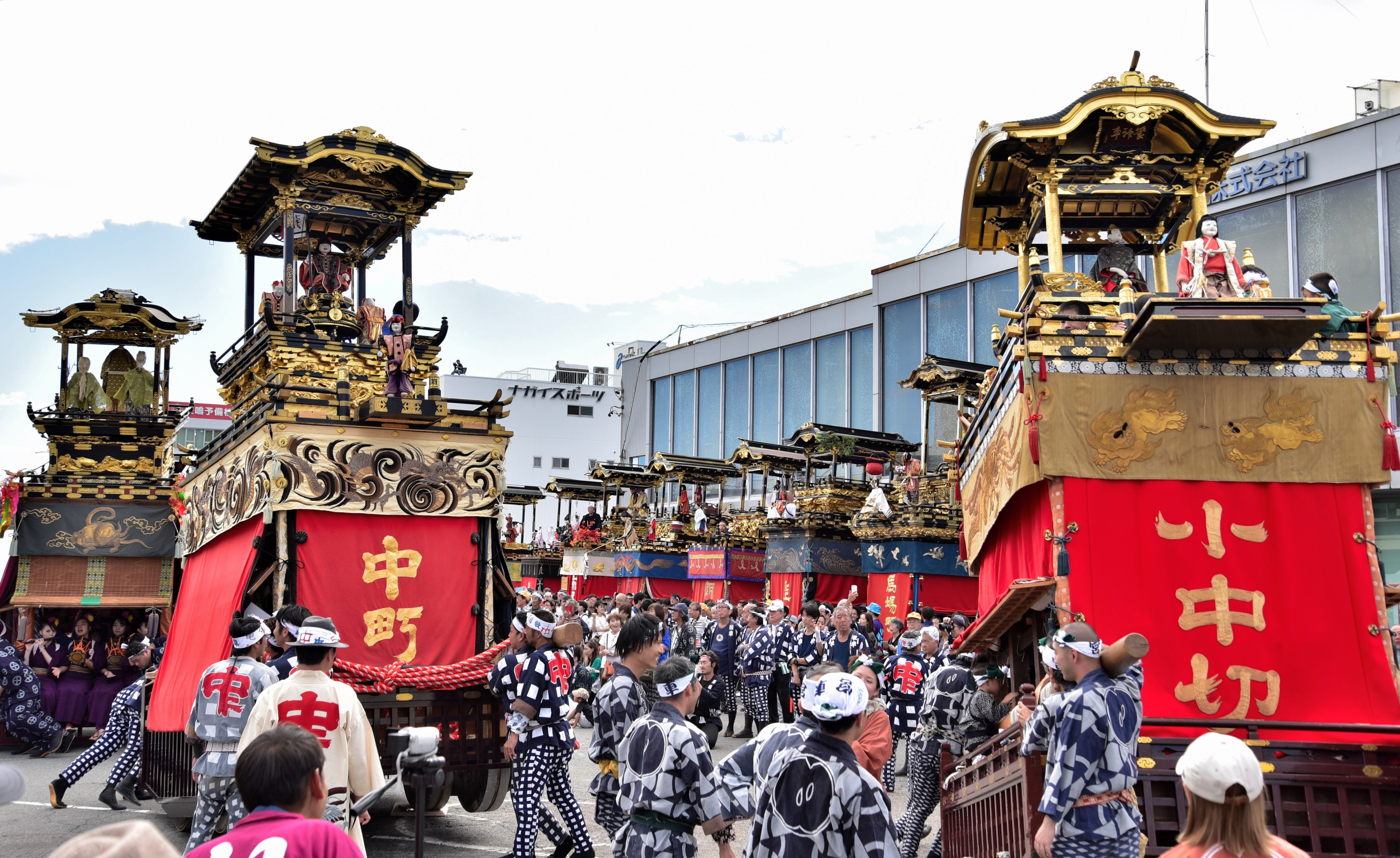
Owari Tsushima Autumn Festival
