= Anan, Nagano =

Anan 阿南町
- Town
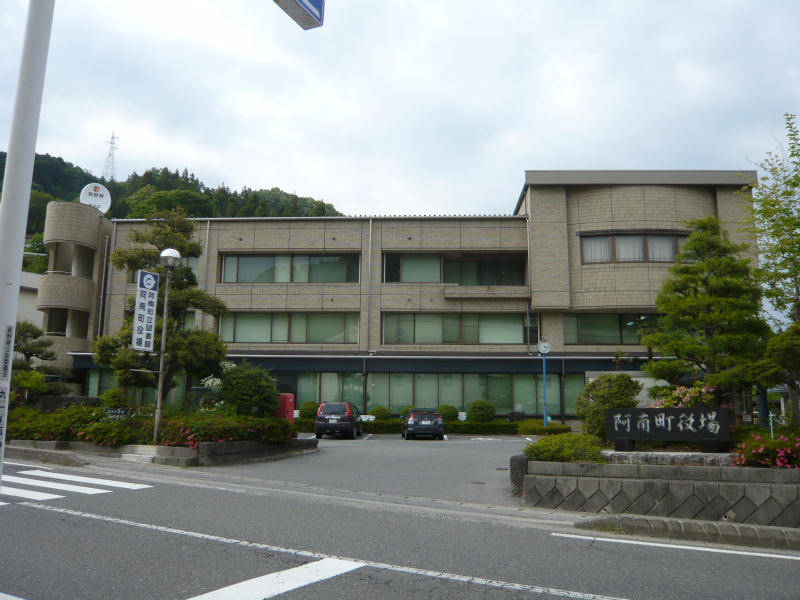
- Anan Town Hall

- Flag Seal

- Location of Anan in Nagano Prefecture

- Coordinates: 35°19′24.9″N 137°48′58.1″E
- Country: Japan
- Region: Chūbu (Kōshin'etsu)
- Prefecture: Nagano
- District: Shimoina

Area
  - Total: 123.07 km^{2} (47.52 sq mi)

Population (April 2019)
  - Total: 4,616
  - Density: 37.51/km^{2} (97.14/sq mi)
- Time zone: UTC+9 (Japan Standard Time)
- Symbols
  - Tree: Acer pycnanthum
  - Animal: Squirrel
- Phone number: 0265-35-3111
- Address: 58-1 Tojo, Anan-machi, Shimoina-gun, Nagano-ken 399-1511
- Website: Official website

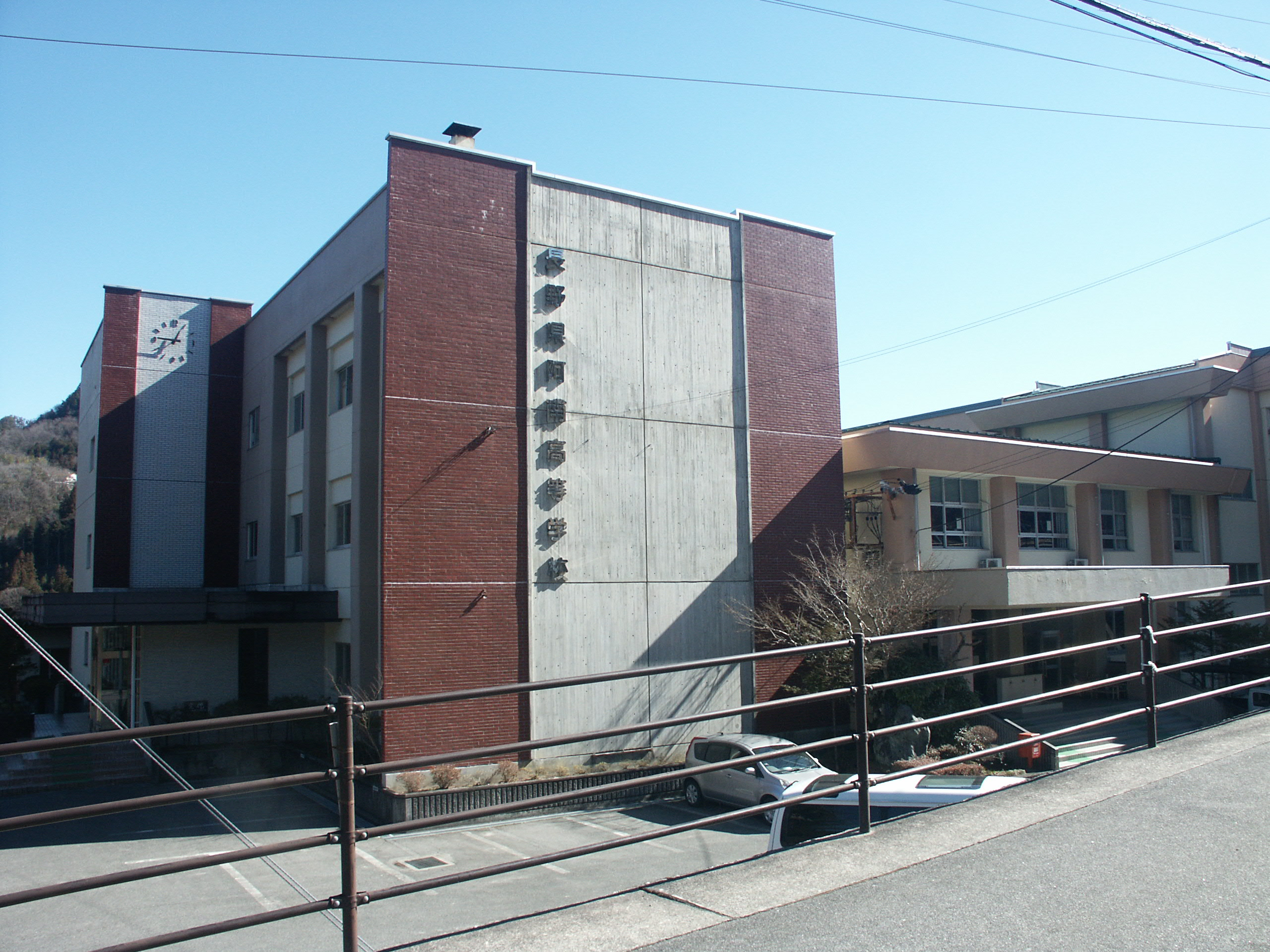
Nagano Prefectural Anan High School

Anan (阿南町, Anan-chō) is a town located in Nagano Prefecture, Japan. As of 1 April 2019, the town had an estimated population of 4,616 in 2058 households, and a population density of 38 persons per km^{2}. The total area of the town is 123.07 square kilometres (47.52 sq mi).

== Geography ==
Located at the southern tip of Nagano Prefecture, Anan is surrounded by the Japanese Alps. The center of the town located on the right bank of the Tenryū River.

=== Climate ===
The town has a climate characterized by hot and humid summers, and cold winters (Köppen climate classification Cfa). The average annual temperature in Anan is 11.7 °C. The average annual rainfall is 2023 mm with September as the wettest month. The temperatures are highest on average in August, at around 23.6 °C, and lowest in January, at around 0.0 °C.

=== Surrounding municipalities ===
- Aichi Prefecture
  - Toyone
- Nagano Prefecture
  - Achi
  - Hiraya
  - Shimojō
  - Tenryū
  - Urugi
  - Yasuoka

== Demographics ==
Per Japanese census data, the population of Ana has been declining over the past 70 years.

Historical population
| Year | Pop. | ±% |
|---|---|---|
| 1950 | 11,883 | — |
| 1960 | 10,343 | −13.0% |
| 1970 | 8,261 | −20.1% |
| 1980 | 7,290 | −11.8% |
| 1990 | 6,851 | −6.0% |
| 2000 | 6,232 | −9.0% |
| 2010 | 5,456 | −12.5% |
| 2020 | 4,299 | −21.2% |

== History ==
The area of present-day Anan was part of ancient Shinano Province. The modern town was established on July 1, 1957, by the merger of the villages of Oshimojo, Wago and Asage.

== Education ==
Anan has four public elementary schools and two public junior high schools operated by the town government. The town has one public high school operated by the Nagano Prefectural Board of Education.

== Transportation ==
=== Railway ===
- The town does not have any passenger railway service.

=== Highway ===
- National Route 151
- National Route 418
