= Shintoyone Dam =

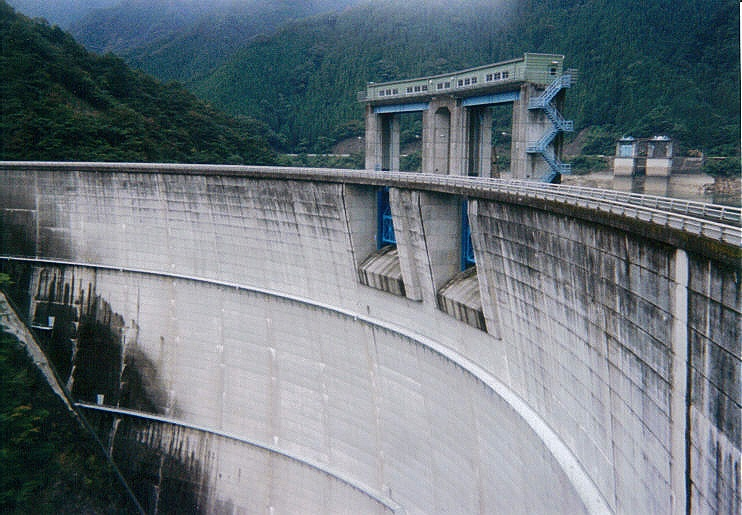
- Location: Toyone, Japan
- Coordinates: 35°07′33″N 137°45′38″E
- Construction began: 1969
- Opening date: 1972
- Owner(s): Ministry of Land, Infrastructure, Transport and Tourism (Japan)

Dam and spillways
- Type of dam: Arch dam
- Height: 116.5 m (382 ft)
- Length: 311 m (1,020 ft)

Reservoir
- Creates: Lake Midori
- Total capacity: 53,500,000 m^{3} (43,400 acre⋅ft)
- Catchment area: 136.3 km^{2} (52.6 sq mi)
- Surface area: 156.0 ha (385 acres)

Power Station
- Operator(s): Electric Power Development Company
- Type: Pumped-storage
- Installed capacity: 1,125 MW (1,509,000 hp)

The Shintoyone Dam (新豊根ダム) is a multipurpose dam in the village of Toyone in the Aichi Prefecture of Japan.

== History ==
The potential of the Tenryū River valley for hydroelectric power development was realized by the Meiji government at the start of the 20th century. The Tenryū River was characterized by a high volume of flow and a fast current. Its mountainous upper reaches and tributaries were areas of steep valleys and abundant rainfall, and were sparsely populated. However, the bulk of investment in hydroelectric power generation in the region was centered on the Ōi River, and it was not until the Taishō period that development began on the Tenryū River. With the completion of the Sakuma Dam, one of the tallest dams in Japan, on the main stream of the Tenryū River, developers turned their eyes to the confluence of the Ōnyugawa (大入川), a major tributary of the Tenryū River, and the Ōchisegawa (大千瀬川) in Aichi Prefecture. The Ōnyugawa was also of interest in that it was prone to flooding. Preliminary design work began in 1962, with construction beginning in 1969 after some opposition from the 100 households who needed to be relocated, and over increasing controversy regarding the issues of dams on the Tenryū and Ōi rivers rapidly filling with sand and silt from the mountains upstream, with the resultant reduction of the amount of sand and silt reaching the river mouth creating problems with coastal erosion. Construction was completed by the Kumagai Gumi in August 1973.

== Design ==
The Shintoyone Dam is a concrete arch dam with a height of 116.5 metres (382 ft) meters and a length of 311 metres (1,020 ft). It impounds a reservoir called Lake Midori (はみどり湖, midoriko) with a surface area of 156.0 hectares (385 acres). The catchment basin for the reservoir is 136.3 square kilometres (52.6 sq mi) square kilometers. The reservoir is connected by two 1,884 metres (6,181 ft) tunnels to the 1,125 megawatts (1,509,000 hp) pumped-storage hydroelectric power plant constructed next to the Sakuma Dam which creates the lower reservoir of the scheme.

== Surroundings ==
The Shintone Dam Reservoir is a popular attraction as the surrounding area is part of the Tenryū-Okumikawa Quasi-National Park.

== See also ==
- List of power stations in Japan
- List of pumped-storage hydroelectric power stations
