= Chiiwa Gorge =

River gorge in Shinshiro, Japan

Chiiwa-kyō Gorge
- IUCN category III (natural monument or feature)
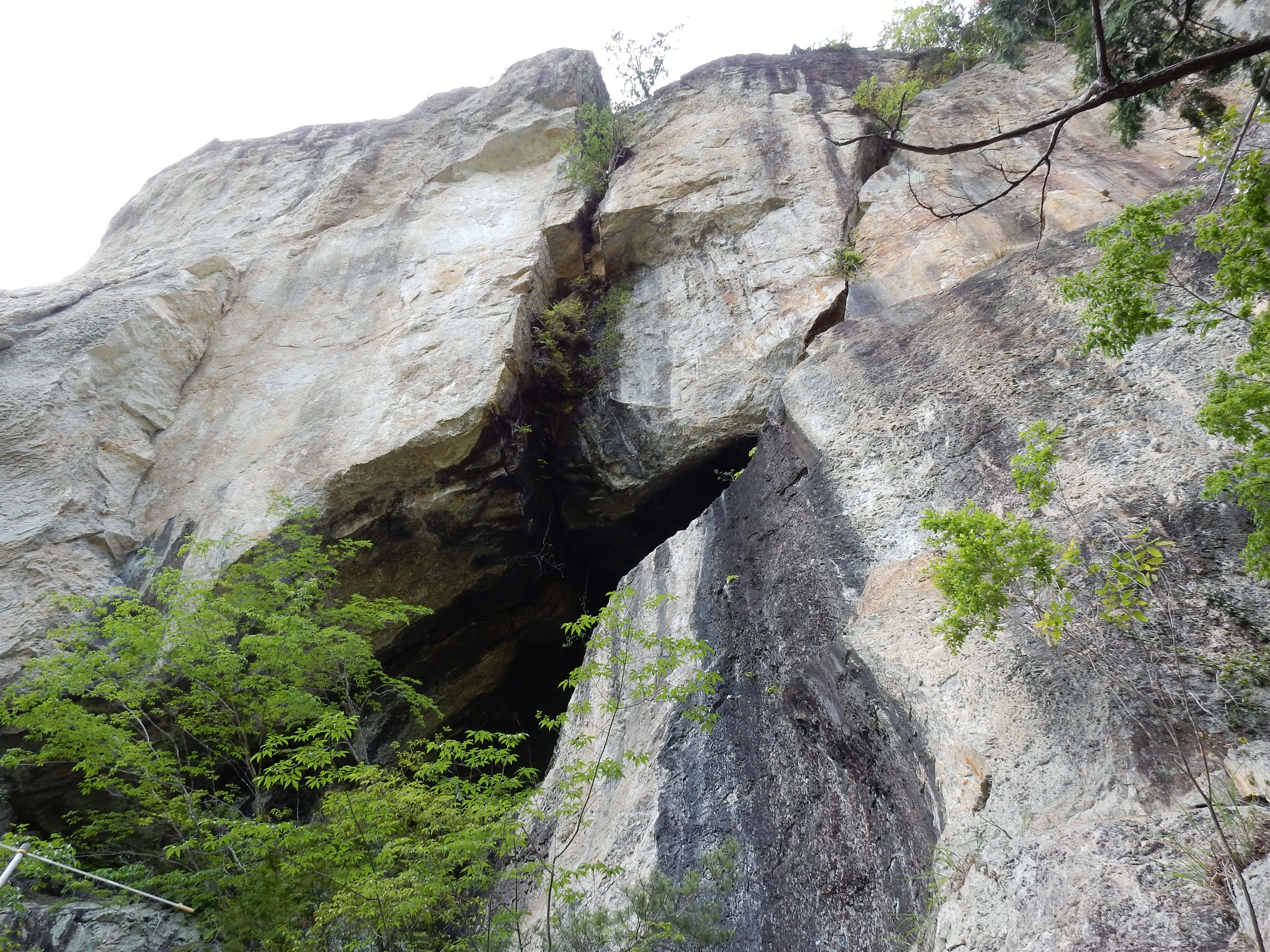
- Chiiwa cliff

- Location within Aichi Prefecture Location within Japan
- Location: Shinshiro, Aichi, Japan
- Coordinates: 35°01′04″N 137°39′49″E

Chiiwa Gorge (乳岩峡, Chiiwa-kyō) is a river gorge and scenic spot located within the city of Shinshiro, Aichi Prefecture, Japan. It has been protected as both a Place of Scenic Beauty and Natural Monument since 1934.

== Overview ==
Chiiwa-kyō is a canyon located on the Chiiwa River, a tributary of the Urengawa River, with a total length is four kilometers within the Tenryū-Okumikawa Quasi-National Park. The canyon is named after the Chiiwa (乳岩), a large white limestone cliff with a height of 670 metres (2,200 ft) overlooking the river. The cliff has many stalactites mainly composed of calcium carbonate from its overhangs, resembling breasts with milk. The gorge area is composed primarily of rhyolite tuff and the river bed in this area is made from a smooth monolith of limestone. Erosion on the riverbed has resulted in numerous potholes. The sides of the canyon are forested, and there are many caves in the area, the largest of which is called the "womb cave" and contains a statue of Kannon Bosatsu holding an infant. Near the top of the mountain, there is a natural arch called "Tsutenbashi" or "Gokurakumon".

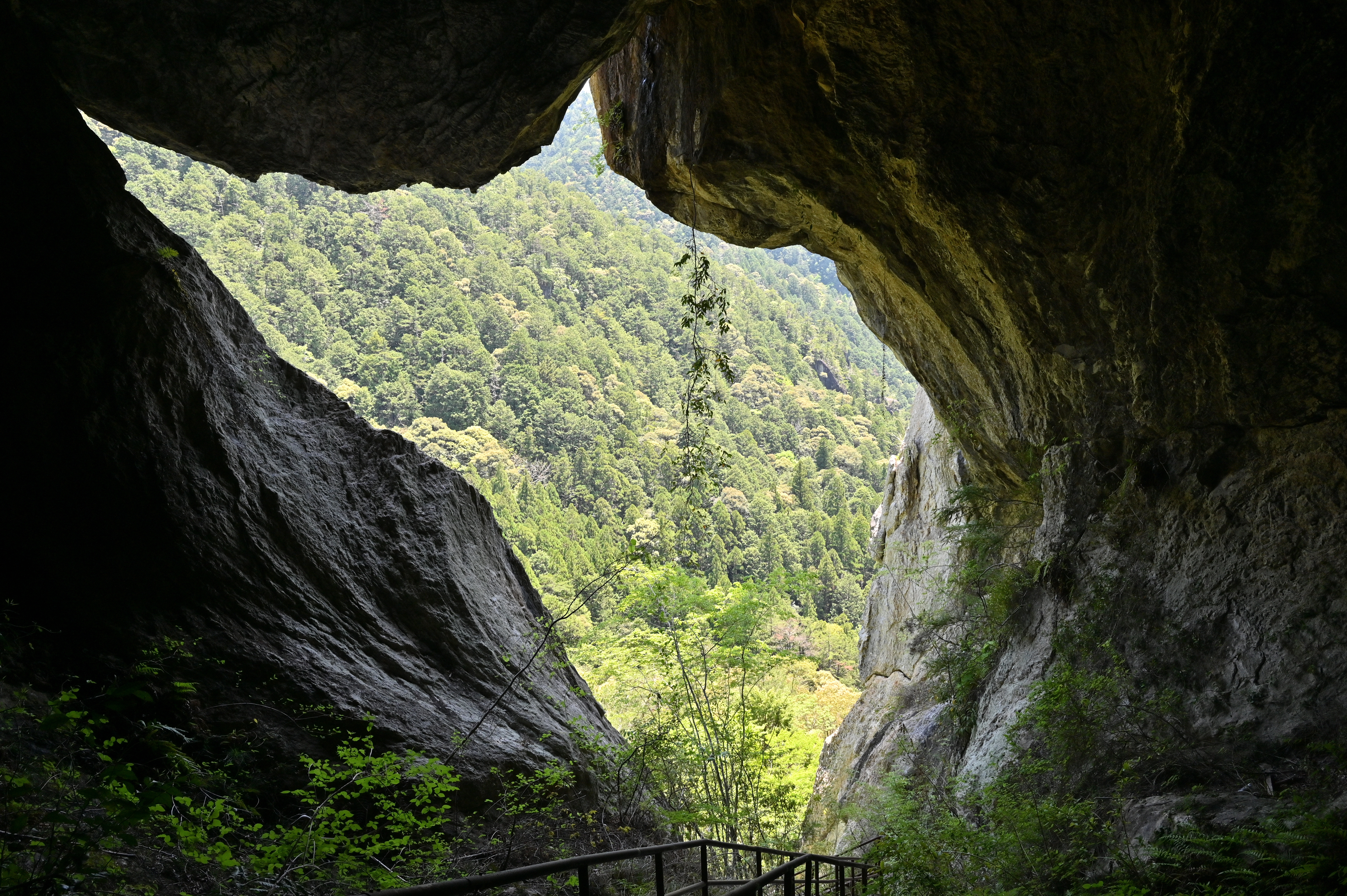
Chiiwa Cave

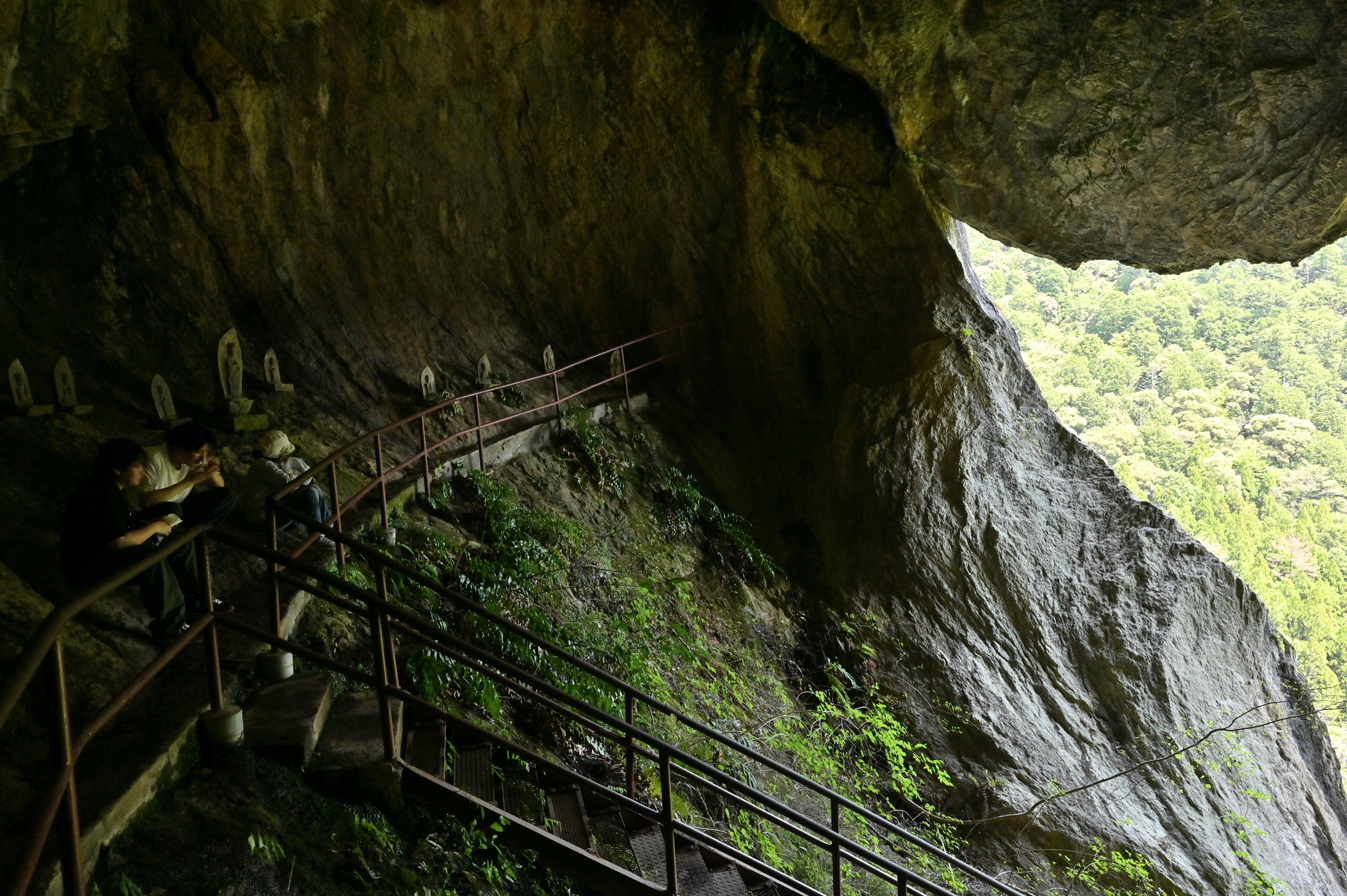
Inside the Chiiwa Cave

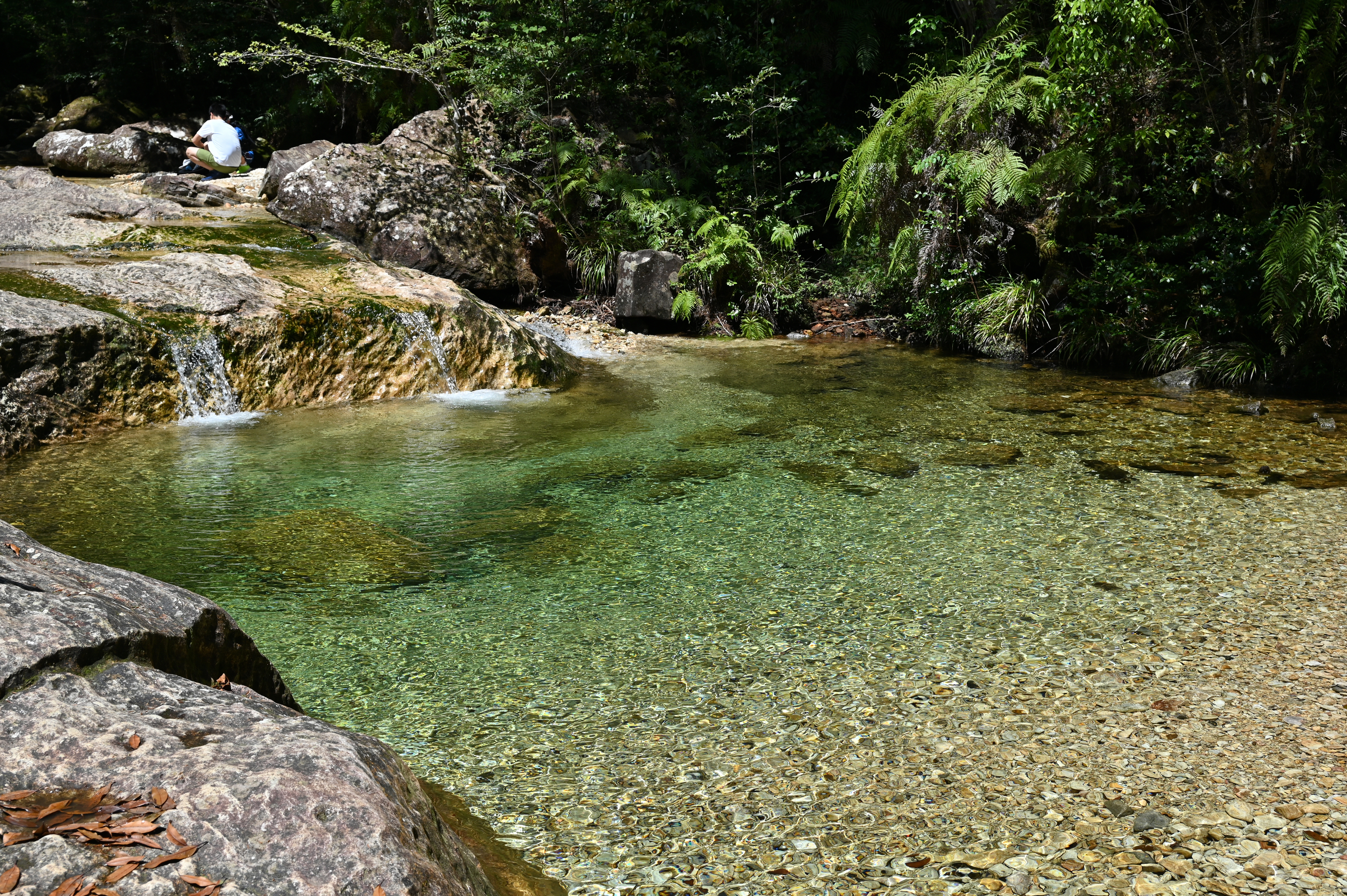
Chiiwa River

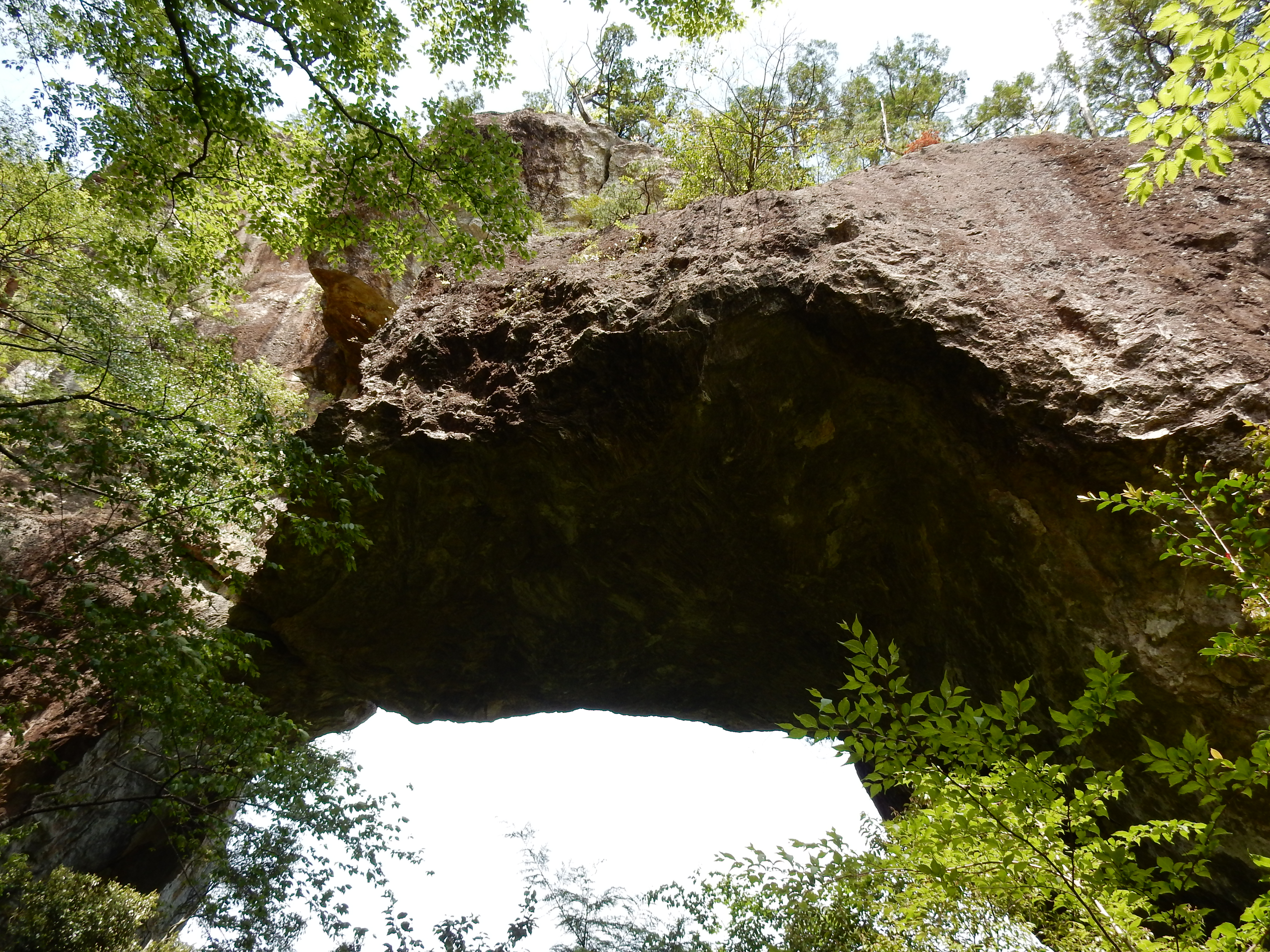
Tsuten Natural arch

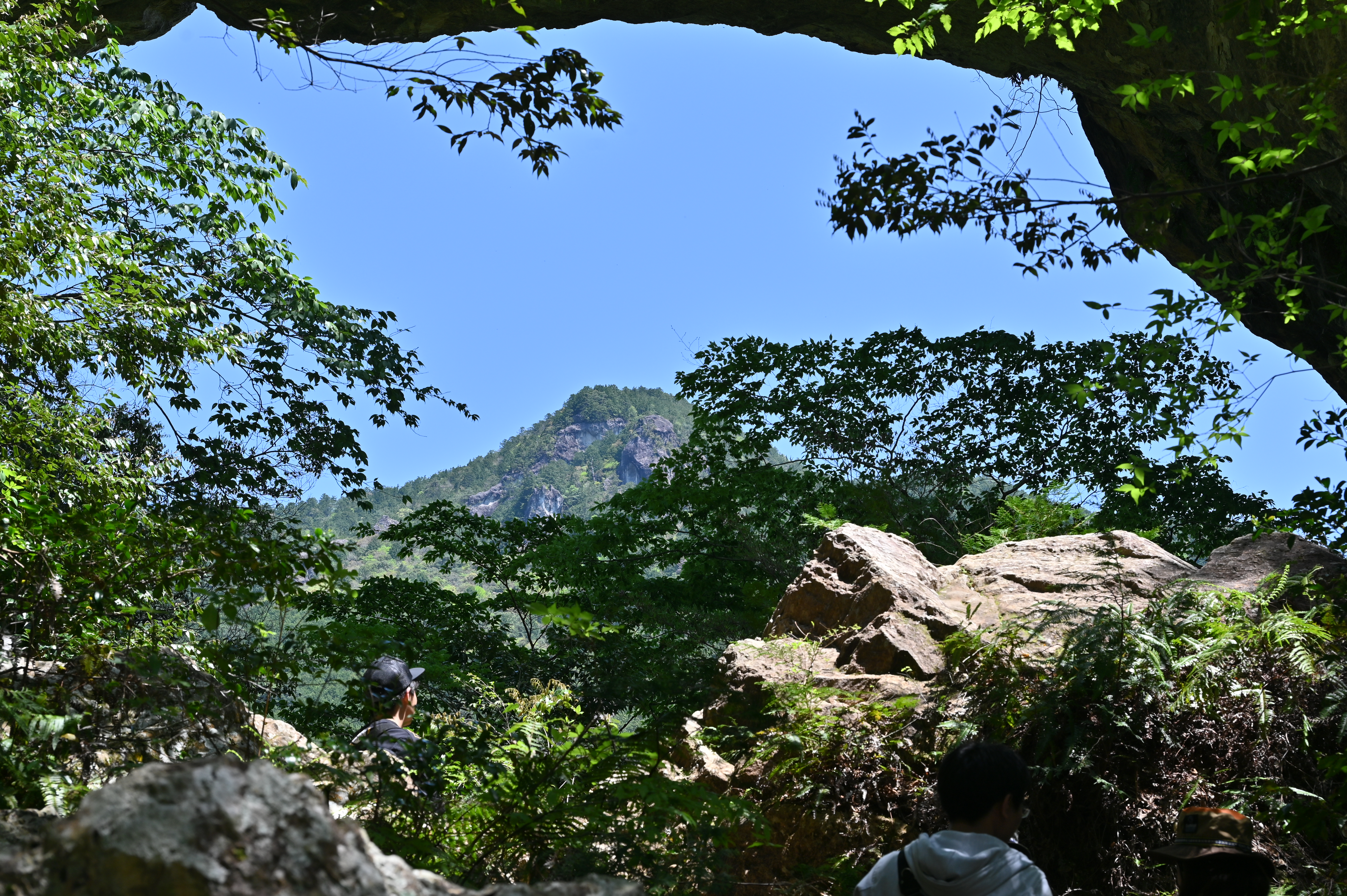
Mt. Myojin seen from Tsuten Natural arch

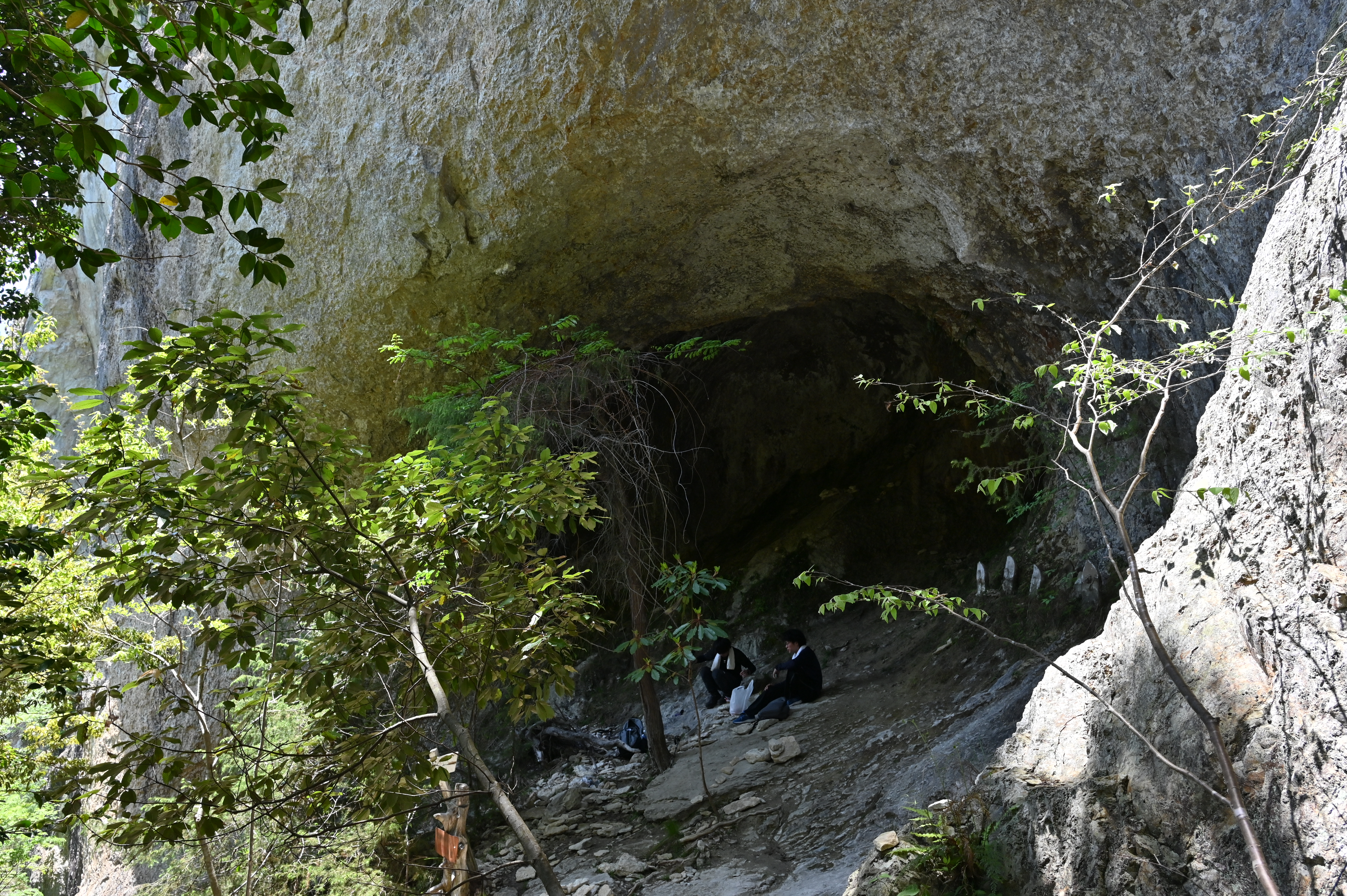
Merauku Stone

== See also ==
- List of Places of Scenic Beauty of Japan (Aichi)
