= Chausuyama (Aichi) =

Coordinates: 35°13′39″N 137°39′20″E

Chausuyama (Mount Chausu)
- 茶臼山
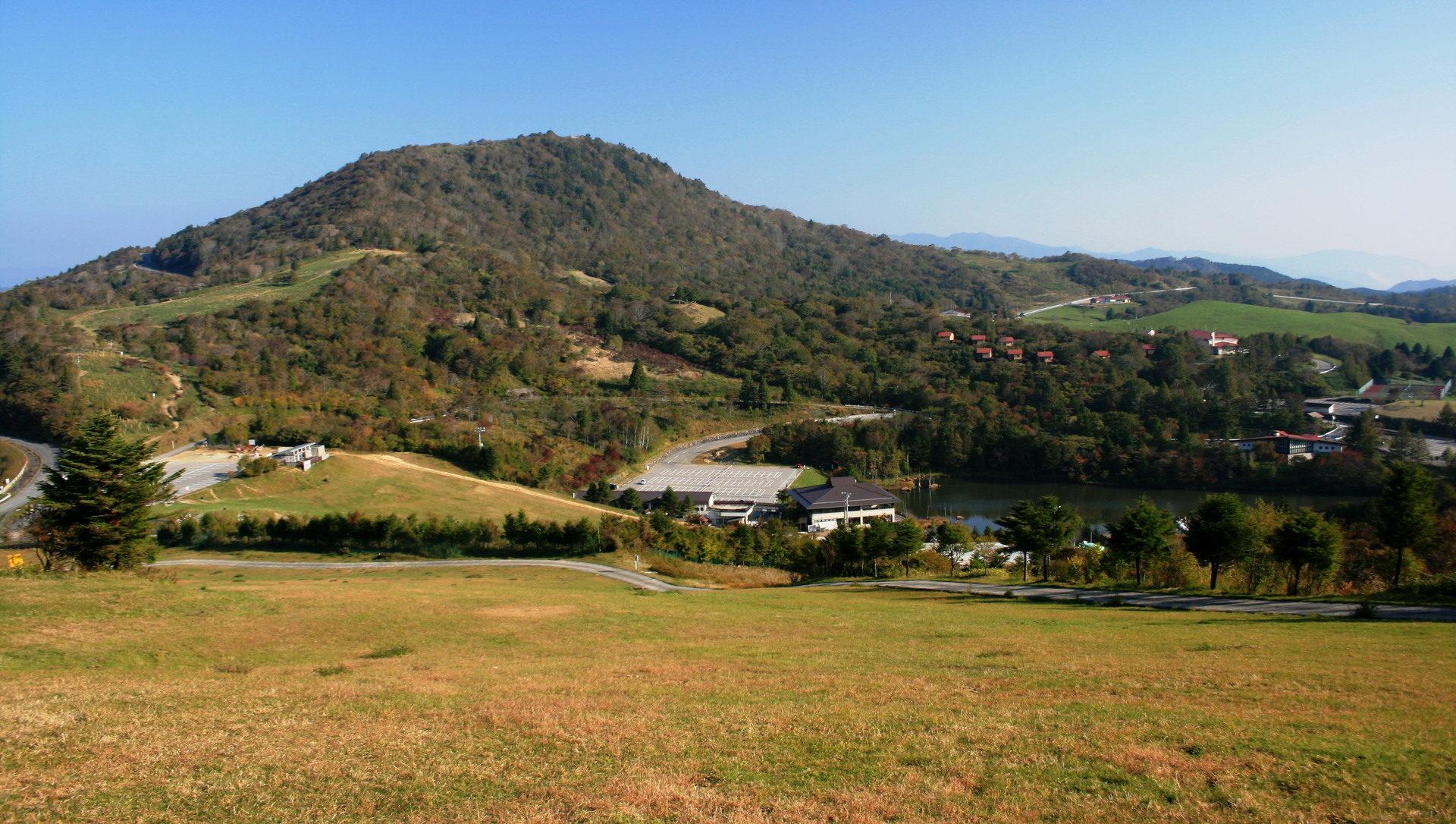
- Mount Chausu from Chausuyama Plateau

Highest point
- Elevation: 1,415.23 m (4,643.1 ft)

Geography
- Location: Toyone, Aichi / Neba, Nagano, Japan
- Parent range: Okumikawa

Climbing
- Easiest route: by car or hiking

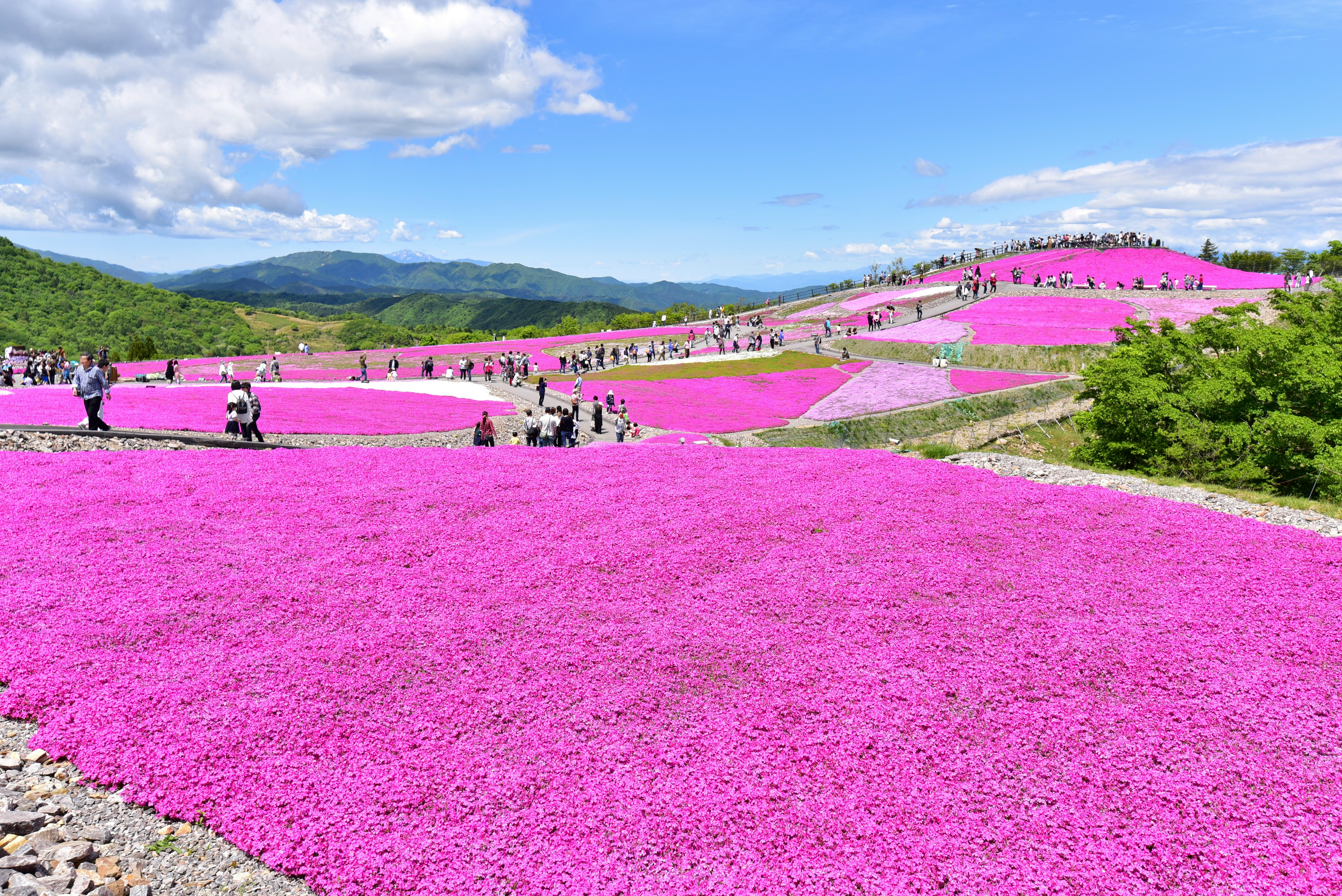
Moss phlox

Chausuyama (茶臼山; Mount Chausu) is a mountain located on the border between Aichi and Nagano Prefectures, with its highest point on the Aichi side. With a height of 1,415.2 metres (4,643 ft), it is the tallest peak within Aichi Prefecture. The mountain is within the borders of the Tenryū-Okumikawa Quasi-National Park. During wintertime, the area hosts a popular ski resort.

== See also ==
- Tenryū-Okumikawa Quasi-National Park
