= Neba, Nagano =

Neba 根羽村
- Village
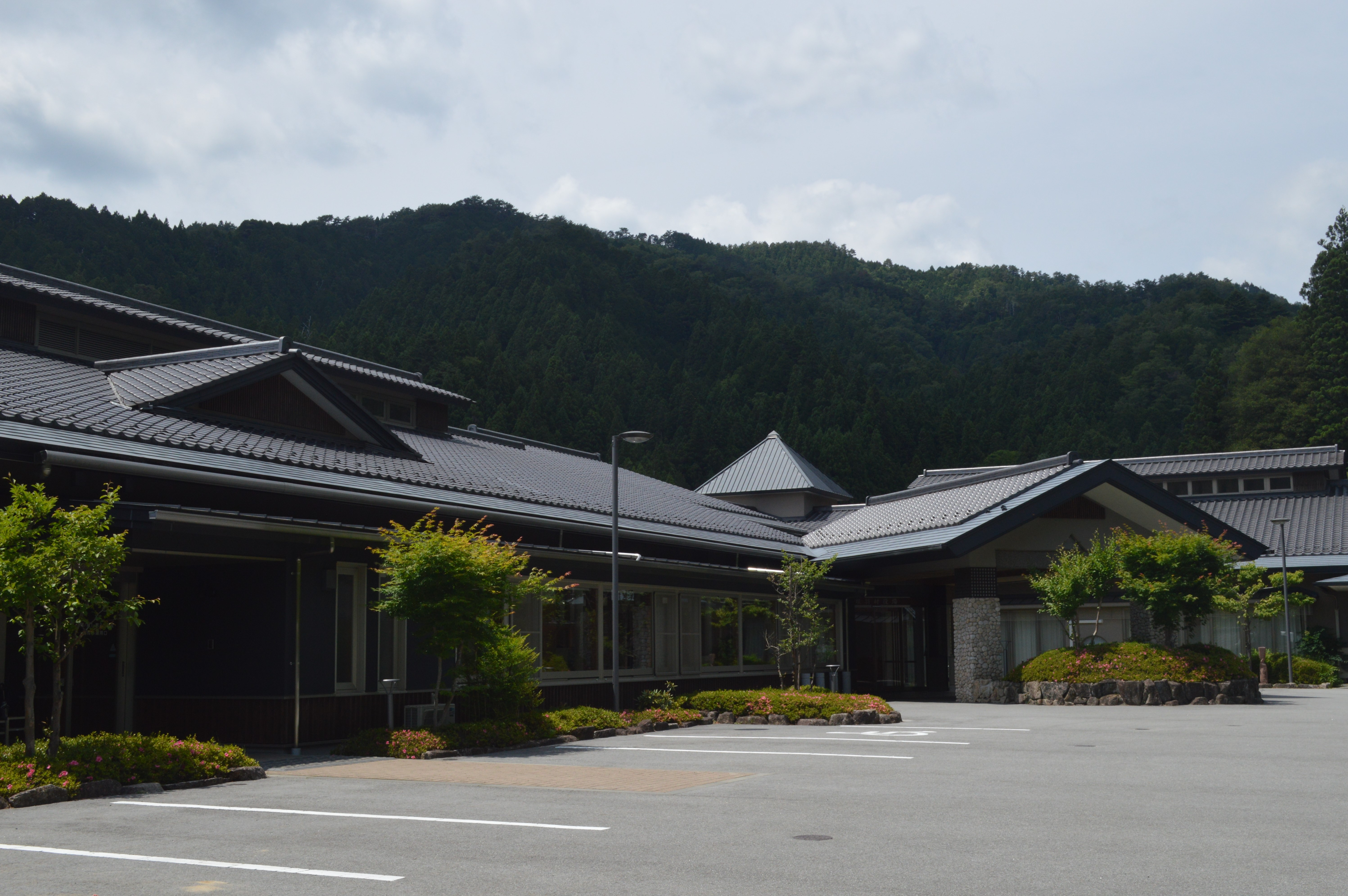
- Neba Village Hall

- Flag Seal
- Location of Neba in Nagano Prefecture

- Coordinates: 35°15′10.9″N 137°34′52.3″E
- Country: Japan
- Region: Chūbu (Kōshin'etsu)
- Prefecture: Nagano
- District: Shimoina

Area
  - Total: 89.97 km^{2} (34.74 sq mi)

Population (October 2018)
  - Total: 890
  - Density: 9.9/km^{2} (26/sq mi)
- Time zone: UTC+9 (Japan Standard Time)
- Symbols
  - Tree: Cryptomeria japonica
  - Flower: Azalea
- Phone number: 0260-28-2311
- Address: 1762-1, Neba-mura, Shimoina-gun, Nagano-ken 395-0701
- Website: Official website

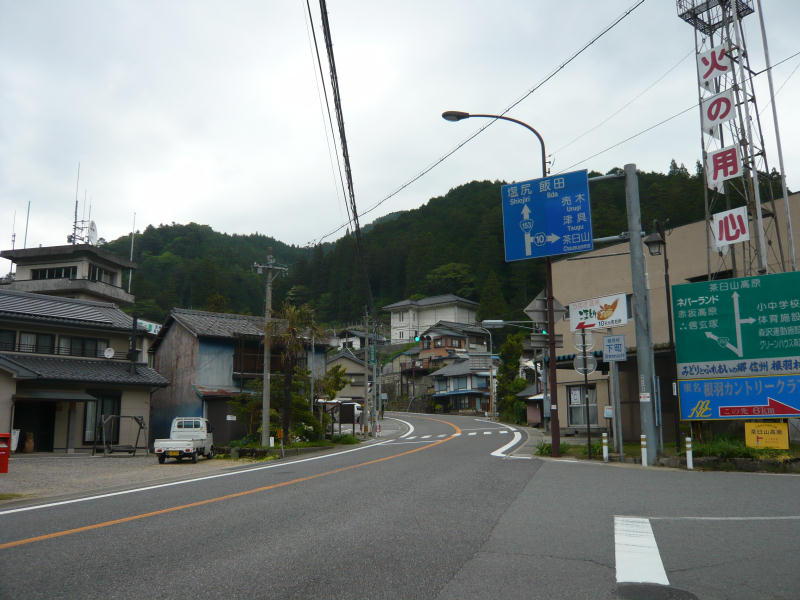
Neba Village

Neba (根羽村, Neba-mura) is a village located in Nagano Prefecture, Japan. As of 1 October 2018, the village had an estimated population of 890, and a population density of 9.9 persons per km^{2}. The total area of the village is 89.97 square kilometres (34.74 sq mi). Neba is known for its sweet corn, shiitake, and mountain trout.

== Geography ==
Neba is located mountainous far southern border of Nagano Prefecture with Aichi Prefecture and Gifu Prefecture. Mount Chausuyama (1415 meters) is located in the southeast of the village. Part of the village is within the borders of the Tenryū-Okumikawa Quasi-National Park.

=== Surrounding municipalities ===
- Aichi Prefecture
  - Shitara
  - Toyone
  - Toyota
- Gifu Prefecture
  - Ena
- Nagano Prefecture
  - Hiraya
  - Urugi

=== Climate ===
The village has a climate characterized by hot and humid summers, and cold winters (Köppen climate classification Cfa). The average annual temperature in Neba is 12.0 °C. The average annual rainfall is 2185 mm with September as the wettest month. The temperatures are highest on average in August, at around 23.8 °C, and lowest in January, at around -0.4 °C.

== Demographics ==
Per Japanese census data, the population of Neba has declined by more than two-thirds from its peak around 1950.

Historical population
Year	Pop.	±%
1940	2,826	—
1950	3,114	+10.2%
1960	3,059	−1.8%
1970	2,121	−30.7%
1980	1,773	−16.4%
1990	1,599	−9.8%
2000	1,380	−13.7%
2010	1,129	−18.2%
2020	852	−24.5%

== History ==
The village was once part of Mikawa Province until the 16th century, after which it became part of Shinano Province. Neba is also one of the many reported sites at which Takeda Shingen died. According to Koyo Gunkan, Takeda's strategy book, Neba is the place where he made camp and died in 1573 after the Siege of Noda Castle. The village of Neba was established with the creation of the modern municipalities system on April 1, 1889.

== Education ==
Neba has one public elementary school and one public middle school operated by the village government. The village does not have a high school.

== Transportation ==
=== Railway ===
- The village does not have any passenger railway service

=== Highway ===
- National Route 153

== Local attractions ==
- In Neba, there is a very old Japanese cedar. It is estimated as 1,800 years old, with a height of 40m and a width of 14m. It was designated a Japanese Natural Monument in 1944.
