= Shintoyone Pumped Storage Power Station =

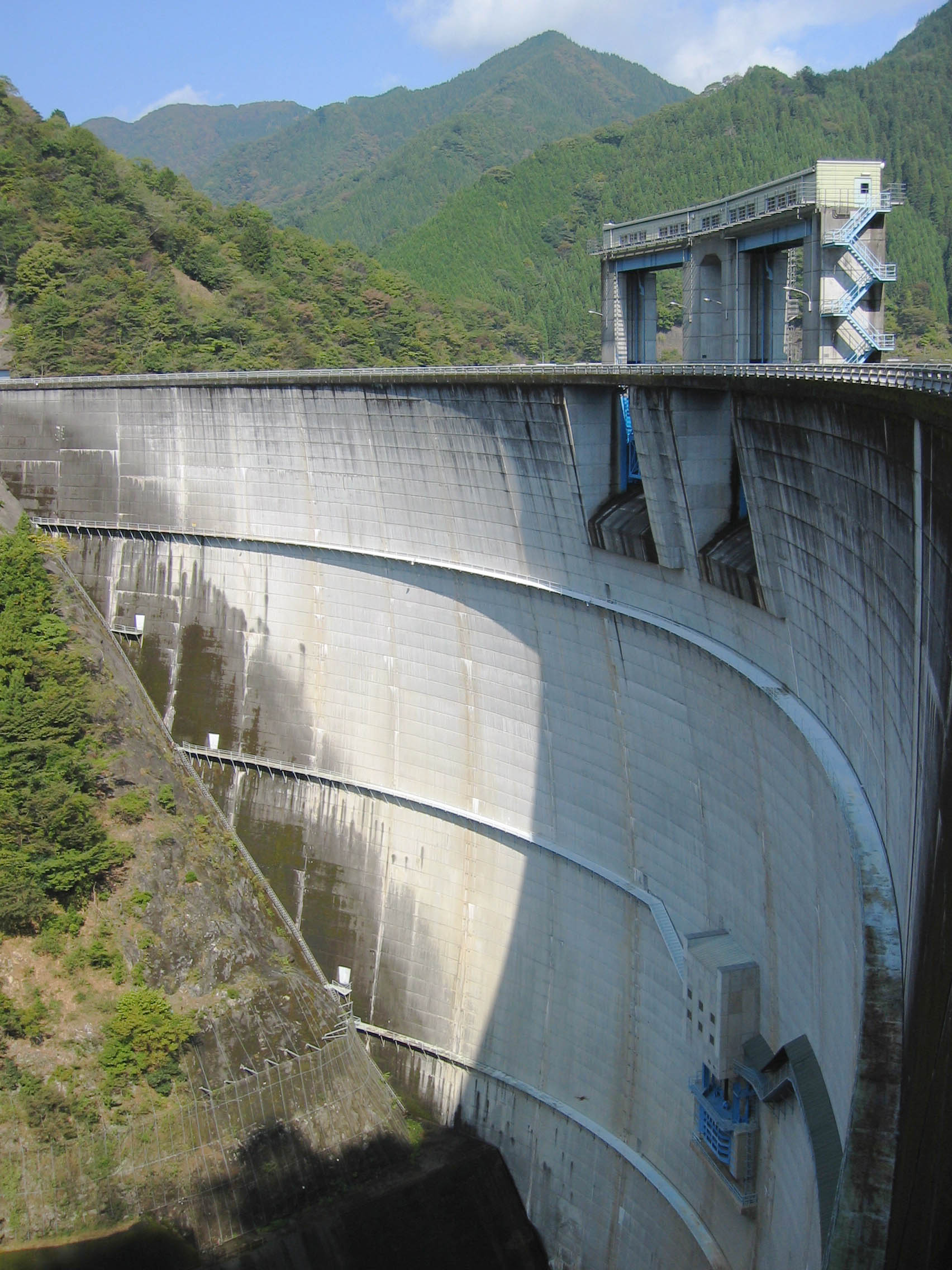
- Country: Japan
- Location: Toyone, Kitashitara, Aichi Prefecture
- Coordinates: 35°07′54.2″N 137°47′20.9″E
- Status: Operational
- Opening date: 1972
- Operator(s): J-Power

Upper reservoir
- Creates: Midori Lake
- Total capacity: 53,500,000 m^{3} (43,400 acre⋅ft)

Lower reservoir
- Creates: Sakuma Lake
- Total capacity: 326,848,000 m^{3} (264,980 acre⋅ft)

Power Station
- Hydraulic head: 203 m (666 ft)
- Pump-generators: 5 x 225 MW reversible Francis turbines
- Installed capacity: 1,125 MW (1,509,000 hp)

The Shintoyone Pumped Storage Power Station (Japanese: 新豊根発電所, Hepburn: Shintoyone Hatsudensho) is a large pumped-storage hydroelectric power plant in Toyone, Kitashitara, Aichi Prefecture, Japan. With an installed capacity of 1,125 megawatts (1,509,000 hp), the plant is one of the largest pumped-storage power stations in Japan.

The facilities are run by Electric Power Development Company (J-Power). Like most pumped-storage facilities, the power station uses two reservoirs, releasing and pumping as the demand rises and falls. Midori lake, formed by the Shintoyone Dam, is the upper artificial reservoir, while Sakuma Dam forms the lower reservoir. Shintoyone Dam is a 116.5 m-tall arch dam, while Sakuma Dam is a 155.5 m-tall concrete gravity dam. Sakuma Dam was built between 1953 and 1956 to provide water to the Sakuma conventional hydroelectric power plant. Shintoyone Dam was completed later in 1973 to act as the upper reservoir of the Shintoyone Pumped storage plant.

The plant employs five 225 MW pump/generator units, for a total net capacity of 1125 MW. The maximum water flow is 645 cubic meters per second and the effective head is 203 m. The intake elevation is at 474 m over sea level, while the discharge elevation is 260 m over sea level. Construction of the plant started in November 1969 and became operational between November 1972 and October 1973.

Sakuma Dam on the lower reservoir also provides water for the Sakuma Power Station (佐久間発電所, Sakuma Hatsudensho) and the Second Sakuma Power Station (佐久間第二発電所, Sakuma Daini Hatsudensho) two conventional hydroelectric power plants. Construction of the first plant started in 1953 and became operational in 1956. The plant employs four 96 MW Francis turbines, for a total capacity of 350 MW.

The second plant became operational in 1982. It employs two Kaplan turbines with a combined capacity of 32 MW. The plant uses the residual water drop from the first plant to Tenryū river downstream.

== See also ==
- List of power stations in Japan
- Hydroelectricity in Japan
- List of pumped-storage hydroelectric power stations
