= Tomiyama, Aichi =

Tomiyama 富山村
- Former municipality
- Flag Seal

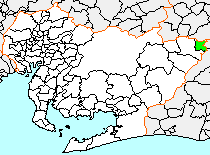
- Location of Tomiyama in Aichi Prefecture

- Location in Japan
- Coordinates: 35°14′6.0″N 137°11′6.5″E
- Country: Japan
- Region: Chūbu (Tōkai)
- Prefecture: Aichi Prefecture
- District: Kitashitara
- Merged: October 1, 2005 (now part of Toyone)

Area
  - Total: 34.78 km^{2} (13.43 sq mi)

Population (November 27, 2005)
  - Total: 218
  - Density: 6.3/km^{2} (16/sq mi)
- Time zone: UTC+09:00 (JST)

Tomiyama (富山村, Tomiyama-mura) was a village located in Kitashitara District, Aichi Prefecture, Japan.

As of May 1, 2004, the village had an estimated population of 218 and a density of 6.3 persons per km^{2}. Its total area was 34.78 km^{2}.

== Geography ==
Tomiyama was located at the extreme northeast corner of Aichi Prefecture, in an area of 1000-meter mountains. Some 90 percent of the village area was covered in mountains and forest.

== History ==
Tomiyama Village was created in the early Meiji period cadastral reform of 1876. The completion of the Sakuma Dam in 1955 flooded much of the arable land in the village, forcing the resettlement of most of the inhabitants, and leaving Tomiyama with the distinction of being the least populous village in Japan (aside from some isolated islets).

On November 27, 2005, Tomiyama was merged into expanded the village of Toyone and has ceased to exist as an independent municipality.
