= Hiraya =

Hiraya may refer to:

- Hiraya, Nagano, village in Japan
- Kinaray-a language, language in the Philippines
