= Urugi =

Urugi 売木村
- Village
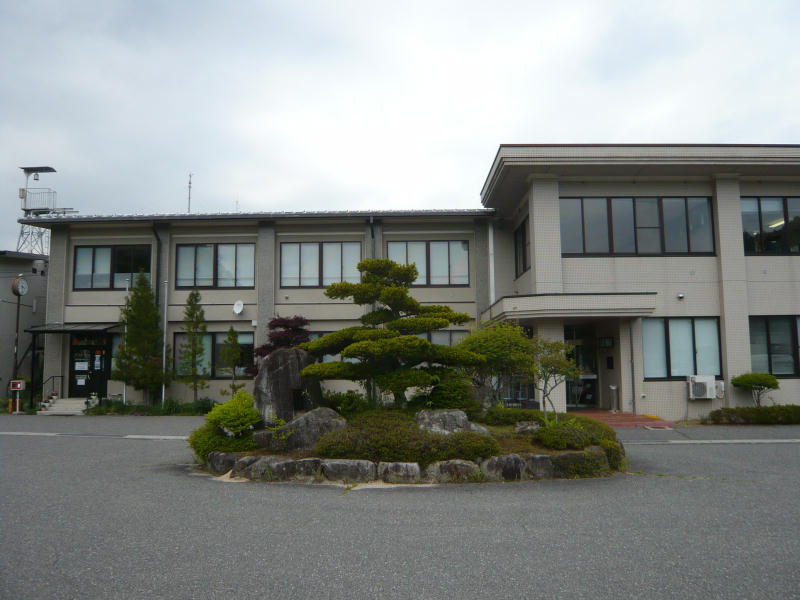
- Urugi Village Hall

- Flag Seal

- Location of Urugi in Nagano Prefecture

- Coordinates: 35°16′15.8″N 137°42′40.3″E
- Country: Japan
- Region: Chūbu (Kōshin'etsu)
- Prefecture: Nagano
- District: Shimoina

Area
  - Total: 43.43 km^{2} (16.77 sq mi)

Population (April 2019)
  - Total: 552
  - Density: 12.7/km^{2} (32.9/sq mi)
- Time zone: UTC+9 (Japan Standard Time)
- Symbols
  - Tree: Lilium japanicum
  - Flower: Fritillaria camschatcensis
  - Bird: Japanese robin
- Phone number: 0260-28-2311
- Address: 968-1, Urugi-mura, Shimoina-gun, Nagano-ken 399-1601
- Website: Official website

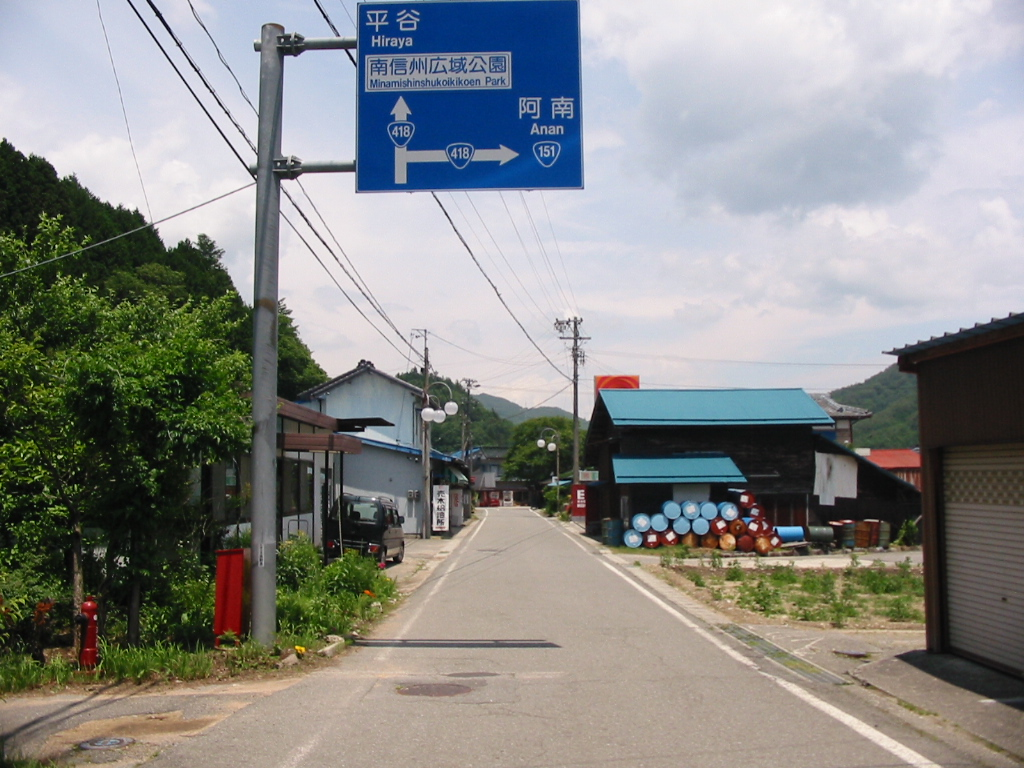
Urugi Village

Urugi (売木村, Urugi-mura) is a village located in Nagano Prefecture, Japan. As of 1 April 2019, the village had an estimated population of 552 in 274 households, and a population density of 13 persons per km^{2}. The total area of the village is 43.43 square kilometres (16.77 sq mi).

== Geography ==
Urugi is located mountainous southern border of Nagano Prefecture with Aichi Prefecture at an altitude of 800 meters, surrounded by 1000 meter mountains. Over 80 percent of the village area is forested. The Iwakura Dam is located in Urugi.

=== Surrounding municipalities ===
- Aichi Prefecture
  - Toyone
- Nagano Prefecture
  - Anan
  - Hiraya
  - Neba

=== Climate ===
The town has a climate characterized by hot and humid summers, and cold winters (Köppen climate classification Cfa). The average annual temperature in Urugi is 11.0 °C. The average annual rainfall is 2106 mm with September as the wettest month. The temperatures are highest on average in August, at around 22.8 °C, and lowest in January, at around -0.7 °C.

== Demographics ==
Per Japanese census data, the population of Urugi has decreased over the past 70 years.

Historical population
Year	Pop.	±%
1950	1,469	—
1960	1,320	−10.1%
1970	1,024	−22.4%
1980	828	−19.1%
1990	743	−10.3%
2000	741	−0.3%
2010	656	−11.5%
2020	548	−16.5%

== History ==
The area of present-day Urugi was part of ancient Shinano Province. The village of Toyo was established on April 1, 1889 with the establishment of the modern municipalities system. Toyo Village dissolved on July 1, 1948, with a portion annexed by neighboring Anan, and the remainder becoming the village of Urugi.

== Economy ==
The economy of Urugi is agricultural, with corn, rice, shiitake and scallions as main crops.

== Education ==
Urugi has one public elementary school and one public middle school operated by the village government. The village does not have a high school.

== Transportation ==
=== Railway ===
- The village does not have any passenger railway service

=== Highway ===
- National Route 418
