= List of places of scenic beauty of Japan (Aichi) =

This list is of the places of scenic beauty of Japan located within the Prefecture of Aichi.

== National Places of Scenic Beauty ==
As of 1 July 2020, seven Places have been designated at a national level; the Kiso River spans the prefectural borders with Gifu.

Site	Municipality	Comments	Image	Coordinates	Type	Ref.
Atera Seven Falls 阿寺の七滝; Atera-no-nana-taki	Shinshiro	also a Natural Monument		34°57′02″N 137°38′44″E	6	
Chiiwa and Chiiwa Gorge 乳岩および乳岩峡; Chiiwa oyobi Chiiwa-kyō	Shinshiro	also a Natural Monument		35°01′04″N 137°39′49″E	6, 10	
Mount Hōraiji 鳳来寺山; Hōraiji-san	Shinshiro	also a Natural Monument		34°58′54″N 137°34′57″E	3, 5, 11	
Nagoya Castle Ninomaru Gardens 名古屋城二之丸庭園; Nagoya-jō ninomaru teien	Nagoya			35°11′05″N 136°54′09″E	1	
Kiso River Embankment (Cherry Blossoms) 木曽川堤（サクラ） Kiso-gawa tsutsumi (sakura)	Kōnan, Ichinomiya	also a Natural Monument		34°57′02″N 137°38′44″E ?	2, 3	
Former Ryūshō-in Gardens 旧龍性院庭園; Kyū-Ryūshō-in	Toyota			35°10′23″N 137°10′39″E	1	
Kiso River 木曽川; Kiso-gawa	Inuyama	the designation includes areas of Kakamigahara, Kani, and Sakahogi in Gifu Prefecture		35°23′49″N 136°57′31″E	6, 10	

== Prefectural Places of Scenic Beauty ==
As of 1 May 2019, five Places have been designated at a prefectural level.

Site	Municipality	Comments	Image	Coordinates	Type	Ref.
Mount Iwaya 北設山岳公園岩古谷山; Hokusetsu-sangaku kōen iwaya-san	Shitara			35°05′15″N 137°36′03″E		
Renge-ji Gardens 蓮華寺庭園; Rengeji teien	Ama			35°12′19″N 136°46′11″E		
Yatsuhashi Legendary Site 八橋伝説地; Yatsuhashi densetsuchi	Chiryū	celebrated in Ise Monogatari		35°00′33″N 137°04′09″E		
Utsutsu Jinja Gardens 内々神社庭園; Utsutsu Jinja teien	Kasugai			35°19′33″N 137°03′41″E		
Mankō-ji Gardens 満光寺庭園; Mankōji teien	Shinshiro			34°54′10″N 137°36′50″E		

== Municipal Places of Scenic Beauty ==
As of 1 May 2019, eighteen Places have been designated at a municipal level.

== Registered Places of Scenic Beauty ==
As of 1 July 2020, two Monuments have been registered (as opposed to designated) as Places of Scenic Beauty at a national level.

Place	Municipality	Comments	Image	Coordinates	Type	Ref.
Former Hayashi Family Gardens 旧林氏庭園 kyū-Hayashi-shi teien	Ichinomiya			35°18′22″N 136°44′11″E		
Tsuruma Park 鶴舞公園; Tsuruma kōen	Nagoya			35°09′19″N 136°55′14″E		

== See also ==
- Cultural Properties of Japan
- List of parks in Aichi Prefecture
- List of Historic Sites of Japan (Aichi)
