= Toyone =

Toyone 豊根村
- Village
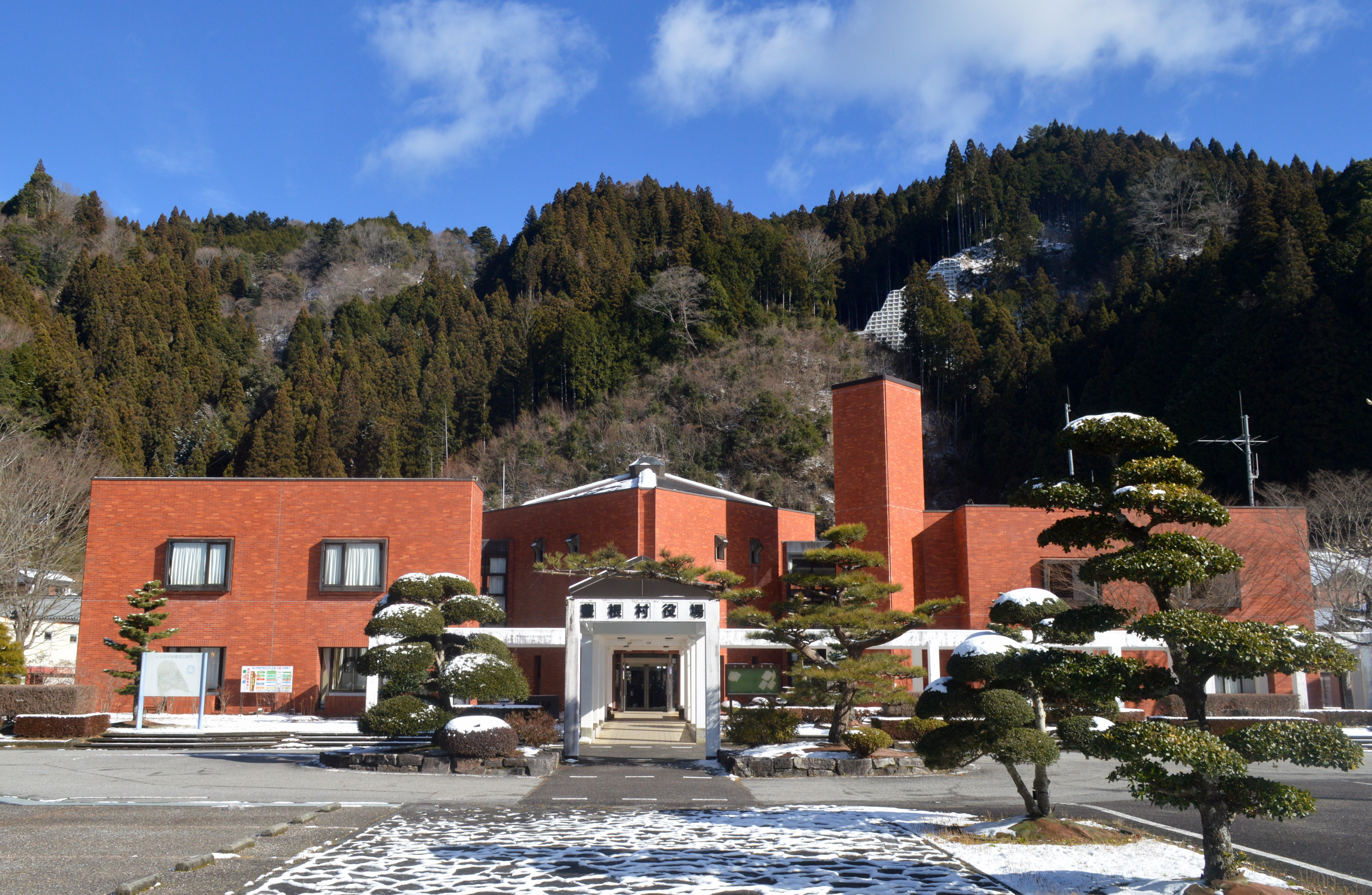
- Toyone Village Office

- Flag Emblem

- Location of Toyone in Aichi Prefecture

- Coordinates: 35°8′47.4″N 137°43′11.4″E
- Country: Japan
- Region: Chūbu region Tōkai region
- Prefecture: Aichi
- District: Kitashitara

Area
  - Total: 155.88 km^{2} (60.19 sq mi)

Population (October 1, 2019)
  - Total: 1,031
  - Density: 6.614/km^{2} (17.13/sq mi)
- Time zone: UTC+9 (Japan Standard Time)
- Tree: Cryptomeria
- Flower: Narcissus
- Phone number: 0536-85-1311
- Address: 1-77 Shimokurokawa, Toyone-mura, Kitashitara-gun, Aichi-ken 449-0403
- Website: Official website

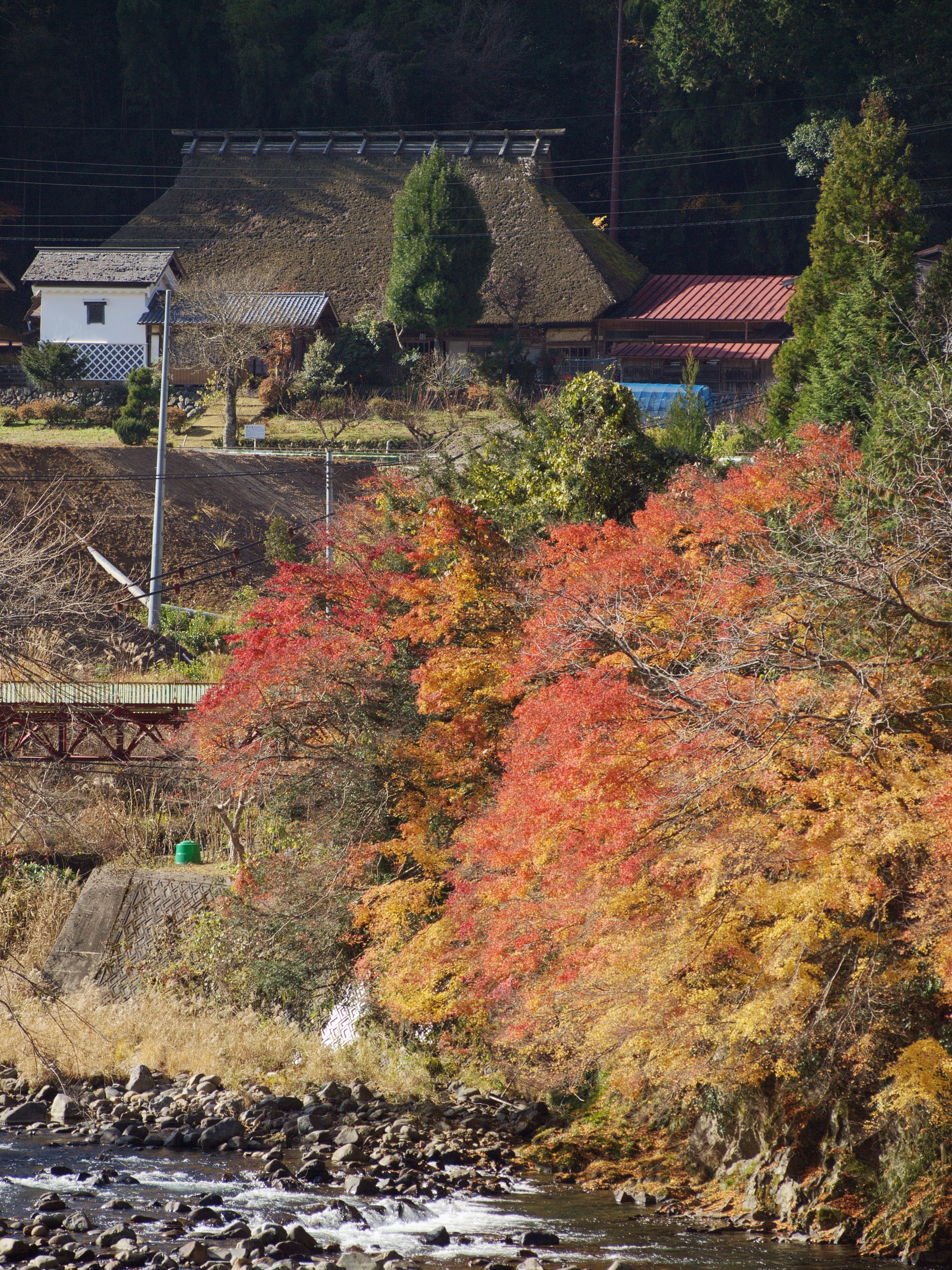
Kamikurogawa, Toyone

Toyone (豊根村, Toyone-mura) is a village located in Kitashitara District, Aichi Prefecture, Japan. As of 1 October 2019, the village had an estimated population of 1,031 in 507 households, and a population density of 6.61 persons per km². The total area of the village was 155.88 square kilometres (60.19 sq mi).

== Geography ==
Toyone is located in the extreme northeast corner of Aichi Prefecture. Most of the village is within the borders of the Tenryū-Okumikawa Quasi-National Park. The reservoir from Sakuma Dam in Shizuoka Prefecture extends into the village. Shintoyone Dam is also located within the borders of Toyone. Chausuyama, at 1415 meters, on the border between Aichi and Nagano is the highest point in Aichi Prefecture.

=== Neighboring municipalities ===
Aichi Prefecture

- Kitashitara District
  - Shitara
  - Tōei

Nagano Prefecture

- Shimoina District
  - Anan
  - Neba
  - Tenryū
  - Urugi

Shizuoka Prefecture

- Tenryū-ku, Hamamatsu

== Demographics ==
Per Japanese census data, the population of Toyone has been decreasing rapidly over the past 70 years.

Historical population
Year	Pop.	±%
1940	5,193	—
1950	5,414	+4.3%
1960	4,610	−14.9%
1970	3,865	−16.2%
1980	2,126	−45.0%
1990	1,813	−14.7%
2000	1,629	−10.1%
2010	1,337	−17.9%

=== Climate ===
The village has a climate characterized by characterized by hot and humid summers, and relatively mild winters (Köppen climate classification Cfa). The average annual temperature in Toyone is 12.2 °C. The average annual rainfall is 2192 mm with September as the wettest month. The temperatures are highest on average in August, at around 23.8 °C, and lowest in January, at around 0.9 °C.

== History ==
Toyone Village was established on October 1, 1889 with the establishment of the modern municipalities system. In 1955, the rising waters of the Sakuma Dam from neighboring Shizuoka Prefecture flooded the central inhabited portion of Toyone, forcing the relocation of over one third of the village inhabitants. On November 27, 2005, the village of Tomiyama was merged with Toyone.

== Economy ==
The primary industry of Toyone is small-scale forestry, and seasonal tourism. The village also derives revenue from hydroelectric power generation.

== Education ==
Toyone has one public elementary school and one public junior high school operated by the village government. The village does not have a public high school, but there is one private high school, which is a branch of the Toyohashi-based Sakuragaoka High School.

== Transportation ==
=== Railway ===
Toyone does not have any passenger railway service.

=== Highway ===
- National Route 151
