= Former Ryūshō-in Gardens =

Landscape garden in Toyota, Japan

- 旧龍性院庭園
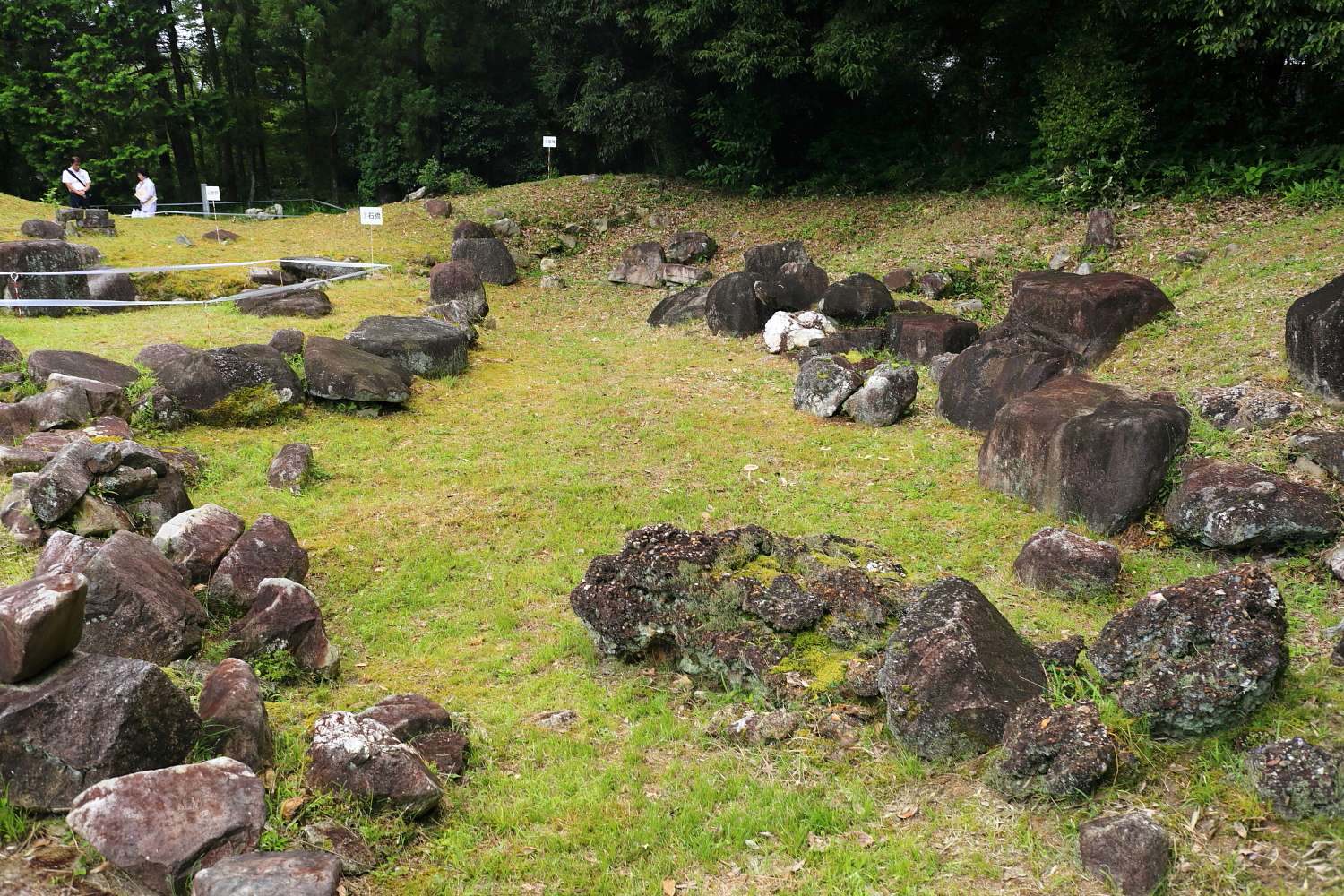
- Former Ryūshō-in Gardens

- Location within Aichi Prefecture Location within Japan
- Type: Urban park
- Location: Toyota, Aichi, Japan
- Coordinates: 40°37′00″N 140°34′12″E
- Area: 1,378.4 square metres (0.3406 acres)
- Created: Edo period
- Operator: private
- Status: not open without prior permission
- National Palace of Scenic Beauty

Former Ryūshō-in Gardens (旧龍性院庭園, kyū-Ryūshō-in) is a Japanese landscape garden and nationally designated Place of Scenic Beauty in the city of Toyota, Aichi Prefecture, Japan.

== Overview ==
The former Ryūshō-in Garden is located at the southern foot of Mount Sanage and was built at Ryūshō-in, one of the jingu-ji Buddhist temples associated with Sanage Jinja, a major Shinto shrine in the area. Ryūshō-in was abandoned in 1868 due to the Shinbutsu bunri edits of the Meiji government separating Buddhism from Shintoism, but the garden survived.

The garden is at the southern foot of Mount Sanage, and measures about 43 meters north-to-south by 28 meters east-to-west. The garden is mainly viewed from a guest hall on the east side. A large artificial hill is built on the far right, and a waterfall is built near the hem. Another artificial hill is also on the far left, and a gentle peak in the middle connects two hill. The pond (now dry) with a stone bridge, has stonework along the revetment forming an intricate curve, and large stones are arranged in many locations.

Archaeological findings suggest that the garden was established in the first half of the 17th century. Although its appearance changed over the years, excavations have shown that the layout and stone placement are in good agreement with description from the Edo period, making this a good example of the garden culture of the Mikawa area at that time, and of academic value in the history of Japanese gardens. In 2017, it was designated as a national scenic spot.

== See also ==
- List of Places of Scenic Beauty of Japan (Aichi)
