= Hiraya, Nagano =

Village in Japan

Hiraya 平谷村
- Village
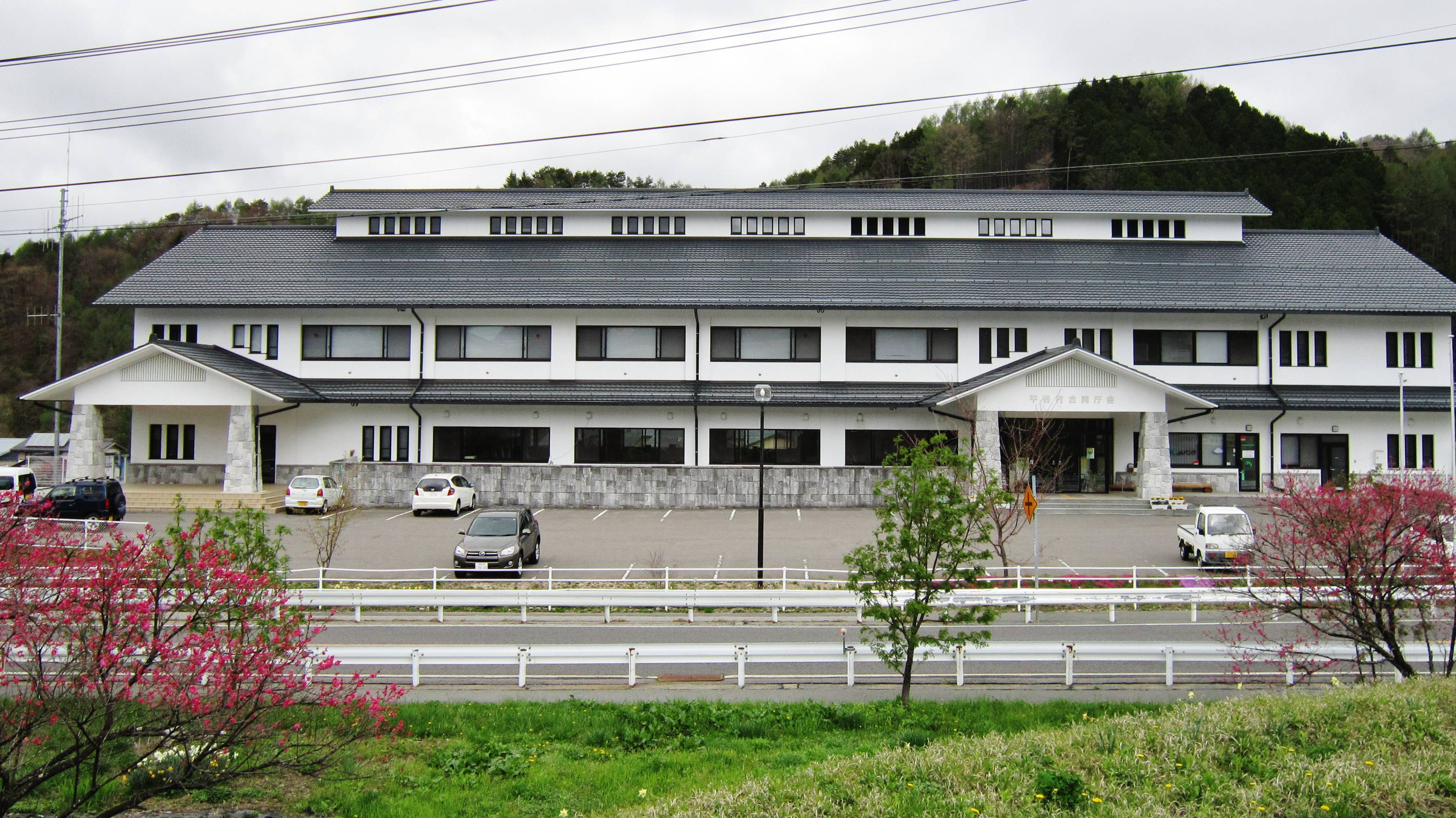
- Hiraya Village Hall

- Flag Seal

- Location of Hiraya in Nagano Prefecture

- Coordinates: 35°19′23.9″N 137°37′48.7″E
- Country: Japan
- Region: Chūbu (Kōshin'etsu)
- Prefecture: Nagano
- District: Shimoina

Area
  - Total: 77.37 km^{2} (29.87 sq mi)

Population (September 2018)
  - Total: 414
  - Density: 5.35/km^{2} (13.9/sq mi)
- Time zone: UTC+9 (Japan Standard Time)
- Symbols
  - Flower: Sunflower
- Phone number: 0265-48-2211
- Address: 1057-banchi, Hiraya-mura, Shimoina-gun, Nagano-ken 395-0601
- Website: Official website

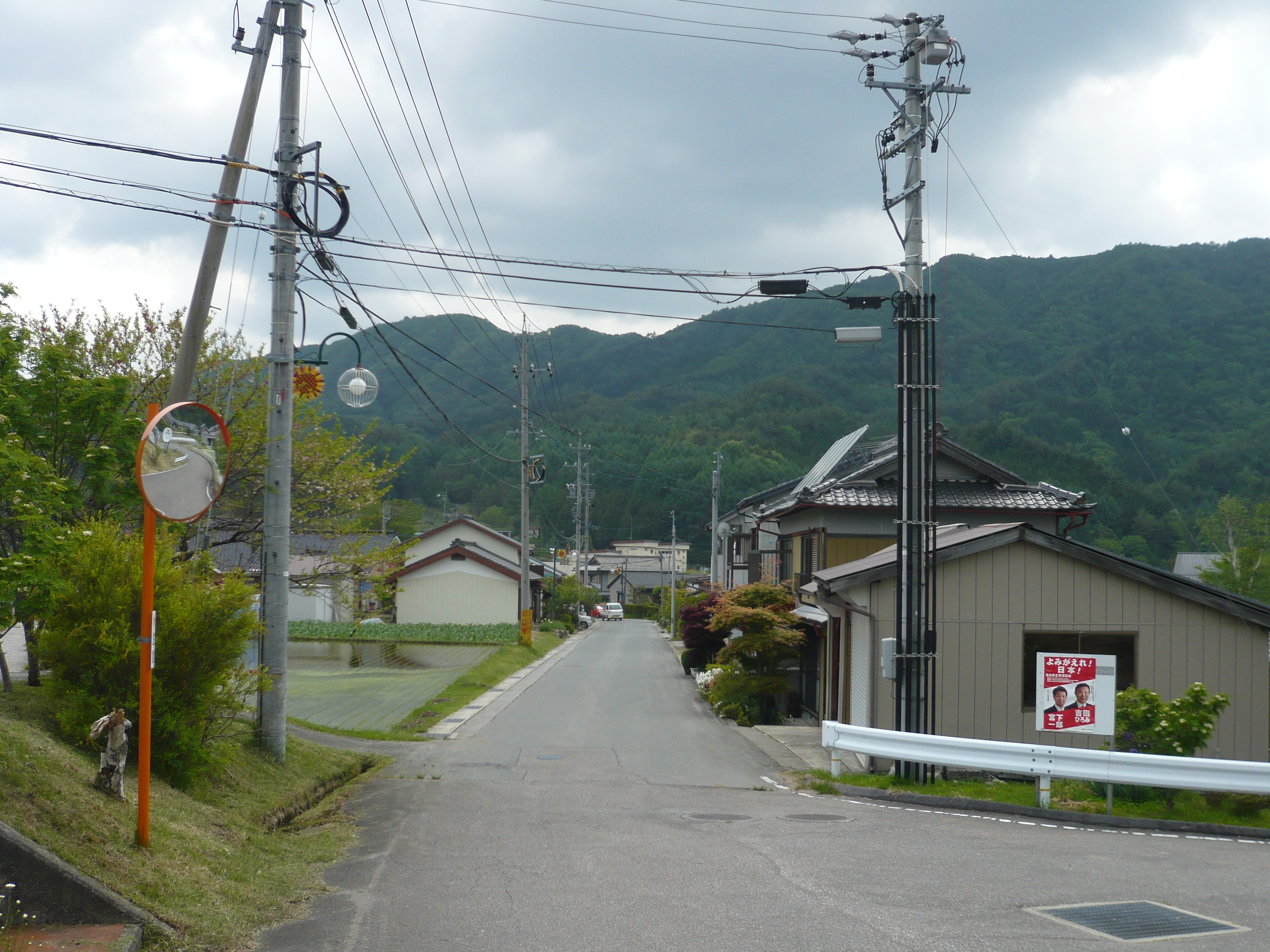
Hiraya village

Hiraya (平谷村, Hiraya-mura) is a village located in Nagano Prefecture, Japan. As of 1 September 2018, the village had an estimated population of 414 in 192 households, and a population density of 5.4 persons per km^{2}. The total area of the village is 77.37 square kilometres (29.87 sq mi).

== Geography ==
Hiraya is located in mountainous southwestern Nagano Prefecture, surrounded by 1500 meter mountains, and bordered by Gifu Prefecture to the west. Hiraya is at an average altitude of 900 meters, and contains Mount Ōkawairi and the source of the Yahagi River.

=== Surrounding municipalities ===
- Gifu Prefecture
  - Ena
  - Nakatsugawa
- Nagano Prefecture
  - Achi
  - Anan
  - Neba
  - Urugi

=== Climate ===
The village has a climate characterized by hot and humid summers, and cold winters (Köppen climate classification Cfb). The average annual temperature in Hiraya is 9.8 °C. The average annual rainfall is 2106 mm with September as the wettest month. The temperatures are highest on average in August, at around 21.8 °C, and lowest in January, at around -2.1 °C.

== Demographics ==
Per Japanese census data, the population of Hiraya has declined by more than two-thirds over the past 80 years.

Historical population
Year	Pop.	±%
1940	1,500	—
1950	1,318	−12.1%
1960	1,121	−14.9%
1970	679	−39.4%
1980	657	−3.2%
1990	617	−6.1%
2000	712	+15.4%
2010	563	−20.9%
2020	387	−31.3%

== History ==
The area of present-day Hiraya was part of ancient Shinano Province. The village of Namiai was established on April 1, 1889 by the establishment of the modern municipalities system. A portion of Namiai separated to become the village of Hiraya on April 1, 2006.

== Economy ==
The economy of Hiraya is based on tourism to its ski and hot spring resorts.

== Education ==
Hiraya has one public elementary school operated by the village government and one public middle school shared with the neighbouring village of Achi. The village does not have a high school.

== Transportation ==
=== Railway ===
- The village has no passenger railway service.

=== Highway ===
- National Route 153
- National Route 418
