= Tenryū River =

River in central Honshū, Japan

Coordinates: 34°38′54″N 137°47′27″E

Tenryū River 天竜川
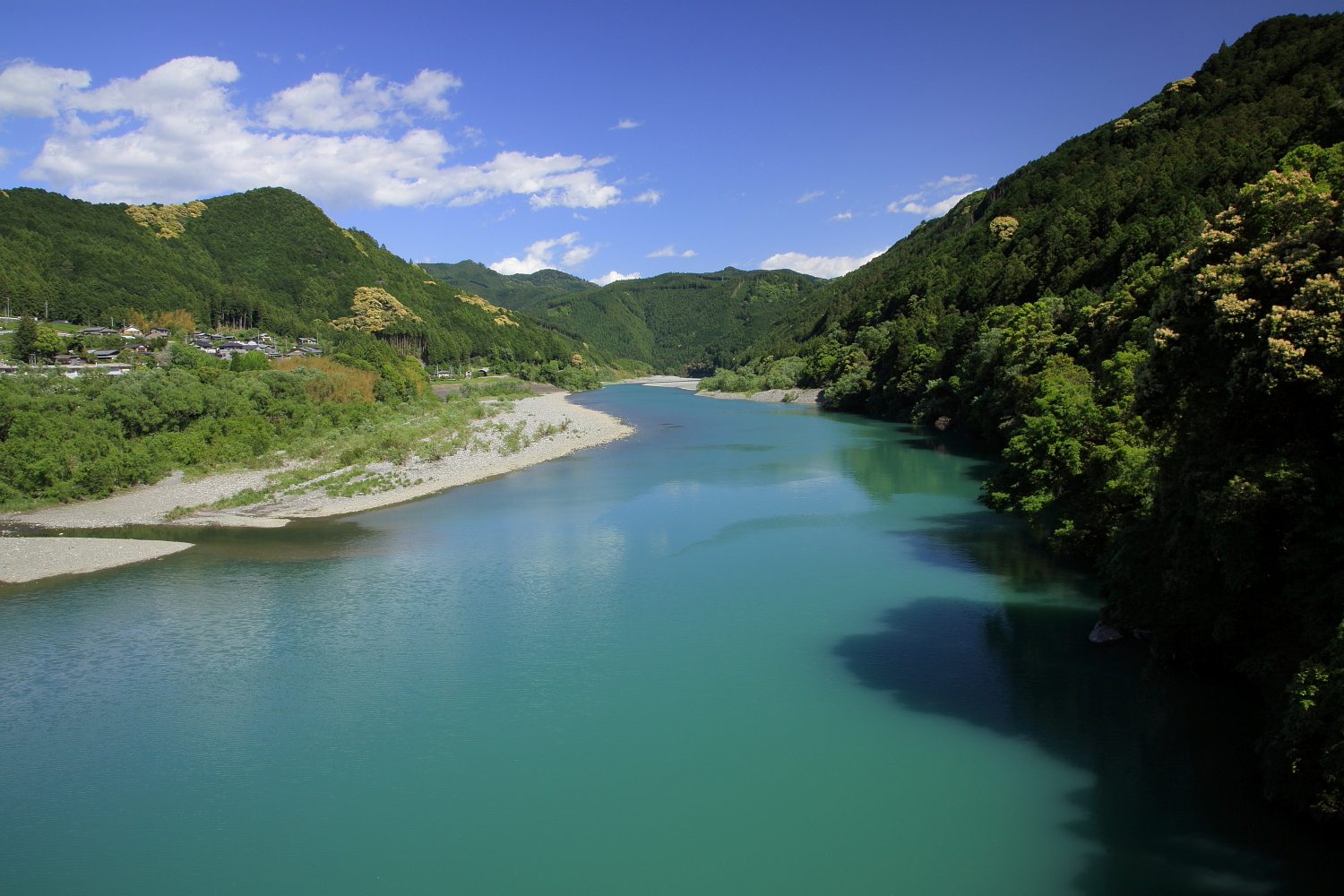
- Lower Tenryū River in Hamamatsu

- Location within Japan

Physical characteristics
- Source
  - location: Lake Suwa, Nagano Prefecture, Japan
  - elevation: 759 m (2,490 ft)
- Mouth
  - location: Enshū Sea
  - elevation: 0 m (0 ft)
- Length: 213 km (132 mi)
- Basin size: 5,050 km^{2} (1,950 sq mi)
- Discharge
  - average: 135 m^{3}/s (4,800 cu ft/s)

Basin features
- River system: Tenryū River

The Tenryū River (天竜川, Tenryū-gawa) is an A class river in central Honshū, Japan. With a length of 213 km (132 mi), it is Japan's ninth longest river.

Its source is Lake Suwa in the Kiso Mountains near Okaya in Nagano Prefecture. It then flows through Aichi Prefecture and western Shizuoka Prefecture.

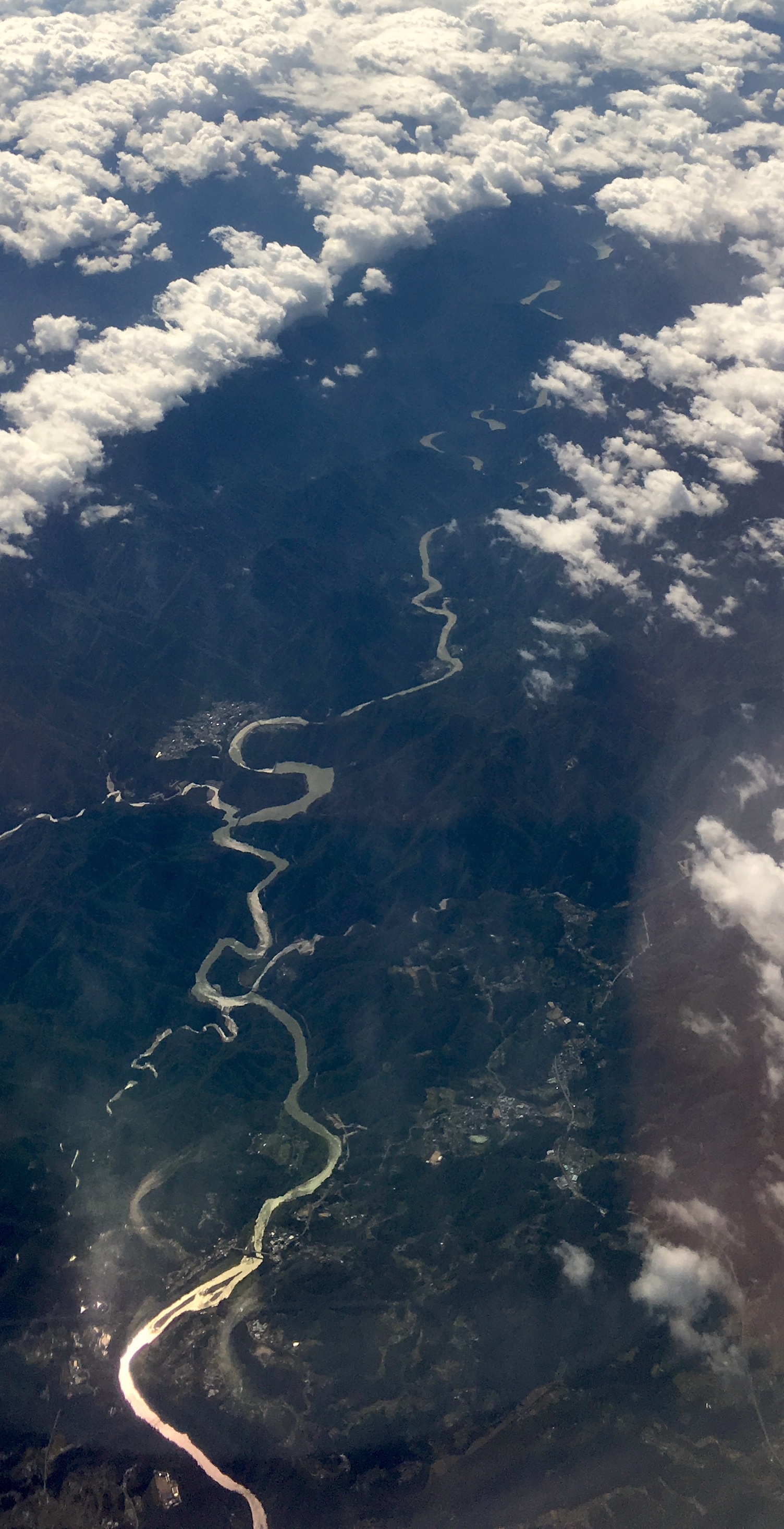
From the air, 2016

== Geography ==
The Tenryū River is the only river exiting Lake Suwa. It follows a generally southern course. The upper reaches of the river in the Ina Basin of Nagano Prefecture are a rich agricultural area. The river exits through a gap between the Kiso Mountains (Central Alps) and the Akaishi Mountains (Southern Alps), which forms the border between Shizuoka and Nagano Prefectures. This area is characterized by heavy rainfall (up to 3,000 mm (120 in) per year) and deep V-shaped valleys. Continuing south through Shizuoka Prefecture, the river drains a wide coastal plain noted for fruit and rice production. The city of Hamamatsu is near the river mouth at the Enshū Sea.

== History ==
The Tenryū River is mentioned in Nara period records as the Violent Tenryū (暴れ天竜, Abare-Tenryū) for its fast, turbulent flow and its propensity to flood. The upper portion of the river (in Shinano Province) was referred to as the Tenryūgawa, whereas the lower portion (in Tōtōmi Province) was often referred to as the Aratama River (麁玉川, Aratama-gawa). In various entries in the national historical chronicle Shoku Nihongi, flooding of the river is mentioned in the years 710 CE and 765 CE. Records through the Heian period and Kamakura period are sparse, but from the Muromachi period, increasing efforts at flood control were made by various warlords and landholders along the river by construction of dikes, levees, and channels.

With the occupation of Hamamatsu Castle by Tokugawa Ieyasu, considerable efforts were made to increase the revenues of Tōtōmi Province through creation of new rice fields with irrigation from the Tenryū River. However, flooding remained a problem, including a great flood in 1674 which washed away many of the earthen works of previous centuries.

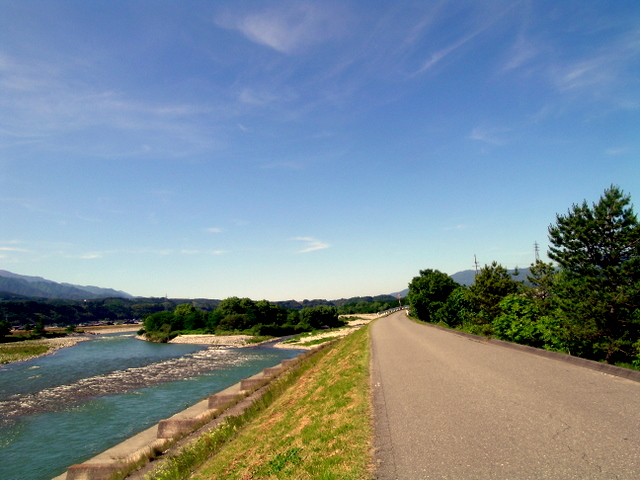
The Tenryū River

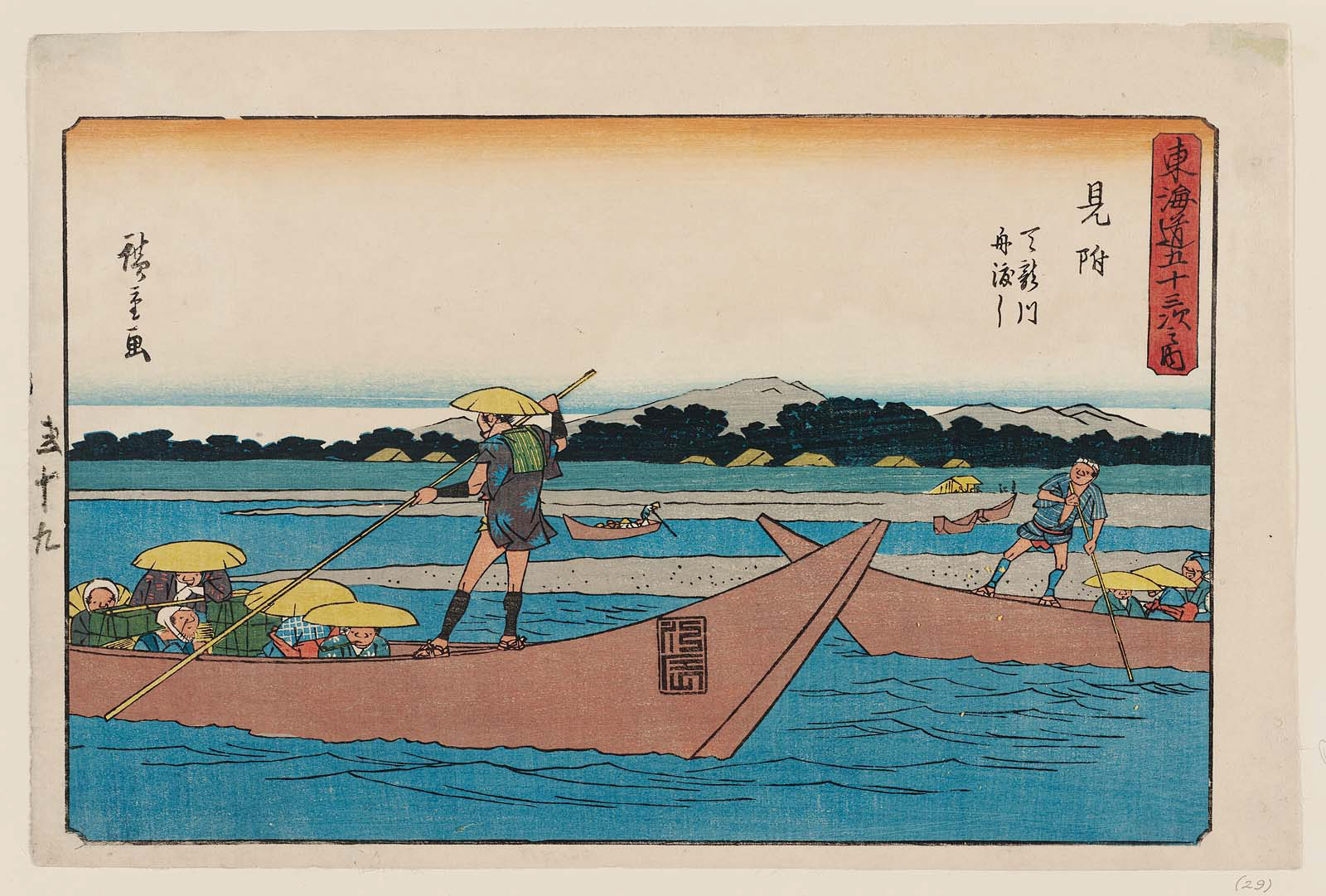
Hiroshige

=== Transport ===
During the Edo period, the Tōkaidō (road) developed as the major highway linking Edo with Kyoto, and daimyōs from the western domains were forced to travel on a regular basis to Edo to attend to the shōgun in a system known as sankin-kōtai. However, the Tokugawa shogunate prohibited the building of bridges over major rivers as a security measure. As depicted in contemporary ukiyo-e prints by artists such as Hokusai, travelers crossed the river on ferryboats, as the current was too fast and too deep for fording. In cases of bad weather or high waters, they were forced to stay several days (or even several weeks) beside the river at post stations (shukuba) such as Mitsuke-juku.

The river was bridged shortly after the Meiji Restoration by road and railroad bridges. Today the Tōkaidō Shinkansen express train crosses the river in a few seconds.

== Hydroelectric development ==
The potential of the Tenryū River valley for hydroelectric power development was realized by the Meiji government at the start of the 20th century. The Tenryū River was characterized by a high volume of flow and a fast current. Its mountainous upper reaches and tributaries were areas of steep valleys and abundant rainfall, and were sparsely populated. However, the bulk of investment in hydroelectric power generation in the region was centered on the Ōi River, and it was not until the Taishō period that development began on the Tenryū River.

Private entrepreneur Fukuzawa Momosuke founded the Tenryūgawa Electric Power (天竜川電力, Tenryūgawa Denroku), which later became Yahagi Hydroelectric (矢作水力, Yahagi Suiroku) before it was nationalized into the pre-war government monopoly Japan Electric Generation and Transmission Company (日本発送電株式会社, Nippon Hassoden K.K.) in 1938. The first dam on the main stream of the Tenryū River, the Yasuoka Dam was completed in 1935. This was followed by the Iwakura Dam in 1938. The Hiraoka Dam was started in 1938, but completed until 1951 due to the start of World War II.

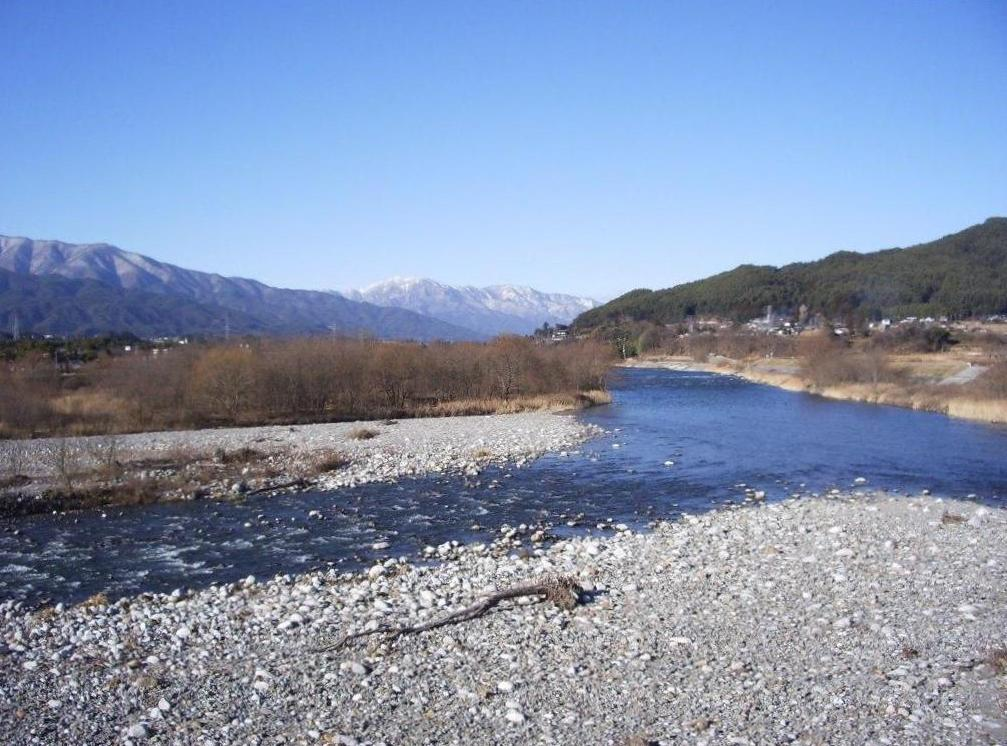
Tenryū river, upper reaches

After the end of World War II, the American occupation authorities ordered the dissolution of Nippon Hassoden, which was divided into regional power companies. Central Japan came under Chubu Electric Power, which inherited the various dams and projects on the Tenryū River, all of which were located in Nagano Prefecture. For develop of the hydroelectric potential of the river in Shizuoka Prefecture, the government turned to the Electric Power Development Company. The new company, in part through foreign aid loans from the United Nations, and with the use of new dam technologies completed the huge Sakuma Dam in the 1956, at the time the 10th largest in the world. Further dams were completed in the 1960s and 1970s until the completion of the Funagira Dam in 1976 brought development of the Tenryū River to a close.

=== Environmental consequences ===
These dams have altered the once abundant flow of the Tenryū River, and the lower reaches of the river near its mouth are almost dry.

This has had the unexpected effect of greatly increased erosion on the coastline of Shizuoka Prefecture, near Hamamatsu, especially around the Nakatajima Sand Dunes. Meanwhile, at the same time, the vast amount of sand and silt trapped in various dams upstream have resulted in greatly lowered operational lives than originally projected. Methods to increase dredging in dams and to channel the silt and sand downstream to the ocean via a series of pipelines have been explored.

== Tourism ==
The Tenryū River Valley is partially within the Tenryū-Okumikawa Quasi-National Park with the Tenryūkyō Gorge as a nationally designated Place of Scenic Beauty in Iida, Nagano Prefecture, Japan.

The Tenryū Hamanako Railroad Tenryū Hamanako Line runs along the lower reaches of the Tenryū River valley, whereas the Iida Line runs along the upper reaches of the river into upper Shizuoka and Nagano prefectures, with a stop at Sakuma Station near the namesake dam.

== See also ==
- Tenryū-class cruiser, led by Japanese cruiser Tenryū
- Japanese Alps
