= Atera Seven Falls =

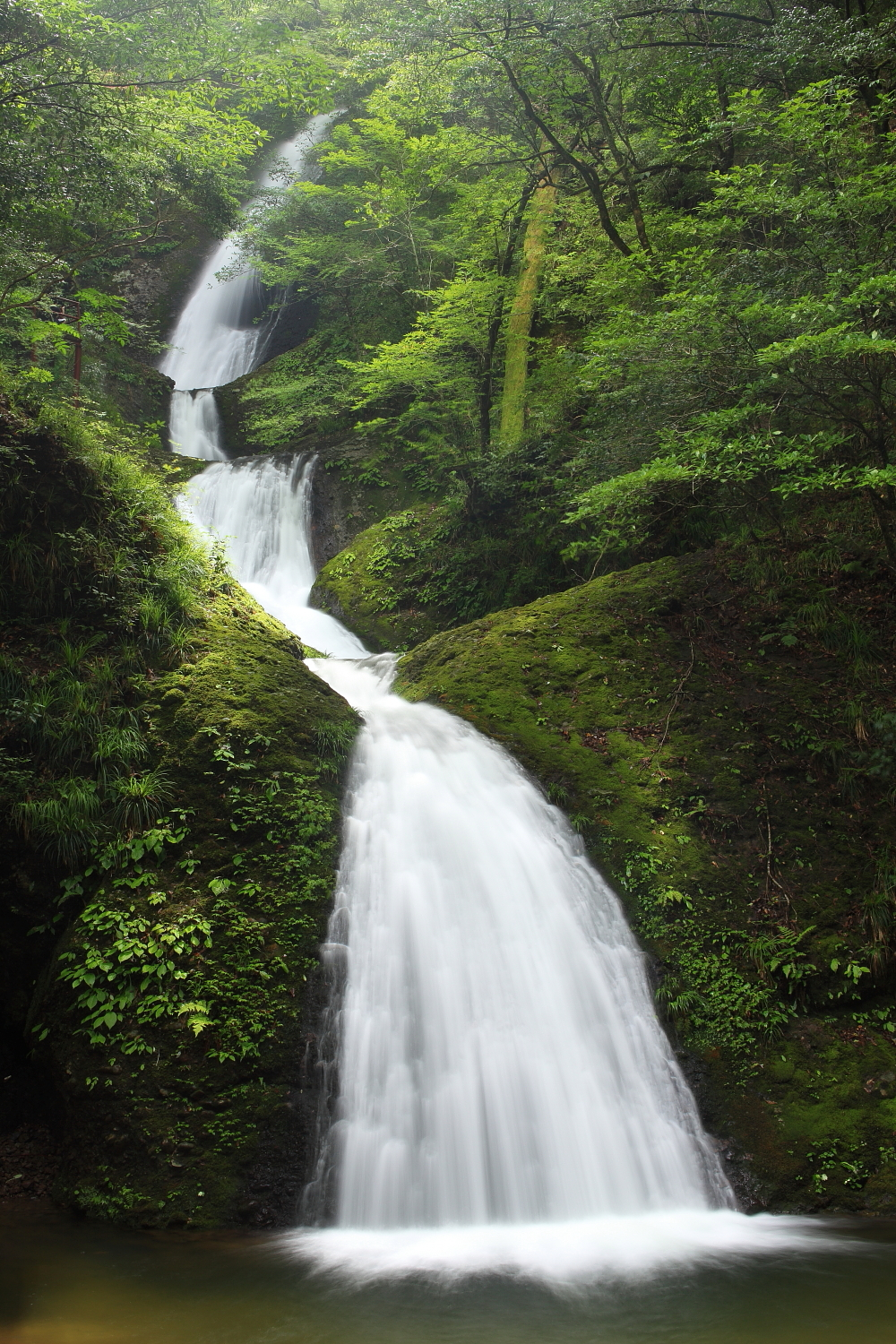

- Location within Aichi Prefecture Location within Japan
- Location: Shinshiro, Aichi, Japan
- Coordinates: 34°57′02″N 137°38′44″E
- Type: multi-tier
- Total height: 26 m (85 ft)
- Number of drops: 7
- Watercourse: Atera River
- National Palace of Scenic Beauty Natural Monument

Atera Seven Falls (阿寺の七滝, Atera-no-nana-taki) is a waterfall in the city of Shinshiro, Aichi Prefecture, Japan. It has been protected as both a Place of Scenic Beauty and Natural Monument since 1934. The waterfalls was named one of "Japan’s Top 100 Waterfalls", in a listing published by the Japanese Ministry of the Environment in 1990.

== Overview ==
The Atera Seven Falls are located on the Atera branch of the Toyokawa River within the Tenryū-Okumikawa Quasi-National Park. As the river flows down from the Nasuyama Plateau, it crosses a conglomerate fault scarp composed of middle and Paleozoic rock gravel such as sandstone, mudstone and granite. The falls are broken into a series of composed of middle and Paleozoic rock gravel such as sandstone, mudstone and granite. The first waterfall has a height of 9 metres (30 ft) from the bottom. The second is 13 metres (43 ft), the third is 7 metres (23 ft), the fourth waterfall is 25 metres (82 ft), the fifth waterfall is 2 metres (6 ft 7 in), the sixth waterfall is 4 metres (13 ft), the seventh waterfall is 2 metres (6 ft 7 in), for a total length of 62 metres (203 ft) over a drop in elevation of 26 metres (85 ft). Only the first four tiers can be seen from below. The force of the falling water has created basins at the base of each fall, especially the second waterfall, which has a depth of 4 metres (13 ft) and the fifth fall which has a depth of 7 metres (23 ft).

According to legend, a young onmyōji Abe no Seimei named this waterfall when he came here to meditate during the early Heian period.

== See also ==
- List of waterfalls
- List of waterfalls in Japan
- List of Places of Scenic Beauty of Japan (Aichi)
