= Sakuma Dam =

Dam on the Tenryū River in Japan

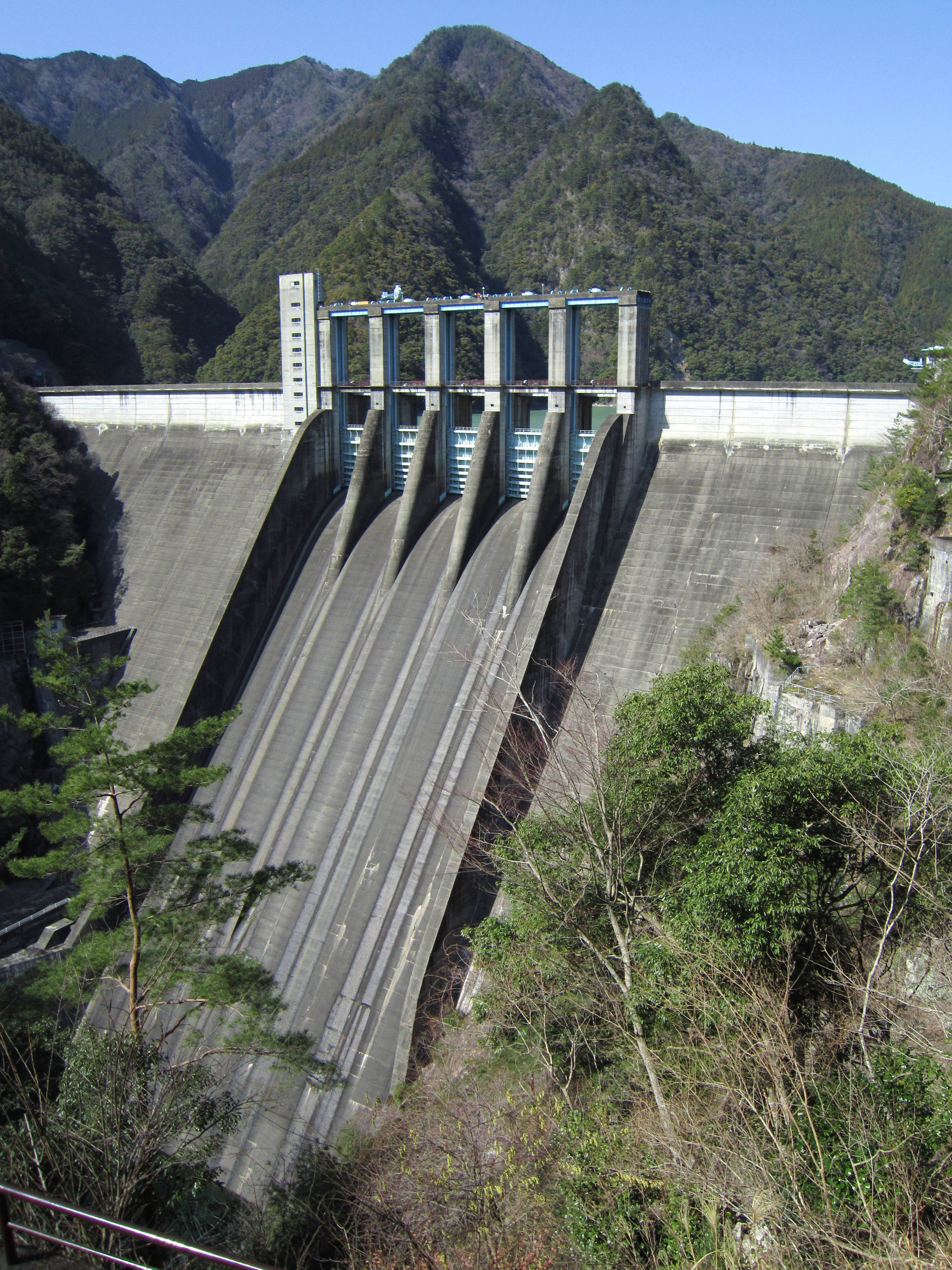
- Interactive map of Sakuma Dam
- Official name: 佐久間ダム
- Country: Japan
- Location: Shizuoka Prefecture-Aichi Prefecture Japan
- Coordinates: 35°05′58″N 137°47′39″E
- Purpose: Power generation Flood control (after redevelopment)
- Status: Operational
- Construction began: 1952
- Opening date: 1957
- Operator: Electric Power Development Company

Dam and spillways
- Type of dam: Gravity dam
- Impounds: Tenryū River
- Height: 155.5 meters
- Length: 293.5 meters
- Dam volume: 1,120,000 m^{3}

Reservoir
- Creates: Lake Sakuma
- Total capacity: 326,848,000 m^{3}
- Catchment area: 4156.5 km^{2}
- Surface area: 715 hectares

Sakuma Power Station Shin Toyoshi Power Station

The Sakuma Dam (佐久間ダム, Sakuma damu) is a dam on the Tenryū River, located on the border of Toyone, Kitashitara District, Aichi Prefecture on the island of Honshū, Japan. It is one of the tallest dams in Japan and supports a 350 MW hydroelectric power station. Nearby a frequency converter station is installed, allowing interchange of power between Japan's 50 Hz and 60 Hz AC networks.

== History ==
The potential of the Tenryū River valley for hydroelectric power development was realized by the Meiji government at the start of the 20th century. The Tenryū River was characterized by a high volume of flow and a fast current. Its mountainous upper reaches and tributaries were areas of steep valleys and abundant rainfall, and were sparsely populated. However, the bulk of investment in hydroelectric power generation in the region was centered on the Ōi River, and it was not until the Taishō period that development began on the Tenryū River. Private entrepreneur Fukuzawa Momosuke founded the Tenryūgawa Electric Power (天竜川電力, Tenryūgawa Denroku), which later became Yasaku Hydroelectric (矢作水力電気, Yasaku Suiroku Denki) before it was nationalized into the pre-war government monopoly Japan Electric Generation and Transmission Company (日本発送電株式会社, Nippon Hassoden K.K.) in 1938. The first dam on the main stream of the Tenryu River, the Yasuoka Dam was completed in 1935. This was followed by the Iwakura Dam in 1938. The Hiraoka Dam was started in 1938, but not completed until 1951 due to the start of World War II.

After the end of World War II, the American occupation authorities ordered the dissolution of Nippon Hassoden, which was divided into regional power companies. Central Japan came under Chubu Electric Power, which inherited the various dams and projects on the Tenryū River, all of which were located in Nagano Prefecture. To tap into the hydroelectric potential of the river in Shizuoka Prefecture, the government turned to the Electric Power Development Company. The new company, in part through foreign aid loans from the United Nations, began work on a new dam in 1952, based on plans which had begun as early as 1921. The main contractor for the project was Hazama Corporation, and construction was completed in 1956. Construction was facilitated by the steep V-shaped walls of the site, and its proximity to the Iida Line train (several stations of which had to be relocated once the reservoir began to fill. Construction also involved the relocation of 240 households with 296 families. The official opening ceremonies on October 28, 1957 were attended by Emperor Hirohito and Empress Kojun and was the occasion for the issuance of a commemorative postage stamp.

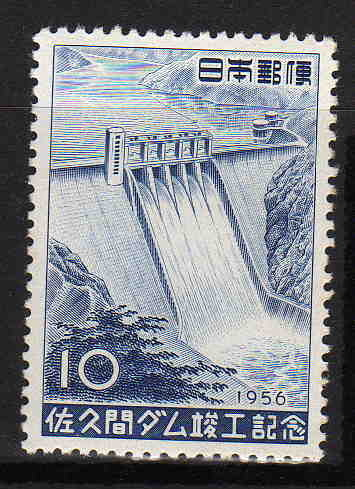
Commemorative postage stamp on completion of Sakuma Dam

== Design ==
Sakuma Dam is a hollow-core concrete gravity dam with several central spillways. It supplies water to both the Sakuma Hydroelectric Power Station and serves as the lower reservoir for the Shin-Toyone Hydroelectric Power Station, with a rated capacity of 350,000 kW and 1,200,000 kW respectively.

== Surroundings ==
The Sakuma Dam Reservoir is a popular attraction for canoeing and camping, due to its proximity to downtown Hamamatsu and ease of access. The surrounding area is part of the Tenryū-Okumikawa Quasi-National Park.

== HVDC frequency converter ==
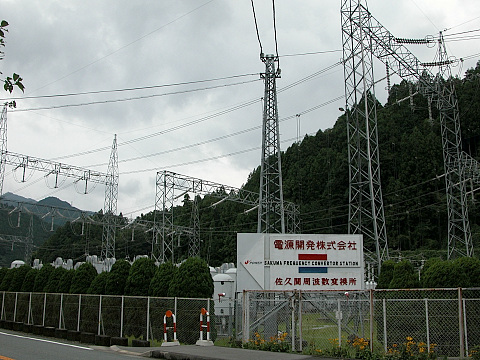
Sakuma HVDC Back-to-Back Station

The western part of Japan uses 60 Hz and the eastern part uses 50 Hz as power grid frequency. In 1965 an HVDC back-to-back station was installed in the city about 1 kilometre south of the power plant (35°04′57″N 137°47′56″E). It was rated 300 MW with an operating voltage of ±125 kV. The converter station is connected to the 275 kV 50 Hz grid and the 275 kV level of the 60 Hz grid. Initially the converter used mercury arc valves manufactured by ASEA. In 1993 it was converted to use light triggered thyristors, which were installed in the same valve hall that had contained the mercury arc valves.

Each inverter consists of two series-connected six pulse inverters forming a twelve pulse inverter. As in many other HVDC facilities, quadrivalves (serial connections of four valves forming a unit) are used. Each valve consists of 7 series-connected thyristors designed for a current of 2,500 A and a blocking voltage of 6 kV. Each of the two inverters uses 84 thyristors.

The station has three transformers on the 60 Hz side. One transformer is the power supply of the station, and two 275 kV/55 kV transformers feed the valves. The transformers have their low-voltage windings connected one in a delta and other in a wye. All these transformers share a common tank. On the 50 Hz side, two 275/54 kV transformers, in separate tanks, feed the valves, again with one in delta and the other in star connection of the low-voltage windings.

The DC smoothing reactor has an inductance of 0.12 H and is designed for a current of 2,400 A.

On each side filters for the 5th, 7th, 11th and 13th harmonic exist, which consist of a series connection of a capacitor, an inductor and a resistor. In addition, a high pass filter is used, which consists of a capacitor switched in series with a coil to which a resistor is switched in parallel.
