= Iwakura Dam =

Coordinates: 35°17′2″N 137°42′31″E

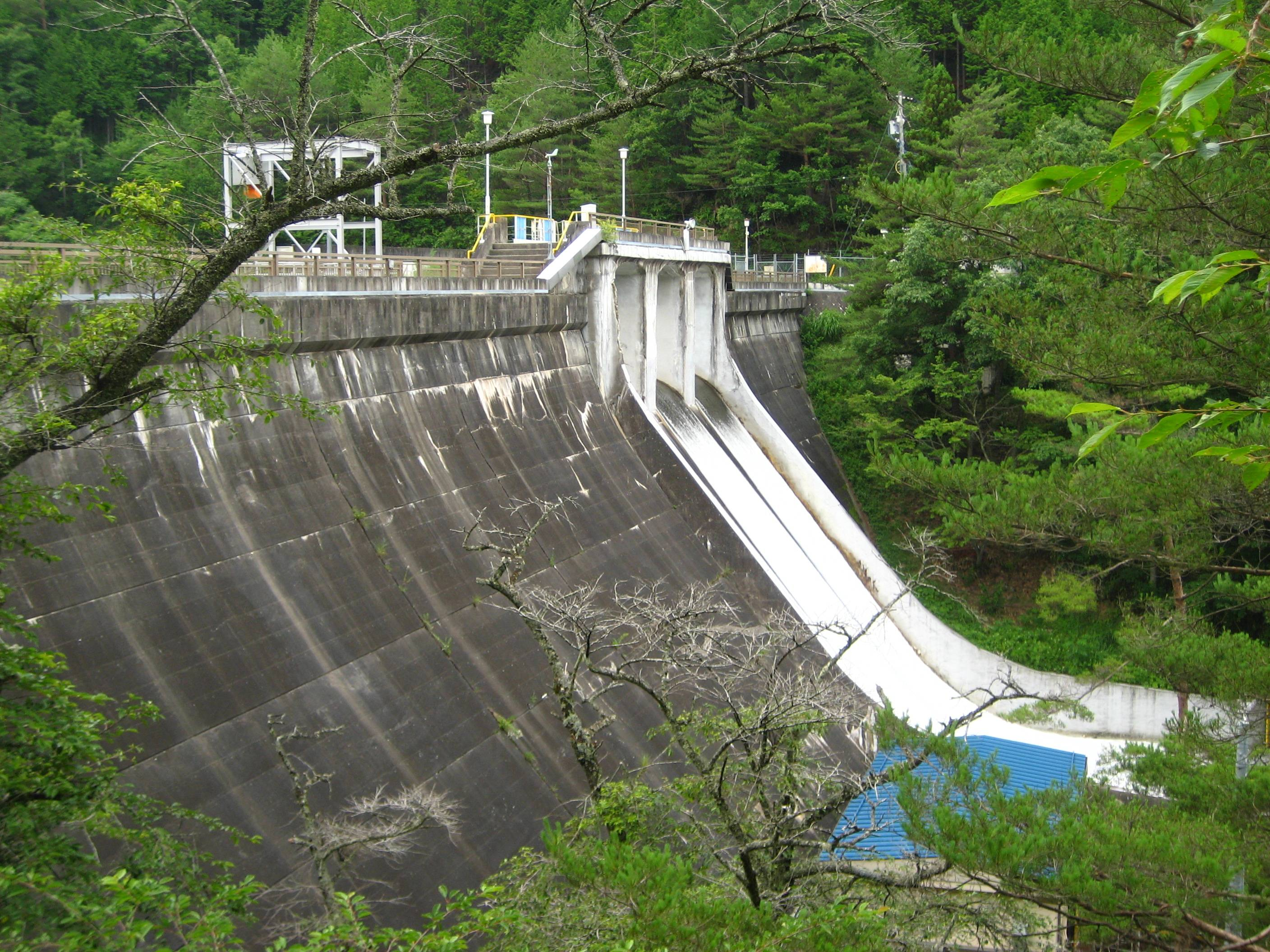
- Interactive map of Iwakura Dam
- Location: Urugi, Nagano, Japan
- Construction began: 1935
- Opening date: 1936

Dam and spillways
- Height: 25 m (82 ft)
- Length: 100.6 m (330 ft)
- Dam volume: 19,000 m^{3}

Reservoir
- Total capacity: 435,000 m^{3}
- Catchment area: 8.8 km^{2}
- Surface area: 6 ha

Iwakura Dam (Japanese: 岩倉ダム) is a dam in Urugi, Nagano Prefecture, Japan, completed in 1936.
