= Japan National Route 418 =

Road in Japan

National Route 418
- 国道418号
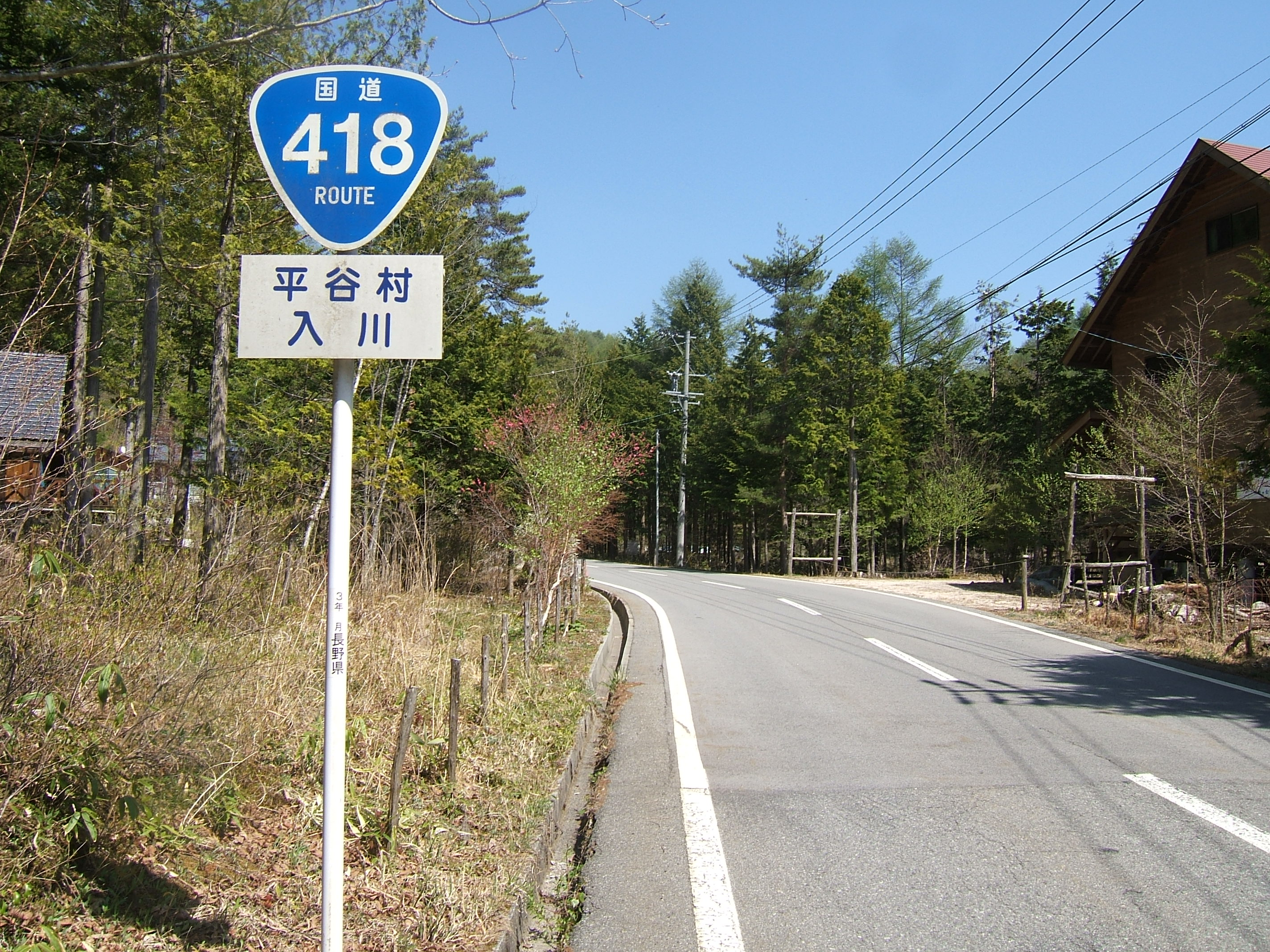

Route information
- Length: 243.3 km (151.2 mi)

Location
- Country: Japan

Highway system
- National highways of Japan; Expressways of Japan
← National Route 417	→ National Route 419

National Route 418 is a national highway of Japan connecting Ōno, Fukui and Iida, Nagano in Japan, with a total length of 243.3 km (151.2 mi).
