= Tenryū-Okumikawa Quasi-National Park =

Protected area in Japan

- 天竜奥三河国定公園
- IUCN category V (protected landscape/seascape)
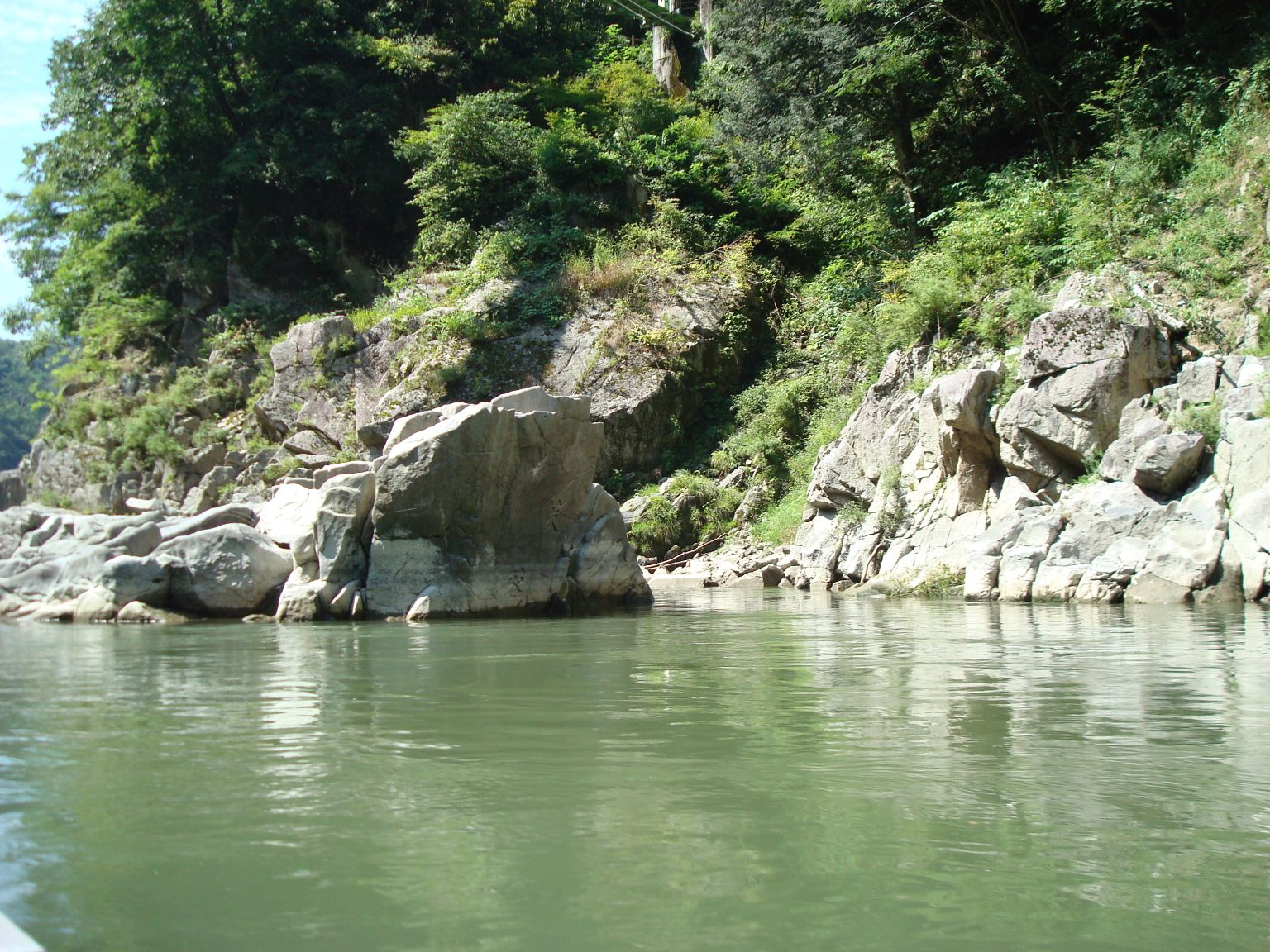
- Tenryū-kyō Gorge in Iida, Nagano prefecture

- Location within Japan
- Location: Honshū, Japan
- Coordinates: 35°16′N 137°50′E
- Area: 25,756 ha (63,640 acres)
- Established: October 1, 1969
- Governing body: Aichi, Nagano and Shizuoka prefectural governments

Tenryū-Okumikawa Quasi-National Park (天竜奥三河国定公園, Tenryū-Okumikawa Kokutei Kōen) is a quasi-national park in the Tōkai region of Honshū in Japan. It is rated a protected landscape (category V) according to the IUCN. The park includes the Tenryū-kyō Gorge of the upper Tenryū River in Iida, Sakuma Dam and its surrounding forests, Atera Seven Falls, Chausu Mountains and Mount Horaiji. It straddles the border between Shizuoka, Aichi and Nagano Prefectures. The area was designated a quasi-national park on October 1, 1969.

Like all Quasi-National Parks in Japan, the park is managed by the local prefectural governments.

== See also ==
- List of national parks of Japan
