= September 2017 Democratic Party (Japan, 2016) leadership election =

Political party election in Japan

September 2017 Democratic Party leadership election
- 1 September 2017
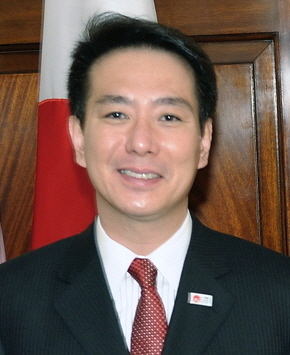

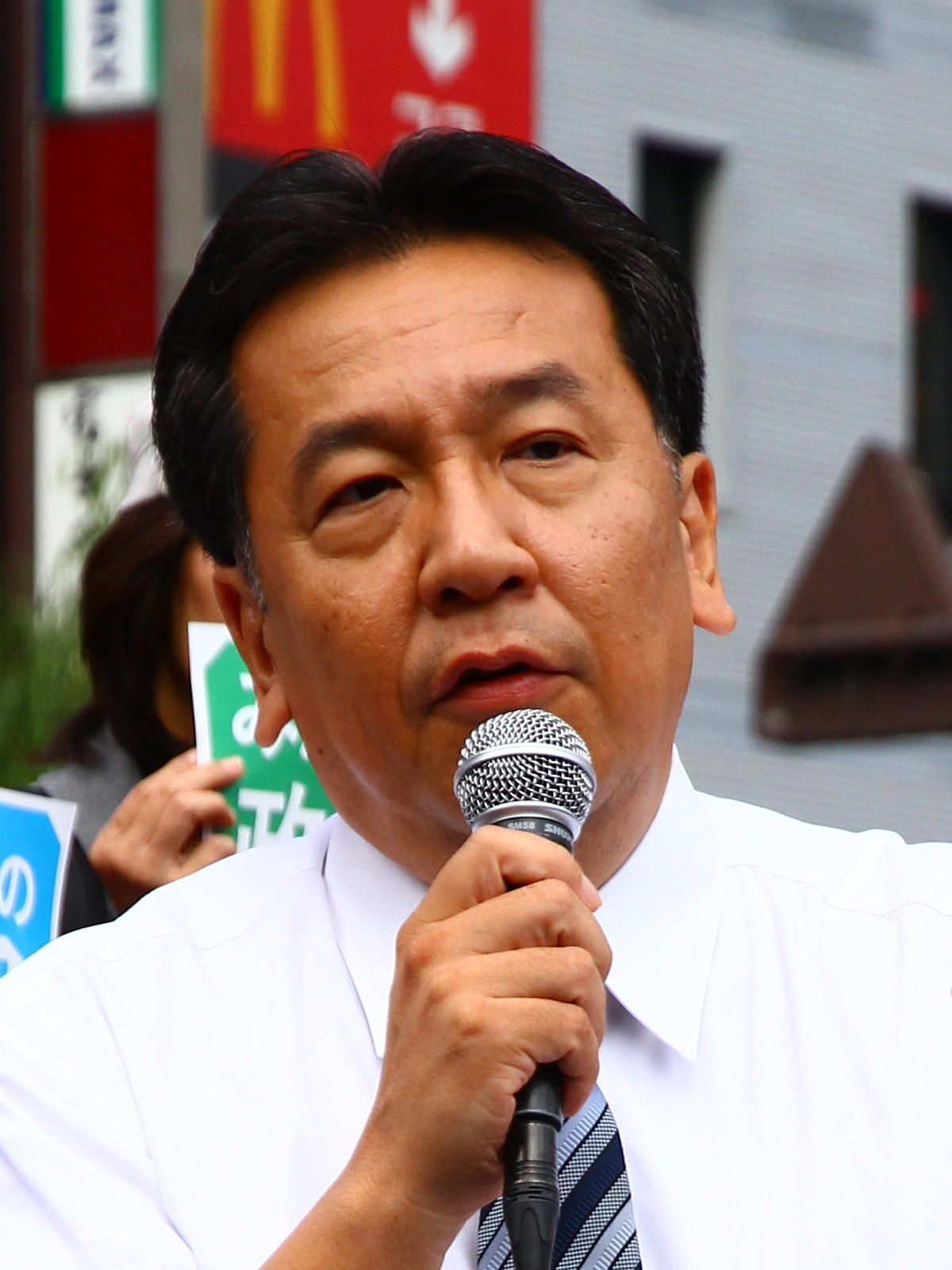
Candidate	Seiji Maehara	Yukio Edano
Leader's seat	Kyoto 2nd	Saitama 5th
Diet members	166	102
Party members	137	94
Local assembly	115	94
Candidates	84	42
Total points	502 (60.2%)	332 (39.8%)
- Map of the results of the party member vote.
President before election
Renhō
Elected President
Seiji Maehara

The September 2017 Democratic Party leadership election was held on 1 September 2017 to replace outgoing president Renhō, who resigned in July after the party's failure in the 2017 Tokyo prefectural election.

Seiji Maehara, the runner up in the 2016 contest, defeated Yukio Edano by a wide margin. Maehara's success was a victory for the conservative wing of the party, but also precipitated an internal crisis that resulted in a split in the party only a month later.

== Background ==
Renhō was elected president in September 2016. As a younger and more vibrant face, it was hoped that she would improve the DP's poor standing, but they continued to languish in the polls and suffer from internal strife. Ahead of the July 2017 Tokyo prefectural election, more than a dozen DP candidates defected to Tomin First, significantly damaging the party. High-profile party member Akihisa Nagashima also left the party, as did Kenzo Fujisue. The DP went on to win only five seats in the Tokyo Metropolitan Assembly, down from fifteen in the previous election and their worst-ever performance. Renhō and secretary-general Yoshihiko Noda acknowledged the defeat but gave no indication of resigning. Renhō also continued to be pursued over claims she had failed to renounce her Taiwanese citizenship. To refute the allegations, on 18 July she disclosed part of her family register and a certificate confirming her renunciation, but pressure on her leadership remained.

At a meeting of the DP caucus on 25 July, Noda announced his resignation. Renhō stated she would quickly appoint a successor to look ahead to the House of Representatives election, due to take place within the next year. She voiced her intention to leave the House of Councillors and seek election to a district in Tokyo in the next election. Two days later on the 27th, she announced her resignation as president: "I have decided that the best course of action is for a new executive team to lead a stronger Democratic Party. ... I also reflected on my shortcomings and took the whole picture into consideration. I lacked leadership skills."

== Electoral system ==
On 28 July, the party executive decided that the election would use the comprehensive points-based procedure, rather than a simple caucus vote as permitted under the party statutes.

Candidates were required to gather endorsements from twenty (maximum 25) of the party's members of the National Diet in order to stand.

The election was conducted via a points system:

- Each of the party's members of the National Diet had a vote worth two points. (290 points total)
- Registered party members or supporters could vote via mail. Points for this tier were distributed between the 47 prefectures, and awarded to candidates in proportion to votes won in each prefecture. (231 points total)
- Each of the party's members of local councils or prefectural assemblies could vote via mail. Points for this tier were awarded to candidates in proportion to votes won. (209 points total)
- Each of the party's approved candidates for future Diet elections had a vote worth one point. (128 points total)

In order to win, a candidate must secure more than 50% of points. If no candidate won more than 50%, a runoff was to be held the same day. In the runoff, only Diet members and approved candidates could vote. Nominations were taken on 21 August and the election held on 1 September.

== Candidates ==
Candidate	Offices held
Seiji Maehara (age 55); Kyoto Prefecture	Member of the House of Representatives (1993–); President of the Democratic Party of Japan (2005–06); Minister for Foreign Affairs (2010–11)
Yukio Edano (age 53); Saitama Prefecture	Member of the House of Representatives (1993–); Chief Cabinet Secretary (2011); Minister of Economy, Trade and Industry (2011–12)

=== Sponsors ===
Seiji Maehara (25)	Yukio Edano (23)
House of Representatives: Tomoko Abe; Yutaka Banno; Motohisa Furukawa; Kazuhiro Haraguchi; Toru Kikawada; Makiko Kikuta; Keiro Kitagami; Yasuko Komiyama; Yoshio Maki; Kenko Matsuki; Yorihisa Matsuno; Atsushi Oshima; Takashi Shinohara; Eiichiro Washio; Shu Watanabe; House of Councillors: Shinya Adachi; Takanori Kawai; Naoki Kazama; Masao Kobayashi; Yukihito Koga; Hiroe Makiyama; Teruhiko Mashiko; Mitsuru Sakurai; Kazuya Shimba; Minoru Yanagida	House of Representatives: Hirotaka Akamatsu; Naoto Kan; Shoichi Kondo; Akira Nagatsuma; Masaharu Nakagawa; Chinami Nishimura; Katsuya Okada; Seiji Osaka; Takahiro Sasaki; Manabu Terata; Kiyomi Tsujimoto; Takahiro Yokomichi; House of Councillors: Kumiko Aihara; Yoshifu Arita; Takashi Esaki; Yoshio Hachiro; Michihiro Ishibashi; Masayoshi Nataniya; Motohiro Ōno; Yoshitaka Saitō; Hirokazu Shiba; Hideya Sugio; Eri Tokunaga

=== Withdrew ===
- Yosei Ide, member of the House of Representatives (2012–)

=== Declined ===
- Yuichiro Tamaki, member of the House of Representatives (2009–)
- Akira Nagatsuma, member of the House of Representatives (2000–) and Minister of Health, Labour and Welfare (2009–10)
- Kenji Eda, member of the House of Representatives (2002–03, 2005–) and president of the Japan Innovation Party (2014–15)

== Contest ==
The election was seen as a contest between the party's conservative wing, represented by Maehara, and its liberal wing, represented by Edano. The two central issues of the campaign, electoral alliances and constitutional reform, ran through this factional divide; conflict over these issues had led to the departure of prominent conservatives Nagashima in April and then Goshi Hosono on 4 August, shortly after Renhō's resignation. Maehara and Edano were both prominent leaders of the party and had served in key roles over many years, including senior cabinet positions during the DPJ government of 2009–12. Maehara previously served as president from 2005–06 and ran for the position again in 2011 and 2016. Edano was contesting his first leadership race.

The two largest issues during the contest were electoral strategy and constitutional reform. Under Renhō, the party had pursued alliances with the Communist Party to improve its chances in elections, and steadfastly opposed the Liberal Democratic government's plans to amend Article 9 of the Constitution. Edano, who as secretary-general during 2014–16 was one of the architects of these positions, pledged to continue them. Maehara opposed the alliance with the Communist Party, instead promoting cooperation with Tokyo governor Yuriko Koike, who was widely believed to have aspirations to enter national politics. Maehara was a well-known supporter of constitutional revision, though during the contest he stated his opposition to the LDP government's "hasty timetable".

Other issues included nuclear power, economic policy, and relations with Rengō. Edano supported the total phasing out of nuclear power and pledged to introduce a bill to the Diet to achieve this. Both candidates supported increased welfare expenditure, with Maehara prioritising support for the elderly and Edano calling for wage increases for nurses and caregivers. Both also supported free early childhood education. They differed on tax policy: Maehara proposed raising taxes to fund expanded programs, while Edano preferred cuts to public works and opposed any rise in the consumption tax. Relations with the major trade union federation Rengō, traditionally a major support base for the party, had also been strained due to the alliance with the Communist Party. Maehara wanted to repair ties, while Edano was seen as limited by his adherence to Renhō's policies.

Third-place finisher in the previous year's contest Yuichiro Tamaki initially intended to run again. However, he stated on 4 August that he would not stand, citing his responsibility for the party's recent failures in his role as deputy secretary-general. Former JIP leader Kenji Eda was urged by allies to run as a "third candidate," but chose not to do so. Yosei Ide ran, but withdrew on the 21st due to lack of support.

Maehara received support from several factions, including all those considered to lie on the party right. He was endorsed by the ex-DSP group around Yoshiaki Takaki on the 4th, followed on the 7th by Akihiro Ohata's faction, the ex-JIP group around Yorihisa Matsuno, and Maehara's own Ryounkai faction. This was followed by the former Hosono faction on the 9th and the former Nagashima faction on the 16th.

Edano was encouraged to run by Hirotaka Akamatsu and was endorsed by his faction of ex-JSP members. He was also supported by the Kan faction to which he belonged.

A 27 August poll from The Nikkei showed the general public preferred Maehara to Edano 41% to 28%. Among DP supporters, the two were tied on around 40%. The same poll found that 50% of DP supporters opposed the alliance with the Communist Party, compared to 30% who favoured it.

By the 22nd, the Asahi Shimbun reported that Maehara had secured support from over 80 of 143 eligible Diet members, compared to under 30 for Edano. Edano attempted to counter this by appealing to local assembly and grassroots members, pledging to establish better communication: "We should start with this election by apologizing to local assembly members and supporters who expected much from the DP." Jiji Press reported on the 27th that 14 prefectural branches were supporting Maehara while ten were backing Edano, with 23 undecided.

== Results ==
Maehara won 502 of 834 points compared to Edano's 332, giving him a clear victory. He won 83 (62%) of the 134 votes cast by Diet members and 67% support from approved candidates. Eight members cast invalid votes, of which seven were blank and one was cast for Yosei Ide. Party insiders speculated that these members planned to leave the party after the election. He won 57% support from the grassroots membership and 55% of local assembly officials.

Among the party membership, Maehara won 37 prefectures to Edano's 10, performing best in his home region of Kansai, as well as Kyushu and Chūbu. He also won Tōhoku, Chūgoku, and most of Kantō and Shikoku. Edano's strongest prefectures were Hokkaido, Mie, and Okinawa. He also outpolled Maehara in his home prefecture of Saitama and in Tokyo.

Candidate	Diet members			Party members & supporters			Local assembly members			Diet candidates			Total
Candidate	Votes	%	Points	Votes	%	Points	Votes	%	Points	Votes	%	Points	Total
Seiji Maehara	83	61.9	166	51,692	57.4	137	724	55.1	115	84	66.7	84	502
Yukio Edano	51	38.1	102	38,409	42.6	94	590	44.9	94	42	33.3	42	332
Total	134	100.0	268	90,101	100.0	231	1,314	100.0	209	126	100.0	126	834
Invalid	8			1,084			5			0			
Turnout	142	97.9		91,185	39.9		1,319	85.5		126	98.4		
Eligible	145			228,753			1,543			128			
Source: Democratic Party
