= 2015 Democratic Party of Japan leadership election =

Political party election in Japan

2015 Democratic Party leadership election
- 18 January 2015
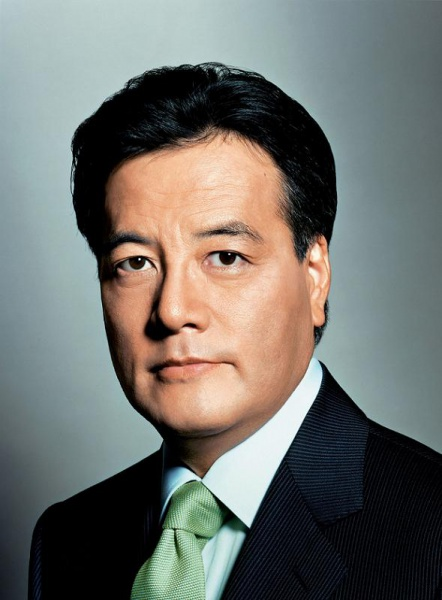

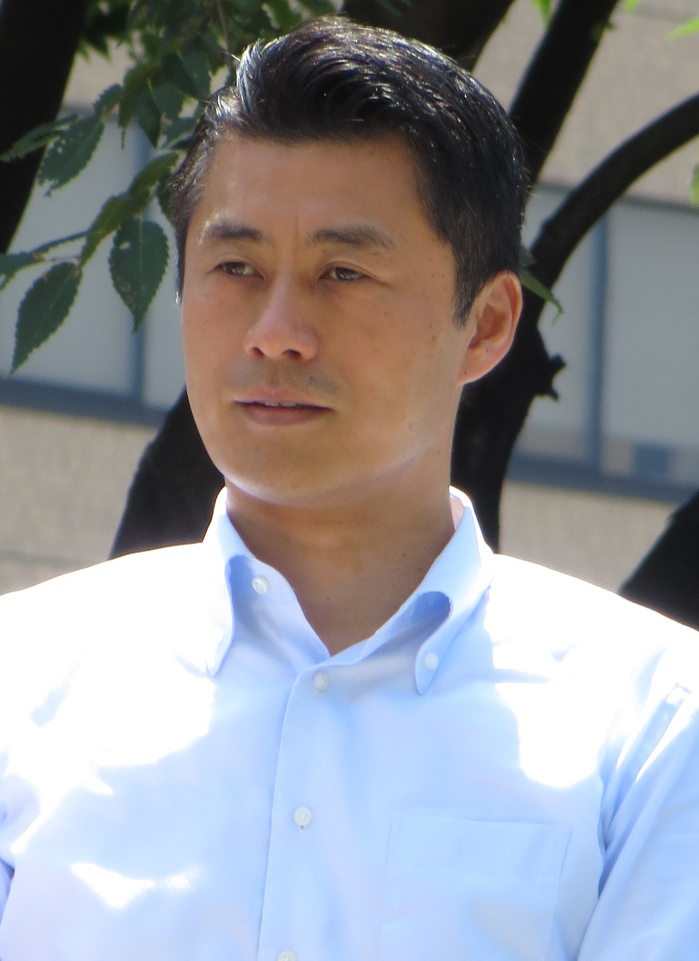

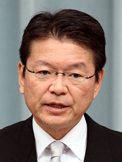
Candidate	Katsuya Okada	Goshi Hosono	Akira Nagatsuma
Leader's seat	Mie 3rd	Shizuoka 5th	Tokyo 7th
First round points	294 (38.7%)	298 (39.2%)	168 (22.1%)
Runoff points	133 (52.6%)	120 (47.4%)	Eliminated
- Map of the results of the party member vote.
President before election
Banri Kaieda
Elected President
Katsuya Okada

The 2015 Democratic Party of Japan presidential election was held on 18 January 2015. The election was held to replace outgoing president Banri Kaieda, who resigned after losing his seat in the December 2014 general election. Katsuya Okada was victorious in a close contest with Goshi Hosono after two rounds of voting, returning to the position he held from 2004 until 2005.

== Background ==
Banri Kaieda was chosen as president after the DPJ's landslide loss in the December 2012 election. The party fared equally poorly in the July 2013 upper house elections. In December 2014, Prime Minister Shinzo Abe called a snap election for the lower house for 14 December. The result was largely a repeat of the 2012 landslide, with the DPJ making only a marginal recovery. Kaieda, who stood in the Tokyo 1st district, lost to incumbent Miki Yamada and also failed to retain his seat in the Tokyo PR block, thus being ejected from the Diet. He announced his resignation as party president the following day.

== Electoral system ==
On 17 December, the party executive announced that the comprehensive points-based election procedure would be used to select the new president. This marked the first time this method had been used to fill a vacancy resulting from the resignation of a president.

Candidates were required to gather endorsements from twenty (maximum 25) of the party's members of the National Diet in order to stand.

The election was conducted via a points system:

- Each of the party's members of the National Diet had a vote worth two points. (264 points total)
- Registered party members (toin, paying a 6,000 yen annual fee) or supporters (2,000 yen annual fee) could vote via mail if they had been registered by 30 June 2014. Points for this tier were distributed between the 47 prefectures, and awarded to candidates in proportion to votes won in each prefecture. (354 points total)
- Each of the party's members of local councils or prefectural assemblies could vote via mail. Points for this tier were awarded to candidates in proportion to votes won. (141 points total)
- Each of the party's approved candidates for future Diet elections had a vote worth one point. In this election, only Daigo Matsuura (approved for Akita in the House of Councillors) qualified. (1 point total)

In order to win, a candidate must secure more than 50% of points. If no candidate won more than 50%, a runoff was to be held the same day. In the runoff, only Diet members and approved candidates could vote. Nominations were taken on 7 January and the election held on the 18th.

About 200,000 registered supporters and 30,000 toin members were eligible to vote. This was the first DPJ presidential election where the votes of grassroots members outweighed those of the Diet caucus.

== Candidates ==
Candidate	Offices held
Goshi Hosono (age 43); Shizuoka Prefecture	Member of the House of Representatives (2000–); Minister of the Environment (2011–12)
Katsuya Okada (age 61); Mie Prefecture	Member of the House of Representatives (1990–); President of the Democratic Party of Japan (2004–05); Minister for Foreign Affairs (2008–09)
Akira Nagatsuma (age 54); Tokyo	Member of the House of Representatives (2000–); Minister of Health, Labour and Welfare (2009–10)

=== Sponsors ===
Katsuya Okada (25)	Goshi Hosono (25)	Akira Nagatsuma (25)
House of Representatives: Tomoko Abe; Jun Azumi; Hirofumi Hirano; Yōsuke Kondō; Kazuko Kōri; Takahiro Kuroiwa; Masaharu Nakagawa; Chinami Nishimura; Yoshihiko Noda; Mitsunori Okamoto; Soichiro Okuno; Koichi Takemasa; Manabu Terata; Kiyomi Tsujimoto; House of Councillors: Shinya Adachi; Tetsuro Fukuyama; Toshimi Kitazawa; Masao Kobayashi; Kiyoshige Maekawa; Masayuki Naoshima; Katsuya Ogawa; Tsutomu Okubo; Renhō; Hirokazu Shiba; Mitsuyoshi Yanagisawa	House of Representatives: Nobuyuki Fukushima; Kenta Izumi; Toru Kikawada; Sumio Mabuchi; Jin Matsubara; Takeaki Matsumoto; Takeshi Miyazaki; Akihisa Nagashima; Rintaro Ogata; Junya Ogawa; Kensuke Onishi; Takako Suzuki; Issei Tajima; Eiichiro Washio; Shiori Yamao; House of Councillors: Yuichiro Hata; Toshiyuki Kato; Hiroe Makiyama; Motohiro Ōno; Kohei Otsuka; Mitsuru Sakurai; Kazuya Shimba; Yataro Tsuda; Minoru Yanagida; Misako Yasui	House of Representatives: Hirotaka Akamatsu; Akio Fukuda; Shoichi Kondo; Katsuhito Nakajima; Akihiro Ohata; Takahiro Sasaki; Takashi Shinohara; Kaname Tajima; Kazunori Yamanoi; House of Councillors: Kumiko Aihara; Yoshifu Arita; Kenzo Fujisue; Yukihisa Fujita; Michihiro Ishibashi; Mieko Kamimoto; Naoki Kazama; Takeshi Maeda; Teruhiko Mashiko; Shunichi Mizuoka; Masayoshi Nataniya; Kuniyoshi Noda; Toshio Ogawa; Kusuo Oshima; Kaoru Tashiro; Eri Tokunaga

=== Withdrew ===
- Takashi Shinohara, member of the House of Representatives (2003–) – (endorsed Nagatsuma)
- Renhō, member of the House of Councillors (2004–) and Minister of State for Government Revitalization (2010–12) – (endorsed Okada)
- Mitsuru Sakurai, member of the House of Councillors (1998–) – (endorsed Hosono)

=== Declined ===
- Seiji Maehara, member of the House of Representatives (1993–), former President of the Democratic Party of Japan (2005–06) and Minister for Foreign Affairs (2010–11)

== Contest ==
Goshi Hosono, who served as environment minister from 2011 to 2012 and oversaw the cleanup of the Fukushima nuclear accident, was the first to declare his candidacy. Former president and policy expert Katsuya Okada, a longtime party senior, announced his run on 25 December. Former labour minister Akira Nagatsuma declared his candidacy on the 29th. The campaign revolved around how to rebuild the party, which had failed to recover in the two years since its 2012 defeat. Okada opined that "this could be the last chance for the DPJ to regain power," and advocated for stricter party discipline. A key question concerned relations with the Japan Innovation Party. Members of the party right such as Seiji Maehara advocated for a merger to strengthen the opposition, but the parties' conflicting policies, such as the JIP's strongly conservative stances and opposition to trade unions, were controversial. Hosono, who had voiced his openness to the idea prior to the election, took a more critical view during the campaign. Okada stated that a merger was impossible in the near term, but endorsed legislative and electoral cooperation.

Okada was supported by senior party members and veterans including Jun Azumi, Kōichirō Genba, and Yukio Edano. Hosono was backed by the party's conservative wing and was seen as the candidate of generational change and reform; he received support from Yuichiro Hata, Akihisa Nagashima, and Takeaki Matsumoto. Akira Nagatsuma was supported by the former JSP members around Hirotaka Akamatsu and took a progressive tack, declaring that "the only way to expand the party's influence is to raise the flag of liberalism."

Hosono supported the principle of collective self-defense. Okada suggested he could accept it "if we can find a way to limit it", while Nagatsuma was opposed. Hosono and Okada called for the government to draft robust safety plans when restarting nuclear power plants, while Nagatsuma opposed restarts altogether. All three candidates criticised Abenomics, accusing it of worsening inequality, but remained vague on an alternative vision. All three candidates advocated for increasing representation of women in the party's Diet ranks, including implementing quotas.

Takashi Shinohara had planned to run but withdrew and endorsed Nagatsuma when he announced his candidacy. Renhō also intended to run, but withdrew on 30 December citing a lack of support. Mitsuru Sakurai withdrew for the same reason on the 31st and endorsed Hosono.

Kyodo News conducted a poll on 24–25 December which showed 17.0% of the public supported Okada as leader compared to 14.6% for Hosono. Among DPJ supporters, Hosono was ahead on 23.7% vs 21.3% for Okada. An Asahi Shimbun poll from 11–12 January found 32% preferred Hosono as leader, compared to 28% for Okada and 13% for Nagatsuma. A Yomiuri Shimbun poll from the same time found 32% for Okada, 30% for Hosono, and 16% for Nagatsuma. A Jiji Press survey of Diet members on 11 January showed 44 in support of Hosono, 43 for Okada, and 31 for Nagatsuma.

== Results ==
The first round was a very close two-way race between Hosono and Okada, with Nagatsuma trailing in third. Hosono received one more vote from Diet members than Okada, and held a strong lead among local council and assembly members. In the membership vote, he also lead by about 500 votes (0.5%), but the more efficient distribution of Okada's vote resulted in a reversal, with the latter winning 148 points to Hosono's 139. Nagatsuma won 20.5% and 67 points among the membership.

In the membership vote, Hosono performed best in his home prefecture of Shizuoka, as well as Iwate, Gifu, and much of Kansai. He placed first in Tokyo and won a majority in Kanagawa. Okada won 94% and all six points in his home prefecture of Mie and performed strongly in Chiba, Osaka, Chūgoku, Tōhoku, Shikoku, and Kyushu. Nagatsuma performed best in Tochigi, Hokkaido, and Ibaraki prefectures.

Overall, Hosono won 298 points (39.2%) to Okada's 294 (38.7%) and Nagatsuma's 168 (22.1%). A runoff was thus held to choose a winner. Okada emerged victorious by a narrow margin of 133 to 120, winning support from 66 Diet members compared to Hosono's 60. The Mainichi Shimbun reported that a majority of Nagatsuma's supporters backed Okada in the runoff.

=== First round ===
Candidate	Diet members			Party members & supporters			Local assembly members			Diet candidates			Total
Candidate	Votes	%	Points	Votes	%	Points	Votes	%	Points	Votes	%	Points	Total
Goshi Hosono	48	36.4	96	41,563	40.0	139	649	44.3	63	0	0.0	0	298
Katsuya Okada	47	35.6	94	41,079	39.5	148	532	36.3	51	1	100.0	1	294
Akira Nagatsuma	37	28.0	74	21,348	20.5	67	284	19.4	27	0	0.0	0	168
Total	132	100.0	264	103,990	100.0	354	1,465	100.0	141	1	100.0	1	760
Invalid	0			523			2			0			
Turnout	132	100.0		104,513	46.2		1,467	90.1		1	100.0		
Eligible	132			226,148			1,629			1			
Source: Democratic Party of Japan

=== Runoff ===
Candidate	Diet members			Diet candidates			Total
Candidate	Votes	%	Points	Votes	%	Points	Total
Katsuya Okada	66	52.4	132	1	100.0	1	133
Goshi Hosono	60	47.6	120	0	0.0	0	120
Total	126	100.0	252	1	100.0	1	253
Invalid	2			0			
Turnout	128	97.0		1	100.0		
Eligible	132			1			
Source: Democratic Party of Japan
