= 2016 Democratic Party (Japan, 2016) leadership election =

Political party election in Japan

2016 Democratic Party leadership election
- 15 September 2016
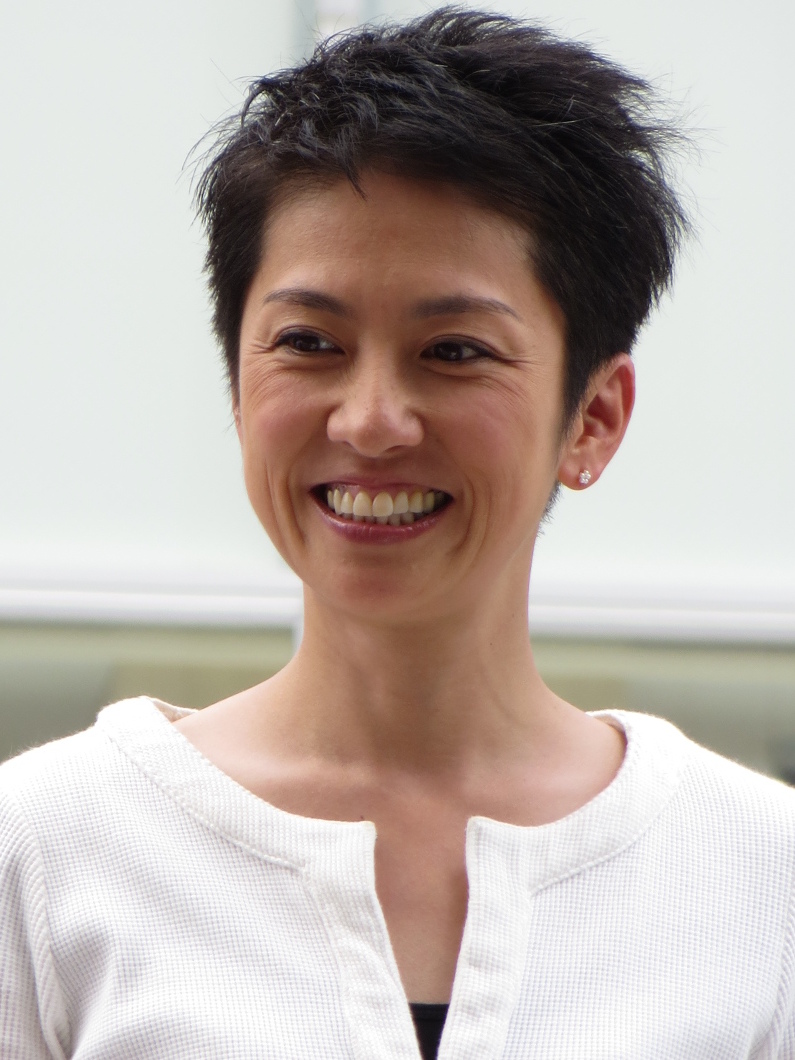

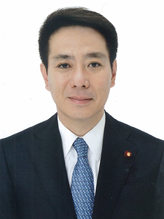

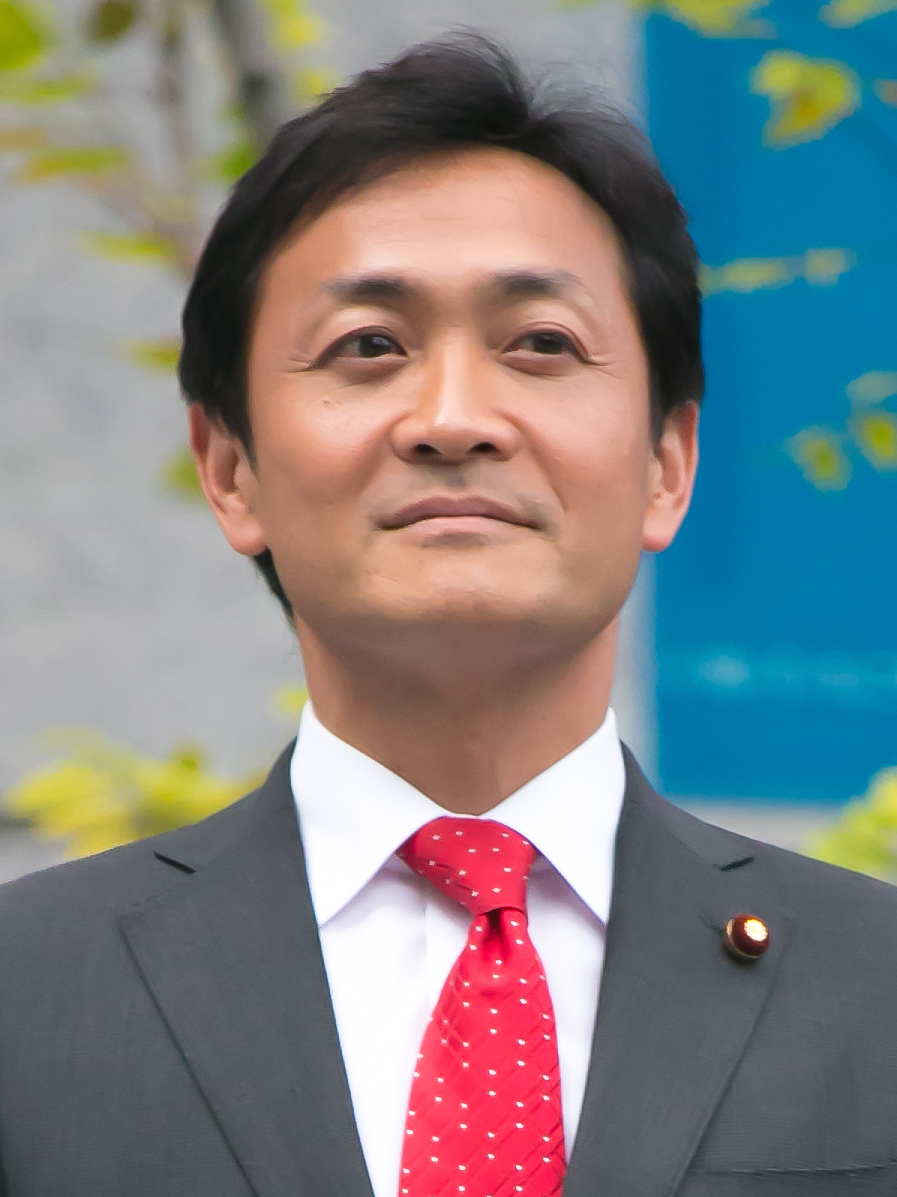
Candidate	Renhō	Seiji Maehara	Yuichiro Tamaki
Leader's seat	Tokyo at-large	Kyoto 2nd	Kagawa 2nd
Diet members	160	84	50
Party members	167	52	12
Local assembly	126	50	30
Candidates	50	44	24
Total points	503 (59.2%)	230 (27.1%)	116 (13.7%)
- Map of the results of the party member vote.
President before election
Katsuya Okada
Elected President
Renhō

The 2016 Democratic Party leadership election was held on 15 September 2016 in accordance with the end of the presidential term which had commenced in March. It was the first full presidential election since the formation of the party from the merger of the Democratic Party of Japan and the Japan Innovation Party earlier in the year. Incumbent president Katsuya Okada chose not to run for re-election.

Party vice president Renhō won in a landslide with 59% of the available points, defeating former president Seiji Maehara and newcomer Yuichiro Tamaki. She became the first female leader of the party and the second female opposition leader in Japan after Takako Doi, as well as the first mixed-race leader of a Japanese political party.

== Background ==
Katsuya Okada was elected president of the Democratic Party of Japan (DPJ) in January 2015 following the party's failure in the 2014 Japanese general election. Following the election, there was widespread discussion about a possible merger between the DPJ and Japan Innovation Party (JIP) in order to compete more effectively against the Liberal Democratic–Komeito government of Shinzo Abe. However, the JIP was controlled by an Osaka-based faction led by the city's conservative mayor Tōru Hashimoto, who favoured cooperation with the government. In May, following the failure of Hashimoto's key political project, the Osaka Metropolis plan, the party leadership resigned and the pro-opposition faction gained the upper hand with Yorihisa Matsuno as new leader. In late August, Hashimoto and many of his Osaka-based allies resigned from the JIP to form a new Osaka-based party. Following this, Matsuno actively pursued a DPJ–JIP merger, supported by most of the DPJ, particularly its right-wing. A merger was approved in February 2016 and took place on 27 March, forming the Minshintō (Democratic Progressive Party), officially the Democratic Party in English.

Okada was elected as party president during the merger, with his term set to expire in September. He led the Democratic Party into the July upper house elections. The party won 32 seats, a net loss of 19 from their pre-election numbers. Okada also failed in his stated goal of denying pro-constitutional reform parties a two-thirds majority in the chamber, despite forging an electoral alliance with the Communist, Social Democratic, and People's Life parties. He stated he would serve out the remaining two months of his term, but that he had not decided whether to seek re-election. On 30 July, he announced that he would not run for another term.

The contest was originally scheduled for 7 September, but the party executive announced on 28 July that it would be pushed back by a week for administrative reasons.

== Electoral system ==
Candidates were required to gather endorsements from twenty (maximum 25) of the party's members of the National Diet in order to stand.

The election was conducted via a points system:

- Each of the party's members of the National Diet had a vote worth two points. (294 points total)
- Registered party members or supporters could vote via mail. Points for this tier were distributed between the 47 prefectures, and awarded to candidates in proportion to votes won in each prefecture. (231 points total)
- Each of the party's members of local councils or prefectural assemblies could vote via mail. Points for this tier were awarded to candidates in proportion to votes won. (206 points total)
- Each of the party's approved candidates for future Diet elections had a vote worth one point. (118 points total)

In order to win, a candidate must secure more than 50% of points. If no candidate won more than 50%, a runoff was to be held the same day. In the runoff, only Diet members and approved candidates could vote. Nominations were taken on 2 September and the election held on the 15th.

== Candidates ==
Renhō was the first candidate to announce her bid on 5 August. At the time of the contest, she was vice president of the DP and one of its most high-profile female politicians, known for her wit and public speaking talent. In the House of Councillors election prior to the contest, she was re-elected in Tokyo with 1.12 million votes, the most of any candidate in the country. She was considered the frontrunner and believed to be favoured by the outgoing leadership; there was speculation that she might be unopposed. She offered generational change and a fresh image, pledging to demonstrate to voters that the party had robust policies and could do more than just criticise the government. She advocated cutting investment in public works, reforming the tax system, and investing in childcare and a national scholarship program. Emphasising her personality, she contrasted herself with outgoing president Okada, who she playfully described as "a very boring man". Her candidacy was observed to be part of an increasing trend of female leadership in Japanese politics, alongside Yuriko Koike's election as Governor of Tokyo; Renhō stated she wanted to inspire women to break the glass ceiling.

Seiji Maehara announced his candidacy on 26 August. He was a party veteran and previously served as president from 2005–06 and foreign minister during 2010–11. A leader of the party's right wing, he called for an end to the electoral pact with the Communist Party. He advocated free access to preschool and tertiary education, funded by increased taxes. Known as a longtime advocate of constitutional revision, Maehara softened his stance during the campaign, criticising Shinzo Abe's approach to the issue as divisive. In response to arguments that the party needed a new face, he stated that "freshness alone isn’t enough" and emphasised his experience with the failures of the DPJ's period in government from 2009 to 2012: "We need to take a moment to grovel and apologize to voters. That's a start."

Yuichiro Tamaki was a late entrant and began gathering sponsors from late August. On the eve of nominations, he said he was still "one or two short" of the 20 nominations required to stand, but was able to reach the threshold the following day. He was a third-term Diet member and his candidacy was supported by fellow junior legislators. He stated that "unless a person like me displays an all-out effort to revolutionize the party, the public will never understand how serious the DP is about changing itself."

Former lawmakers of the JIP, the largest single group within the Democratic Party, sought a united position in the contest. Former JIP president Kenji Eda considered running, but stated on 30 August that he would not due to lack of consensus within the group. Legislators were divided between Renhō, Maehara, and Tamaki. The following day, a group of eighteen ex-JIP members jointly endorsed both Renhō and Maehara.

Goshi Hosono, who was narrowly defeated by Okada in the 2015 presidential contest, was considered a possible candidate. After discussions with Renhō, he announced on 9 August that he would not run and endorsed her.

Akira Nagatsuma aimed to run again, but ruled himself out on the 19th after failing to secure backing from the Akamatsu faction. Akihisa Nagashima announced his withdrawal from the contest on 30 August due to lack of support. Kazuhiro Haraguchi, who founded his own study group after the House of Councillors elections, aimed to run. He and Tamaki attempted to negotiate to unify their candidacies, but were unsuccessful; Haraguchi failed to gather the necessary sponsors.

Candidate	Offices held
Renhō Murata (age 48); Tokyo	Member of the House of Councillors (2004–); Minister of State for Government Revitalization (2010–12)
Seiji Maehara (age 54); Kyoto Prefecture	Member of the House of Representatives (1993–); President of the Democratic Party of Japan (2005–06); Minister for Foreign Affairs (2010–11)
Yuichiro Tamaki (age 47); Kagawa Prefecture	Member of the House of Representatives (2009–)

=== Sponsors ===
Renhō (25)	Seiji Maehara (24)	Yuichiro Tamaki (20)
House of Representatives: Hirotaka Akamatsu; Goshi Hosono; Yosei Ide; Mito Kakizawa; Toru Kikawada; Yōsuke Kondō; Shoichi Kondo; Kazuko Kōri; Takayuki Ochiai; Rintaro Ogata; Hiroshi Ogushi; Takahiro Sasaki; Go Shinohara; Yoshiaki Takaki; Koichi Takemasa; Keisuke Tsumura; House of Councillors: Kumiko Aihara; Sachiko Hirayama; Ryūhei Kawada; Takanori Kawai; Masao Kobayashi; Masayoshi Nataniya; Kazuya Shimba; Hideya Sugio; Masayo Tanabu	House of Representatives: Motohisa Furukawa; Takashi Ishizeki; Kenta Izumi; Yosuke Kamiyama; Keiro Kitagami; Yasuko Komiyama; Yoshio Maki; Kenko Matsuki; Akihisa Nagashima; Katsuhito Nakajima; Junya Ogawa; Akihiro Ohata; Mitsunori Okamoto; Atsushi Oshima; Kazumi Ota; Yunosuke Sakamoto; Takashi Shinohara; Katsumasa Suzuki; Kaname Tajima; Shu Watanabe; House of Councillors: Tetsuro Fukuyama; Teruhiko Mashiko; Motohiro Ōno; Mitsuru Sakurai	House of Representatives: Tomoko Abe; Satoshi Arai; Nobuyuki Fukushima; Akihiro Hatsushika; Masato Imai; Naoto Kan; Shūhei Kishimoto; Takane Kiuchi; Naohisa Matsuda; Masashi Mito; Takeshi Miyazaki; Kensuke Onishi; Takashi Takai; Manabu Terata; Hiroyuki Yokoyama; House of Councillors: Kenzo Fujisue; Shinkun Haku; Michihiro Ishibashi; Shinji Morimoto; Minoru Yanagida

=== Failed to qualify ===
- Kazuhiro Haraguchi, member of the House of Representatives (1996–) and Minister for Internal Affairs and Communications (2009–10)

=== Withdrew ===
- Akira Nagatsuma, member of the House of Representatives (2000–) and Minister of Health, Labour and Welfare (2009–10)
- Akihisa Nagashima, member of the House of Representatives (2003–) – (endorsed Maehara)
- Yosei Ide, member of the House of Representatives (2012–) – (endorsed Renhō)

=== Declined ===
- Katsuya Okada, former Minister for Foreign Affairs (2008–09) and incumbent President of the Democratic Party (2015–) – (endorsed Renhō)
- Goshi Hosono, Minister of the Environment (2011–12) and runner-up in the 2015 presidential election – (endorsed Renhō)
- Kenji Eda, member of the House of Representatives (2002–03, 2005–) and president of the Japan Innovation Party (2014–15)

== Contest ==
Renhō was the frontrunner and received widespread factional support. This included "mainstream" representatives in the outgoing executive, including outgoing president Okada. The Noda faction, Goshi Hosono's faction, the former JSP faction around Hirotaka Akamatsu, and Yoshiaki Takaki's faction of former DSP members all backed her, as did several former JIP members.

Maehara faced difficulty reaching 20 nominations due to overlapping membership inside his own faction, strong desire for new leadership within the party, and lack of unified support from the party right. He only chose to run after receiving encouragement from Michihiko Kano and securing support from Kano's former faction, now led by Akihiro Ohata. Maehara also attempted unsuccessfully to win over Akamatsu. These approaches to left-leaning factions were viewed as a pivot to the centre to counter widespread support for Renhō throughout the party. After Akihisa Nagashima dropped out of the contest, his faction supported Maehara. He also reached out to former JIP members who were opposed to an uncontested race.

Tamaki was supported by former JIP members such as Masato Imai, as well as the Kan faction and parts of the Ohata faction.

A Sankei Shimbun-FNN poll of possible candidates on 8 August, when only Renhō had announced her bid, found she was well ahead of all others with 32% support. Maehara garnered 7.5% support, Goshi Hosono 6.9%, Yukio Edano 6.8%, outgoing president Okada 4.3%, Akira Nagatsuma 3.3%, and Tamaki 1.4%. A 3–4 September Mainichi Shimbun poll showed Renhō at 32%, Maehara on 19%, and Tamaki on 4% among the general public. Among DP supporters, she had an overwhelming lead of 61% to Maehara's 20% and Tamaki's 7%.

A Sankei survey on 8 September indicated that Renhō was well ahead of the other candidates and likely to win without the need for a runoff. They reported that her support totaled 65 out the party's 147 Diet members and a majority of its local assembly members. They attributed 40 supporters to Maehara, 20 to Tamaki, and 20 still undecided.

The issue of Renhō's nationality and citizenship emerged during the campaign. She was born to a Taiwanese father and Japanese mother, and was a Taiwanese citizen at birth, in accordance with Japanese citizenship law at the time which preferred children adopt the father's nationality. After a change in the law in 1985, she acquired Japanese citizenship at age 17. She previously claimed that she had renounced Taiwanese citizenship at the same time, but admitted on 13 September that she had not. Japanese law prohibits dual citizenship above the age of 22, though nobody has ever been deprived of citizenship for this reason. Renhō stated that her father had filed the paperwork for her and that she was unaware he had done so incorrectly. She pledged to renew her efforts to renounce her Taiwanese citizenship.

== Results ==
Renhō won 503 points of 849 available, therefore winning outright without the need for a runoff. She was supported by 80 of the party's 147 Diet members (54%) and a clear majority of grassroots members (62%) and local assembly members (61%). Her support was less pronounced among the 118 approved Diet candidates, where she won 50 votes to Maehara's 44.

Among the party membership, Renhō swept almost every prefecture, performing best in the Tōhoku and Chūgoku regions. Maehara and Tamaki both swept their home prefectures, Kyoto and Kagawa respectively. Tamaki also won Wakayama Prefecture, while Maehara narrowly beat Renhō in Gifu, Kumamoto, and Tottori. Overall, Renhō won 167 points, Maehara 52, and Tamaki 12.

Candidate	Diet members			Party members & supporters			Local assembly members			Diet candidates			Total
Candidate	Votes	%	Points	Votes	%	Points	Votes	%	Points	Votes	%	Points	Total
Renhō	80	54.4	160	59,539	62.4	167	847	61.0	126	50	42.4	50	503
Seiji Maehara	42	28.6	84	26,045	27.3	52	335	24.1	50	44	37.3	44	230
Yuichiro Tamaki	25	17.0	50	9,808	10.3	12	207	14.9	30	24	20.3	24	116
Total	147	100.0	294	95,392	100.0	231	1,389	100.0	206	118	100.0	118	849
Invalid	0			789			4			0			
Turnout	147	100.0		96,181	40.9		1,393	87.8		118	100.0		
Eligible	147			235,211			1,586			118			
Source: Democratic Party
