= Jun Azumi =

Japanese politician (born 1962)

- 安住 淳
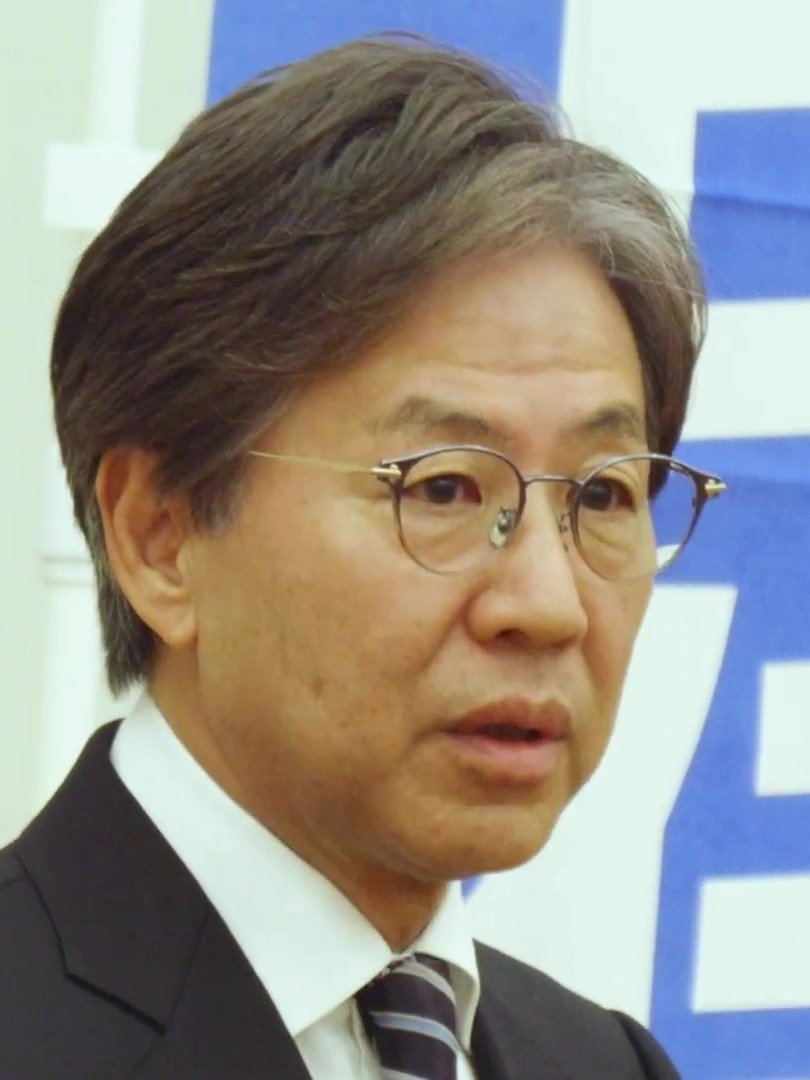
- Azumi in 2025

Secretary-General of Centrist Reform Alliance
- In office 22 January 2026 – 18 February 2026 Serving with Hiromasa Nakano
- Leader: Yoshihiko Noda; Tetsuo Saito
- Preceded by: Office established
- Succeeded by: Takeshi Shina

Secretary-General of Constitutional Democratic Party
- In office 11 September 2025 – 19 January 2026
- Leader: Yoshihiko Noda
- Preceded by: Junya Ogawa
- Succeeded by: Masayo Tanabu

Minister of Finance
- In office 2 September 2011 – 1 October 2012
- Prime Minister: Yoshihiko Noda
- Preceded by: Yoshihiko Noda
- Succeeded by: Koriki Jojima

Member of the House of Representatives
- In office 21 October 1996 – 23 January 2026
- Preceded by: Constituency established
- Succeeded by: Chisato Morishita
- Constituency: Miyagi 5th (1996–2024); Miyagi 4th (2024–2026)

Personal details
- Born: 17 January 1962 (age 64) Oshika, Miyagi, Japan
- Party: CDP (since 2019)
- Other political affiliations: NPS (1993–1996); DP 1996 (1996–1998); DPJ (1998–2016); DP 2016 (2016–2018); Independent (2018–2019)
- Children: Two
- Education: Waseda University
- Website: Official website

Jun Azumi (安住 淳, Azumi Jun; born 17 January 1962) is a Japanese politician of the Constitutional Democratic Party (CDP), a member of the House of Representatives in the Diet (national legislature). He is also the current secretary-general of the CDP on 11 September 2025.

== Early life ==
Azumi was born in Oshika town (now Ishinomaki), Oshika within Miyagi Prefecture. His dad, Shigehiko Azumi, was formerly mayor of Oshika town.

After graduating from Ishinomaki High School, Azumi took a short break before entering Waseda University. While at Waseda, he was a member of the oratorical club and Yaichi Ohata's seminar, which focused on international trade. After graduation, Azumi took a job at NHK as a reporter. He was assigned to the Akita branch, and tasked with covering police affairs along with violent and non-violent crime. He later became a reporter for the Tokyo News Bureau's political department, and focused on covering the Liberal Democratic Party. He later became a reporter covering Deputy Chief Cabinet Secretary Hiroyuki Sonoda. His boss at the time was Hideo Kageyama, who eventually encouraged Azumi to enter politics, stating "you'll enter a tough world." He retired from reporting fully in 1993.

== Entering politics ==
Azumi first ran in the 1993 general election in the former Miyagi's 2nd district, and was recommended by both the Japan New Party and New Party Sakigake. He placed fifth out of a field with three winners, however, and lost. He eventually joined the NPS after his loss, and flowed with the other members of the NPS into forming the 1996 Democratic Party.

In the 1996 general election, he ran for Miyagi's 5th district under the new electoral reform, which had become a duel between him and NFP candidate Kimio Doi, who had placed fourth in Miyagi's 2nd district in 1993. Ichiro Hino, a SDP representative who had won a seat in Miyagi's 2nd in 1993 and was Minister of Posts and Telecommunications in the First Hashimoto Cabinet, had switched to the proportional block solely rather than run in the district. Azumi narrowly won against Doi and several other candidates, including LDP, SDP, and JCP members.

Azumi held the seat in 2000 against Doi, who had joined the LDP, by an incredibly narrow margin of just over 1,000 votes. Hino was scheduled to run in the district, but was pulled out of the district before the election to only run in the proportional block again. He became a member of the Foreign Affairs Committee in 2000. He held his seat by a wider margin in 2003, and in 2005, he was the only DPJ member to defend his seat in Miyagi, winning by a similar margin as he did in 2003 despite the nationwide LDP landslide. Party president Katsuya Okada resigned the day after the election, and in the ensuing 2005 Democratic Party of Japan leadership election, he was named a recommender for Seiji Maehara. Maehara defeated Noda by two votes, and he briefly became the Chair of the DPJ Election Committee.

In the 2008 Osaka gubernatorial election, Azumi actively supported Sadatoshi Kumagi along with members of the "Gasoline Price Reduction Squadron", a grouping of DPJ representatives who supported the abolition of the provisional gasoline tax. Kumagi was defeated by Toru Hashimoto.

== In government ==
=== Hatoyama Cabinet ===
In the 2009 election which saw a change in government, the DPJ won five out of six seats in Miyagi. Azumi won himself by an increased margin of over 15%. He thereafter became Chair of the Security Committee of the House of Representatives.

=== Kan Cabinet ===
As Hatoyama was succeeded by Naoto Kan following the June 2010 leadership election, Azumi was tapped to lead the Election Committee again by Kan, and was tasked with the 2010 House of Councillors election along with party Secretary-General Yukio Edano. However, the DPJ suffered a defeat in the elections compared to 2007. Voices from inside the party demanded the resignations of both Edano and Azumi as a result, but Kan agreed to allow both to stay until he was re-elected in the September 2010 leadership election. In the leadership election, he expressed his support for Kan over Ichirō Ozawa, and was appointed as Deputy Minister of Defense under Toshimi Kitazawa in the reshuffled Kan cabinet. When the second reshuffled Kan cabinet was inaugurated in January 2011, Azumi became Chairman of the DPJ National Diet Committee. He said he would likely aim to submit a Human Rights Protection law.

His family house was affected in the 2011 Tōhoku earthquake and tsunami. When asked about the shortage of supplies, Shu Watanabe, who was placed as Deputy Leader of the DPJ Earthquake Response Committee, said that even if gasoline was transported to affected areas, there was no place to store it. Azumi shortly after said he had considered storing gasoline in school swimming pools. Later, however, Azumi denied he ever said this.

When criticism grew around Naoto Kan's response to the earthquake and tsunami, Azumi retorted that "no matter who is Prime Minister, it will be an enormously difficult problem, and it is outrageous to say that Kan is entirely to blame." Regarding the issue of illegal donations made by Zainichi Koreans to Prime Minister Kan, he stated "I was not aware that the donations were made in Japanese names. I think it was careless, but it was not intentional, so I'm not worried. I think the Cabinet should continue to provide detailed explanations as to the situation." This was seen as discouraging growing calls from within the DPJ which were calling for Kan to resign.

In June 2011 when the LDP and Komeito submitted a no confidence motion against Kan, particularly due to his response following the 2011 earthquake. In response to DPJ lawmakers who were threatening to join the LDP in voting to bring down the Kan cabinet and had grown distrustful of DPJ leadership, Azumi stated "In order to fulfill our responsibility as the ruling party, we must reject the motion by a large margin. Anyone who votes in favor will be expelled, no matter who they are or how many there are." He eventually informed Ichiro Aisawa, chair of the LDP's Diet Committee, of Naoto Kan's intention to resign in Early July to hold a leadership election within the DPJ again. He asked for Aisawa's understanding in the early passage of the special bill for the issuance of government bonds.

=== Noda Cabinet ===
Azumi's inauguration as Finance Minister

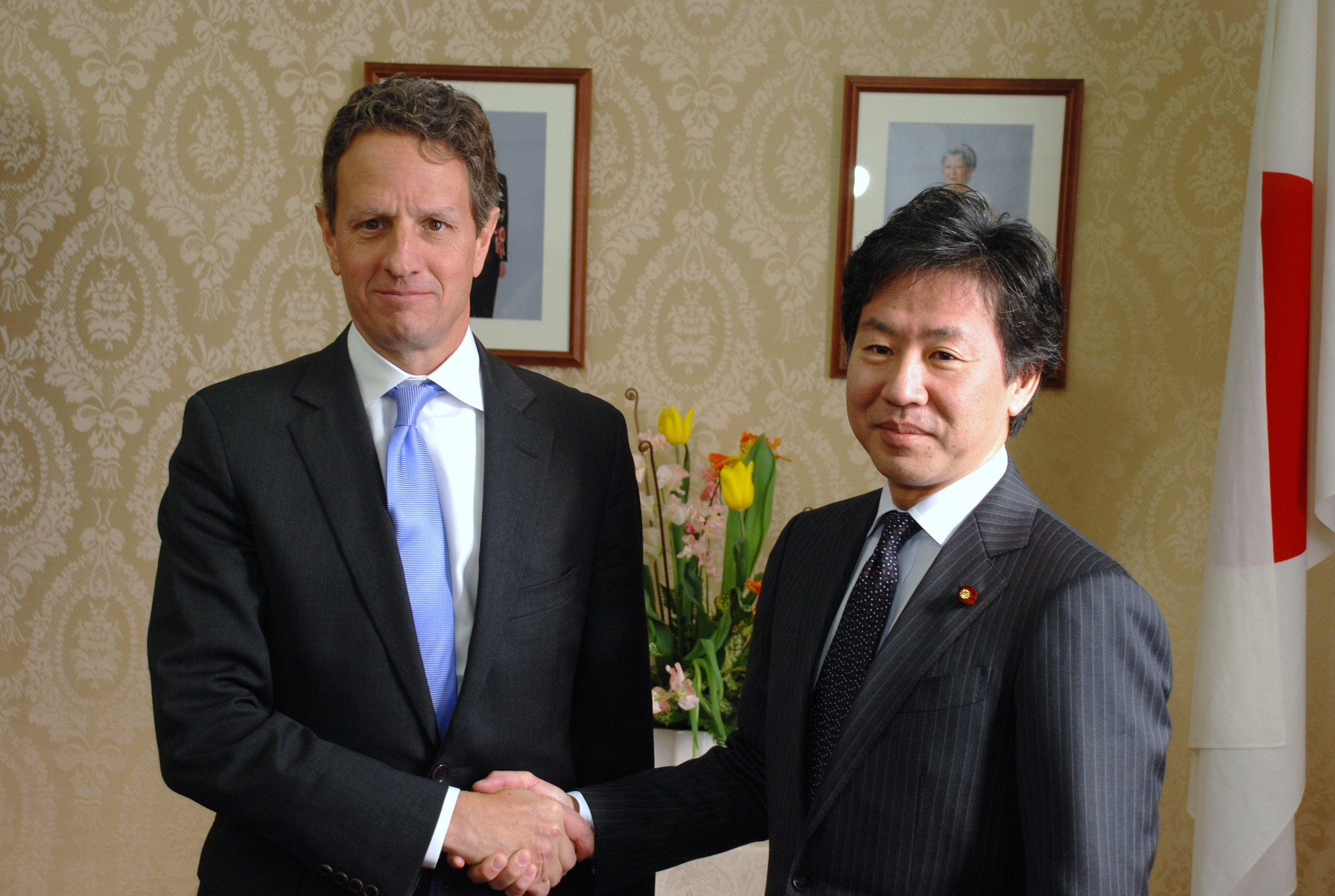
At the Ministry of Finance with Tim Geithner

In September 2011, he joined the Noda Cabinet as Minister of Finance. This was taken as something as a surprise by most people and himself, as he was not previously associated with fiscal posts. Azumi was much more experienced in Defense posts, such as holding the chairman spot of the Security Committee within the House of Representatives and having held the Vice Minister of Defense role, and was said to have studied up on classified intel in preparation for being tapped as Minister of Defense. Noda had approached various people for the Finance role, including past party leader Katsuya Okada and Education Minister Tatsuo Kawabata along with others, but they had declined. Eventually, a senior figure within the Minister of Finance recommended Azumi, owing to his highly rated negotiation skills as Chair of the DPJ's Diet Committee.

It is also cited that Noda, whose biggest issue was raising the consumption tax, highly valued Azumi's abilities and hoped they would be an asset in working with the opposition. Even including his time as Minister of Finance, it is relatively unusual for someone to become Minister of Finance when first joining the cabinet (his predecessor, Yoshihiko Noda, became Minister of Finance after being promoted from the Vice Minister of Finance). He was just the third person to be appointed Finance Minister in his 40s, along with former Prime Ministers Hayato Ikeda and Kakuei Tanaka. He was re-appointed as Finance Minister following both Noda cabinet reshuffles, and when Tadahiro Matsushita died in September 2011, who was serving as Minister of State for Financial Services, he took on the role.

=== Acting Secretary-General ===
On September 28, Azumi was appointed to the role of Acting Secretary-General of the DPJ, resigning as Minister of Finance and Minister of State for Financial Services. He was replaced as Minister of Finance by Kōriki Jōjima, and Minister of State for Financial Services by Ikko Nakatsuka.

When the House of Representatives was dissolved on November 16, he took over as Secretary-General from Azuma Koshiishi, a member of the House of Councillors, and de facto became head of the electoral strategy for the upcoming elections. As one of the faces of the DPJ, he expressed his enthusiasm by saying he will "be on all the TV shows".

In the 2012 election, the DPJ was swept out of office, and many top officials and party veterans lost; less than 20% of the party remained in the House of Representatives. Azumi, however, won safely, becoming the only opposition representative in Miyagi. Despite his margin of victory actually increasing, the huge slate of LDP members winning in SMDs meant that Miyo Okubo, the LDP member who had run against him, had won representation off of the proportional block, the first time this had happened in Miyagi's 5th.

== 2012-2019 ==
=== DPJ (2012-2016) ===
After the 2012 election, he left the post of acting Secretary-General. He was appointed to become the head of Miyagi's Democratic Party of Japan Federation, and was in charge of assisting incumbent Councillor Tomiko Okazaki in defending her seat during the 2013 Japanese House of Councillors election. Ultimately, however, the strong headwinds against the DPJ led to Okazaki coming third in the prefecture, behind the victorious LDP candidate Jiro Aichi and Your Party candidate Masamune Wada. Okazaki had held the seat since 1997.

In September 2013 when DPJ President Banri Kaieda shuffled leadership, Azumi was appointed as the head of the Democratic Party's Great East Japan Earthquake Recovery and Reconstruction Promotion Headquarters.

At the 185th Diet session convened on October 15, 2013, he was appointed as the Special Committee Chairman on Okinawa and Northern Territories Issues. In 2014, he was appointed as the Deputy Chair of the Democratic Party's Diet Affairs Committee.

During the 2014 election, Miyo Okubo, who he had defeated but was revived in 2012, was unable to gain the LDP endorsement to run in Miyagi's 5th again. Instead. Shigeaki Katsunuma, who had previously been placed solely on the Hokkaido PR block, was selected to run in the district against Azumi. The DPJ suffered a heavy loss again with only minor gains, but Azumi was elected by a margin over 25% again. However, for similar reasons that Okubo was revived for in 2012, the extremely small number of districts the DPJ won in Tohoku meant that even with the wide margin of Azumi's victory Katsunuma was revived and given a seat on the Tohoku PR block.

In the 2015 DPJ election, he was listed as a recommender for Katsuya Okada. He remained Deputy Chair of the DPJ Diet Affairs Committee after Okada won.

=== DP (2016-17) ===
He participated in the formation of the 2016 Democratic Party (Minshintō, vs Minshutō), which was formed as a result of the merger of JIP and DPJ, and was tapped to become head of the Diet Affair's Committee for the new party. In the 2016 leadership election, he supported then acting leader Renhō. After her election, he expressed strong interest in becoming Secretary-General, but was instead tapped as deputy chair of the party.

At the end of 2017, Yoshihiko Noda resigned as Secretary-General following the defeat of the party in the 2017 Tokyo prefectural elections. Renhō eventually resigned as a result of being unable to find a new Secretary-General, after which Azumi apologized for being unable to fully support Renhō.

In September 2017, shortly after Seiji Maehara was elected President of the DP, Shinzo Abe dissolved the House of Representatives for a snap election. Maehara proposed merging the DP candidates into the new Kibō no Tō party led by Tokyo Governor Yuriko Koike, which was agreed upon by the party on September 28. However, on September 29, Yuriko Koike said she would exclude candidates who opposed security legislation proposed by the Third Abe Cabinet. Koike said that candidates would be forced to accept the security legislation, or else face exclusion from party lists.

On the same day, Azumi gathered prospective candidates from Miyagi to discuss how to proceed. He considered applying for candidacy under Kibō no Tō, but the next day on September 30, the "exclusion list" of 15 DP members created by Koike was leaked. Azumi's name was present on the list. (Note: The exclusion list included: Jun Azumi (Miyagi-5); Yukio Edano (Saitama-5); Yoshihiko Noda (Chiba-4); Akira Nagatsuma (Tokyo-7); Akihiro Hatsushika (Tokyo-16); Naoto Kan (Tokyo-18); Tomoko Abe (Kanagawa-12); Takashi Shinohara (Nagano-1); Shoichi Kondo (Aichi-3); Hirotaka Akamatsu (Aichi-5); Katsuya Okada (Mie-3); Kiyomi Tsujimoto (Osaka-10); Other names considered included: Banri Kaieda (Tokyo-1); Yoshio Tezuka (Tokyo-5); Mari Kushibuchi (Tokyo-23)) On October 1, he announced his intention to party executives to run as an independent instead of seeking the endorsement of KnT. He formally announced on October 2 he would seek re-election as an independent.

He would go on to win by over a 25% margin, meaning that Shigeaki Katsunuma was unable to be revived on the proportional block due to the size of victory.

=== Group of Independents (2017-19) ===
He became a founding member of the Group of Independents on October 26, 2017, comprising ex-DP members who were unwilling or unable to join Kibō no Tō and had not joined the CDP.

He submitted a notice to the DP on May 1, 2018, that he would not be interested in joining a new merged version of the KnT and DP, which would later manifest as the Democratic Party For the People. He declared a formal resignation from the Democratic Party in the same letter.

== CDP (2019-) ==
On January 15, 2019, he formally joined the Constitutional Democratic Party, along with several other members of the Group of Independents such as Katsuya Okada.

He stayed with the CDP when it merged with groupings of DPP and SDP lawmakers on September 19, being named Diet Affairs Chairman of the CDP on September 20.

In the 2021 election, he held onto his district against newcomer Chisato Morishita by 13%, with Morishita being shut-out from being revived on the proportional block. With the inauguration of Kenta Izumi as leader of the CDP, he resigned as Diet Affairs Chair, being succeeded by Sumio Mabuchi.

A personnel reshuffle in August 2022 saw him become Diet Affairs Chair of the party again. November 2022 saw the passing of the revised Public Offices Election Bill, which redistributed and redrew electoral districts. Miyagi saw a House of Representatives seat it held cut due to population loss, reducing the prefecture from 6 to 5 seats. The CDP held a meeting in December following the law's passage and formally endorsed 69 candidates in the new districts, with Azumi moving from Miyagi's 5th to Miyagi's 4th. The 4th comprises much of the same territory as the 5th did, but also holds onto several districts and cities from the former 4th such as Kurokawa, Tomiya, and Tagajō.

In the 2024 election, Azumi ran in the 4th district. The incumbent, former Environmental Minister Shintaro Ito, stayed in the district rather than move to a different one. An Ishin candidate and a Reiwa Shinsengumi candidate also ran. The LDP campaign was described as a struggle, particularly due to the slush fund and Unification Church scandals. Just after voting closed at 8:00 PM, the Asahi Shimbun announced it was sure Azumi had won the district. The LDP won five seats on the Tohoku PR block; however, the margin of defeat for the last seat on the PR block was 75.14% with Taku Nemoto, which was higher than Ito's (64.19%). Ito lost his seat entirely as a result.

He became chair of the Budget Committee on November 14, the first from the opposition in over 30 years. He made his debut on December 5.

Following the resignation of Junya Ogawa, Azumi was named Secretary-General of the Constitutional Democratic Party of Japan.

== Personal life ==
Azumi is married and has two children.

== Notes ==
House of Representatives (Japan)
New district	Member of the House of Representatives for Miyagi 5th district (single-member); 1996–present	Incumbent
Preceded by Hiroshi Imazu	Chairman of the Committee on Security; 2009–2010	Succeeded by Ken Okuda
Preceded by Kazunori Yamanoi	Chairman of the Committee on Discipline; 2021–2022	Succeeded by Hiroshi Ogushi
Preceded by Tatsuya Ito	Chairman of the Committee on the Budget; 2024–2025	Succeeded by Yukio Edano
Political offices
Preceded by Kazuya Shinba	Senior Vice Minister of Defence; 2010–2011	Succeeded by Katsuya Ogawa
Preceded by Yoshihiko Noda	Minister of Finance; 2011–2012	Succeeded by Koriki Jojima
Party political offices
Preceded by Yoshio Hachiro	Chairman of the Diet Affairs Committee, Democratic Party; 2011	Succeeded by Hirofumi Hirano
New political party	Chairman of the Diet Affairs Committee, Democratic Party; 2016	Succeeded by Kazunori Yamanoi
Preceded by Kiyomi Tsujimoto	Chairman of the Diet Affairs Committee, Constitutional Democratic Party; 2019–2021	Succeeded by Sumio Mabuchi
Preceded by Sumio Mabuchi	Chairman of the Diet Affairs Committee, Constitutional Democratic Party; 2022–2024	Succeeded by Hirofumi Ryu
Preceded by Junya Ogawa	Secretary General of the Constitutional Democratic Party; 2025–2026	Succeeded by Masayo Tanabu
New political party	Secretary General of the Centrist Reform Alliance; 2026–present Served alongside: Hiromasa Nakano	Incumbent
