= Noda cabinet =

Cabinet of Japan (2011–2012)

Noda Cabinet
- 95th Cabinet of Japan
- 2 September 2011 – 26 December 2012
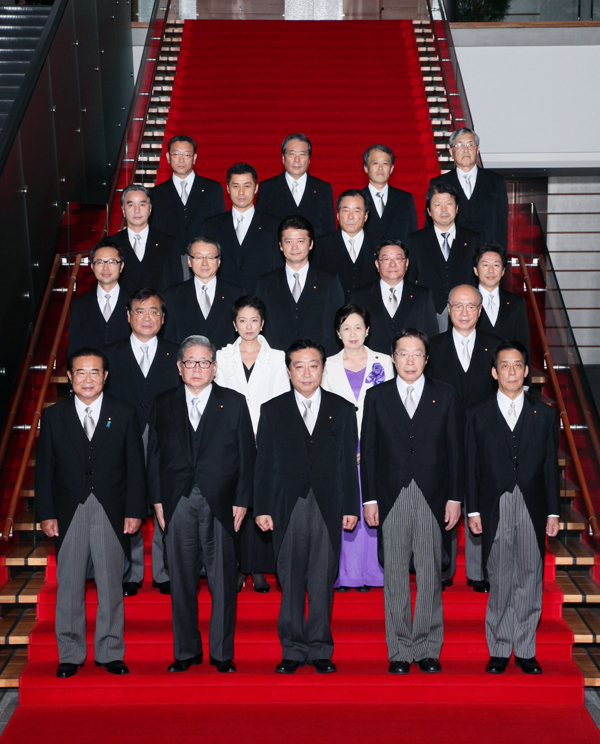
- Prime Minister Yoshihiko Noda (front row, centre) with the newly-elected cabinet inside the Kantei, September 2, 2011
- Date formed: September 2, 2011
- Date dissolved: December 26, 2012

People and organisations
- Emperor: Akihito
- Prime Minister: Yoshihiko Noda
- Deputy Prime Minister: Katsuya Okada (from January 13, 2012)
- Member party: Democratic Party of Japan; People's New Party
- Status in legislature: Coalition government HoR (Lower): Supermajority coalition HoC (Upper): Minority coalition
- Opposition party: Liberal Democratic Party; Komeito; Japanese Communist Party; Your Party; Social Democratic Party
- Opposition leader: Sadakazu Tanigaki (until September 26, 2012); Shinzo Abe (from September 26, 2012)

History
- Legislature terms: HoR: 2009–2012; HoC: 2007–2013 and 2010–2016
- Predecessor: Kan
- Successor: Abe II

The Noda Cabinet governed Japan from September 2011 to December 2012 under premiership of Yoshihiko Noda, who came into power after winning the DPJ leadership in September 2011. The Cabinet enacted economic reforms to reduce the burden of Japan's debt and the costs inflicted by the 2011 Tōhoku earthquake and tsunami and the subsequent Fukushima nuclear accident.

== Political background ==
The previous Prime Minister and DPJ president, Naoto Kan resigned on 26 August 2011 after the passage of the second extra budget for 2011. Kan's resignation triggered a DPJ leadership election, which was won by Finance Minister Yoshihiko Noda. On 2 September, Noda was formally appointed by the Emperor as the Japan's 95th Prime Minister and the third DPJ Prime Minister in two years.

The administration oversaw the first increase of consumption tax since 1997. Noda seek to increase the tax to gain more revenue to pay off Japan's debt and the cost of the recovery of the triple disaster. Long considered to be an unpopular policy, successive governments failed to enact the increase. The consumption tax increase also caused a split within the DPJ. While the consumption tax increase bill received wide support in the Diet, including from the LDP opposition, a major faction in the DPJ led by Ichirō Ozawa was strongly opposed to the policy. Ozawa and his faction decided to split from the DPJ on 11 July 2012, forming People's Life First which made the DPJ lose its majority in the Diet. With LDP support, Noda decided to hold a snap election. The DPJ lost most of its seats while the LDP returned into power after three years of opposition.

Following Fukushima radiation, Noda's government also oversaw further closedown of Japan's nuclear power plants, continuing his predecessor's policy. An exception to this was the Ōi Nuclear Power Plant in Fukui which was reopened in July 2012 to mitigate the damage inflicted to the plant-dependent local economy. The reopening was proven to be brief with both of the restarted reactors shut down again in September 2013.

== Election of the prime minister ==
30 August 2011
House of Representatives Absolute majority (239/476) required
Choice	Vote	
Choice	Caucuses	Votes
Yoshihiko Noda	DPJ (303), PNP (3), NPN (1), Independent [Speaker] (1)	308 / 476
Sadakazu Tanigaki	LDP (116), Independent (1), Independent [Vice Speaker] (1)	118 / 476
Natsuo Yamaguchi	Kōmeitō (21)	21 / 476
Kazuo Shii	JCP (9)	9 / 476
Mizuho Fukushima	Social Democratic Party of Japan (6)	6 / 476
Yoshimi Watanabe	Your Party (5)	5 / 476
Takeo Hiranuma	Sunrise Party (2), Hiranuma Group independents (2)	4 / 476
Ichirō Ozawa	Independent (1)	1 / 476
Banri Kaieda	Independent (1)	1 / 476
Kunio Hatoyama	Independent (1)	1 / 476
Katsuhito Yokokume	Independent (1)	1 / 476
Abstention	Genzei Nippon (1)	1 / 480
Did not vote	Independent (2), LDP (1)	3 / 480
Vacant		1 / 480
Source: 177th Diet Session (House of Representatives) (roll call only lists individual votes, not grouped by caucus)

30 August 2011
House of Councillors
Choice	Vote	
Choice	Caucuses	Votes
First round Absolute majority (121/241) required
Yoshihiko Noda	DPJーShin-Ryokufūkai (106), PNP (3), Independent (1)	110 / 241
Sadakazu Tanigaki	LDP (82), Independent [Yasuhiro Ōe and Tamon Hasegawa] (2), Independent [Vice President] (1)	85 / 241
Natsuo Yamaguchi	Kōmeitō (19)	19 / 241
Yoshimi Watanabe	Your Party (11)	11 / 241
Kazuo Shii	JCP (6)	6 / 241
Mizuho Fukushima	Social Democratic Party of Japan (4), Independent (1)	5 / 241
Takeo Hiranuma	Sunrise PartyーNRP (3)	3 / 241
Yōichi Masuzoe	Sunrise PartyーNRP (2)	2 / 241
Did not vote	Independent [President] (1)	1 / 242
Second round (runoff) Simple majority required
Yoshihiko Noda	DPJーShin-Ryokufūkai (106), PNP (3), Independent (1)	110 / 241
Sadakazu Tanigaki	LDP (82), Kōmeitō (19), Sunrise PartyーNRP (3), Independent [Yasuhiro Ōe and Tamon Hasegawa] (2), Independent [Vice President] (1)	107 / 241
Blank votes	Your Party (11), JCP (6), Social Democratic Party of Japan (4), Sunrise PartyーNRP (2), Independent (1)	24 / 241
Did not vote	Independent [President] (1)	1 / 242
Source: 177th Diet Session (House of Councillors) - First round vote 177th Diet Session (House of Councillors) - Second round vote (lists individual votes grouped by caucus)

== Lists of ministers ==
Democratic
People's New
Independent
R = Member of the House of Representatives
C = Member of the House of Councillors
N = Non-Diet member
Italics denote acting minister

=== Cabinet ===
Noda Cabinet from September 2, 2011, to January 13, 2012
Portfolio	Minister		Term
Prime Minister	Yoshihiko Noda	R	September 2, 2011 – January 13, 2012
Minister for Internal Affairs and Communications; Minister of State for Okinawa and Northern Territories Affairs; Minister of State for Promotion of Local Sovereignty	Tatsuo Kawabata	R	September 2, 2011 – January 13, 2012
Minister of Justice	Hideo Hiraoka	R	September 2, 2011 – January 13, 2012
Minister of Foreign Affairs	Kōichirō Genba	R	September 2, 2011 – January 13, 2012
Minister of Finance	Jun Azumi	R	September 2, 2011 – January 13, 2012
Minister of Education, Culture, Sports, Science and Technology	Masaharu Nakagawa	R	September 2, 2011 – January 13, 2012
Minister of Health, Labour, and Welfare; Minister of State for Pension Reform	Yōko Komiyama	R	September 2, 2011 – January 13, 2012
Minister of Agriculture, Forestry and Fisheries	Michihiko Kano	R	September 2, 2011 – January 13, 2012
Minister of Economy, Trade and Industry	Yoshio Hachiro	R	September 2–11, 2011
Minister of Economy, Trade and Industry	Osamu Fujimura	R	September 11–12, 2011
Minister of Economy, Trade and Industry	Yukio Edano	R	September 12, 2011 – January 13, 2012
Minister of Land, Infrastructure, Transport and Tourism	Takeshi Maeda	C	September 2, 2011 – January 13, 2012
Minister of the Environment; Minister of State for the Nuclear Power Policy and Administration	Gōshi Hosono	R	September 2, 2011 – January 13, 2012
Minister of Defence	Yasuo Ichikawa	C	September 2, 2011 – January 13, 2012
Chief Cabinet Secretary	Osamu Fujimura	R	September 2, 2011 – January 13, 2012
Chairman of the National Public Safety Commission; Minister of State for Consumer Affairs and Food Safety	Kenji Yamaoka	R	September 2, 2011 – January 13, 2012
Minister of State for Disaster Management	Tatsuo Hirano	C	September 2, 2011 – January 13, 2012
Minister of State for Financial Services; Minister of State for Postal Reform	Shōzaburō Jimi	C	September 2, 2011 – January 13, 2012
Minister of State for Economic and Fiscal Policy; Minister of State for Science and Technology Policy	Motohisa Furukawa	R	September 2, 2011 – January 13, 2012
Minister of State for Government Revitalization; Minister of State for Measures for Declining Birthrate; Minister of State for Gender Equality; Minister of State for the New Public Commons	Renho	C	September 2, 2011 – January 13, 2012
Minister of State for the Corporation in Support of Compensation for Nuclear Damage	Gōshi Hosono	R	September 2 – October 3, 2011
Minister of State for the Corporation in Support of Compensation for Nuclear Damage	Yukio Edano	R	October 3, 2011 – January 13, 2012

=== First reshuffled cabinet ===
Noda Cabinet (First Reshuffle)
- 95th Cabinet of Japan
- January – June 2012
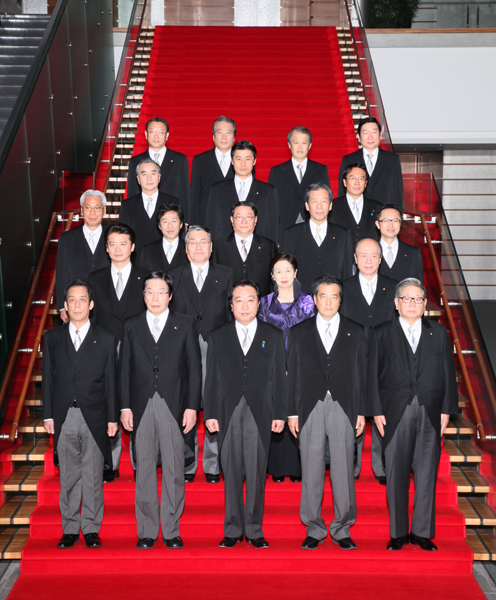
- Prime Minister Yoshihiko Noda (front row, centre) with his reshuffled cabinet inside the Kantei, January 13, 2012
- Date formed: January 13, 2012
- Date dissolved: June 4, 2012

People and organisations
- Emperor: Akihito
- Prime Minister: Yoshihiko Noda
- Deputy Prime Minister: Katsuya Okada (from January 13, 2012)
- Member party: Democratic Party of Japan; People's New Party
- Status in legislature: Coalition government HoR (Lower): Supermajority coalition HoC (Upper): Minority coalition
- Opposition party: Liberal Democratic Party; Komeito; Japanese Communist Party; Your Party; Social Democratic Party
- Opposition leader: Sadakazu Tanigaki (until September 26, 2012); Shinzo Abe (from September 26, 2012)

History
- Legislature terms: HoR: 2009–2012; HoC: 2007–2013 and 2010–2016
- Predecessor: Noda Cabinet
- Successor: Noda Cabinet (Second Reshuffle)

Noda Cabinet from January 13 to June 4, 2012
Portfolio	Minister		Term
Prime Minister	Yoshihiko Noda	R	January 13 – June 4, 2012
Deputy Prime Minister; Minister of State for Government Revitalization	Katsuya Okada	R	January 13 – June 4, 2012
Minister for Internal Affairs and Communications; Minister of State for Okinawa and Northern Territories Affairs; Minister of State for Promotion of Local Sovereignty	Tatsuo Kawabata	R	January 13 – June 4, 2012
Minister of Justice	Toshio Ogawa	C	January 13 – June 4, 2012
Minister of Foreign Affairs	Kōichirō Genba	R	January 13 – June 4, 2012
Minister of Finance	Jun Azumi	R	January 13 – June 4, 2012
Minister of Education, Culture, Sports, Science and Technology	Hirofumi Hirano	R	January 13 – June 4, 2012
Minister of Health, Labour, and Welfare; Minister of State for Pension Reform	Yōko Komiyama	R	January 13 – June 4, 2012
Minister of Agriculture, Forestry and Fisheries	Michihiko Kano	R	January 13 – June 4, 2012
Minister of Economy, Trade and Industry	Yukio Edano	R	January 13 – June 4, 2012
Minister of Land, Infrastructure, Transport and Tourism	Takeshi Maeda	C	January 13 – June 4, 2012
Minister of the Environment; Minister of State for the Nuclear Power Policy and Administration	Gōshi Hosono	R	January 13 – June 4, 2012
Minister of Defence	Naoki Tanaka	C	January 13 – June 4, 2012
Chief Cabinet Secretary	Osamu Fujimura	R	January 13 – June 4, 2012
Chairman of the National Public Safety Commission; Minister of State for Consumer Affairs and Food Safety	Jin Matsubara	R	January 13 – June 4, 2012
Minister of State for Disaster Management	Tatsuo Hirano	C	January 13 – February 10, 2012
Minister of State for Disaster Management	Masaharu Nakagawa	R	February 10 – June 4, 2012
Minister of State for Financial Services; Minister of State for Postal Reform	Shōzaburō Jimi	C	January 13 – June 4, 2012
Minister of State for Economic and Fiscal Policy; Minister of State for Science and Technology Policy	Motohisa Furukawa	R	January 13 – June 4, 2012
Minister of State for Gender Equality; Minister of State for the New Public Commons	Katsuya Okada	R	January 13 – February 10, 2012
Minister of State for Gender Equality; Minister of State for the New Public Commons	Masaharu Nakagawa	R	February 10 – June 4, 2012
Minister of State for Measures for Declining Birthrate	Katsuya Okada	R	January 13 – February 10, 2012
Minister of State for Measures for Declining Birthrate	Masaharu Nakagawa	R	February 10 – April 23, 2012
Minister of State for Measures for Declining Birthrate	Yōko Komiyama	R	April 23 – June 4, 2012
Minister of State for the Corporation in Support of Compensation for Nuclear Damage	Yukio Edano	R	January 13 – June 4, 2012
Minister for Reconstruction	Tatsuo Hirano	C	January 13 – June 4, 2012

=== Second reshuffled cabinet ===
Noda Cabinet (Second Reshuffle)
- 95th Cabinet of Japan
- June – October 2012
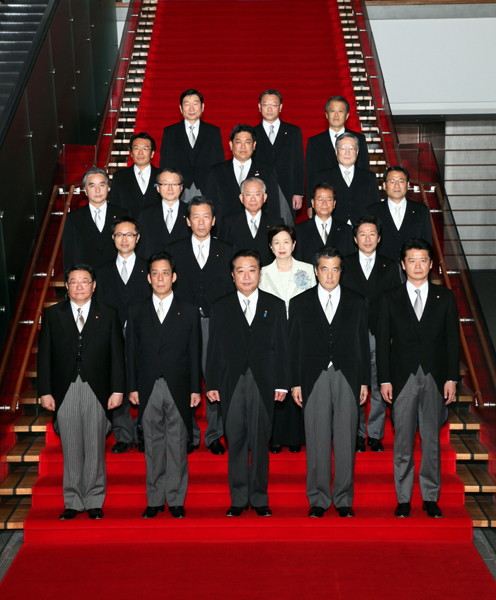
- Prime Minister Yoshihiko Noda (front row, centre) with his reshuffled cabinet inside the Kantei, June 4, 2012
- Date formed: June 4, 2012
- Date dissolved: October 1, 2012

People and organisations
- Emperor: Akihito
- Prime Minister: Yoshihiko Noda
- Deputy Prime Minister: Katsuya Okada (from January 13, 2012)
- Member party: Democratic Party of Japan; People's New Party
- Status in legislature: Coalition government HoR (Lower): Supermajority coalition HoC (Upper): Minority coalition
- Opposition party: Liberal Democratic Party; Komeito; Japanese Communist Party; Your Party; Social Democratic Party
- Opposition leader: Sadakazu Tanigaki (until September 26, 2012); Shinzo Abe (from September 26, 2012)

History
- Legislature terms: HoR: 2009–2012; HoC: 2007–2013 and 2010–2016
- Predecessor: Noda Cabinet (First Reshuffle)
- Successor: Noda Cabinet (Third Reshuffle)

Noda Cabinet from June 4 to October 1, 2012
Portfolio	Minister		Term
Prime Minister	Yoshihiko Noda	R	June 4 – October 1, 2012
Deputy Prime Minister; Minister of State for Government Revitalization	Katsuya Okada	R	June 4 – October 1, 2012
Minister for Internal Affairs and Communications; Minister of State for Okinawa and Northern Territories Affairs; Minister of State for Promotion of Local Sovereignty	Tatsuo Kawabata	R	June 4 – October 1, 2012
Minister of Justice	Makoto Taki	R	June 4 – October 1, 2012
Minister of Foreign Affairs	Kōichirō Genba	R	June 4 – October 1, 2012
Minister of Finance	Jun Azumi	R	June 4 – October 1, 2012
Minister of Education, Culture, Sports, Science and Technology	Hirofumi Hirano	R	June 4 – October 1, 2012
Minister of Health, Labour, and Welfare; Minister of State for Measures for Declining Birthrate	Yōko Komiyama	R	June 4 – October 1, 2012
Minister of Agriculture, Forestry and Fisheries	Akira Gunji	C	June 4 – October 1, 2012
Minister of Economy, Trade and Industry; Minister of State for the Corporation in Support of Compensation for Nuclear Damage	Yukio Edano	R	June 4 – October 1, 2012
Minister of Land, Infrastructure, Transport and Tourism	Yūichirō Hata	C	June 4 – October 1, 2012
Minister of the Environment; Minister of State for the Nuclear Power Policy and Administration; Minister of State for Nuclear Emergency Preparedness	Gōshi Hosono	R	June 4 – October 1, 2012
Minister of Defence	Satoshi Morimoto	N	June 4 – October 1, 2012
Chief Cabinet Secretary	Osamu Fujimura	R	June 4 – October 1, 2012
Minister for Reconstruction	Tatsuo Hirano	C	June 4 – October 1, 2012
Chairman of the National Public Safety Commission; Minister of State for Consumer Affairs and Food Safety	Jin Matsubara	R	June 4 – October 1, 2012
Minister of State for Disaster Management; Minister of State for Gender Equality; Minister of State for the New Public Commons	Masaharu Nakagawa	R	June 4 – October 1, 2012
Minister of State for Financial Services; Minister of State for Postal Reform	Tadahiro Matsushita	C	June 4 – September 10, 2012
Minister of State for Financial Services; Minister of State for Postal Reform	Jun Azumi	R	September 10 – October 1, 2012
Minister of State for Economic and Fiscal Policy; Minister of State for Science and Technology Policy; Minister of State for Space Policy	Motohisa Furukawa	R	June 4 – October 1, 2012

=== Third reshuffled cabinet ===
Noda Cabinet (Third Reshuffle)
- 95th Cabinet of Japan
- October – December 2012
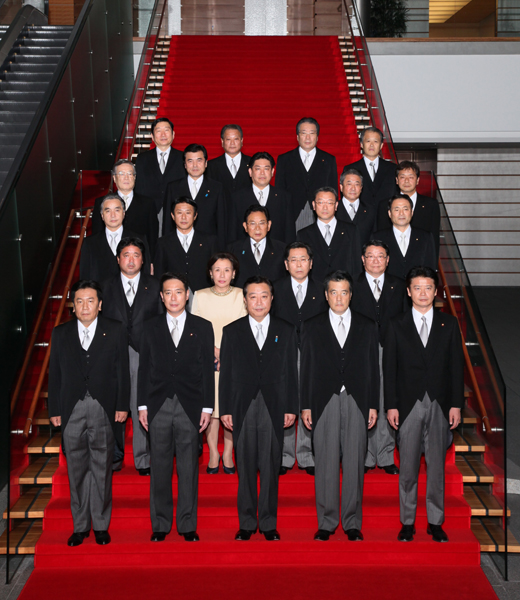
- Prime Minister Yoshihiko Noda (front row, centre) with his reshuffled cabinet inside the Kantei, October 1, 2012
- Date formed: October 1, 2012
- Date dissolved: December 26, 2012

People and organisations
- Emperor: Akihito
- Prime Minister: Yoshihiko Noda
- Deputy Prime Minister: Katsuya Okada (from January 13, 2012)
- Member party: Democratic Party of Japan; People's New Party
- Status in legislature: Coalition government HoR (Lower): Majority coalition HoC (Upper): Minority coalition
- Opposition party: Liberal Democratic Party; Komeito; Japanese Communist Party; Your Party; Social Democratic Party
- Opposition leader: Sadakazu Tanigaki (until September 26, 2012); Shinzo Abe (from September 26, 2012)

History
- Outgoing election: 46th general election (2012)
- Legislature terms: HoR: 2009–2012; HoC: 2007–2013 and 2010–2016
- Predecessor: Noda Cabinet (Second Reshuffle)
- Successor: Second Abe Cabinet

Noda Cabinet from October 1 to December 26, 2012
Portfolio	Minister		Term
Prime Minister	Yoshihiko Noda	R	October 1 – December 26, 2012
Deputy Prime Minister; Minister of State for Government Revitalization	Katsuya Okada	R	October 1 – December 26, 2012
Minister for Internal Affairs and Communications; Minister of State for Okinawa and Northern Territories Affairs; Minister of State for Promotion of Local Sovereignty	Shinji Tarutoko	R→N	October 1 – December 26, 2012
Minister of Justice	Keishū Tanaka	R	October 1–23, 2012
Minister of Justice	Tadamasa Kodaira	R	October 23–24, 2012
Minister of Justice	Makoto Taki	R→N	October 24 – December 26, 2012
Minister of Foreign Affairs	Kōichirō Genba	R	October 1 – December 26, 2012
Minister of Finance	Kōriki Jōjima	R→N	October 1 – December 26, 2012
Minister of Education, Culture, Sports, Science and Technology	Makiko Tanaka	R→N	October 1 – December 26, 2012
Minister of Health, Labour, and Welfare	Wakio Mitsui	R→N	October 1 – December 26, 2012
Minister of Agriculture, Forestry and Fisheries	Akira Gunji	C	October 1 – December 26, 2012
Minister of Economy, Trade and Industry; Minister of State for the Corporation in Support of Compensation for Nuclear Damage	Yukio Edano	R	October 1 – December 26, 2012
Minister of Land, Infrastructure, Transport and Tourism	Yūichirō Hata	C	October 1 – December 26, 2012
Minister of the Environment; Minister of State for Nuclear Emergency Preparedness	Hiroyuki Nagahama	C	October 1 – December 26, 2012
Minister of Defence	Satoshi Morimoto	N	October 1 – December 26, 2012
Chief Cabinet Secretary	Osamu Fujimura	R→N	October 1 – December 26, 2012
Minister for Reconstruction	Tatsuo Hirano	C	October 1 – December 26, 2012
Chairman of the National Public Safety Commission; Minister of State for Consumer Affairs and Food Safety	Tadamasa Kodaira	R→N	October 1 – December 26, 2012
Minister of State for Financial Services; Minister of State for Postal Reform; Minister of State for Gender Equality; Minister of State for the New Public Commons; Minister of State for Measures for Declining Birthrate	Ikkō Nakatsuka	R→N	October 1 – December 26, 2012
Minister of State for Economic and Fiscal Policy; Minister of State for Science and Technology Policy; Minister of State for the Nuclear Power Policy and Administration; Minister of State for Space Policy	Seiji Maehara	R	October 1 – December 26, 2012
Minister of State for Disaster Management	Mikio Shimoji	R→N	October 1 – December 26, 2012

Preceded by Kan Cabinet	Cabinet of Japan; 2011–2012	Succeeded by Second Abe Cabinet
