= Asahiko =

- Gender: Male

Origin
- Origin: Japanese
- Meaning: Different meanings depending on the kanji used

Asahiko (written: 朝彦) is a masculine Japanese given name. Notable people with the name include:

- Prince Kuni Asahiko (久邇宮 朝彦親王; 1824–1891), Japanese prince
- Asahiko Mihara (三原 朝彦; born 1947), Japanese politician
