= Kan cabinet =

Cabinet of Japan (2010–2011)

Kan Cabinet
- 94th Cabinet of Japan
- 8 June 2010 – 2 September 2011
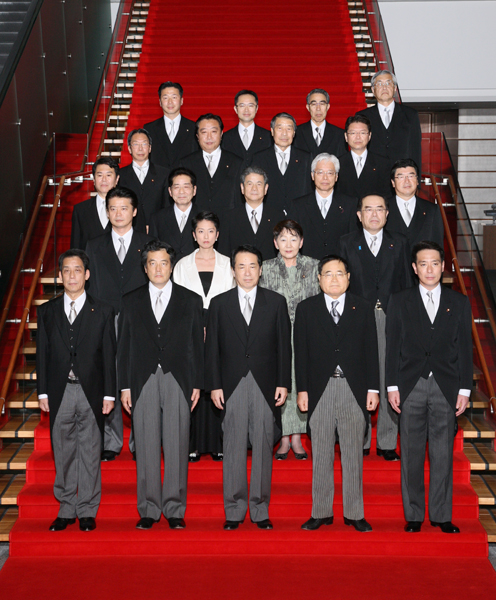
- Prime Minister Naoto Kan (front row, centre) with the newly-elected cabinet inside the Kantei, June 8, 2010
- Date formed: June 8, 2010
- Date dissolved: September 2, 2011

People and organisations
- Head of state: Emperor Akihito
- Head of government: Naoto Kan
- Member party: Democratic Party of Japan; People's New Party
- Status in legislature: Coalition government HoR (Lower): Supermajority coalition HoC (Upper): Majority coalition (until July 2010); Minority coalition (from July 2010)
- Opposition party: Liberal Democratic Party; Komeito; Japanese Communist Party; Your Party; Social Democratic Party
- Opposition leader: Sadakazu Tanigaki

History
- Election: 2010 Japanese House of Councillors election
- Predecessor: Yukio Hatoyama
- Successor: Noda

The Kan Cabinet was the cabinet governing Japan from June 2010 to September 2011 under the leadership of Prime Minister Naoto Kan, who came into power after winning the DPJ leadership election in June 2010. The Kan Cabinet oversaw the response to the aftermath of the 2011 Tōhoku earthquake and tsunami and the scaling-down of Japan's nuclear energy dependence following the nuclear disaster at TEPCO's Fukushima Daiichi nuclear power plant.

== Political background ==
The previous Prime Minister and DPJ president, Yukio Hatoyama resigned on 2 June 2010 on the background of an unpopular deal with the United States to retain the American military base in Okinawa and the DPJ's low poll numbers. Hatoyama's resignation triggered a DPJ presidential election, which was won by Finance Minister Naoto Kan. On 8 June, Kan was formally appointed by the Emperor as Prime Minister of Japan. The new prime minister conducted a cabinet reshuffle and promoted some senior party members to important portfolios, notably Yoshihiko Noda to the Ministry of Finance and Yoshito Sengoku to the Cabinet Secretariat. Kan became the second DPJ prime minister in just eight months.

In spite of a temporary recovery in approval ratings, the government lost its majority in the House of Councillors in the July 2010 election and was subsequently dependent on parts of the opposition for getting any bill through the now-divided Diet.

His government poorly handled the response to the massive earthquake and tsunami in northeast Japan. The following nuclear accidents at private utility company TEPCO's nuclear power plant in Fukushima spurred the government to change the course of Japan's energy policy. Reversing the pro-nuclear policy of the previous administrations, Kan's government pushed for a conversion to renewable energy and eventual shut-down of Japan's nuclear plants. Japan's nuclear power plants were completely shut down by May 2012, leaving Japan without nuclear-generated electricity for the first time since 1970. Several of the plants were only brought back online after the DPJ was no longer in government. The LDP government led by Shinzo Abe gradually reopened the nuclear plants, starting with Sendai Nuclear Power Plant in Kyushu in August 2015. The restart has been slow due to legal challenges and heavy domestic opposition.

== Election of the prime minister ==
4 June 2010
House of Representatives Absolute majority (239/477) required
Choice	Vote	
Choice	Caucuses	Votes
Naoto Kan	DPJ (309), PNP (3), Independent [Speaker] (1)	313 / 477
Sadakazu Tanigaki	LDP (115), Independent [Vice Speaker] (1)	116 / 477
Natsuo Yamaguchi	Kōmeitō (21)	21 / 477
Kazuo Shii	JCP (9)	9 / 477
Mizuho Fukushima	Social Democratic Party of Japan (7)	7 / 477
Yoshimi Watanabe	Your Party (5)	5 / 477
Takeo Hiranuma	Sunrise Party (3), Hiranuma Group independents (2)	5 / 477
Yōichi Masuzoe	Independent (1)	1 / 477
Did not vote	Independent (2), DPJ (1)	3 / 480
Source: 174th Diet Session (House of Representatives) (roll call only lists individual votes, not grouped by caucus)

4 June 2010
House of Councillors Absolute majority (119/237) required
Choice	Vote	
Choice	Caucuses	Votes
Naoto Kan	DPJーShin-RyokufūkaiーPNP (122), Independent (1)	123 / 237
Sadakazu Tanigaki	LDP (68), Independent [Yasuhiro Ōe and Tamon Hasegawa] (2), Independent [Vice President] (1)	71 / 237
Natsuo Yamaguchi	Kōmeitō (21)	21 / 237
Kazuo Shii	JCP (7)	7 / 237
Mizuho Fukushima	Social Democratic Party of Japan (5), Independent (1)	6 / 237
Yōichi Masuzoe	New Renaissance Party (6)	6 / 237
Takeo Hiranuma	Sunrise Party (2)	2 / 237
Yoshimi Watanabe	Independent (1)	1 / 237
Did not vote	LDP (2), HRP (1), Independent [President] (1)	4 / 242
Vacant		1 / 242
Source: 174th Diet Session (House of Councillors) (lists individual votes grouped by caucus)

== Lists of ministers ==
Democratic
People's New
Independent
R = Member of the House of Representatives
C = Member of the House of Councillors
N = Non-Diet member
Italics denote acting minister

=== Cabinet ===
Kan Cabinet from June 8 to September 17, 2010
Portfolio	Minister		Term
Prime Minister	Naoto Kan	R	June 8 – September 17, 2010
Minister for Internal Affairs and Communications; Minister of State for Promotion of Local Sovereignty	Kazuhiro Haraguchi	R	June 8 – September 17, 2010
Minister of Justice	Keiko Chiba	C → N	June 8 – September 17, 2010
Minister of Foreign Affairs	Katsuya Okada	R	June 8 – September 17, 2010
Minister of Finance	Yoshihiko Noda	R	June 8 – September 17, 2010
Minister of Education, Culture, Sports, Science and Technology; Minister of State for Science and Technology Policy	Tatsuo Kawabata	R	June 8 – September 17, 2010
Minister of Health, Labour, and Welfare; Minister of State for Pension Reform	Akira Nagatsuma	R	June 8 – September 17, 2010
Minister of Agriculture, Forestry and Fisheries	Masahiko Yamada	R	June 8 – September 17, 2010
Minister of Economy, Trade and Industry	Masayuki Naoshima	C	June 8 – September 17, 2010
Minister of Land, Infrastructure, Transport and Tourism; Minister of State for Okinawa and Northern Territories Affairs	Seiji Maehara	R	June 8 – September 17, 2010
Minister of the Environment	Sakihito Ozawa	R	June 8 – September 17, 2010
Minister of Defence	Toshimi Kitazawa	C	June 8 – September 17, 2010
Chief Cabinet Secretary	Yoshito Sengoku	R	June 8 – September 17, 2010
Chairman of the National Public Safety Commission; Minister of State for Disaster Management	Hiroshi Nakai	R	June 8 – September 17, 2010
Minister of State for Financial Services; Minister of State for Postal Reform	Shizuka Kamei	R	June 8–11, 2010
Minister of State for Financial Services; Minister of State for Postal Reform	Yoshito Sengoku	R	June 11, 2010
Minister of State for Financial Services; Minister of State for Postal Reform	Shōzaburō Jimi	C	June 11 – September 17, 2010
Minister of State for Consumer Affairs and Food Safety; Minister of State for Economic and Fiscal Policy	Satoshi Arai	R	June 8 – September 17, 2010
Minister of State for Measures for Declining Birthrate; Minister of State for Gender Equality; Minister of State for the New Public Commons	Koichiro Genba	R	June 8 – September 17, 2010
Minister of State for Promotion of Local Sovereignty	Kazuhiro Haraguchi	R	June 8 – September 17, 2010
Minister of State for Government Revitalization	Renho	C	June 8 – September 17, 2010

=== First reshuffled cabinet ===
Kan Cabinet (First Reshuffle)
- 94th Cabinet of Japan

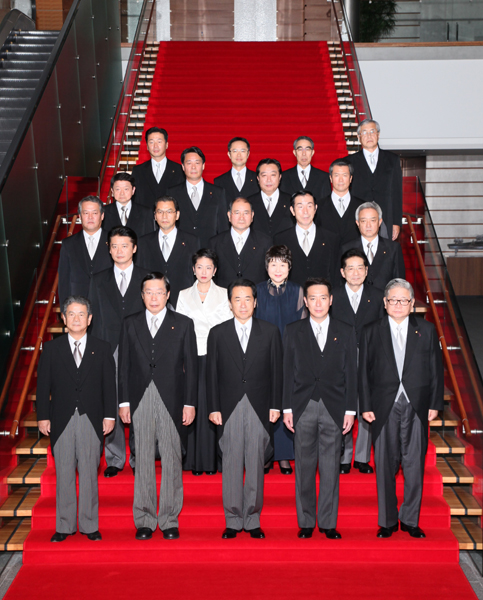
- Prime Minister Naoto Kan (front row, centre) with his reshuffled cabinet inside the Kantei, September 17, 2010
- Date formed: September 17, 2010
- Date dissolved: January 14, 2011

People and organisations
- Head of state: Emperor Akihito
- Head of government: Naoto Kan
- Member party: Democratic Party of Japan; People's New Party
- Status in legislature: Coalition government HoR (Lower): Supermajority coalition HoC (Upper): Minority coalition
- Opposition party: Liberal Democratic Party; Komeito; Japanese Communist Party; Your Party; Social Democratic Party
- Opposition leader: Sadakazu Tanigaki

History
- Election: 2010 councillors election
- Predecessor: Kan Cabinet
- Successor: Kan Cabinet (Second Reshuffle)

Kan Cabinet from September 17, 2010, to January 14, 2011
Portfolio	Minister		Term
Prime Minister	Naoto Kan	R	September 17, 2010 – January 14, 2011
Minister for Internal Affairs and Communications; Minister of State for Promotion of Local Sovereignty	Yoshihiro Katayama	N	September 17, 2010 – January 14, 2011
Minister of Justice	Minoru Yanagida	C	September 17 – November 22, 2010
Minister of Justice	Yoshito Sengoku	R	November 22, 2010 – January 14, 2011
Minister of Foreign Affairs	Seiji Maehara	R	September 17, 2010 – January 14, 2011
Minister of Finance	Yoshihiko Noda	R	September 17, 2010 – January 14, 2011
Minister of Education, Culture, Sports, Science and Technology	Yoshiaki Takaki	R	September 17, 2010 – January 14, 2011
Minister of Health, Labour, and Welfare; Minister of State for Pension Reform	Ritsuo Hosokawa	R	September 17, 2010 – January 14, 2011
Minister of Agriculture, Forestry and Fisheries	Michihiko Kano	R	September 17, 2010 – January 14, 2011
Minister of Economy, Trade and Industry	Akihiro Ohata	R	September 17, 2010 – January 14, 2011
Minister of Land, Infrastructure, Transport and Tourism; Minister of State for Okinawa and Northern Territories Affairs	Sumio Mabuchi	R	September 17, 2010 – January 14, 2011
Minister of the Environment; Minister of State for Disaster Management	Ryu Matsumoto	R	September 17, 2010 – January 14, 2011
Minister of Defence	Toshimi Kitazawa	C	September 17, 2010 – January 14, 2011
Chief Cabinet Secretary	Yoshito Sengoku	R	September 17, 2010 – January 14, 2011
Chairman of the National Public Safety Commission; Minister of State for Consumer Affairs and Food Safety; Minister of State for Measures for Declining Birthrate; Minister of State for Gender Equality	Tomiko Okazaki	R	September 17, 2010 – January 14, 2011
Minister of State for Financial Services; Minister of State for Postal Reform	Shōzaburō Jimi	C	September 17, 2010 – January 14, 2011
Minister of State for Economic and Fiscal Policy; Minister of State for Science and Technology Policy	Banri Kaieda	R	September 17, 2010 – January 14, 2011
Minister of State for the New Public Commons	Koichiro Genba	R	September 17, 2010 – January 14, 2011
Minister of State for Government Revitalization	Renho	C	September 17, 2010 – January 14, 2011

=== Second reshuffled cabinet ===
Kan Cabinet (Second Reshuffle)
- 94th Cabinet of Japan

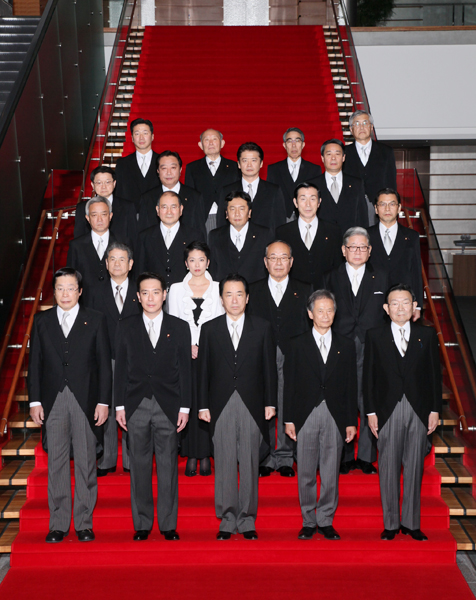
- Prime Minister Naoto Kan (front row, centre) with his reshuffled cabinet inside the Kantei, January 14, 2011
- Date formed: January 14, 2011
- Date dissolved: September 2, 2011

People and organisations
- Head of state: Emperor Akihito
- Head of government: Naoto Kan
- Member party: Democratic Party of Japan; People's New Party
- Status in legislature: Coalition government HoR (Lower): Supermajority coalition HoC (Upper): Minority coalition
- Opposition party: Liberal Democratic Party; Komeito; Japanese Communist Party; Your Party; Social Democratic Party
- Opposition leader: Sadakazu Tanigaki

History
- Election: 2010 councillors election
- Predecessor: Kan Cabinet (First Reshuffle)
- Successor: Noda Cabinet

Kan Cabinet from January 14 to September 2, 2011
Portfolio	Minister		Term
Prime Minister	Naoto Kan	R	January 14 – September 2, 2011
Minister for Internal Affairs and Communications; Minister of State for Promotion of Local Sovereignty	Yoshihiro Katayama	N	January 14 – September 2, 2011
Minister of Justice	Satsuki Eda	C	January 14 – September 2, 2011
Minister of Foreign Affairs	Seiji Maehara	R	January 14 – March 7, 2011
Minister of Foreign Affairs	Yukio Edano	R	March 7–9, 2011
Minister of Foreign Affairs	Takeaki Matsumoto	R	March 9 – September 2, 2011
Minister of Finance	Yoshihiko Noda	R	January 14 – September 2, 2011
Minister of Education, Culture, Sports, Science and Technology	Yoshiaki Takaki	R	January 14 – September 2, 2011
Minister of Health, Labour, and Welfare; Minister of State for Pension Reform	Ritsuo Hosokawa	R	January 14 – September 2, 2011
Minister of Agriculture, Forestry and Fisheries	Michihiko Kano	R	January 14 – September 2, 2011
Minister of Economy, Trade and Industry	Banri Kaieda	R	January 14 – September 2, 2011
Minister of Land, Infrastructure, Transport and Tourism	Akihiro Ohata	R	January 14 – September 2, 2011
Minister of the Environment	Ryu Matsumoto	R	January 14 – June 27, 2011
Minister of the Environment	Satsuki Eda	R	June 27 – September 2, 2011
Minister of Defence	Toshimi Kitazawa	C	January 14 – September 2, 2011
Chief Cabinet Secretary; Minister of State for Okinawa and Northern Territories Affairs	Yukio Edano	R	January 14 – September 2, 2011
Chairman of the National Public Safety Commission; Minister for the Abduction Issue	Kansei Nakano	R	January 14 – September 2, 2011
Minister of State for Disaster Management	Ryu Matsumoto	R	January 14 – July 7, 2011
Minister of State for Disaster Management	Tatsuo Hirano	C	July 7 – September 2, 2011
Minister of State for Financial Services; Minister of State for Postal Reform	Shōzaburō Jimi	C	January 14 – September 2, 2011
Minister of State for Consumer Affairs and Food Safety	Renho	C	January 14 – June 27, 2011
Minister of State for Consumer Affairs and Food Safety	Goshi Hosono	R	June 27 – September 2, 2011
Minister of State for Economic and Fiscal Policy; Minister of State for Measures for Declining Birthrate; Minister of State for Gender Equality; Minister for Total Reform of Social Security and Tax	Kaoru Yosano	R	January 14 – September 2, 2011
Minister of State for Science and Technology Policy; Minister of State for the New Public Commons; Minister for Space Policy	Koichiro Genba	R	September 17, 2010 – January 14, 2011
Minister of State for Government Revitalization	Renho	C	January 14 – June 27, 2011
Minister of State for Government Revitalization	Yukio Edano	R	June 27 – September 2, 2011
Minister of State for the Corporation in Support of Compensation for Nuclear Damage; Minister for Power Saving Promotion; Minister for the Restoration from and Prevention of Nuclear Accident	Goshi Hosono	R	August 10 – September 2, 2011
