= Asahiko Mihara =

Japanese politician (born 1947)

- 三原 朝彦
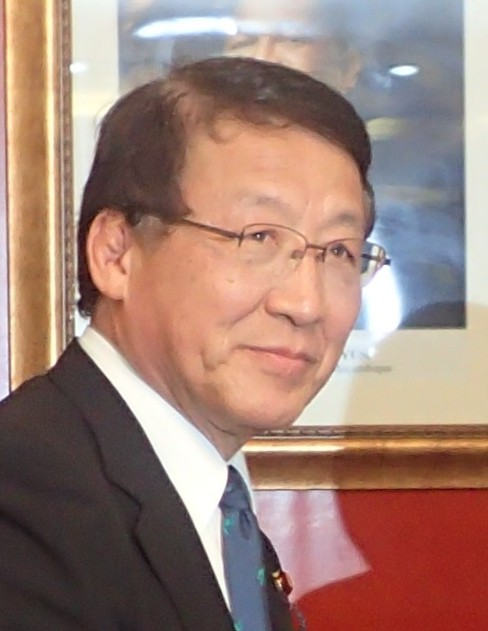
- Mihara in 2020

Member of the House of Representatives
- In office 19 December 2012 – 14 October 2021
- Preceded by: Rintarō Ogata
- Succeeded by: Rintarō Ogata
- Constituency: Fukuoka 9th
- In office 21 October 2003 – 21 July 2009
- Constituency: Kyushu PR
- In office 8 July 1986 – 27 September 1996
- Preceded by: Asao Mihara
- Succeeded by: Constituency abolished
- Constituency: Fukuoka 2nd

Personal details
- Born: 23 May 1947 (age 79) Onga, Fukuoka, Japan
- Party: Liberal Democratic
- Other political affiliations: NPS (1993–1997)
- Parent: Asao Mihara (father)
- Education: Hitotsubashi University; Carleton University

Asahiko Mihara (三原 朝彦, Mihara Asahiko; born 23 May 1947) is a former Japanese politician of the Liberal Democratic Party (LDP), who served as a member of the House of Representatives in the Diet (national legislature). A native of Onga, Fukuoka, he attended Hitotsubashi University and Dag Hammarskjöld College in the United States, and received a master's degree from Carleton University in Canada. He was elected to the House of Representatives for the first time in 1986. He participated in the formation of the New Party Sakigake in 1993 but later returned to the LDP. He was defeated in the 2009 election by DPJ candidate Rintaro Ogata.

Representative Mihara was re-elected in 2012 to the Fukuoka Prefectural 9th district. He is a member of the Party Ethics and Fundamental National Policies Committees as well as the Director of the Special Committee on Promotion of Science and Technology, and Innovation.

In 2004, Mihara received political donations of ¥ 300,000 from organizations related to the Unification Church.

Mihara is a member of the Diet groups of Nippon Kaigi, an openly revisionist lobby, and Shintō Seiji Renmei, a fundamentalist Shintō lobby.
