= Kazuya Shimba =

Japanese politician

- 榛葉 賀津也
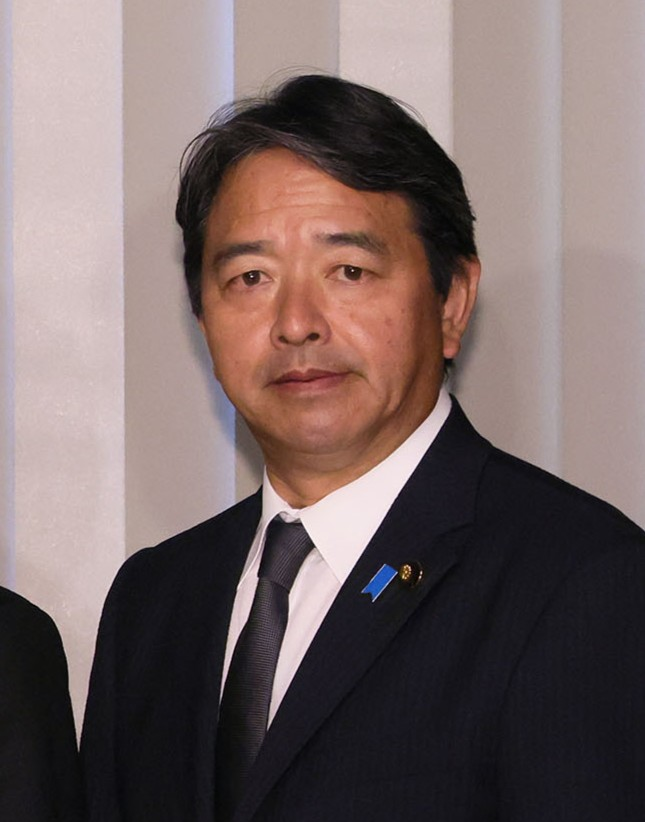
- Shimba in 2023

Secretary-General of the Democratic Party For the People
- Incumbent
- Assumed office 7 May 2018
- Leader: Kohei Otsuka; Yuichiro Tamaki; Motohisa Furukawa
- Preceded by: Position established

Member of the House of Councillors
- Incumbent
- Assumed office 29 July 2001
- Preceded by: Masataka Suzuki
- Constituency: Shizuoka at-large

Member of the Kikugawa Town Council
- In office 1994–1998

Personal details
- Born: 25 April 1967 (age 59) Ogasa, Shizuoka, Japan
- Party: DPP (since 2018)
- Other political affiliations: LDP (1994–2000); DPJ (2000–2016); DP (2016–2018)
- Children: 3
- Education: Otterbein University

Kazuya Shimba (榛葉 賀津也, Shinba Kazuya; born 25 April 1967) is a Japanese politician, the general-secretary of the Democratic Party for the People (DPP). He is serving as a member of the House of Councillors. Known as Yuichiro Tamaki's right-hand man, he played a key role in the DPP's surge

== Early life and education ==
Kazuya Shimba was born in Kikugawa, Shizuoka Prefecture on 25 April 1967. His father is Tatsuo Shimba, a local councilor who also served as mayor of Kikugawa.

After graduating high school, Shimba went to the United States to study political science at Otterbein University in Ohio, where he earned a bachelor's degree. He also went to a university in Israel.

== Political career ==
After returning to Japan, Shimba became a Kikugawa assemblyman in 1994. He ran an unsuccessful campaign in the 1998 Kikugawa mayoral election.

In 2001 House of Councillors election, Shimba ran as a Democratic Party candidate in Shizuoka at-large district and got elected.

His focus is on diplomacy and defense, serving as Vice Minister of Defense and Vice Minister of Foreign Affairs.

After the dissolution of the DPJ, he joined the Democratic Party For the People and currently serves as the secretary general of the Democratic Party For the People.

He is on close enough terms with Tarō Asō to lend and borrow manga with him (though he later clarified in a YouTube interview that he did not actually borrow manga, and had only made the comment as a joke to reporters), and despite being in the opposition, he maintains a relatively cooperative stance toward the Takaichi administration. Additionally, he is well known for his pro-Israel political leanings.

House of Councillors
Preceded by Toshimi Kitazawa	Chair, Upper House Committee on Foreign Affairs and Defense; 2001–2002	Succeeded by Naoki Tanaka
Preceded by Toshiharu Todoroki	Chair, Upper House Special Committee on Political Ethics and Election System; 2013	Succeeded by Takeshi Maeda
Preceded by Shoji Namba	Chair, Upper House Committee on Cabinet; 2017	Succeeded by Yoshifumi Tuge
Political offices
Preceded by Seigo Kitamura	State Minister of Defense; 2009–2010	Succeeded by Jun Azumi
Preceded by Tsuyoshi Yamaguchi, Ryuji Yamane	State Minister for Foreign Affairs; 2012; Served alongside: Shuji Kira	Succeeded by Shun'ichi Suzuki, Masaji Matsuyama
Party political offices
Preceded by Shuji Ikeguchi	Chair, DPJ Diet Affairs Committee in the House of Councillors; 2013–2015	Succeeded by Toshiyuki Kato
Preceded by Toshiyuki Kato	Chair, DPJ Diet Affairs Committee in the House of Councillors; 2016–2017	Succeeded by Masayoshi Nataniya
