= Rintaro Ogata =

Japanese politician (born 1973)

- 緒方 林太郎
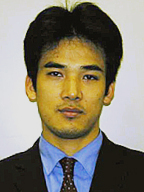

Member of the House of Representatives
- Incumbent
- Assumed office 3 November 2021
- Preceded by: Asahiko Mihara
- Constituency: Fukuoka 9th
- In office 19 December 2014 – 28 September 2017
- Constituency: Kyushu PR
- In office 31 August 2009 – 16 November 2012
- Preceded by: Asahiko Mihara
- Succeeded by: Asahiko Mihara
- Constituency: Fukuoka 9th

Personal details
- Born: 8 January 1973 (age 53) Yahatanishi, Fukuoka, Japan
- Party: Independent (since 2018)
- Other political affiliations: DPJ (2009–2016); DP (2016–2017); KnT (2017–2018)
- Education: University of Tokyo

Rintaro Ogata (緒方林太郎, Ogata Rintaro; born 8 January 1973) is a Japanese politician. He has been a member of the House of Representatives since 2021, having previously served from 2009 to 2012 and from 2014 to 2017. From 1994 to 2005, he worked at the Ministry of Foreign Affairs.
