= Kumiko Aihara =

Japanese politician (born 1947)

- 相原 久美子

Member of House of Councillors
- In office 29 July 2007 – 28 July 2019
- Constituency: National PR

Personal details
- Born: 14 March 1947 (age 79) Mikasa, Hokkaido, Japan
- Party: CDP (since 2018)
- Other political affiliations: DPJ (2007–2016); DP (2016–2018)
- Education: Hokkai Gakuen University

Kumiko Aihara (相原 久美子, Aihara Kumiko; born 14 March 1947) is a Japanese politician of the Constitutional Democratic Party and a member of the House of Councillors in the Diet (national legislature). A native of Hokkaidō and law graduate of Hokkai Gakuen University, she was elected for the first time in 2007.
