= Toru Kikawada =

Japanese politician

- 黄川田 徹
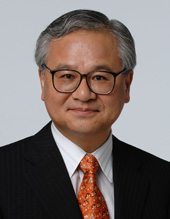
- Official portrait, 2012

Member of the House of Representatives
- In office 25 June 2000 – 28 September 2017
- Preceded by: Yōhei Sasaki
- Succeeded by: Ichirō Ozawa
- Constituency: Iwate 3rd

Member of the Iwate Prefectural Assembly
- In office 1995–2000
- Constituency: Rikuzentakata City

Personal details
- Born: 14 October 1953 (age 72) Kesen, Iwate, Japan
- Party: CDP (since 2019)
- Other political affiliations: NFP (1994–1998); LP (1998–2003); DPJ (2003–2016); DP (2016–2018); DPP (2018–2019)
- Education: Waseda University

Toru Kikawada (黄川田 徹, Kikawada Tōru; born 14 October 1953) is a former Japanese politician of the Democratic Party of Japan (DPJ), who served as a member of the House of Representatives in the Diet (national legislature).

== Early life ==
Kikiwada is native of Rikuzentakata, Iwate. He graduated from Waseda University, then worked at the city government of Rikuzentakata from 1977 to 1994.

== Political career ==
After having served in the Iwate Prefectural Assembly for two terms from 1995, he was elected to the House of Representatives for the first time in 2000 as a member of Ichirō Ozawa's Liberal Party, which merged with the DPJ in 2003.
