= Kenzo Fujisue =

Japanese politician

- 藤末 健三
- Official portrait, 2012

Member of the House of Councillors
- In office 26 July 2004 – 15 June 2022
- Preceded by: Multi-member district
- Succeeded by: Kaoru Tashiro
- Constituency: National PR

Personal details
- Born: 18 February 1964 (age 62) Kumamoto City, Kumamoto, Japan
- Party: Liberal Democratic (since 2022)
- Other political affiliations: DPJ (2004–2016); DP (2016–2017); Independent (2017–2022)
- Education: Tokyo Institute of Technology; Massachusetts Institute of Technology; Harvard University; Waseda University

Kenzo Fujisue (藤末 健三, Fujisue Kenzō; born 18 February 1964) is a Japanese politician of the Liberal Democratic Party of Japan, a member of the House of Councillors in the Diet (national legislature). A native of Kumamoto, Kumamoto, he graduated from Tokyo Institute of Technology and received master's degrees from Massachusetts Institute of Technology and Harvard University in the United States. He was elected to the House of Councillors for the first time in 2004 when he left an assistant professorship at the University of Tokyo.
