= Masao Kobayashi =

Japanese politician (born 1947)

- 小林 正夫
- Official portrait, 2010

Member of the House of Councillors
- In office 26 July 2004 – 25 July 2022
- Constituency: National PR

Personal details
- Born: 11 May 1947 (age 79) Nakano, Tokyo, Japan
- Party: DPP (since 2018)
- Other political affiliations: DPJ (2004–2016); DP (2016–2018)

Masao Kobayashi (小林 正夫, Kobayashi Masao; born May 11, 1947) is a Japanese politician of the Democratic Party of Japan, a member of the House of Councillors in the Diet (national legislature). A native of Nakano, Tokyo and high school graduate, he was elected to the House of Councillors for the first time in 2004.
