= Goshi Hosono =

Japanese politician (born 1971)

- 細野 豪志
- Official portrait, 2026

Minister for Reconstruction
- Incumbent
- Assumed office 17 September 2026
- Prime Minister: Sanae Takaichi
- Preceded by: Takao Makino

Minister of the Environment
- In office 2 September 2011 – 1 October 2012
- Prime Minister: Yoshihiko Noda
- Preceded by: Satsuki Eda
- Succeeded by: Hiroyuki Nagahama

Member of the House of Representatives
- Incumbent
- Assumed office 26 June 2000
- Preceded by: Yoshiaki Kibe
- Constituency: Shizuoka 7th (2000–2003); Shizuoka 5th (2003–present)

Personal details
- Born: 21 August 1971 (age 55) Ayabe, Kyoto, Japan
- Party: LDP (since 2021)
- Other political affiliations: DPJ (2000–2016); DP (2016–2017); KnT (2017–2018); Independent (2018–2021)
- Education: Kyoto University

Goshi Hosono (細野 豪志, Hosono Gōshi; born 21 August 1971) is a Japanese politician and a member of the House of Representatives in the Diet (national legislature). A native of Ōmihachiman, Shiga and graduate of Kyoto University, he was elected to the House of Representatives for the first time in 2000. He was the Minister of Environment and Minister of State for Nuclear Power Policy and Administration in the cabinet of Yoshihiko Noda. He represents the 5th District of Shizuoka prefecture.

== Career ==
=== As a DPJ politician ===
In the 2000 Japanese general, Hosono was elected for the first time as a DPJ candidate in Shizuoka 7th district election, defeating the LDP's incumbent.

In the 2003 general election, he moved to Shizuoka 5th district due to a change in the division of constituency and won the election for the second time, defeating Toshitsugu Saito (LDP).

In September 2011, he was appointed Minister of the Environment of Noda Cabinet.

Goshi Hosono considered running in the September 2012 DPJ presidential elections against incumbent Yoshihiko Noda, but was eventually dissuaded from doing so by senior members of the party.

Goshi Hosono was a protégé of DPJ Secretary General Azuma Koshiishi, who saw him as a potential future Prime Minister.

After Noda's re-election as party president, and re-appointment of Koshiishi as Secretary General of the DPJ, Noda persuaded Hosono to become chairman of the party Policy Research Committee. The appointment of the popular 41-year-old Hosono was seen as important in preparing for the upcoming general election.

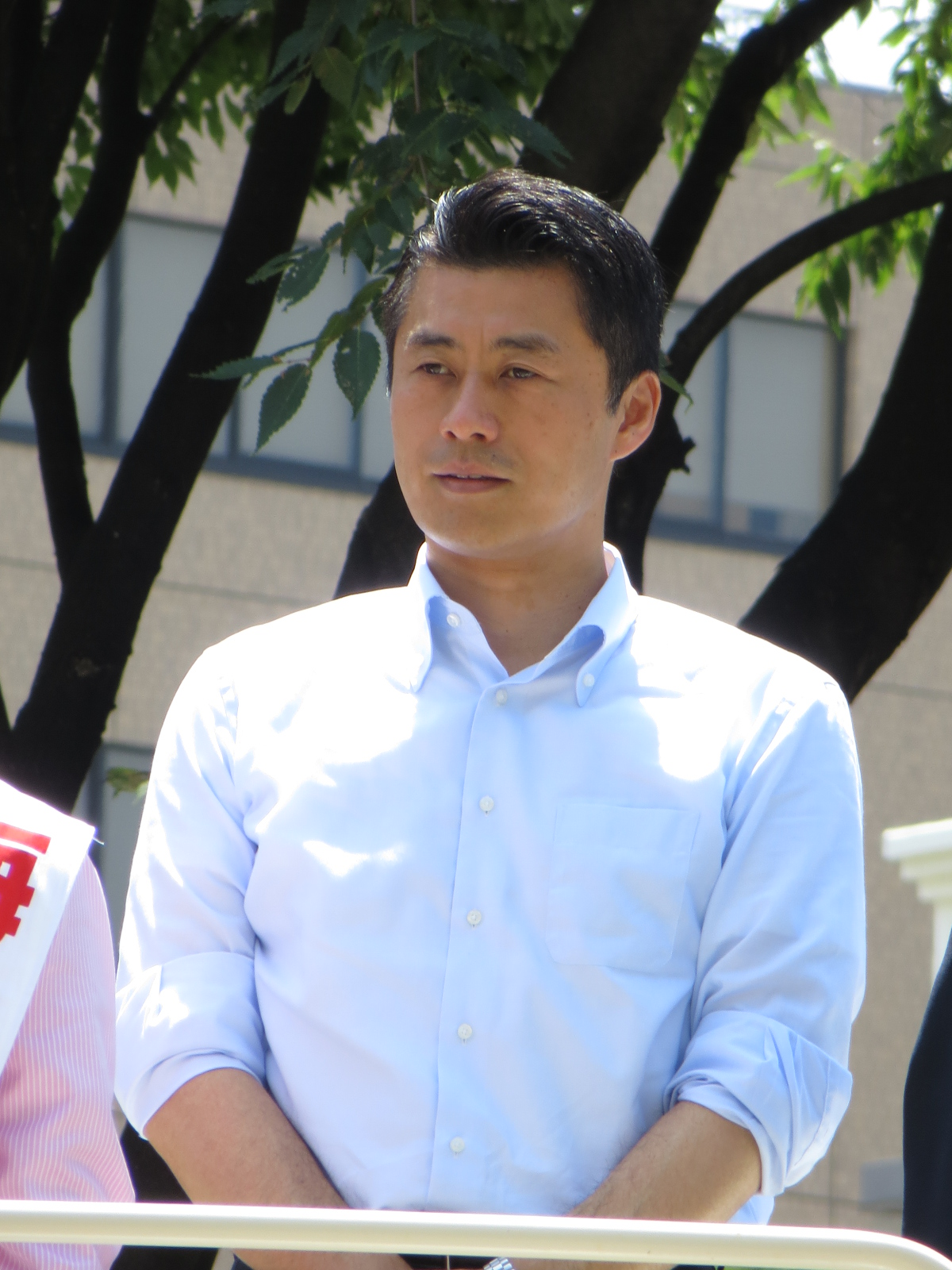
Hosono in 2013

After the DPJ's loss in the December 2012 election, the party went into opposition. Hosono was cited as a possible successor to the party's leader Banri Kaieda. After Kaieda was defeated in the 2014 election, Hosono ran for the DPJ leadership, but was defeated by former party president Katsuya Okada.

=== Formation of a Conservative Opposition Party ===
In August 2017, Hosono left the Democratic Party, the successor of the DPJ, with the intention to form his own political party. His reason for wanting to leave the party was because of its policy on security and amending the Constitution. In September, he collaborated with Tokyo governor Yuriko Koike and Diet member Masaru Wakasa to form a conservative opposition party named the Kibō no Tō. After the then-DP leader Seiji Maehara allowed party members to run under the Kibō banner in the imminent general election, conservative-leaning DP representatives moved to Hope en masse. However, a significant bloc of ex-DP representatives were barred from running under the Kibō ticket by then-party leader Koike. Several of these representatives then formed the Constitutional Democratic Party (CDP) to house liberal-leaning former DP members. Some chose to run as independents, including Yoshihiko Noda and Katsuya Okada.

Despite appearing at the start of the campaign to be able to deprive Prime Minister Shinzo Abe of his majority, campaign blunders by Koike led the party to fall short of initial expectations. Hope lost seats and only became the second largest opposition party behind the CDP, which ran a relatively successful campaign despite being hastily established.

=== Defection to the LDP ===
When Kibō no Tō merged with the Democratic Party in May 2018 to form the Democratic Party for the People, Hosono decided to not join the new party and became an independent member instead. Hosono later joined Shisuikai, One of the LDP faction which LDP-Secretary-General Toshihiro Nikai leads, in January 2019 while remaining as an independent.

As he approached Nikai, Hosono sought to join the LDP, and LDP-Secretary-General Nikai moved to support Hosono. However, in Hosono's constituency, Shizuoka 5th, LDP's Takeru Yoshikawa was a candidate for the LDP. As a result, local organizations such as LDP Shizuoka confederation, which had been at odds with Hosono, kept the movement of the Nikai in check.

In October 2021, Fumio Kishida, Leader of Kōchikai, One of the LDP faction, to which Yoshikawa belongs, was elected President of the Liberal Democratic Party and dissolved the House of Representatives. LDP nominated Yoshikawa as a Shizuoka 5th candidate. Therefore, Hosono ran as an independent candidate in the 2021 general election. As a result, Hosono beat Yoshikawa by a large margin, and Defeated Yoshikawa won a seat in the PR block. After the election, on November 5, LDP headquarters rejected opposition from local organization such as LDP Shizuoka 5th district branch and allowed Hosono to join the LDP. Hosono said, "I make efforts to make them understand," considering the opposition from local lawmakers belonging to LDP Shizuoka 5th district branch, which had been at odds in the past when Hosono had belonged to the DPJ.

In June 2022, some media reported that Yoshikawa had a date with minors accompanied by drinking. In Japan, people under the age of 20 are prohibited from drinking alcohol by law. Following a series of reports, Yoshikawa left the LDP. On May 29, 2023, LDP Shizuoka Prefecture Confederation appointed Hosono as the head of the Shizuoka 5th district branch, which had been vacant since Yoshikawa left the LDP.

In the 2024 LDP presidential election, Hosono endorsed Shigeru Ishiba as a recommender.

== Election history ==
Election	Age	District	Political party	Number of votes	election results
2000 Japanese general election	28	Shizuoka 7th district	DPJ	73,044	Won
2003 Japanese general election	32	Shizuoka 5th district	DPJ	137,201	Won
2005 Japanese general election	34	Shizuoka 5th district	DPJ	148,002	Won
2009 Japanese general election	38	Shizuoka 5th district	DPJ	184,328	Won
2012 Japanese general election	41	Shizuoka 5th district	DPJ	156,887	Won
2014 Japanese general election	43	Shizuoka 5th district	DPJ	143,012	Won
2017 Japanese general election	46	Shizuoka 5th district	KnT	137,523	Won
2021 Japanese general election	50	Shizuoka 5th district	Independent	127,580	Won
2024 Japanese general election	53	Shizuoka 5th district	LDP	141,021	Won
2026 Japanese general election	54	Shizuoka 5th district	LDP	168,511	Won
