= Renhō =

Japanese politician (born 1967)

- 蓮舫
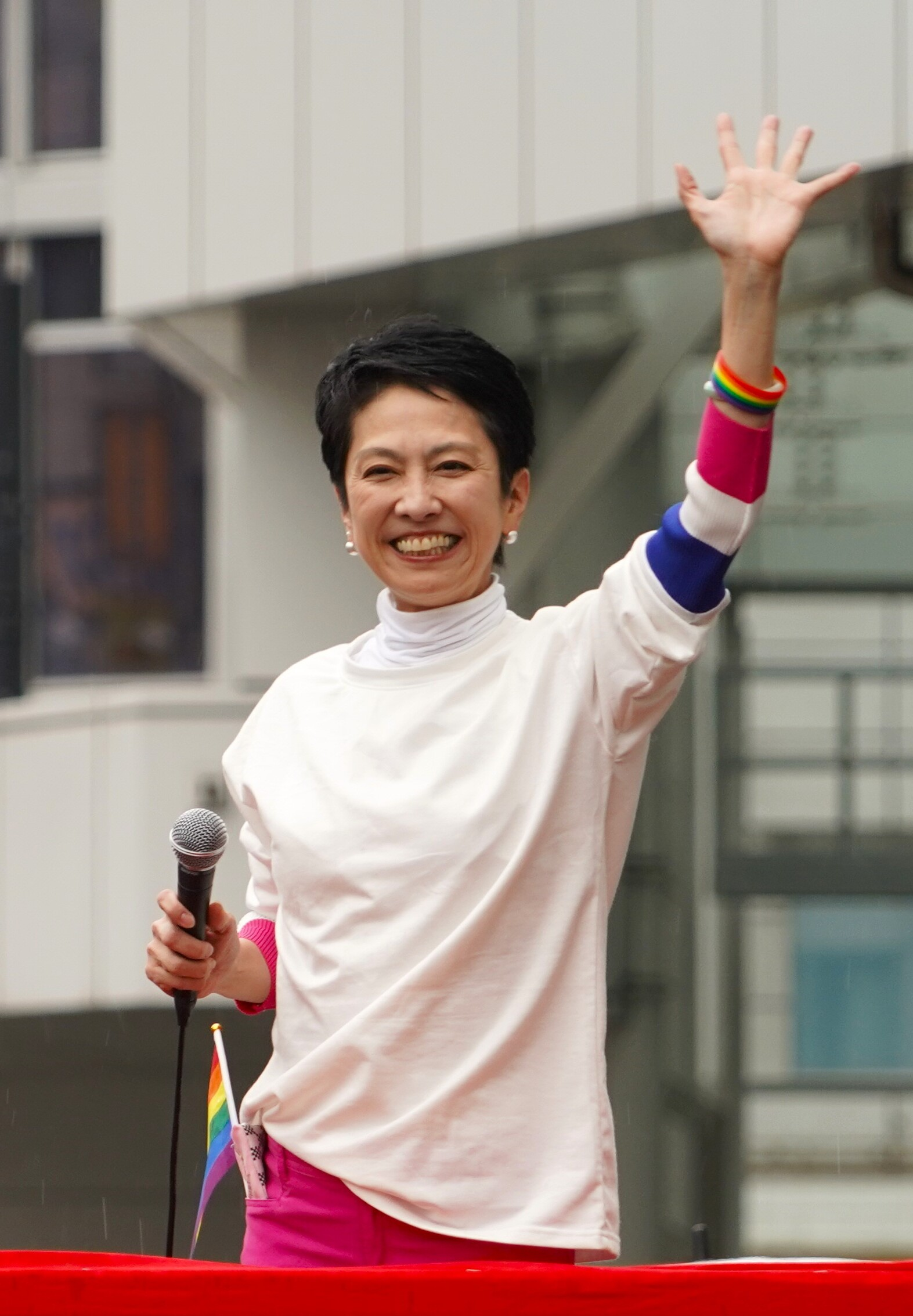
- Renhō in 2024

President of the Democratic Party
- In office 1 October 2016 – 27 July 2017
- Preceded by: Katsuya Okada
- Succeeded by: Seiji Maehara

Minister of State for Government Revitalization
- In office 2 September 2011 – 13 January 2012
- Prime Minister: Yoshihiko Noda
- Preceded by: Yukio Edano
- Succeeded by: Katsuya Okada
- In office 8 June 2010 – 27 June 2011
- Prime Minister: Naoto Kan
- Preceded by: Yukio Edano
- Succeeded by: Yukio Edano

Minister of State for Consumer Affairs and Food Safety
- In office 14 January 2011 – 27 June 2011
- Prime Minister: Naoto Kan
- Preceded by: Tomiko Okazaki
- Succeeded by: Goshi Hosono

Member of the House of Councillors
- Incumbent
- Assumed office 28 July 2025
- Constituency: National PR
- In office 26 July 2004 – 20 June 2024
- Preceded by: Miyo Inoue
- Succeeded by: Ayaka Shiomura
- Constituency: Tokyo at-large

Personal details
- Born: Hsieh Lien-fang (謝蓮舫); 28 November 1967 (age 58) Meguro, Tokyo, Japan
- Citizenship: Republic of China (until 2016); Japan (since 1985)
- Party: CDP (2017–2024; 2025–present)
- Other political affiliations: DPJ (2004–2016); DP (2016–2017); Independent (2024–2025)
- Spouse: Nobuyuki Murata (m. 1993; div. 2020)
- Children: 2
- Education: Aoyama Gakuin University; Peking University
- Website: www.renho.jp

Renhō

Chinese name
- Traditional Chinese: 謝蓮舫
- Simplified Chinese: 谢莲舫
Transcriptions
Standard Mandarin
- Hanyu Pinyin: Xiè Liánfǎng
- Bopomofo: ㄒㄧㄝˋ ㄌㄧㄢˊ ㄈㄤˇ
- Wade–Giles: Hsieh^{4} Lien^{2}-fang^{3}
- IPA: [ɕjê ljɛ̌n.fàŋ]
Yue: Cantonese
- Yale Romanization: Jeh Lìhnfóng
- Jyutping: ze6 lin4 fong2
- IPA: [tsɛ˨ lin˩.fɔŋ˧˥]
Southern Min
- Hokkien POJ: Siā Liân-hong

Japanese name
- Hiragana: さいとう れんほう
- Kyūjitai: 齊藤 蓮舫
- Shinjitai: 斉藤 蓮舫
Transcriptions
- Revised Hepburn: Saitō Renhō
- Kunrei-shiki: Saitô Renhô

Former Japanese name

Japanese name
- Hiragana: むらた
- Kyūjitai: 村田
- Shinjitai: 村田
Transcriptions
- Revised Hepburn: Murata
- Kunrei-shiki: Murata

Renhō Saitō (斉藤 蓮舫, Saitō Renhō; née Hsieh (謝), formerly Murata (村田); born 28 November 1967), known mononymously as Renhō, is a Japanese politician and former journalist who has served as a member of the House of Councillors from 2004 to 2024, and again since 2025. She was the leader of the now-defunct major opposition party, the Democratic Party from 2016 to 2017. Renhō was a candidate for the 2024 Tokyo gubernatorial election with the support of the Constitutional Democratic Party (CDP), Japanese Communist Party (JCP), and the Social Democratic Party (SDP), but was defeated by incumbent Yuriko Koike, placing third behind Shinji Ishimaru.

== Early and personal life ==
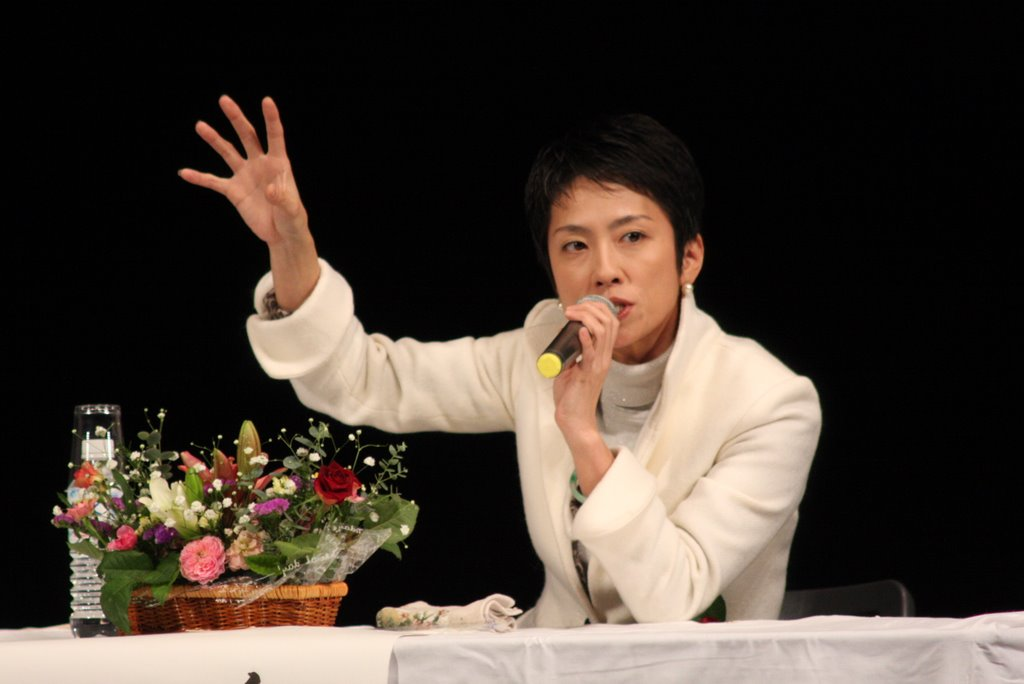
Renhō in 2008

Renhō was born Hsieh Lien-fang (traditional Chinese: 謝蓮舫; ; pinyin: Xiè Liánfǎng; Japanese pronunciation: Sha Renhō) in Tokyo to a Japanese mother Keiko Saitō (斉藤圭子 Saitō Keiko) and Han Taiwanese father Hsieh Ge-hsin (謝哲信 Xiè Zhéxìn). She has two brothers: one is a year older, the other is two years younger. Mark Chen, a Taiwanese politician and former Secretary-General of the Office of the President of the Republic of China, is a distant relative of hers. She studied at Aoyama Gakuin in Tokyo from kindergarten through university. She enrolled in the law faculty of Aoyama Gakuin University and graduated in 1990 with the B.L. degree in Public Law.

Born as a citizen of Taiwan, she did not become a citizen of Japan until 1985 when Japanese nationality law was amended to allow Japanese mothers to pass Japanese nationality to their children. She was legally a dual citizen until 2016. She adopted her mother's surname, Saitō (斉藤), when she acquired Japanese citizenship; to avoid name confusion in her career, she began to go simply by Renhō.

After her debut as a Clarion Girl in 1988, Renhō appeared on several television and radio programs as a commentator. In 1993, she became a newscaster on TBS and TV Asahi, covering several historical events including the Great Hanshin earthquake in 1995, sometimes alongside Sanae Takaichi.

She was married in 1993. She is fluent in Mandarin Chinese and had also studied it at Peking University in Beijing, China, from 1995 to 1997. Renhō returned to television in 2000, anchoring and reporting on several TBS programs. She reported from Taiwan during Chen Shui-bian's presidential campaign, which brought her to the attention of Taiwanese political leaders. In Taiwan, she is often referred to as Lien-fang, the Standard Chinese pronunciation of her given name.

== Political career ==
In July 2004, Renhō was elected to the House of Councillors representing Tokyo as a member of the Democratic Party of Japan. Since election, she has been heavily involved in parenting issues and policies. Renhō has criticized Japan's diplomacy with the People's Republic of China and its refusal to recognize Taiwan, stating that "Japan is too polite when dealing with China, taking a low profile" and "Taiwan is my father's country. Why isn't Taiwan a country?" Since taking office, she has traveled to Taiwan several times on official and unofficial business, garnering extensive public and media attention, and has become close to senior members of the Democratic Progressive Party.

=== DPJ government (2009–12) ===
After the DPJ assumed the reins of government in September 2009, she received much public attention for her stern stance and direct questions to bureaucrats during special fiscal screening committees of the Government Revitalization Unit established under Prime Minister Yukio Hatoyama.

In June 2010, then Prime Minister Naoto Kan appointed her as Minister for Administrative Reforms. Upon taking the post, Renhō stated that she would be giving particular attention to eliminating waste in the 21 government account. She lost her seat in Cabinet in a subsequent reshuffle, but was retained as a special advisor to the Prime Minister.

In the 2010 House of Councillors election, she garnered a record 1,710,734 constituency votes.

She served as a member of the Cabinet of Japan from 2010 to 2012, serving as Minister for Government Revitalisation and Minister of State for Consumer Affairs and Food Safety. In September 2011, she was re-appointed as State Minister of Government Revitalization (responsible for administrative reforms) in the cabinet of then prime minister Yoshihiko Noda. Her new portfolio also included responsibility for civil service reform, gender equality and Japan's declining birthrate. She served in this post until a cabinet reshuffle in January 2012.

The DPJ was ousted from government in the 2012 general election, following which Renhō returned to the opposition bench. She retained her seat in the 2016 House of Councillors Election.

=== Leader of the Democratic Party (2016–17) ===
In September 2016, she was elected as the leader of Japan's Democratic Party, making her the first woman elected as their leader, and the first person with mixed ethnic heritage and born with foreign citizenship to head a major political party in Japan. As head of the Democratic Party, she stated her opposition to revisions of Article 9 of the Constitution, but that she was willing to join debates with the Liberal Democratic Party on other constitutional revisions. She viewed Abenomics to be a partial success, but pushes for greater investment in education, child-rearing and nursing care. She also ruled out forming a coalition government with the Japanese Communist Party and opposed the TPP.

During the presidential election, Renhō claimed that she had given up her Taiwanese citizenship. However, reports emerged that her Taiwanese citizenship had not been properly renounced. In response to doubts regarding her legal status, she took steps to renounce her Taiwanese citizenship beginning in late 2016.

In July 2017, the Democratic Party suffered a very poor showing in the Tokyo prefectural election. Some senior party members blamed the results, in part, on the ongoing questions surrounding Renhō's citizenship. In response to these concerns, she provided evidence of her renunciation of Taiwanese citizenship at a press conference later that month. Days after her press conference, and days following the resignation of former prime minister Yoshihiko Noda as party secretary-general, Renhō resigned as party leader, stating that she had not shown sufficient ability to lead it.

=== In the CDP (2017–present) ===
Dissatisfied with the ambiguous direction of the DP leadership post the 2017 election, Renhō expressed interest in joining the new progressive Constitutional Democratic Party and had an exploratory talk with CDP leader Yukio Edano in mid-December. She applied to join the CDP on 26 December 2017, citing the DP's lack of policy directions and the CDP's conversely clear policy directions. The CDP admitted her into the party on 28 December 2017.

On 27 May 2024, Renhō announced that she would run in the 2024 Tokyo gubernatorial election, an office held at the time by Yuriko Koike. She automatically lost her seat in the House of Councillors on 20 June, the day of the official announcement (kokuji) of the gubernatorial election. Renhō underperformed expectations, securing 1,283,262 votes, accounting for 18.8% of the total vote share.

In June 2025, it was announced that she had returned to the CDP since leaving in 2024, being declared a proportional list candidate for the party in the 2025 Japanese House of Councillors election.

== Family ==
Renhō married journalist Nobuyuki Murata (村田 信之, Murata Nobuyuki) in August 1993, and gave birth to fraternal twins Rin (a boy) and Suiran (a girl) in 1997; Rin went on to become a male "idol" performer. The couple divorced by mutual consent in August 2020. According to her ex-husband, Renhō proposed the divorce as she wanted to stay in Tokyo and continue her political work, while her husband wanted to move out of the city. Following the divorce, her ex-husband told a television reporter that "our relationship hasn't changed; we just don't live together."

House of Councillors
Preceded by Toshio Ogawa; Toshiko Hamayotsu; Miyo Inoue; Atsuo Nakamura	Councillor for Tokyo's At-large district 2004– Served alongside: Masaharu Nakagawa, Toshio Ogawa, Yūji Sawa, Toshiko Takeya, Kōta Matsuda	Incumbent
Political offices
Preceded by Yukio Edano	Minister of State for Government Revitalization; 2010–2011	Succeeded by Yukio Edano
Preceded by Kōichirō Genba	Minister of State for Civil Service Reform; 2010–2011	Succeeded by Kansei Nakano
Preceded by Tomiko Okazaki	Minister of State for Consumer Affairs and Food Safety; 2011	Succeeded by Goshi Hosono
