= Masayoshi Nataniya =

Japanese politician

- 那谷屋 正義
- Official portrait, 2012

Member of House of Councillors
- In office 26 July 2004 – 25 July 2022
- Constituency: National PR

Personal details
- Born: 3 August 1957 (age 69) Yokohama, Kanagawa, Japan
- Party: CDP (since 2018)
- Other political affiliations: DPJ (2004–2016); DP (2016–2018)
- Education: Yokohama National University
- Website: Official website

Masayoshi Nataniya (那谷屋 正義, Nataniya Masayoshi; born 3 August 1957) is a Japanese politician of the Constitutional Democratic Party and a member of the House of Councillors in the Diet (national legislature). A native of Yokohama, Kanagawa and graduate of Yokohama National University, he was elected for the first time in 2004.
