= Takeshi Shina =

Japanese politician (born 1966)

- 階 猛
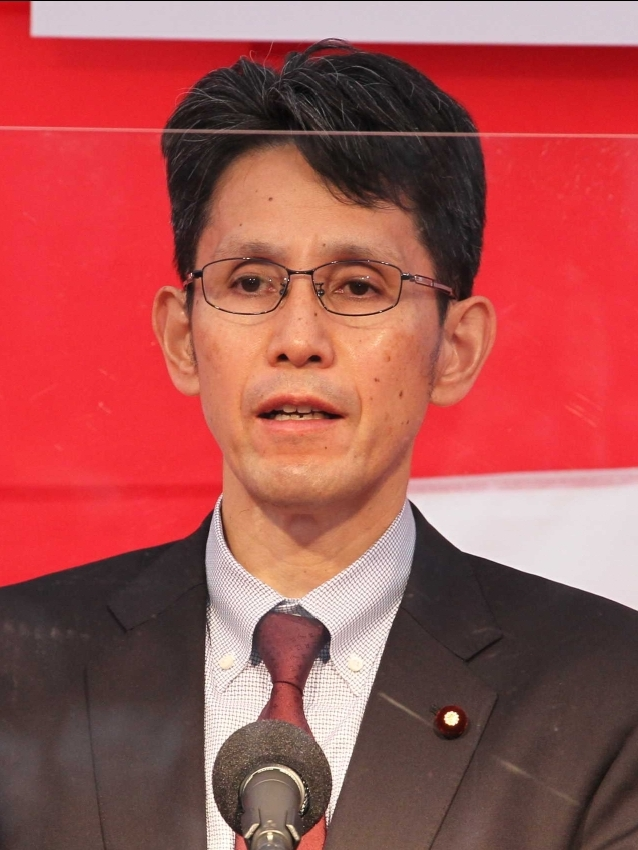
- Shina in 2020

Secretary-General of the Democratic Reform Party
- Incumbent
- Assumed office 17 September 2026
- Leader: Junya Ogawa
- Preceded by: Party established

Secretary-General of the Centrist Reform Alliance
- In office 18 February 2026 – 17 September 2026
- Leader: Junya Ogawa
- Preceded by: Jun Azumi; Hiromasa Nakano
- Succeeded by: Office abolished

Member of the House of Representatives
- Incumbent
- Assumed office 29 July 2007
- Preceded by: Takuya Tasso
- Constituency: Iwate 1st

Personal details
- Born: 7 October 1966 (age 60) Morioka, Iwate, Japan
- Party: DRP
- Other political affiliations: DPJ (2007–2016); DP (2016–2017); KnT (2017–2018); DPP (2018–2019); Independent (2019–2020); CDP (2020–2026); CRA (2026)
- Education: University of Tokyo

Takeshi Shina (階 猛, Shina Takeshi; born 7 October 1966) is a Japanese politician who has served as a member of the House of Representatives since 2007. A 1991 graduate of the University of Tokyo, he was elected for the first time in 2007. Shina was born and grew up in Morioka, Iwate before attending the University of Tokyo. After he graduated, he became a banker at both the Long-Term Credit Bank of Japan and the SBI Shinsei Bank.

Shina first ran for office in a 2007 by-election following the resignation of his High School and University senior, Takuya Tasso, in Iwate's 1st district. He won in 2009 and was tapped to become a Parliamentary Vice-Minister for Internal Affairs and Communications, and served through the Kan Cabinet. Following his vote against the consumption tax raise launched by the Noda Cabinet, he was suspended by the DPJ for two months but declined to leave the party, and won in 2012 despite facing a candidate handpicked by Ichiro Ozawa to defeat him, and the strong national headwinds in favor of the LDP.

Following the defeat, Shina was shuffled throughout various DPJ party positions, serving as a shadow minister in the NEXT Cabinets of varying leaders. He won in 2014 again and merged with the DP in merging with Kibō no Tō, holding onto his district in 2017. He joined the DPP before leaving the party following the Iwate's branch decision to endorse a candidate from Ichiro Ozawa's Liberal Party. He joined the CDP shortly thereafter and fought attempts by the Prefectural Branch controlled by Ozawa to replace him as the candidate in Iwate's 1st, winning in 2021. He was appointed the Shadow Minister of Finance in the Next Cabinet's of Kenta Izumi and Yoshihiko Noda until September 2025. He won his district in 2026 after joining the CRA, becoming one of the "seven samurai" to do so.

He ran for party president in the 2026 CRA election, losing to Junya Ogawa by five votes. He was then appointed secretary-general of the CRA.

== Career ==
=== Early life ===
Shina was born in Morioka, Iwate. He graduated from Shizukuishi Elementary School, Shizukuishi Junior High School, and Morioka First High School. After 2 years of studying for entrance exams, he applied and entered the University of Tokyo. He was a member of the baseball teams in high school and university, and pitched for Tokyo's baseball team. In 1991, he graduated from the University of Tokyo Law and Politics School, and joined the Long-Term Credit Bank of Japan (now the SBI Shinsei Bank). He worked in corporate sales and market departments, and became assistant general manager of the General Finance department and assistant general manager of the legal department, but the bank went bankrupt in 1998 and reformed into the SBI Shinsei Bank.

He then passed the bar exam while still employed, completed his legal training, and registered with the Tokyo Bar Association. He became deputy chief of the legal department at Shinsei Bank.

=== Democratic Party ===
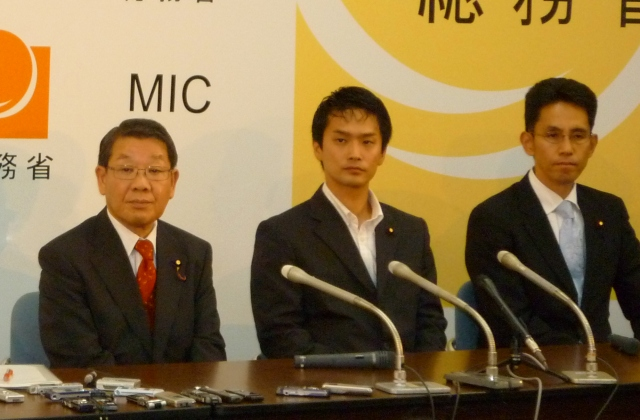
Kensei Hasegawa, Junya Ogawa, and Shina after being appointed as Parliamentary Vice-Minister for Internal Affairs and Communications

In 2007, he ran as the Democratic Party endorsed candidate in the Iwate 1st district by-election following the candidacy of his High School and University senior, Takuya Tasso, for the Governorship of Iwate. He defeated Masanori Tamazawa of the LDP by a wide margin.

He was re-elected in the 2009 election that saw the DPJ be swept into power. He was appointed Parliamentary Vice-Minister for Internal Affairs and Communications in the Hatoyama Cabinet alongside Junya Ogawa and Kensei Hasegawa. He was reappointed in the new Kan Cabinet.

He was once considered a close ally of Ichiro Ozawa. Following the arrest of Tomohiro Ishikawa, who was Ozawa's close aide and secretary, Shina joined the "Group to Consider the Arrest of Representative Tomohiro Ishikawa", a parliamentary grouping which sought to protect Ozawa from arrest following the Rikuzankai Incident, a corruption scandal involving Ozawa. Ozawa explained himself in a Budget Committee meeting on 26 January 2010, saying that "I have to consider this from the perspective of a Diet member. I have immunity from arrest. It's a natural responsibility." However, relations between Ozawa and Shina quickly deteriorated following the 2011 Tōhoku earthquake and tsunami, and he refused to join the People's Life First party that Ozawa founded in 2011.

In September 2011, he became the Chairman of the DPJ's Financial Statements and Administrative Oversight Committee, and in December, he became Chair of the DPJ's Administrative Reform Research Committee.

In the controversy that surrounded the Noda Cabinet's raise of the consumption tax, he decided to resign as Deputy Chair of the DPJ's Policy Research Council on 30 March 2012. The resignation was accepted at the party's executive meeting on 23 April. In the proceeding vote on the tax raise on 26 June, he voted against it, opposing the official stance of the DPJ. A notice of resignation from the party was later submitted through Kenji Yamaoka and other representatives who defected on the vote came through on 2 July, but Shina refused to leave the party, saying "It was submitted without my consent. I intend to remain in the party." It was later confirmed that Yamaoka submitted the letter without final confirmation from Shina. At an standing executive committee meeting on 3 July, Takeshi was reprimanded with a 2 month long suspension from the party. The decision was confirmed on 9 July.

He held his district in the 2012 Japanese general election, winning against Hinako Takahashi of the LDP, who had run against him in 2009, and Yōko Tasso of the Tomorrow Party of Japan, the wife of his friend and Governor of Iwate Takuya Tasso. Tasso had followed Ichiro Ozawa into the PLF and TPJ. In fact, Ozawa campaigned personally for Tasso in Iwate 1st. The bitter election widened the feud that had spawned out of the Rikuzankai incident between Shina and Ozawa. Takahashi was revived proportionally.

In the December 2012 DPJ leadership election, he supported Banri Kaieda. He was appointed head of the Democratic Party executive office under Secretary-General Goshi Hosono following Kaieda's victory. He won again in 2014 election with a majority against Takahashi, who was revived proportionally again. He was appointed NEXT Minister for Administrative Reform & Reform in the Cabinet Office following the 2015 Democratic Party leadership election.

In September 2016, he was appointed Deputy Chairman of the Democratic Party Policy Research Council and Deputy Chief Cabinet Secretary in the NEXT Cabinet under Renhō. In September 2017, he was appointed Chairman of the Democratic Party's Policy Research Council. He folded with the party into Kibō no Tō and won by a similar margin as 2014 during the 2017 election. Takahashi was again proportionally revived.

In November 2016, it was revealed that the Iwate 1st district branch of the DP, of which Shina was representative, had used political activity funds to purchase tickets for professional wrestling events, and that his fund management organization had improperly used money to purchase tickets for the Iwate Big Bulls. Shina apologized for the mistake.

On 7 May 2018, he joined the DPP, following the merger of Kibo no To and the Democratic Party together. He was appointed chair of the Policy Research Council before resigning from the office on 11 September.

On 11 May 2019, at the Iwate Prefectural Federation meeting of the DPP, he announced his intention to leave the DPP with Toru Kikawada, the Prefectural Federation representative, and other members. He cited the merger of the DPP and Ichiro Ozawa's Liberal Party and the decision by the DPP to run a member of Ozawa's party for the upcoming 2019 Councillor elections in Iwate's district, Takanori Yokozawa. He officially submitted his resignation two days later, and it was accepted by the party on the 29th, making him an independent.

=== Constitutional Democratic Party ===
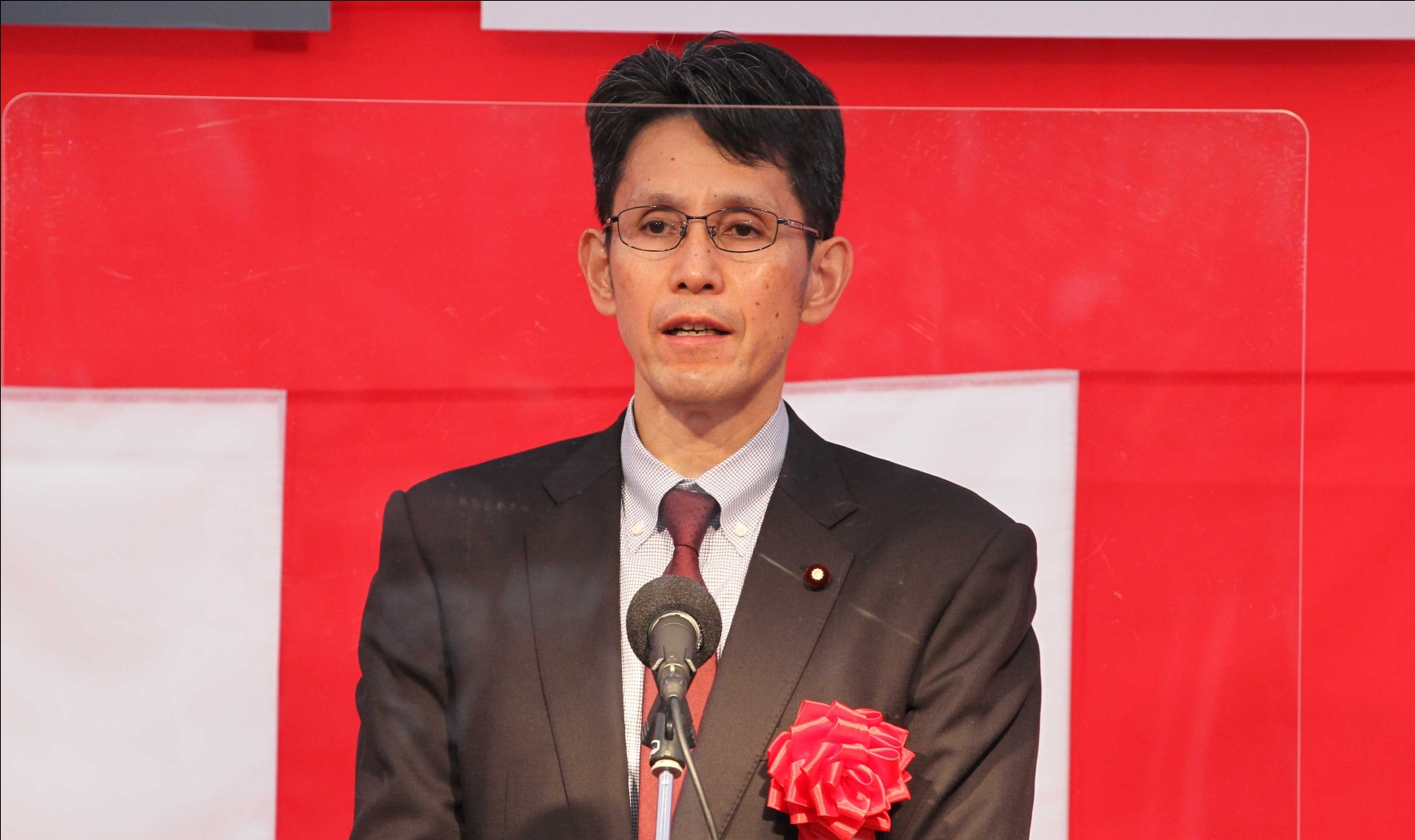
At the Miyako-Morioka Crossing Road opening ceremony on 5 December 2020

He expressed his intention to join the newly merged form of the CDP, DPP, and SDP in July 2020. In the leadership election following, he was a supporter of Kenta Izumi.

It was revealed later that year in October that the Iwate Prefectural Federation of the CDP, led by Ichiro Ozawa, had filed a lawsuit against Shina in the Morioka District Court, seeking 33 million yen (roughly 300,000 USD) in damages. According to Ozawa, before Shina had left the DPP in 2019, he transferred money from the Iwate Prefectural Federation to the political school Shina was a representative of. The feud between Ozawa and Shina had grown to a large degree, and Shina was even denied entrance to the founding meeting of the CDP's Iwate Prefectural Federation.

The feud came to a head in the process of fielding candidates for the 2021 election, when Ozawa and the Iwate Federation decided to endorse newcomer and freelance announcer Rie Sano for Iwate 1st instead of Shina. Iwate governor Takuya Tasso recommended Sano as well, calling Sano the "Rey to Shina and us older generation's Luke Skywalker." This was protested bitterly by Shina.

The feud between Shina and Ozawa had deepened to such a degree that party headquarters were forced to overrule Ozawa and the Prefectural Federation, and once the snap election was called, it was confirmed on 12 October that Shina would run for the 1st district himself with Sano instead being ranked 18th on the proportional block as a purely proportional candidate. On 13 October, the Japanese Communist Party confirmed it would withdraw 22 candidates where it was competing with the CDP. Iwate 1st was not one of them, however, and newcomer Kyoko Yoshida was announced as the candidate for the party.

In the election later that month, Shina won by a similar margin as in 2017. This time, however, Takahashi was not proportionally revived. Sano also lost on the proportional block. Ozawa lost Iwate's 3rd in 2021 and was revived proportionally, which left Shina as the only CDP member representing Iwate in single member districts.

He supported his fellow former Vice-Minister Junya Ogawa in the 2021 CDP leadership election.

The lawsuit headed by Ozawa against Shina came to a head in June 2022, when the Prefectural Federation attempted to withdraw the lawsuit. Shina declined the request, and instead kept the case in the courts. Eventually, Shina was cleared of all legal liability, and it was ruled that the DPP Prefectural Federation had consented to the transfer of the funds.

Shina was appointed the Shadow Minister of Finance in the Next Cabinet of Kenta Izumi when it was re-established on 13 September 2022. He was re-elected in the 2024 election and captured 60% of the vote, an increase of nearly 10%. He defeated newcomer Hiromasa Yonai of the LDP who was not proportionally revived and Kyoko Yoshida, who ran again for the JCP.

Shina met with Sumio Mabuchi on 2 September 2025, and formed a new parliamentary group, the Kinseikai. It was a merger of the groups previously led by Mabuchi and the Jiseikai by Shina, with both co-leading the new grouping.

=== Centrist Reform Alliance ===
Following the merger of the CDP and Komeito into the Centrist Reform Alliance, Shina joined the new political party, and ran in the 2026 Japanese general election. Shina ended up defeating Hiromasa Yonai by a margin of roughly 5000 votes, meaning a 4% margin. Yonai was revived proportionally, and Shina became one of the "seven samurai" of the CRA to win their districts. Ichiro Ozawa was defeated in the election, and was not proportionally revived, meaning that for the first time ever Ozawa would not be sitting in parliament with Shina.

Following the resignation of co-leaders Yoshihiko Noda and Tetsuo Saito, Shina contested the CRA leadership election which followed, but waas narrowly defeated by Junya Ogawa. Ogawa appointed Shina as secretary general and chairman of the election strategy committee.

== Political stances & statements ==
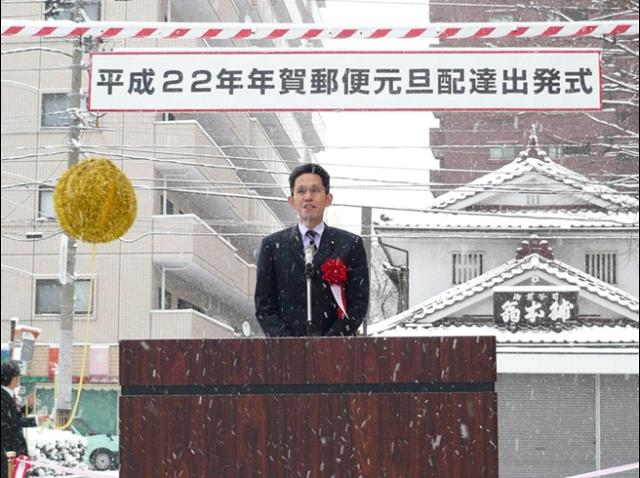
January 1, 2010: Greetings at the New Year's Day delivery ceremony of the Morioka Postal Service

Shina is in favor amending the constitution to restrict the Prime Minister's right to dissolve the House of Representatives, strengthened right to integrity and greater local autonomy. He is opposed to amending Article 9 of the Constitution of Japan and believes defense spending should be at about 2% of the GDP. He is in favor of allowing separate surnames for married couples. He supports the possibility of a female emperor of the patrilineal imperial descent, but opposes allowing a matrilineal emperor.

His pet issue is overhauling the Japanese legal system; Shina is critical of the fact that only graduated law students can pass the bar exam. He is also supportive of the restarting nuclear power plants, provided that they pass proper safety measures.

House of Representatives (Japan)
Vacant Title last held by Takuya Tasso	Representative for Iwate 1st district 2007–present	Incumbent
Preceded by Chinami Nishimura	Chairman of the Committee on Judicial Affairs; 2025–2026	Succeeded by Hidetaka Inoue
Party political offices
Preceded by Hiroshi Ogushi	Chairman of the Policy Research Council, Democratic Party; 2017	Succeeded by Shinya Adachi
Preceded by Jun Azumi; Hiromasa Nakano	Secretary General of the Centrist Reform Alliance; 2026–present	Incumbent
Preceded by Sumio Mabuchi; Kōichi Kasai	Chairman of the Election Strategy Committee, Centrist Reform Alliance; 2026–present	Incumbent
