= Kishida Cabinet =

Kishida Cabinet may refer to:

- First Kishida Cabinet (October–November 2021)
- Second Kishida Cabinet (November 2021–August 2022)
- Second Kishida Cabinet (First Reshuffle) (August 2022–September 2023)
- Second Kishida Cabinet (Second Reshuffle) (September 2023–October 2024)
