= Second Kishida cabinet =

Cabinet of Japan from 2021 to 2024

- 101st Cabinet of Japan
- 10 November 2021 – 1 October 2024
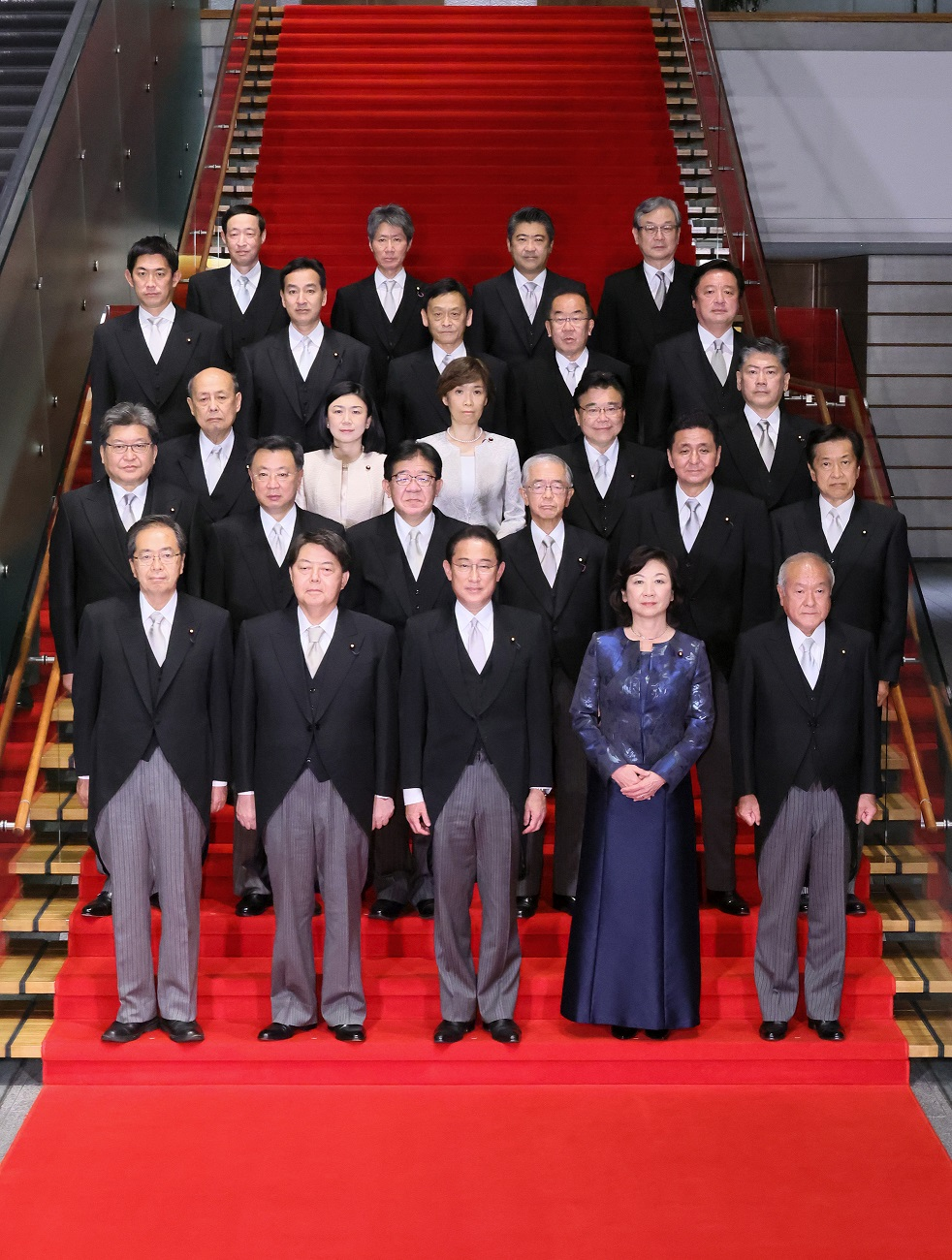
- Prime Minister Fumio Kishida (front row, centre) with the re-elected cabinet inside the Kantei, November 10, 2021
- Date formed: November 10, 2021
- Date dissolved: October 1, 2024

People and organisations
- Emperor: Naruhito
- Prime Minister: Fumio Kishida
- Prime Minister's history: Member of the HoR for Hiroshima 1st district (1993–present); Former Foreign Minister (2012–2017); Former acting Minister of Defense (2017)
- No. of ministers: 20 (2022); 21 (2021–2022)
- Member party: Liberal Democratic Party; Komeito
- Status in legislature: Coalition government HoR (Lower): Majority; HoC (Upper): Majority
- Opposition cabinet: Izumi Next Cabinet (2022–2024); Noda Next Cabinet (2024)
- Opposition party: Constitutional Democratic Party; Japan Innovation Party; Democratic Party For the People; Japanese Communist Party; Reiwa Shinsengumi; Social Democratic Party
- Opposition leader: Kenta Izumi (2021–2024); Yoshihiko Noda (2024)

History
- Elections: 2021/49th HoR general election 2022/26th HoC regular election
- Legislature terms: 206th (National Diet) (49th, HoR; 25th, HoC)
- Predecessor: Kishida I
- Successor: Ishiba I

The Second Kishida cabinet was the 101st Cabinet of Japan and was formed in November 2021 by Fumio Kishida, leader of the Liberal Democratic Party and Prime Minister of Japan.

The government was a coalition between the Liberal Democratic Party and the Komeito and controlled both the upper and lower houses of the National Diet. It was the successor to Kishida's previous cabinet.

Following his resignation, the Second Kishida cabinet was dissolved on October 1, 2024, and replaced with the First Ishiba cabinet.

== Background ==
After Fumio Kishida called for a general election and won a supermajority on 31 October 2021, he was re-elected as the prime minister at a special session of the National Diet on 10 November 2021. As his first cabinet only served 37 days, the shortest term in history, Kishida reappointed nearly all of the ministers from the previous cabinet following re-election.

On 10 August 2022, the cabinet was reshuffled. 7 MPs with ties to the Unification Church (UC) were dismissed following the assassination of former Prime Minister Shinzo Abe and increasing media scrutiny of LDP officials' close ties with the church. On 20 August it was reported that 23 officials including 8 MPs in the new reshuffled cabinet have existing connections to the UC.

=== Controversies between Abe and the Unification Church ===
The reshuffle was widely reported as a response to the local criticism of ties between Kishida's Liberal Democratic Party (LDP) and the Unification Church (UC), following the assassination of the former prime minister, Shinzo Abe, on 8 July 2022. The suspected shooter, Tetsuya Yamagami, revealed that his mother went bankrupt for donating most of the family's wealth and assets to the UC. Although the suspect originally planned to target the leader of the UC, Hak Ja Han, he switched to Abe because he was unable to approach Han, and he considered Abe as one of the most influential supporters of the UC. The revelation renewed local interest in the allegedly long-standing relationship between the LDP and the UC since Abe's maternal grandfather Nobusuke Kishi's tenure, as well as accusations against the UC's practices of collecting donations fraudulently, so-called "spiritual sales". Public opinions on Kishida's decision to hold a state funeral for Abe on 27 September were also divided.

According to a poll conducted by NHK from 5 to 7 August, the approval rating of Kishida's previous cabinet was 46%, down by 13% from a similar poll taken three weeks prior. Also 82% of respondents were not satisfied by the lawmakers' explanations of their ties to the UC.

=== Kishida's responses regarding the Unification Church ===
Kishida stressed that the new cabinet would have all members closely examined with regard to their relationship with the UC, but media reported that at least 30 members in the reshuffled cabinet were still related to the UC to various degrees. One of the ministers who remained in office after this reshuffle, Daishiro Yamagiwa, received media scrutiny in particular for not disclosing his ties with the UC to the public before the reshuffle, as well as his ambiguous responses when being confronted by reporters about his ties to the UC. Kishida accepted Yamagiwa's resignation on 24 October 2022 as the minister following more evidences of Yamagiwa's ties to the UC surfaced and intense criticisms from the opposition parties in the parliament for his failure to remember his participation in events held by the UC and meetings with top UC officials, including the UC leader Hak Ja Han.

After the cabinet reshuffle, a poll conducted from 20 to 21 August by Mainichi Shimbun showed that the approval rating of the new cabinet dropped to 36% by 16%, with 64% of respondents viewing the ties to the UC as a very serious problem.

Kishida promised to cut ties with the UC and help victims of manipulative sales by the UC. Taro Kono, the minister of digital affairs who was also given the special mission for consumer affairs and food safety, established a spiritual sales review committee in the Consumer Affairs Agency on 29 August. This committee initially elected 8 experts in the UC matter including former prosecutor Shiori Kanno and Masaki Kito, a lawyer representing the National Network of Lawyers Against Spiritual Sales which has been providing legal aid for victims and reporting on the anti-social issues of the UC since 1987. The committee was scheduled to hold publicly-viewable weekly online meetings. All committee members offered suggestions for strengthening regulations or enacting preventive measures against spiritual sales.

=== Increase in military budget ===
In December 2022 the Kishida government announced a $320bn increase in military spending, due in part to the 2022 Russian invasion of Ukraine.

=== Second reshuffle ===
As of 2023, Kishida has led four cabinets since the beginning of his premiership in October 2021. His first cabinet lasted just 38 days, and was formed following the resignation of former Prime Minister Yoshide Suga's cabinet. After receiving a mandate in the 2021 general election, Kishida formed his second cabinet in November 2021. He reshuffled it twice, the first time being in August 2022 in the wake of the assassination of former prime minister Shinzo Abe, and the second in September 2023. The second reshuffle includes more women, while also keeping potential political rivals in key roles and positions. In total, eleven first time appointees were introduced in the cabinet.

The cabinet includes five women, only one of which, Sanae Takaichi, was inherited from the previous reshuffled cabinet. Most notably, Kishida replaced Foreign Minister Yoshimasa Hayashi, who had served in his cabinet since after the general election, with Yoko Kamikawa, who had previously served as Minister of Justice under Yoshihide Suga. Kishida also replaced Yasukazu Hamada, who had served as Defense Minister since the first reshuffle, with Minoru Kihara, who had never served as a cabinet minister before. Kishda retained Taro Kono and Sanae Takaichi in similar roles. Both had competed with Kishida for the LDP Presidency in 2021.

== Election of the prime minister ==
10 November 2021 206th Special National Diet Absolute majority (233/465) required
House of Representatives
Choice	Party	First Vote
Choice	Party	Votes
Fumio Kishida	Liberal Democratic Party	297 / 465
Yukio Edano	Constitutional Democratic Party	108 / 465
Toranosuke Katayama	Japan Innovation Party	41 / 465
Yuichiro Tamaki	Democratic Party For the People	11 / 465
Shuji Kira	Independent	5 / 465
Tarō Yamamoto	Reiwa Shinsengumi	3 / 465

10 November 2021 206th Special National Diet Absolute majority (122/242) required
House of Councillors
Choice	Party	First Vote
Choice	Party	Votes
Fumio Kishida	Liberal Democratic Party	141 / 242
Yukio Edano	Constitutional Democratic Party	60 / 242
Toranosuke Katayama	Japan Innovation Party	15 / 242
Yuichiro Tamaki	Democratic Party For the People	15 / 242
Tarō Yamamoto	Reiwa Shinsengumi	3 / 242
Yukiko Kada	Independent	2 / 242
Yoshimi Watanabe	Independent	2 / 242
Takae Itō	Democratic Party For the People	1 / 242
Yōichi Iha	Independent	1 / 242
Blank vote		2 / 242

== Changes ==
- Foreign Minister Toshimitsu Motegi was replaced by Yoshimasa Hayashi, after being chosen as the new LDP Secretary-General due to the resignation of Akira Amari.

== List of ministers ==
Parties
Liberal Democratic
Komeito

R	Member of the House of Representatives
C	Member of the House of Councillors
N	Non-Diet member
B	Bureaucrat

=== Cabinet ===
Citation of this table: List of Second Kishida Cabinet Members

Second Kishida Cabinet from November 10, 2021 to August 10, 2022
Portfolio	Image	Minister		Term	Note
Prime Minister		Fumio Kishida	R	4 October 2021 – 10 August 2022	
Minister for Internal Affairs and Communications		Yasushi Kaneko	R	4 October 2021 – 10 August 2022	
Minister of Justice		Yoshihisa Furukawa	R	4 October 2021 – 10 August 2022	
Minister for Foreign Affairs		Yoshimasa Hayashi	R	10 November 2021 – 10 August 2022	
Minister of Finance; Minister of State for Financial Services; Minister in charge of Overcoming Deflation		Shun'ichi Suzuki	R	4 October 2021 – 10 August 2022	
Minister of Education, Culture, Sports, Science and Technology; Minister in charge of Education Rebuilding		Shinsuke Suematsu	C	4 October 2021 – 10 August 2022	
Minister of Agriculture, Forestry and Fisheries		Genjiro Kaneko	C→N	4 October 2021 – 10 August 2022	
Minister of Health, Labour and Welfare		Shigeyuki Goto	R	4 October 2021 – 10 August 2022	
Minister of Economy, Trade and Industry; Minister in charge of Industrial Competitiveness; Minister for Economic Cooperation with Russia; Minister in charge of the Response to the Economic Impact caused by the Nuclear Accident; Minister of State for the Nuclear Damage Compensation and Decommissioning Facilitation Corporation		Koichi Hagiuda	R	4 October 2021 – 10 August 2022	
Minister of Land, Infrastructure, Transport and Tourism; Minister in charge of Water Cycle Policy		Tetsuo Saito	R	4 October 2021 – 10 August 2022	
Minister of the Environment; Minister of State for Nuclear Emergency Preparedness		Tsuyoshi Yamaguchi	R	4 October 2021 – 10 August 2022	
Minister of Defense		Nobuo Kishi	R	16 September 2020 – 10 August 2022	
Chief Cabinet Secretary; Minister in charge of Mitigating the Impact of U.S. Forces in Okinawa; Minister in charge of the Abductions Issue		Hirokazu Matsuno	R	4 October 2021 – 10 August 2022	
Minister in charge of Promoting Vaccinations		Hirokazu Matsuno	R	1 April 2022 – 10 August 2022	
Minister for Digital; Minister in charge of Administrative Reform; Minister of State for Regulatory Reform		Karen Makishima	R	4 October 2021 – 10 August 2022	
Minister for Reconstruction; Minister in charge of Comprehensive Policy Coordination for Revival from the Nuclear Accident at Fukushima; Minister of State for Okinawa and Northern Territories Affairs		Kosaburo Nishime	R	4 October 2021 – 10 August 2022	
Chairman of the National Public Safety Commission; Minister in charge of Building National Resilience; Minister in charge of Territorial Issues; Minister in charge of Civil Service Reform; Minister of State for Disaster Management and Ocean Policy		Satoshi Ninoyu	C→N	4 October 2021 – 10 August 2022	
Minister of State for Regional Revitalization; Minister of State for Measures for Declining Birthrate; Minister of State for Gender Equality; Minister in charge of Women's Empowerment; Minister in charge of Policies Related to Children; Minister in charge of Measures for Loneliness and Isolation		Seiko Noda	R	4 October 2021 – 10 August 2022	
Minister in charge of Economic Revitalization; Minister in charge of New Capitalism; Minister in charge of Measures for Novel Coronavirus Disease and Health Crisis Management; Minister in charge of Social Security Reform; Minister of State for Economic and Fiscal Policy		Daishiro Yamagiwa	R	4 October 2021 – 10 August 2022	
Minister in charge of Economic Security; Minister of State for Science and Technology Policy; Minister of State for Space Policy; Minister of State for Economic Security		Takayuki Kobayashi	R	4 October 2021 – 10 August 2022	
Minister for the World Expo 2025; Minister in charge of Digital Garden City Nation Vision; Minister in charge of Cohesive Society; Minister in charge of Overcoming Population Decline and Vitalizing Local Economy; Minister of State for Consumer Affairs and Food Safety; Minister of State for "Cool Japan" Strategy; Minister of State for the Intellectual Property Strategy		Kenji Wakamiya	R	4 October 2021 – 10 August 2022	
Minister for the Tokyo Olympic and Paralympic Games; Minister in charge of Promoting Vaccinations		Noriko Horiuchi	R	4 October 2021 – 31 March 2022	

=== First reshuffled cabinet ===
Second Kishida Cabinet (First Reshuffle)
- 101st Cabinet of Japan

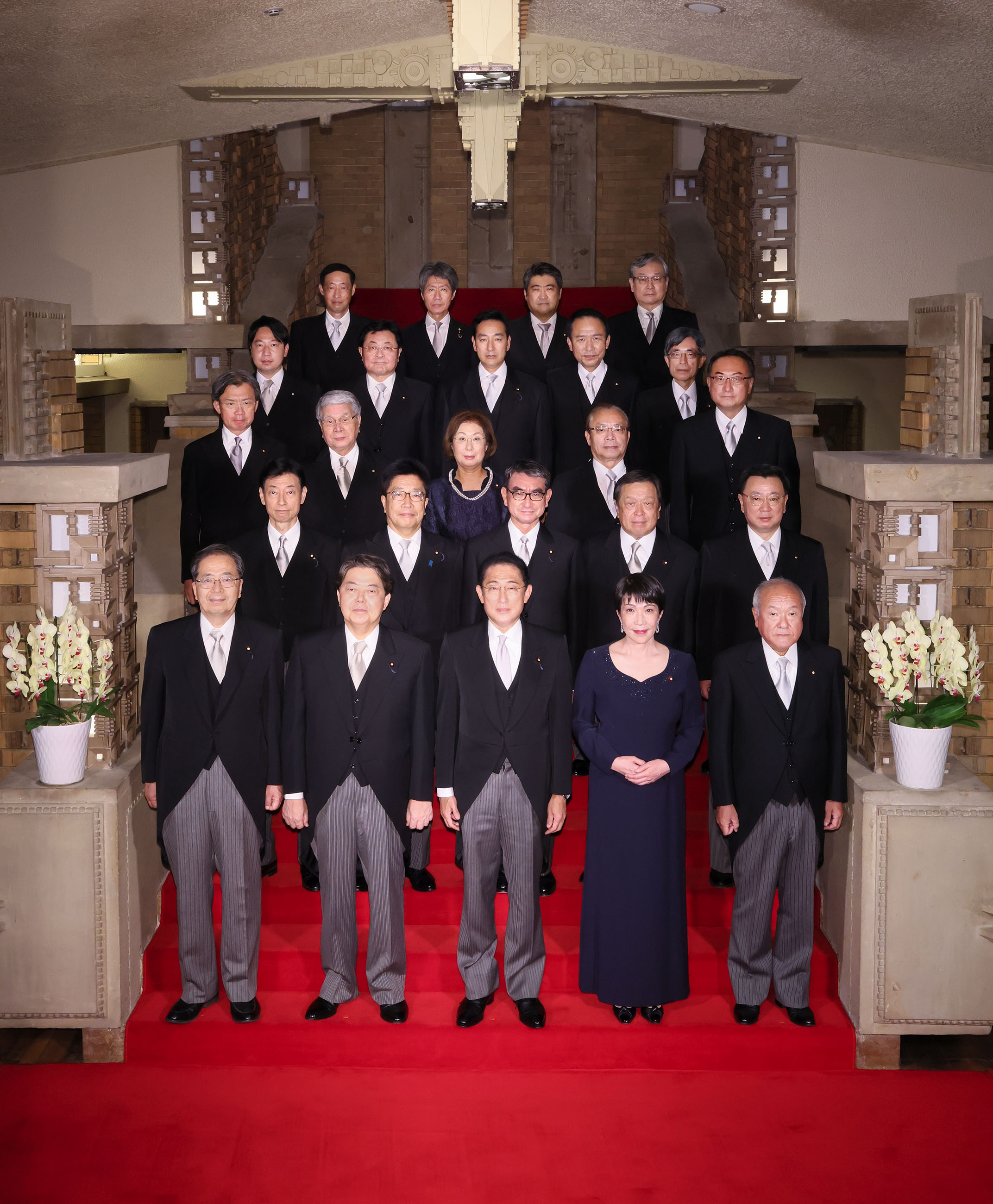
- Prime Minister Fumio Kishida (front row, centre) with his reshuffled cabinet inside the Kantei, August 10, 2022
- Date formed: August 10, 2022
- Date dissolved: September 13, 2023

People and organisations
- Emperor: Naruhito
- Prime Minister: Fumio Kishida
- Prime Minister's history: Member of the HoR for Hiroshima 1st district (1993–present); Former Foreign Minister (2012–2017); Former acting Minister of Defense (2017)
- No. of ministers: 20 (2022); 21 (2021–2022)
- Member party: Liberal Democratic Party; Komeito
- Status in legislature: Coalition government HoR (Lower): Majority; HoC (Upper): Majority
- Opposition cabinet: Izumi Next Cabinet (2022–2024); Noda Next Cabinet (2024-)
- Opposition party: Constitutional Democratic Party; Democratic Party For the People; Japan Innovation Party; Japanese Communist Party; Reiwa Shinsengumi; Social Democratic Party
- Opposition leader: Kenta Izumi (2021–2024); Yoshihiko Noda (2024–present)

History
- Elections: 2021/49th HoR general election 2022/26th HoC regular election
- Legislature terms: 206th– National Diet (49th HoR, 25th– HoC)
- Predecessor: Second Kishida Cabinet
- Successor: Second Kishida Cabinet (Second Reshuffle)

Second Kishida Cabinet from August 10, 2022 to September 13, 2023
Portfolio	Image	Minister		Term	Note
Prime Minister		Fumio Kishida	R	4 October 2021 – 13 September 2023	
Minister for Internal Affairs and Communications		Minoru Terada	R	10 August 2022 – 20 November 2022	
Minister for Internal Affairs and Communications		Takeaki Matsumoto	R	21 November 2022 – 13 September 2023	
Minister of Justice		Yasuhiro Hanashi	R	10 August 2022 – 11 November 2022	
Minister of Justice		Ken Saitō	R	11 November 2022 – 13 September 2023	
Minister for Foreign Affairs		Yoshimasa Hayashi	R	10 November 2021 – 13 September 2023	
Minister of Finance; Minister of State for Financial Services; Minister in charge of Overcoming Deflation		Shun'ichi Suzuki	R	4 October 2021 – 13 September 2023	
Minister of Education, Culture, Sports, Science and Technology; Minister in charge of Education Rebuilding		Keiko Nagaoka	R	10 August 2022 – 13 September 2023	
Minister of Health, Labour and Welfare		Katsunobu Kato	R	10 August 2022 – 13 September 2023	
Minister of Agriculture, Forestry and Fisheries		Tetsuro Nomura	C	10 August 2022 – 13 September 2023	
Minister of Economy, Trade and Industry; Minister in charge of Industrial Competitiveness; Minister for Economic Cooperation with Russia; Minister in charge of the Response to the Economic Impact caused by the Nuclear Accident; Minister of State for the Nuclear Damage Compensation and Decommissioning Facilitation Corporation		Yasutoshi Nishimura	R	10 August 2022 – 13 September 2023	
Minister of Land, Infrastructure, Transport and Tourism; Minister in charge of Water Cycle Policy; Minister for the World Horticultural Exhibition Yokohama 2027		Tetsuo Saito	R	4 October 2021 – 13 September 2023	
Minister of the Environment; Minister of State for Nuclear Emergency Preparedness		Akihiro Nishimura	R	10 August 2022 – 13 September 2023	
Minister of Defense		Yasukazu Hamada	R	10 August 2022 – 13 September 2023	
Chief Cabinet Secretary; Minister in charge of Mitigating the Impact of U.S. Forces in Okinawa; Minister in charge of the Abductions Issue; Minister in Charge of Promoting Vaccinations		Hirokazu Matsuno	R	4 October 2021 – 13 September 2023	
Minister for Digital Transformation; Minister of State for Digital Reform; Minister of State for Consumer Affairs and Food Safety; Minister in charge of Civil Service Reform		Taro Kono	R	10 August 2022 – 13 September 2023	
Minister of Reconstruction; Minister in charge of Comprehensive Policy Coordination for Revival from the Nuclear Accident at Fukushima		Kenya Akiba	R	10 August 2022 – 27 December 2022	
Minister of Reconstruction; Minister in charge of Comprehensive Policy Coordination for Revival from the Nuclear Accident at Fukushima		Hiromichi Watanabe	R	27 December 2022 – 13 September 2023	
Chairman of the National Public Safety Commission; Minister in charge of Building National Resilience; Minister in charge of Territorial Issues; Minister in charge of Civil Service Reform; Minister of State for Disaster Management and Ocean Policy		Koichi Tani	R	10 August 2022 – 13 September 2023	
Minister in charge of Policies Related to Children; Minister in charge of Cohesive Society; Minister in charge of Women's Empowerment; Minister in charge of Measures for Loneliness and Isolation; Minister of State for Measures for Declining Birthrate; Minister of State for Gender Equality		Masanobu Ogura	R	10 August 2022 – 13 September 2023	
Minister of State for Economic and Fiscal Policy; Minister in charge of Economic Revitalization; Minister in charge of New Capitalism; Minister in charge of Startups; Minister in charge of Measures for Novel Coronavirus Disease and Health Crisis Management; Minister in charge of Social Security Reform		Daishiro Yamagiwa	R	10 August 2022 – 25 October 2022	
Minister of State for Economic and Fiscal Policy; Minister in charge of Economic Revitalization; Minister in charge of New Capitalism; Minister in charge of Startups; Minister in charge of Measures for Novel Coronavirus Disease and Health Crisis Management; Minister in charge of Social Security Reform		Shigeyuki Goto	R	25 October 2022 – 13 September 2023	
Minister in charge of Economic Security; Minister of State for Intellectual Property Strategy; Minister of State for Science and Technology Policy; Minister of State for Space Policy; Minister of State for Economic Security		Sanae Takaichi	R	10 August 2022 – 13 September 2023	
Minister of State for Okinawa and Northern Territories Affairs; Minister of State for Regional Revitalization; Minister of State for Regulatory Reform; Minister of State for "Cool Japan" Strategy; Minister of State for Ainu-Related Policies; Minister in charge of Digital Garden City Nation Vision; Minister for the World Expo 2025; Minister in charge of Administrative Reform		Naoki Okada	C	10 August 2022 – 13 September 2023	

=== Second reshuffled cabinet ===
Second Kishida Cabinet (Second Reshuffle)
- 101st Cabinet of Japan

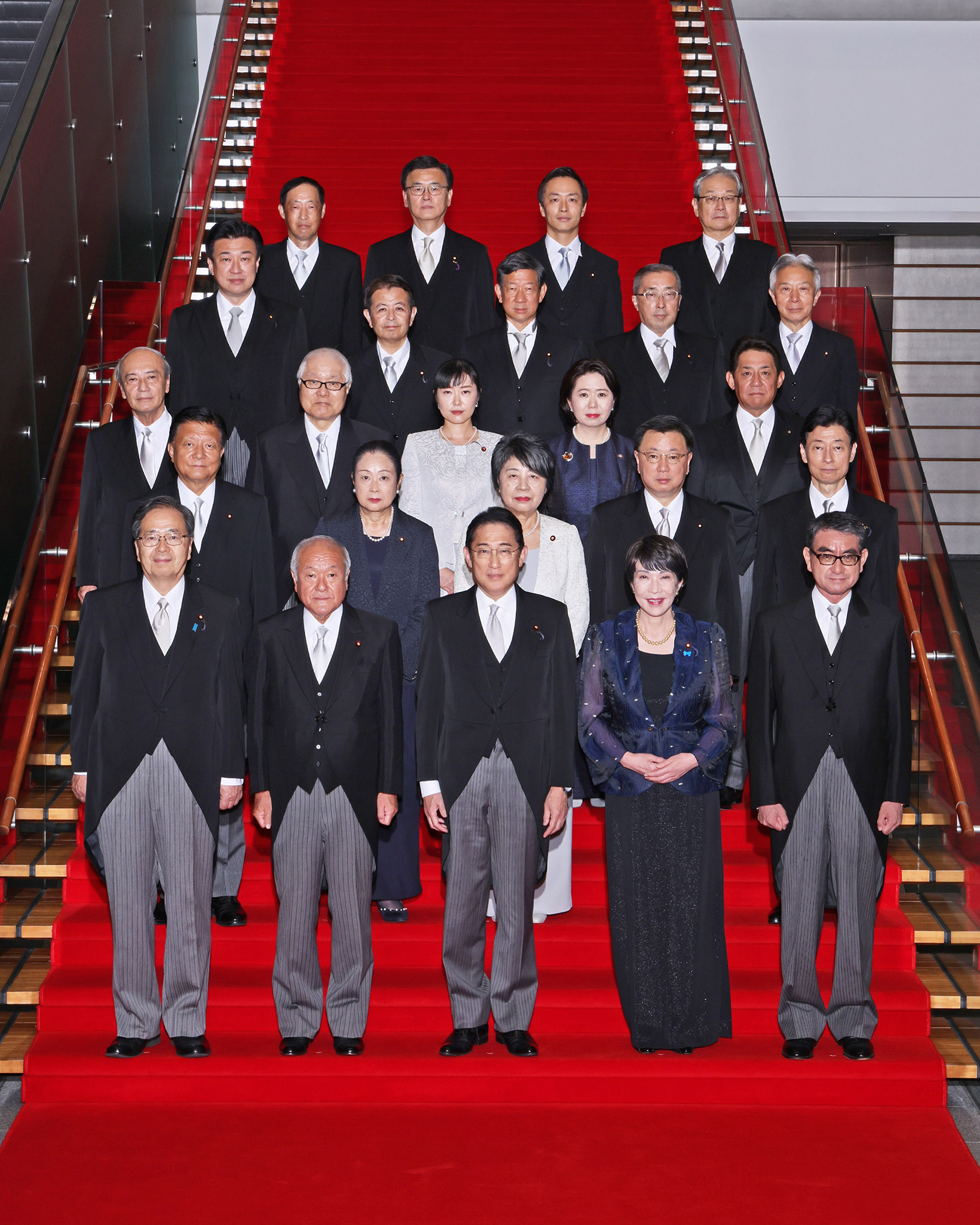
- Prime Minister Fumio Kishida (front row, centre) with his reshuffled cabinet inside the Kantei, September 13, 2023
- Date formed: September 13, 2023
- Date dissolved: October 1, 2024

People and organisations
- Emperor: Naruhito
- Prime Minister: Fumio Kishida
- Prime Minister's history: Member of the HoR for Hiroshima 1st district (1993–present); Former Foreign Minister (2012–2017); Former acting Minister of Defense (2017)
- No. of ministers: 20 (2022); 21 (2021–2022)
- Member party: Liberal Democratic Party; Komeito
- Status in legislature: HoR (Lower): LDP-K Coalition majority 293 / 465 (63%) HoC (Upper): LDP-K Coalition majority 142 / 245 (58%)
- Opposition cabinet: Izumi Next Cabinet (2022–2024); Noda Next Cabinet (2024-)
- Opposition party: Constitutional Democratic Party; Democratic Party For the People; Japan Innovation Party; Japanese Communist Party; Reiwa Shinsengumi; Social Democratic Party
- Opposition leader: Kenta Izumi (2021–2024); Yoshihiko Noda (2024–present)

History
- Elections: 2021/49th HoR general election 2022/26th HoC regular election
- Legislature terms: 206th– National Diet (49th HoR, 25th– HoC)
- Predecessor: Second Kishida Cabinet (First Reshuffle)
- Successor: First Ishiba Cabinet

Second Kishida Cabinet from September 13, 2023 to October 1, 2024
Portfolio	Image	Minister		Term	Note
Cabinet ministers
Prime Minister		Fumio Kishida	R	4 October 2021 – 1 October 2024	
Minister for Internal Affairs and Communications		Junji Suzuki	R	13 September 2023 – 14 December 2023	First cabinet appointment
Minister for Internal Affairs and Communications		Takeaki Matsumoto	R	14 December 2023 – 1 October 2024	
Minister of Justice		Ryuji Koizumi	R	13 September 2023 – 1 October 2024	First cabinet appointment
Minister for Foreign Affairs		Yoko Kamikawa	R	13 September 2023 – 1 October 2024	
Minister of Finance; Minister of State for Financial Services; Minister in charge of Overcoming Deflation		Shun'ichi Suzuki	R	4 October 2021 – 1 October 2024	
Minister of Education, Culture, Sports, Science and Technology		Masahito Moriyama	R	13 September 2023 – 1 October 2024	First cabinet appointment
Minister of Health, Labour and Welfare		Keizo Takemi	C	13 September 2023 – 1 October 2024	First cabinet appointment
Minister of Agriculture, Forestry and Fisheries		Ichiro Miyashita	R	13 September 2023 – 14 December 2023	First cabinet appointment
Minister of Agriculture, Forestry and Fisheries		Tetsushi Sakamoto	R	14 December 2023 – 1 October 2024	
Minister of Economy, Trade and Industry; Minister in charge of the Response to the Economic Impact caused by the Nuclear Accident; Minister for Green Transformation; Minister in charge of Industrial Competitiveness; Minister for Economic Cooperation with Russia; Minister of State for the Nuclear Damage Compensation and Decommissioning Facilitation Corporation		Yasutoshi Nishimura	R	10 August 2022 – 14 December 2023	
Minister of Economy, Trade and Industry; Minister in charge of the Response to the Economic Impact caused by the Nuclear Accident; Minister for Green Transformation; Minister in charge of Industrial Competitiveness; Minister for Economic Cooperation with Russia; Minister of State for the Nuclear Damage Compensation and Decommissioning Facilitation Corporation		Ken Saitō	R	14 December 2023 – 1 October 2024	
Minister of Land, Infrastructure, Transport and Tourism; Minister in charge of Water Cycle Policy; Minister for the World Horticultural Exhibition Yokohama 2027		Tetsuo Saito	R	4 October 2021 – 1 October 2024	
Minister of the Environment; Minister of State for Nuclear Emergency Preparedness		Shintaro Ito	R	13 September 2023 – 1 October 2024	First cabinet appointment
Minister of Defense		Minoru Kihara	R	13 September 2023 – 1 October 2024	First cabinet appointment
Chief Cabinet Secretary; Minister in charge of Mitigating the Impact of U.S. Forces in Okinawa; Minister in charge of the Abductions Issue		Hirokazu Matsuno	R	4 October 2021 – 14 December 2023	
Chief Cabinet Secretary; Minister in charge of Mitigating the Impact of U.S. Forces in Okinawa; Minister in charge of the Abductions Issue		Yoshimasa Hayashi	R	14 December 2023 – 1 October 2024	
Minister for Digital Transformation; Minister in charge of Digital Administrative and Fiscal Reforms; Minister in charge of Digital Garden City Nation Vision; Minister in charge of Administrative Reform; Minister in charge of Civil Service Reform; Minister of State for Regulatory Reform		Taro Kono	R	10 August 2022 – 1 October 2024	
Minister of Reconstruction; Minister in charge of Comprehensive Policy Coordination for Revival from the Nuclear Accident at Fukushima		Shinako Tsuchiya	R	13 September 2023 – 1 October 2024	First cabinet appointment
Chairman of the National Public Safety Commission; Minister in charge of Building National Resilience; Minister in charge of Territorial Issues; Minister of State for Disaster Management and Ocean Policy		Yoshifumi Matsumura	C	13 September 2023 – 1 October 2024	First cabinet appointment
Minister of State for Policies Related to Children; Minister of State for Measures for Declining Birthrate; Minister of State for Youth's Empowerment; Minister of State for Gender Equality; Minister in charge of Women's Empowerment; Minister in charge of Cohesive Society; Minister in charge of Measures for Loneliness and Isolation		Ayuko Kato	R	13 September 2023 – 1 October 2024	First cabinet appointment
Minister in charge of Economic Revitalization; Minister in charge of New Capitalism; Minister in charge of Startups; Minister in charge of Infectious Disease Crisis Management; Minister in charge of Social Security Reform; Minister of State for Economic and Fiscal Policy		Yoshitaka Shindo	R	13 September 2023 – 1 October 2024	
Minister in charge of Economic Security; Minister of State for "Cool Japan" Strategy; Minister of State for Intellectual Property Strategy; Minister of State for Science and Technology Policy; Minister of State for Space Policy; Minister of State for Economic Security		Sanae Takaichi	R	10 August 2022 – 1 October 2024	
Minister of State for Okinawa and Northern Territories Affairs; Minister for Consumer Affairs and Food Safety; Minister of State for Regional Revitalization; Minister of State for Ainu-Related Policies; Minister for the World Expo 2025		Hanako Jimi	C	13 September 2023 – 1 October 2024	First cabinet appointment

Preceded by First Kishida cabinet	Cabinet of Japan; 2021–2024	Succeeded by First Ishiba cabinet
