= First Kishida cabinet =

100th Cabinet of Japan (2021)

- 100th Cabinet of Japan
- 4 October – 10 November 2021
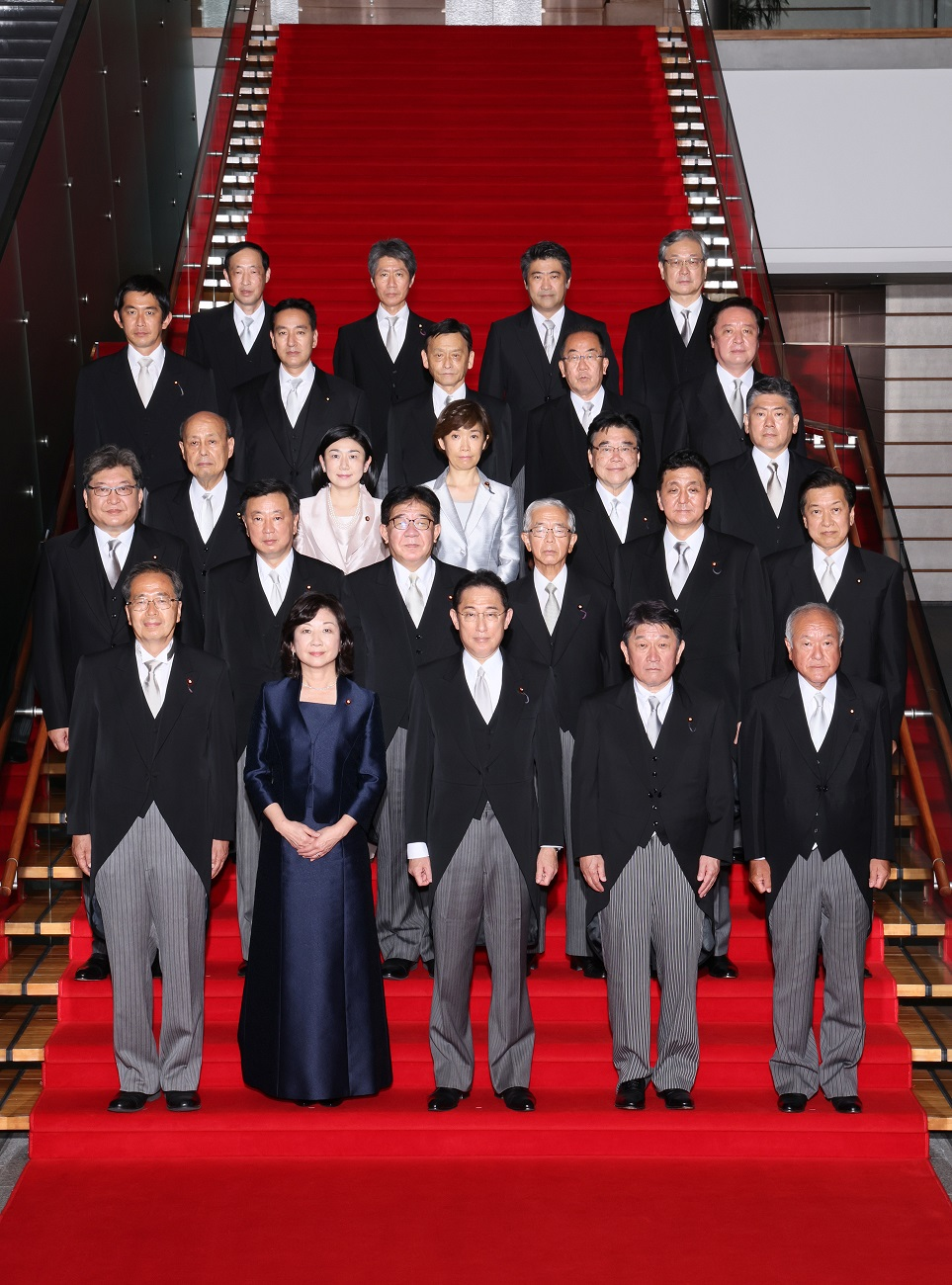
- Prime Minister Fumio Kishida (front row, centre) with the newly-elected cabinet inside the Kantei, October 4, 2021
- Date formed: October 4, 2021
- Date dissolved: November 10, 2021

People and organisations
- Emperor: Naruhito
- Head of government: Fumio Kishida
- Head of government's history: Member of the HoR for Hiroshima 1st district (1993–present); Former Foreign Minister (2012–2017); Former acting Minister of Defense (2017)
- No. of ministers: 20
- Total no. of members: 21
- Member party: Liberal Democratic Party; Komeito
- Status in legislature: Coalition government HoR (Lower): Supermajority; HoC (Upper): Majority
- Opposition party: Constitutional Democratic Party
- Opposition leader: Yukio Edano

History
- Predecessor: Suga
- Successor: Kishida II

The First Kishida cabinet was the 100th Cabinet of Japan. Formed by Fumio Kishida on October 4, 2021, it had 21 members, including three women. Two ministers, Foreign Minister Toshimitsu Motegi and Defense Minister Nobuo Kishi, retained their posts from the previous cabinet. The government is a coalition between the Liberal Democratic Party and the Komeito who controlled both the upper and lower houses of the National Diet.

After just 37 days it was replaced by the Second Kishida cabinet following the 2021 election, making it the shortest-serving cabinet in Japanese history.

== Election of the prime minister ==
October 4, 2021 Absolute majority (233/465) required
House of Representatives
Choice	First Vote
Choice	Votes
Fumio Kishida	311 / 465
Yukio Edano	124 / 465
Toranosuke Katayama	11 / 465
Yuichiro Tamaki	11 / 465
Sanae Takaichi	1 / 465
Abstentions	2 / 465
Vacant	5 / 465

October 4, 2021 Absolute majority (123/245) required
House of Councillors
Choice	First Vote
Choice	Votes
Fumio Kishida	141 / 245
Yukio Edano	65 / 245
Toranosuke Katayama	15 / 245
Yuichiro Tamaki	15 / 245
Yukiko Kada	2 / 245
Yoshimi Watanabe	2 / 245
Takae Itō	1 / 245
Abstentions	1 / 245
Vacant	3 / 245

== List of ministers ==
Liberal Democratic

Komeito

R = Member of the House of Representatives

C = Member of the House of Councillors

B = Bureaucrat

=== Cabinet ===
Citation of this table: List of First Kishida Cabinet Members

First Kishida Cabinet
Portfolio	Minister		Term	Note
Prime Minister	Fumio Kishida	R	October 4, 2021 – November 10, 2021	
Minister for Internal Affairs and Communications	Yasushi Kaneko	R	October 4, 2021 – November 10, 2021	
Minister of Justice	Yoshihisa Furukawa	R	October 4, 2021 – November 10, 2021	
Minister for Foreign Affairs	Toshimitsu Motegi	R	September 11, 2019 – November 4, 2021	
Minister for Foreign Affairs	Fumio Kishida	R	November 4, 2021 – November 10, 2021	
Minister of Finance; Minister of State for Financial Services; Minister in charge of Overcoming Deflation	Shun'ichi Suzuki	R	October 4, 2021 – November 10, 2021	
Minister of Education, Culture, Sports, Science and Technology; Minister in charge of Education Rebuilding	Shinsuke Suematsu	C	October 4, 2021 – November 10, 2021	
Minister of Health, Labour and Welfare	Shigeyuki Goto	R	October 4, 2021 – November 10, 2021	
Minister of Agriculture, Forestry and Fisheries	Genjiro Kaneko	C	October 4, 2021 – November 10, 2021	
Minister of Economy, Trade and Industry; Minister in charge of Industrial Competitiveness; Minister for Economic Cooperation with Russia; Minister in charge of the Response to the Economic Impact caused by the Nuclear Accident; Minister of State for the Nuclear Damage Compensation and Decommissioning Facilitation Corporation	Koichi Hagiuda	R	October 4, 2021 – November 10, 2021	
Minister of Land, Infrastructure, Transport and Tourism; Minister in charge of Water Cycle Policy	Tetsuo Saito	R	October 4, 2021 – November 10, 2021	
Minister of the Environment; Minister of State for Nuclear Emergency Preparedness	Tsuyoshi Yamaguchi	R	October 4, 2021 – November 10, 2021	
Minister of Defense	Nobuo Kishi	R	September 16, 2020 – November 10, 2021	
Chief Cabinet Secretary; Minister in charge of Mitigating the Impact of U.S. Forces in Okinawa; Minister in charge of the Abductions Issue	Hirokazu Matsuno	R	October 4, 2021 – November 10, 2021	
Minister for Digital; Minister in charge of Administrative Reform; Minister of State for Regulatory Reform	Karen Makishima	R	October 4, 2021 – November 10, 2021	
Minister of Reconstruction; Minister in charge of Comprehensive Policy Coordination for Revival from the Nuclear Accident at Fukushima; Minister of State for Okinawa and Northern Territories Affairs	Kosaburo Nishime	R	October 4, 2021 – November 10, 2021	
Chairman of the National Public Safety Commission; Minister in charge of Building National Resilience; Minister in charge of Territorial Issues; Minister in charge of Civil Service Reform; Minister of State for Disaster Management and Ocean Policy	Satoshi Ninoyu	R	October 4, 2021 – November 10, 2021	
Minister of State for Regional Revitalization; Minister of State for Measures for Declining Birthrate; Minister of State for Gender Equality; Minister in charge of Women's Empowerment; Minister in Charge of Policies Related to Children; Minister in Charge of Measures for Loneliness and Isolation	Seiko Noda	R	October 4, 2021 – November 10, 2021	
Minister in charge of Economic Revitalization; Minister in charge of New Capitalism; Minister in charge of Measures for Novel Coronavirus Disease and Health Crisis Management; Minister in charge of Social Security Reform; Minister of State for Economic and Fiscal Policy	Daishiro Yamagiwa	R	October 4, 2021 – November 10, 2021	
Minister in charge of Economic Security; Minister of State for Science and Technology Policy; Minister of State for Space Policy	Takayuki Kobayashi	R	October 4, 2021 – November 10, 2021	
Minister of State for the Tokyo Olympic and Paralympic Games; Minister in Charge of Promoting Vaccinations	Noriko Horiuchi	R	October 4, 2021 – November 10, 2021	
Minister for the World Expo 2025; Minister in Charge of Cohesive Society; Minister in Charge of Overcoming Population Decline and Vitalizing Local Economy; Minister of State for Consumer Affairs and Food Safety; Minister of State for "Cool Japan" Strategy; Minister of State for the Intellectual Property Strategy	Kenji Wakamiya	R	October 4, 2021 – November 10, 2021	

=== Deputy Chief Cabinet Secretary and Director-General of the Cabinet Legislation Bureau ===
First Kishida Deputy Cabinet
Portfolio	Deputy Minister		Term	Note
Deputy Chief Cabinet Secretary	Seiji Kihara	R	October 4, 2021 – November 10, 2021	
Deputy Chief Cabinet Secretary	Yoshihiko Isozaki	C	October 4, 2021 – November 10, 2021	
Deputy Chief Cabinet Secretary	Shun'ichi Kuryu	B	October 4, 2021 – November 10, 2021	former: National Police Agency
Director-General of the Cabinet Legislation Bureau	Masaharu Kondo	B	September 11, 2019 – November 10, 2021	former: the Ministry of Economy, Trade and Industry

=== Special Adviser to the Prime Minister ===
Office of the Prime Minister
Portfolio	Adviser		Term	Note
Special Adviser to the Prime Minister for National Security	Seiji Kihara	R	October 4, 2021 – November 10, 2021	also served as the Deputy Chief Cabinet Secretary
Special Adviser to the Prime Minister for Domestic Economic and other special issues	Hideki Murai	R	October 8, 2021 – November 10, 2021	

=== State ministers ===
State ministers
Portfolio	State Minister		Term	Note
State Minister of Digital Agency	Fumiaki Kobayashi	R	October 6, 2021 – November 11, 2021	also served as the State Minister of Cabinet Office
State Minister for Reconstruction	Hiroyuki Togashi	R	October 6, 2021 – November 11, 2021	
State Minister for Reconstruction	Shin'ichi Yokoyama	C	September 13, 2019 – November 11, 2021	
State Minister for Reconstruction	Takeyuki Watanabe	C	April 30, 2021 – November 11, 2021	also served as the State Minister of Cabinet Office and the State Minister of Land, Infrastructure, Transport and Tourism
State Minister of Cabinet Office	Fumiaki Kobayashi	R	October 6, 2021 – November 11, 2021	also served as the State Minister of Digital Agency
State Minister of Cabinet Office	Keitaro Ohno	R	October 6, 2021 – November 11, 2021	
State Minister of Cabinet Office	Hitoshi Kikawada	R	October 6, 2021 – November 11, 2021	
State Minister of Cabinet Office	Masaaki Akaike	C	October 6, 2021 – November 11, 2021	
State Minister of Cabinet Office	Yoshitaka Ikeda	R	October 6, 2021 – November 11, 2021	also served as the State Minister of Education, Culture, Sports, Science and Technology
State Minister of Cabinet Office	Ken'ichi Hosoda	R	October 6, 2021 – November 11, 2021	also served as the State Minister of Economy, Trade and Industry
State Minister of Cabinet Office	Masahiro Ishii	C	October 6, 2021 – November 11, 2021	also served as the State Minister of Economy, Trade and Industry
State Minister of Cabinet Office	Shunsuke Mutai	R	October 6, 2021 – November 11, 2021	also served as the State Minister of Environment
State Minister of Cabinet Office	Makoto Oniki	R	October 6, 2021 – November 11, 2021	also served as the State Minister of Defense
State Minister of Cabinet Office	Hiroshi Yamamoto	C	January 22, 2021 – November 11, 2021	also served as the State Minister of Health, Labour and Welfare
State Minister of Cabinet Office	Takeyuki Watanabe	C	April 30, 2021 – November 11, 2021	also served as the State Minister for Reconstruction and the State Minister of Land, Infrastructure, Transport and Tourism
State Minister for Internal Affairs and Communications	Hiroaki Tabata	R	October 6, 2021 – November 11, 2021	
State Minister for Internal Affairs and Communications	Yusuke Nakanishi	C	October 6, 2021 – November 11, 2021	
State Minister of Justice	Jun Tsushima	R	October 6, 2021 – November 11, 2021	
State Minister for Foreign Affairs	Kiyoshi Odawara	R	October 6, 2021 – November 11, 2021	
State Minister for Foreign Affairs	Takako Suzuki	R	October 6, 2021 – November 11, 2021	
State Minister of Finance	Wataru Ito	R	September 18, 2020 – November 11, 2021	
State Minister of Finance	Satoshi Ohie	C	October 6, 2021 – November 11, 2021	
State Minister of Education, Culture, Sports, Science and Technology	Hideyuki Tanaka	R	October 6, 2021 – November 11, 2021	
State Minister of Education, Culture, Sports, Science and Technology	Yoshitaka Ikeda	R	October 6, 2021 – November 11, 2021	also served as the State Minister of Cabinet Office
State Minister of Health, Labour and Welfare	Atsushi Koga	R	October 6, 2021 – November 11, 2021	
State Minister of Health, Labour and Welfare	Hiroshi Yamamoto	C	September 18, 2020 – November 11, 2021	also served as the State Minister of Cabinet Office
State Minister of Agriculture, Forestry and Fisheries	Arata Takebe	R	October 6, 2021 – November 11, 2021	
State Minister of Agriculture, Forestry and Fisheries	Hiroyuki Nakamura	R	October 6, 2021 – November 11, 2021	
State Minister of Economy, Trade and Industry	Ken'ichi Hosoda	R	October 6, 2021 – November 11, 2021	also served as the State Minister of Cabinet Office
State Minister of Economy, Trade and Industry	Masahiro Ishii	C	October 6, 2021 – November 11, 2021	also served as the State Minister of Cabinet Office
State Minister of Land, Infrastructure, Transport and Tourism	Norihiro Nakayama	R	October 6, 2021 – November 11, 2021	
State Minister of Land, Infrastructure, Transport and Tourism	Takeyuki Watanabe	C	April 30, 2021 – November 11, 2021	also served as the State Minister for Reconstruction and the State Minister of Cabinet Office
State Minister of Environment	Toshitaka Ohtaka	R	October 6, 2021 – November 11, 2021	
State Minister of Environment	Shunsuke Mutai	R	October 6, 2021 – November 11, 2021	also served as the State Minister of Cabinet Office
State Minister of Defense	Makoto Oniki	R	October 6, 2021 – November 11, 2021	also served as the State Minister of Cabinet Office

=== Parliamentary vice-ministers ===
Parliamentary vice-ministers
Portfolio	Parliamentary Vice-Minister		Term	Note
Parliamentary Vice-Minister of Digital Agency	Taro Yamada	C	October 6, 2021 – November 11, 2021	also served as the Parliamentary Vice-Minister of Cabinet Office
Parliamentary Vice-Minister for Reconstruction	Kohichi Munekiyo	R	October 6, 2021 – November 11, 2021	also served as the Parliamentary Vice-Minister of Cabinet Office
Parliamentary Vice-Minister for Reconstruction	Harumi Takahashi	C	October 6, 2021 – November 11, 2021	also served as the Parliamentary Vice-Minister of Cabinet Office and the Parliamentary Vice-Minister of Education, Culture, Sports, Science and Technology
Parliamentary Vice-Minister for Reconstruction	Kazuchika Iwata	R	October 6, 2021 – November 11, 2021	also served as the Parliamentary Vice-Minister of Cabinet Office and the Parliamentary Vice-Minister of Economy, Trade and Industry
Parliamentary Vice-Minister for Reconstruction	Hirohiko Izumida	R	October 6, 2021 – November 11, 2021	also served as the Parliamentary Vice-Minister of Cabinet Office and the Parliamentary Vice-Minister of Land, Infrastructure, Transport and Tourism
Parliamentary Vice-Minister of Cabinet Office	Taro Yamada	C	October 6, 2021 – November 11, 2021	also served as the Parliamentary Vice-Minister of Digital Agency
Parliamentary Vice-Minister of Cabinet Office	Tetsuya Kimura	R	October 6, 2021 – November 11, 2021	
Parliamentary Vice-Minister of Cabinet Office	Hiroo Kotera	R	October 6, 2021 – November 11, 2021	
Parliamentary Vice-Minister of Cabinet Office	Dai Shimamura	C	October 6, 2021 – November 11, 2021	also served as the Parliamentary Vice-Minister of Health, Labour and Welfare
Parliamentary Vice-Minister of Cabinet Office	Yuhmi Yoshikawa	C	October 6, 2021 – November 11, 2021	also served as the Parliamentary Vice-Minister of Economy, Trade and Industry
Parliamentary Vice-Minister of Cabinet Office	Yasushi Hosaka	R	October 6, 2021 – November 11, 2021	also served as the Parliamentary Vice-Minister of Environment
Parliamentary Vice-Minister of Cabinet Office	Hiroyuki Ohnishi	R	October 6, 2021 – November 11, 2021	also served as the Parliamentary Vice-Minister of Defense
Parliamentary Vice-Minister of Cabinet Office	Kohichi Munekiyo	R	October 6, 2021 – November 11, 2021	also served as the Parliamentary Vice-Minister of Cabinet Office
Parliamentary Vice-Minister of Cabinet Office	Hirohiko Izumida	R	October 6, 2021 – November 11, 2021	also served as the Parliamentary Vice-Minister of Cabinet Office and the Parliamentary Vice-Minister of Land, Infrastructure, Transport and Tourism
Parliamentary Vice-Minister of Cabinet Office	Harumi Takahashi	C	October 6, 2021 – November 11, 2021	also served as the Parliamentary Vice-Minister of Cabinet Office and the Parliamentary Vice-Minister of Education, Culture, Sports, Science and Technology
Parliamentary Vice-Minister of Cabinet Office	Kazuchika Iwata	R	October 6, 2021 – November 11, 2021	also served as the Parliamentary Vice-Minister of Cabinet Office and the Parliamentary Vice-Minister of Economy, Trade and Industry
Parliamentary Vice-Minister for Internal Affairs and Communications	Jiro Hatoyama	R	October 6, 2021 – November 11, 2021	
Parliamentary Vice-Minister for Internal Affairs and Communications	Kohichi Watanabe	R	October 6, 2021 – November 11, 2021	
Parliamentary Vice-Minister for Internal Affairs and Communications	Yasushi Miura	C	October 6, 2021 – November 11, 2021	
Parliamentary Vice-Minister of Justice	Hiroyuki Kada	C	October 6, 2021 – November 11, 2021	
Parliamentary Vice-Minister for Foreign Affairs	Kentaro Uesugi	R	October 6, 2021 – November 11, 2021	
Parliamentary Vice-Minister for Foreign Affairs	Taro Honda	R	October 6, 2021 – November 11, 2021	
Parliamentary Vice-Minister for Foreign Affairs	Shingo Miyake	C	October 6, 2021 – November 11, 2021	
Parliamentary Vice-Minister of Finance	Masahiro Kohmura	R	October 6, 2021 – November 11, 2021	
Parliamentary Vice-Minister of Finance	Mamoru Shigemoto	R	October 6, 2021 – November 11, 2021	
Parliamentary Vice-Minister of Education, Culture, Sports, Science and Technology	Yoko Wanibuchi	R	October 6, 2021 – November 11, 2021	
Parliamentary Vice-Minister of Education, Culture, Sports, Science and Technology	Harumi Takahashi	C	October 6, 2021 – November 11, 2021	also served as the Parliamentary Vice-Minister for Reconstruction and the Parliamentary Vice-Minister of Cabinet Office
Parliamentary Vice-Minister of Health, Labour and Welfare	Kazuhide Ohkuma	R	October 6, 2021 – November 11, 2021	
Parliamentary Vice-Minister of Health, Labour and Welfare	Dai Shimamura	C	October 6, 2021 – November 11, 2021	also served as the Parliamentary Vice-Minister of Cabinet Office
Parliamentary Vice-Minister of Agriculture, Forestry and Fisheries	Seishi Kumano	C	October 6, 2021 – November 11, 2021	
Parliamentary Vice-Minister of Agriculture, Forestry and Fisheries	Masao Miyazaki	C	October 6, 2021 – November 11, 2021	
Parliamentary Vice-Minister of Economy, Trade and Industry	Yuhmi Yoshikawa	C	October 6, 2021 – November 11, 2021	also served as the Parliamentary Vice-Minister of Cabinet Office
Parliamentary Vice-Minister of Economy, Trade and Industry	Kazuchika Iwata	R	October 6, 2021 – November 11, 2021	also served as the Parliamentary Vice-Minister for Reconstruction and the Parliamentary Vice-Minister of Cabinet Office
Parliamentary Vice-Minister of Land, Infrastructure, Transport and Tourism	Ayuko Kato	R	October 6, 2021 – November 11, 2021	
Parliamentary Vice-Minister of Land, Infrastructure, Transport and Tourism	Jiro Kimura	R	October 6, 2021 – November 11, 2021	
Parliamentary Vice-Minister of Land, Infrastructure, Transport and Tourism	Hirohiko Izumida	R	October 6, 2021 – November 11, 2021	also served as the Parliamentary Vice-Minister of for Reconstruction and the Parliamentary Vice-Minister of Cabinet Office
Parliamentary Vice-Minister of Environment	Masaru Miyazaki	C	October 6, 2021 – November 11, 2021	
Parliamentary Vice-Minister of Environment	Yasushi Hosaka	R	October 6, 2021 – November 11, 2021	also served as the Parliamentary Vice-Minister of Cabinet Office
Parliamentary Vice-Minister of Defense	Tsuyohito Iwamoto	C	October 6, 2021 – November 11, 2021	
Parliamentary Vice-Minister of Defense	Hiroyuki Ohnishi	R	October 6, 2021 – November 11, 2021	also served as the Parliamentary Vice-Minister of Cabinet Office

Preceded by Suga cabinet	Cabinet of Japan; 2021	Succeeded by Second Kishida cabinet
