= December 2012 Democratic Party of Japan leadership election =

Political party election in Japan

- 25 December 2012
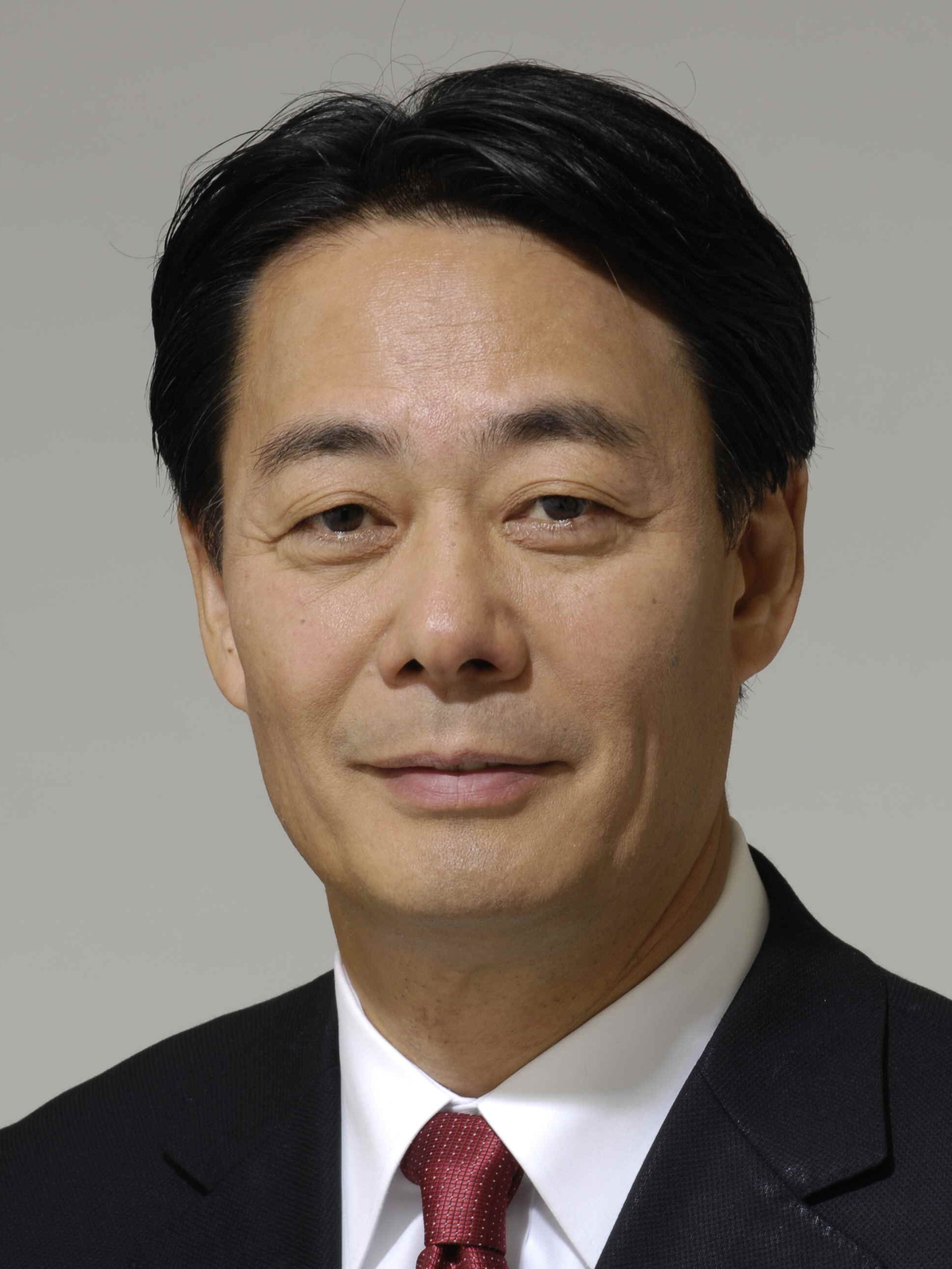

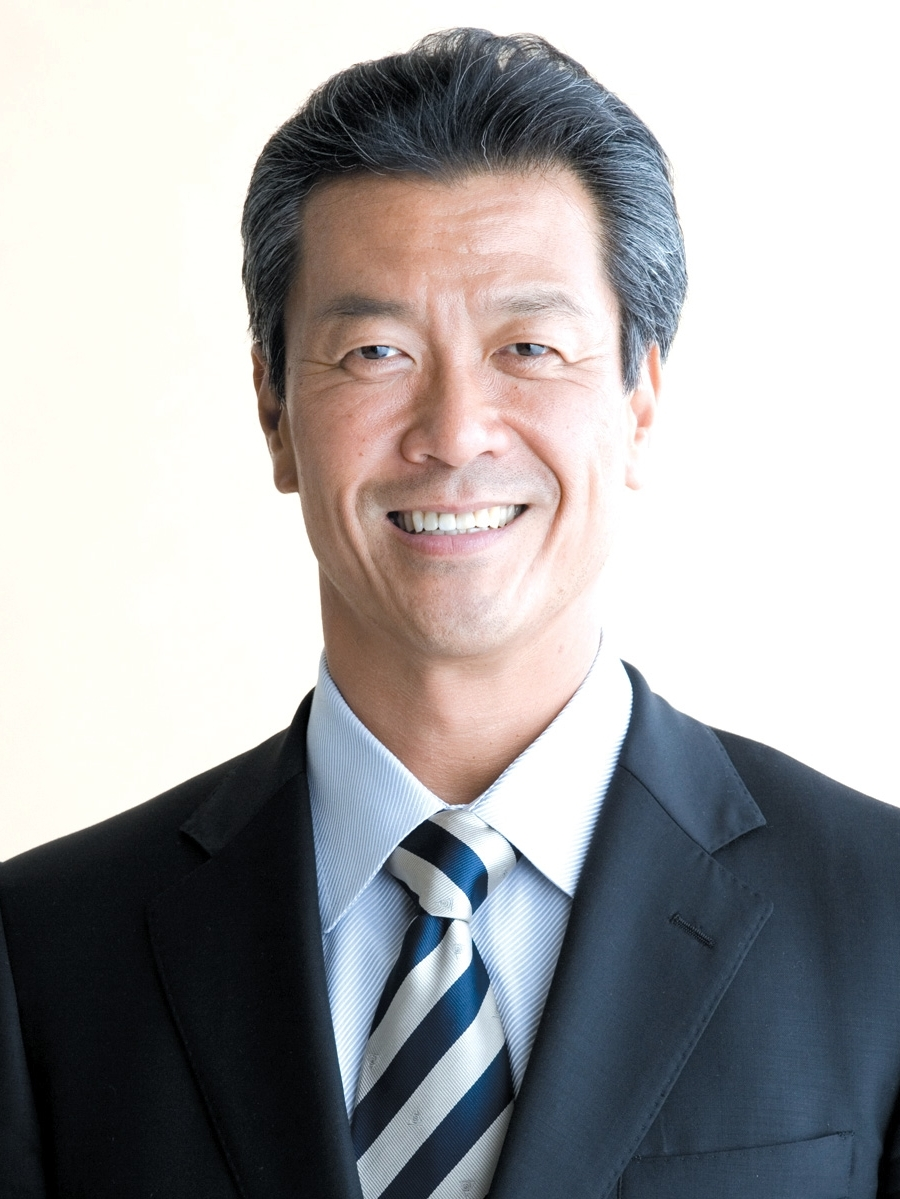
Candidate	Banri Kaieda	Sumio Mabuchi
Leader's seat	Tokyo PR	Nara 1st
Caucus vote	90	54
Percentage	62.5%	37.5%
President before election
Yoshihiko Noda
Elected President
Banri Kaieda

The December 2012 Democratic Party of Japan leadership election was held on 25 December 2012. The election was held to replace outgoing president Yoshihiko Noda, who resigned following the party's defeat in the 2012 Japanese general election. Former Minister of Economy, Trade and Industry Banri Kaieda was elected president. Kaieda had been a vocal critic of Noda during the period of government.

== Background ==
The Democratic Party had come to power for the first time in the 2009 Japanese general election. Elected in a landslide, the government struggled to implement policy, maintain unity and court public approval, cycling through three Prime Ministers and hosting four leadership elections in its three-year tenure. The party lost its majority in the upper house in 2010, and experienced a split in mid-2012 which deprived it of its lower house majority. The government was finally ousted in the December 2012 election, losing three-quarters of its seats. Eight cabinet ministers lost their seats in the defeat. Prime Minister Noda immediately announced his resignation as party president.

== Electoral system ==
The party executive met the day after the election, on 17 December, to arrange the contest. They decided to limit the vote to surviving DPJ Diet members, comprising 57 in the House of Representatives and 88 in the House of Councillors. They set the contest for the 22nd; the party intended to select a leader in time to vote for them in the upcoming Diet ballot for Prime Minister scheduled for the 26th. A number of party members criticised the short timeframe, arguing that a longer period should be taken. Takashi Shinohara pointed out that, after the 2009 election, the LDP had taken a full month to select a new leader. Satoshi Arai advocated to consult with defeated members as well as prefectural and local assembly officials before choosing new leadership. The executive reconvened on the 21st and agreed to postpone the election, though only until the 25th.

Candidates were required to gather endorsements from twenty (maximum 25) of the party's members of the National Diet in order to stand. Each Diet member was eligible to vote (145 total). If no candidate won more than 50% of votes, a runoff was to be held the same day. Nominations were taken on the 25th and the election held the same day.

== Candidates ==
Candidate	Offices held
Banri Kaieda (age 63); Tokyo	Member of the House of Representatives (1993–2005; 2009–); Minister of Economy, Trade and Industry (2011)
Sumio Mabuchi (age 52); Nara Prefecture	Member of the House of Representatives (2003–); Minister of Land, Infrastructure, Transport and Tourism (2010–11)

=== Sponsors ===
Banri Kaieda (25)	Sumio Mabuchi (21)
House of Representatives: Satoshi Arai; Kazuhiro Haraguchi; Shoichi Kondo; Yasuhiro Nakane; Akihiro Ohata; Atsushi Oshima; Takeshi Shina; Takashi Shinohara; Keisuke Tsumura; Yukio Ubukata; House of Councillors: Yukihisa Fujita; Shinkun Haku; Hajime Ishii; Mieko Kamimoto; Toshiyuki Kato; Takanori Kawai; Masao Kobayashi; Yoshiharu Komiyama; Hiroe Makiyama; Toshio Ogawa; Kusuo Oshima; Mitsuru Sakurai; Kazuya Shimba; Naoki Tanaka; Yataro Tsuda	House of Representatives: Akio Fukuda; Yuichi Goto; Makiko Kikuta; Yōsuke Kondō; Akihisa Nagashima; Soichiro Okuno; Kensuke Onishi; Kaname Tajima; Izumi Yoshida; House of Councillors: Yuji Fujimoto; Hajime Hirota; Hiroyuki Konishi; Daigo Matsuura; Masami Nishimura; Motohiro Ōno; Renhō; Hirokazu Shiba; Chiaki Takahashi; Emiko Uematsu; Satoshi Umemura; Misako Yasui

=== Declined ===
- Goshi Hosono, member of the House of Representatives (2000–) and Minister of the Environment (2011–12) – (endorsed Kaieda)
- Seiji Maehara, member of the House of Representatives (1993–), former President of the Democratic Party of Japan (2005–06) and Minister for Foreign Affairs (2010–11)
- Katsuya Okada, member of the House of Representatives (1990–), former President of the Democratic Party of Japan (2004–05), Deputy Prime Minister (2012) and Minister for Foreign Affairs (2009–10)

== Contest ==
Speculated candidates included former presidents Seiji Maehara and Katsuya Okada, former environment minister Goshi Hosono, and former infrastructure minister Sumio Mabuchi. The drastically reduced size of the caucus and loss of many party veterans made it difficult for candidates to reach the threshold of 20 nominations. The Maehara faction, the Kan faction, and ex-DSP group all lost several senior members, and the Kano faction lost both its leaders, Michihiko Kano and Shinji Tarutoko. The Hatoyama faction was effectively dissolved. As a result, many of the traditional factions opted out or were unable to field candidates. Hosono and Maehara both announced that they would not run.

Kaieda declared his candidacy on the 22nd, comparing the task of rebuilding the party to "pulling chestnuts from a fire." He was supported by the "anti-mainstream" groups that opposed Noda, including the ex-JSP group around Hirotaka Akamatsu, the ex-DSP group, and former Ozawa allies. Outgoing secretary-general Azuma Koshiishi, who was seen to exercise a decisive influence over the outcome, backed Kaieda. He was also endorsed by Goshi Hosono.

Mabuchi announced his candidacy on the 23rd. He was endorsed by Renhō and close Noda aide Yōsuke Kondō. His backing came from the remaining pro-Noda sections of the party.

== Results ==
Candidate	Votes	%
Banri Kaieda	90	62.5
Sumio Mabuchi	54	37.5
Total	144	100.0
Invalid	1	
Turnout	145	100
Eligible	145	
Source: DPJ Archive
