= Next Cabinet of Kenta Izumi =

Japanese shadow cabinet (2022–2024)

Next Cabinet of Kenta Izumi Japanese: 泉健太「次の内閣」
- De facto shadow cabinet of Japan
- 2022–2024
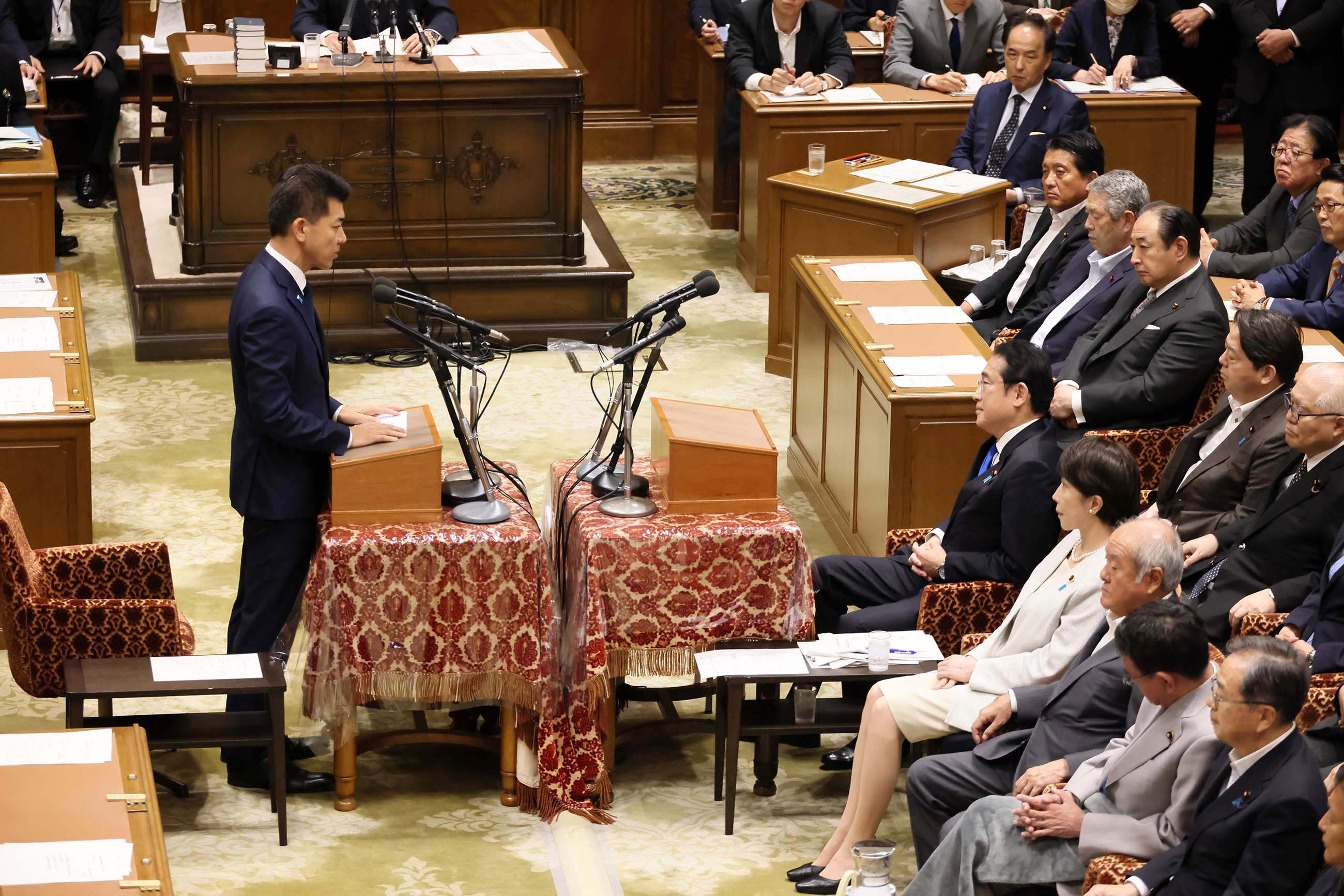
- Izumi during a session of Question Time in June 2024
- Date formed: 13 September 2022
- Date dissolved: 23 September 2024

People and organisations
- Emperor: Naruhito
- Leader of the Opposition: Kenta Izumi
- Shadow Chief Cabinet Secretary: Akira Nagatsuma
- Member party: Constitutional Democratic

History
- Election: 2021
- Outgoing election: 2024
- Legislature terms: 2021 (HoR); 2022 (HoC)
- Predecessor: Second Next Cabinet of Seiji Maehara (2017)
- Successor: Next Cabinet of Yoshihiko Noda

Kenta Izumi assumed the position of President of the Constitutional Democratic Party of Japan after being elected to the position on 30 November 2021; the election was triggered by the resignation of Yukio Edano following the party's poorer-than-expected performance during the 2021 general election. As part of his leadership, Izumi opted to revive the Next Cabinet, appointing his shadow cabinet on 13 September 2022. He later reshuffled his cabinet once on 26 January 2024.

== Shadow Cabinet ==
Key
Sits in the House of Representatives
Sits in the House of Councillors

=== January – September 2024 ===
Next Cabinet of the Constitutional Democratic Party of Japan
Portfolio	Shadow Minister	Constituency	Term
Shadow cabinet ministers
Shadow Prime Minister; President of the Constitutional Democratic Party; Leader of the Opposition	Kenta Izumi	Kyoto 3rd	Sep 2022 – Sep 2024
Shadow Chief Cabinet Secretary; CDP Political Affairs Research Chairman	Akira Nagatsuma	Tokyo 7th	Sep 2022 – Sep 2024
Shadow Minister in Charge of the Cabinet	Hideya Sugio	Nagasaki at-large	Sep 2022 – Sep 2024
Shadow Minister of Internal Affairs and Communications	Kuniyoshi Noda	Fukuoka at-large	Sep 2022 – Sep 2024
Shadow Minister of Justice	Hiroe Makiyama	Kanagawa at-large	Sep 2022 – Sep 2024
Shadow Minister for Foreign Affairs	Kōichirō Genba	Fukushima 3rd	Sep 2022 – Sep 2024
Shadow Security Minister (Note: Replacing the Minister of Defense.)	Shu Watanabe	Tokai PR	Jan 2024 – Sep 2024
Shadow Minister of Finance	Takeshi Shina	Iwate 1st	Sep 2022 – Sep 2024
Shadow Minister of Education, Culture, Sports, Science and Technology	Makiko Kikuta	Niigata 4th	Sep 2022 – Sep 2024
Shadow Minister of Health, Labour and Welfare	Mari Takagi	Saitama at-large	Jan 2024 – Sep 2024
Shadow Minister of Agriculture, Forestry and Fisheries	Emi Kaneko	Fukushima 1st	Sep 2022 – Sep 2024
Shadow Minister of Economy, Trade and Industry	Kaname Tajima	Chiba 1st	Sep 2022 – Sep 2024
Shadow Minister of Land, Infrastructure, Transport and Tourism	Yasuko Komiyama	Northern Kanto PR	Sep 2022 – Sep 2024
Shadow Minister of the Environment	Shoichi Kondo	Aichi 3rd	Sep 2022 – Sep 2024
Shadow Deputy Chief Cabinet Secretary	Kensuke Onishi	Aichi 13th	Sep 2022 – Sep 2024
Shadow Deputy Chief Cabinet Secretary	Takashi Kii	Fukuoka 10th	Sep 2022 – Sep 2024
Shadow Deputy Chief Cabinet Secretary	Eri Tokunaga	Hokkaido at-large	Jan 2024 – Sep 2024

=== September 2022 – January 2024 ===
Next Cabinet of the Constitutional Democratic Party of Japan
Portfolio	Shadow Minister	Constituency	Term
Shadow cabinet ministers
Shadow Prime Minister; President of the Constitutional Democratic Party; Leader of the Opposition	Kenta Izumi	Kyoto 3rd	Sep 2022 – Sep 2024
Shadow Chief Cabinet Secretary; CDP Political Affairs Research Chairman	Akira Nagatsuma	Tokyo 7th	Sep 2022 – Sep 2024
Shadow Minister in Charge of the Cabinet	Hideya Sugio	Nagasaki at-large	Sep 2022 – Sep 2024
Shadow Minister of Internal Affairs and Communications	Kuniyoshi Noda	Fukuoka at-large	Sep 2022 – Sep 2024
Shadow Minister of Justice	Hiroe Makiyama	Kanagawa at-large	Sep 2022 – Sep 2024
Shadow Minister for Foreign Affairs and Security	Kōichirō Genba	Fukushima 3rd	Sep 2022 – Sep 2024
Shadow Minister of Finance	Takeshi Shina	Iwate 1st	Sep 2022 – Sep 2024
Shadow Minister of Education, Culture, Sports, Science and Technology	Makiko Kikuta	Niigata 4th	Sep 2022 – Sep 2024
Shadow Minister of Health, Labour and Welfare	Yuki Waseda	Kanagawa 4th	Sep 2022 – Jan 2024
Shadow Minister of Agriculture, Forestry and Fisheries	Emi Kaneko	Fukushima 1st	Sep 2022 – Sep 2024
Shadow Minister of Economy, Trade and Industry	Kaname Tajima	Chiba 1st	Sep 2022 – Sep 2024
Shadow Minister of Land, Infrastructure, Transport and Tourism	Yasuko Komiyama	Northern Kanto PR	Sep 2022 – Sep 2024
Shadow Minister of the Environment	Shoichi Kondo	Aichi 3rd	Sep 2022 – Sep 2024
Shadow Deputy Chief Cabinet Secretary	Kensuke Onishi	Aichi 13th	Sep 2022 – Sep 2024
Shadow Deputy Chief Cabinet Secretary	Takashi Kii	Fukuoka 10th	Sep 2022 – Sep 2024
Shadow Deputy Chief Cabinet Secretary	Hiroyuki Konishi	Chiba at-large	Sep 2022 – Jan 2024
