= Noriko Horiuchi =

Japanese politician (born 1965)

- 堀内 詔子
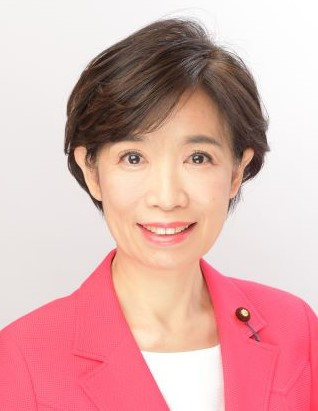
- Official portrait, 2025

Minister of State for the Tokyo Olympic and Paralympic Games
- In office 4 October 2021 – 19 September 2021
- Prime Minister: Yoshihide Suga
- Preceded by: Tamayo Marukawa
- Succeeded by: Position dissolved

Member of the House of Representatives
- Incumbent
- Assumed office 21 December 2012
- Preceded by: Multi-member district
- Constituency: Southern Kanto PR (2012–2017); Yamanashi 2nd (2017–present)

Personal details
- Born: 28 October 1965 (age 60) Isawa, Yamanashi, Japan
- Party: Liberal Democratic
- Education: Gakushuin University

Noriko Horiuchi (堀内 詔子, Horiuchi Noriko, born 28 October 1965) is a Japanese politician and member of the House of Representatives, since 2012, representing Yamanashi Prefecture. She served as Minister for the Tokyo Olympic and Paralympic Games and Minister in Charge of Promoting Vaccinations. She had been in Prime Minister Fumio Kishida's Cabinet since 4 October 2021 until 31 March 2022. Noriko Horiuchi was preceded by Tamayo Marukawa as Minister for the Tokyo Olympic and Paralympic Games and by Taro Kono as Minister in Charge of Vaccination. She is a member of the Liberal Democratic Party.

Noriko Horiuchi already performed the following roles:

- Director of Fujiyama Museum;
- Parliamentary Vice-Minister of Health, Labour and Welfare;
- Director, Committee on Health, Labour and Welfare;
- Director, Special Committee on Consumer Affairs;
- Member, Special Committee on Reconstruction after Great East Japan Earthquake;
- Deputy Director, Women's Affairs Division of Policy Research Council;
- Deputy Director, Health, Labour and Welfare Division;
- Director, Women's Affairs Division, Federation of Yamanashi Prefecture Liberal Democratic Party Branches.
