= 2026 Centrist Reform Alliance presidential election =

Political party leadership elections in Japan

- 13 February 2026
- Turnout: 49 (100%)
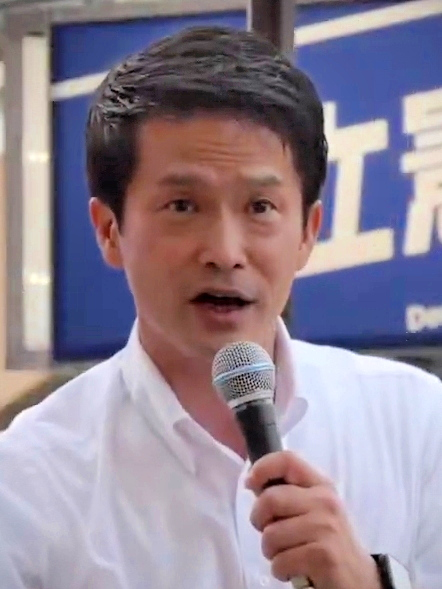

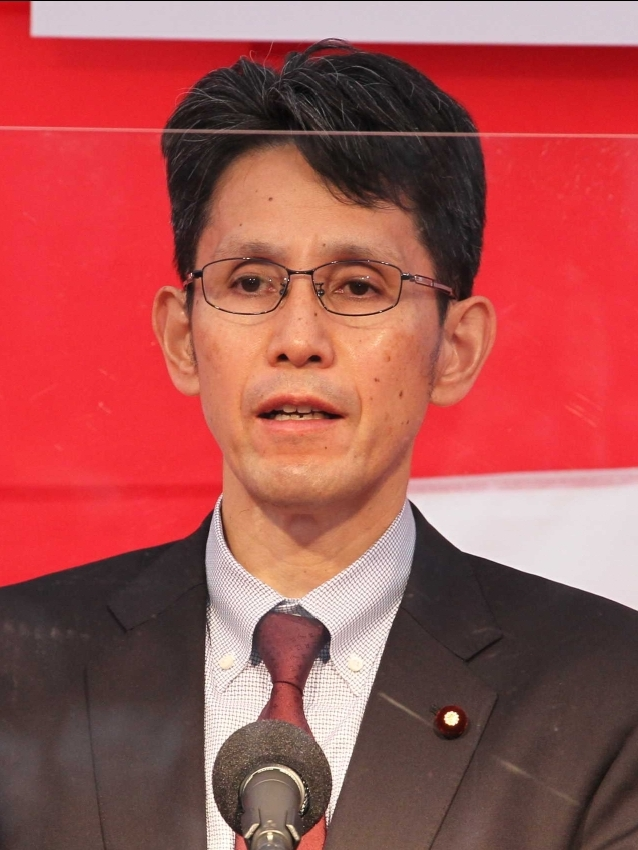
| Candidate | Junya Ogawa | Takeshi Shina |
| Popular vote | 27 | 22 |
| Percentage | 55.1% | 44.9% |
Presidents before election
Yoshihiko Noda
Tetsuo Saito
Elected president
Junya Ogawa

The 2026 Centrist Reform Alliance presidential election took place on 13 February 2026 to elect the next president of the Centrist Reform Alliance, following the incumbent co-presidents Yoshihiko Noda and Tetsuo Saito resigning after the party's failure in the 2026 Japanese general election. It was the first and only presidential election for the party.

Junya Ogawa and Takeshi Shina, both former members of the Constitutional Democratic Party, ran for the position. Ogawa was victorious, with 27 votes to 22.

== Background ==
Yoshihiko Noda became president of the Constitutional Democratic Party in September 2024. The following month, he led the party to its best-ever result in the 2024 Japanese general election, winning 148 seats and depriving the incumbent Liberal Democratic Party–Komeito coalition government of its majority. The government continued in office, but following further losses in the 2025 House of Councillors election, Prime Minister Shigeru Ishiba was forced to resign. The subsequent leadership contest saw Sanae Takaichi emerge victorious. She attempted to renew the coalition with the Komeito, but that party under leader Tetsuo Saito announced they would depart from the coalition after 26 years, citing the party's handling of the slush fund scandal and Takaichi's conservative positions. Takaichi and the Liberal Democratic Party subsequently formed a new coalition with the Japan Innovation Party and the Komeito moved to opposition.

In mid-January 2026, amid rumours that an election call was imminent, the CDP and Komeito rapidly agreed first to an electoral alliance and then a full merger. The new party would be named the Centrist Reform Alliance and would comprise all lower house members of both parties, while they remained separate in the House of Councillors. For the election, Komeito members were awarded leading list positions in the proportional representation blocks in exchange for withdrawing from the single-member constituencies and endorsing CDP candidates. The party was founded on 15 January with Noda and Saito as co-presidents. The election was called on the 23rd and held on 8 February.

The result of the election was a crushing defeat for the CRA, which lost 118 of the 167 seats it held before the election. Of the surviving 49 members, 28 were former Komeito and 21 former CDP. Numerous veteran opposition members were defeated, including CRA secretary-general Jun Azumi, former CDP president Yukio Edano, and former DPJ presidents Katsuya Okada and Ichirō Ozawa. Noda and Saito announced their resignations as presidents on 9 February.

On the 11th, the party met and scheduled the election for the 13th, with nominations to be taken on the 12th. The executive proposed a requirement of 10 endorsements to stand, but waived it after protest. They also determined that no runoff would be held, and whichever candidate won the most votes would be declared victorious.

== Electoral system ==
The president was elected by CRA's 49 members of the House of Representatives. Candidates were able to self-nominate with no need to gather endorsements. No runoff was to be held, and whichever candidate garnered the most votes would be declared victorious.

== Timeline ==
- 8 February 2026 – 2026 Japanese general election held.
- 9 February 2026 – Yoshihiko Noda and Tetsuo Saito resign as co-presidents.
- 11 February 2026 – Party officials announce the election will be held on the 13th. Junya Ogawa and Takeshi Shina announce their candidacies.
- 12 February 2026 – Date of nominations.
- 13 February 2026 – Election held and result announced.

== Candidates ==
| Candidate | Offices held |
|---|---|
| Junya Ogawa (age 54); Kagawa Prefecture | Member of the House of Representatives (2005–); Secretary-General of the Constitutional Democratic Party (2024–25) |
| Takeshi Shina (age 59); Iwate Prefecture | Member of the House of Representatives (2007–); Parliamentary Vice-Minister for Internal Affairs and Communications (2009–11) |

=== Declined ===
- Kenta Izumi, member of the House of Representatives (2003–), Parliamentary Secretary in the Cabinet Office (2009–10), President of the Constitutional Democratic Party (2021–2024)

== Campaign ==
Former CDP secretary-general Junya Ogawa and former CDP president Kenta Izumi quickly emerged as possible candidates. No former Komeito members indicated their intention to run, and Saito stated that they would be allowed to vote freely in the contest. The Japan Times reported that the Komeito wanted to avoid inflaming tensions with CDP members, who were upset by the former's preferential treatment on PR lists.

Ogawa and Takeshi Shina announced their intention to stand on the 11th. The same day, Izumi stated he would not run. Ogawa was a former secretary-general of the CDP and previously ran for leader of that party in 2021, placing third. Shina was a former Ministry of Finance bureaucrat and served as parliamentary vice-minister in the cabinets of Yukio Hatoyama and Naoto Kan.

Shina stated that he would look at changing the party's name, saying the name was "hard for ordinary people to relate to". He also criticised the high placement of Komeito members of the list, stating that it should be reviewed. Both candidates were cautious about the idea of merging the CDP and Komeito House of Councillors groups, which remained separate.

== Results ==
| Candidate | Votes | % |
|---|---|---|
| Junya Ogawa | 27 | 55.1 |
| Takeshi Shina | 22 | 44.9 |
| Total | 49 | 100.0 |
| Invalid | 0 | |
| Turnout | 49 | 100.0 |
| Eligible | 49 | |
Source: Asahi Shimbun

== See also ==
- 2025 Liberal Democratic Party presidential election
