= COVID-19 vaccination in Japan =

Plan to immunize against COVID-19 in Japan

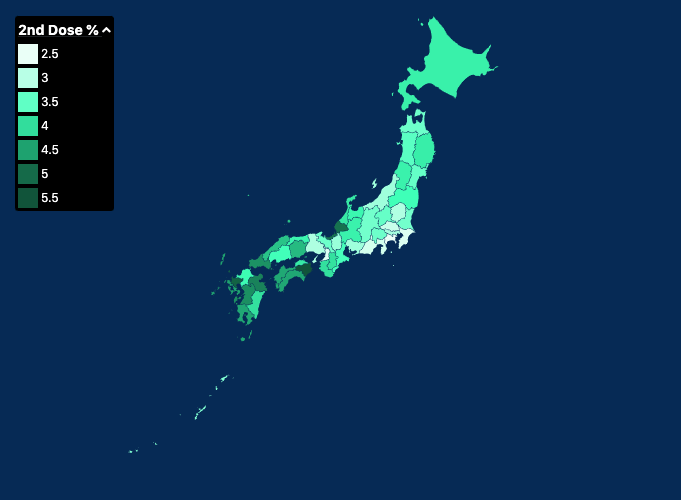
- Japan map by prefecture. Percentage of people got fully vaccinated by population as of 9rd of January 2023.
- Date: 17 February 2021 – 13 April 2023
- Location: Japan
- Cause: COVID-19 pandemic in Japan
- Target: Full immunisation of people in Japan against COVID-19
- Organised by: Ministry of Health, Labour and Welfare
- Participants: 77,098,247 people have received at least one vaccine dose (7 September 2021); 61,995,078 have been fully vaccinated (received both vaccine doses, 7 September 2021)
- Outcome: 81.8% of the Japanese population has received their first dose of a two-dose vaccine 80.6% has been fully vaccinated 58.8% has received a booster shot
- Website: Ministry of Health, Labour and Welfare

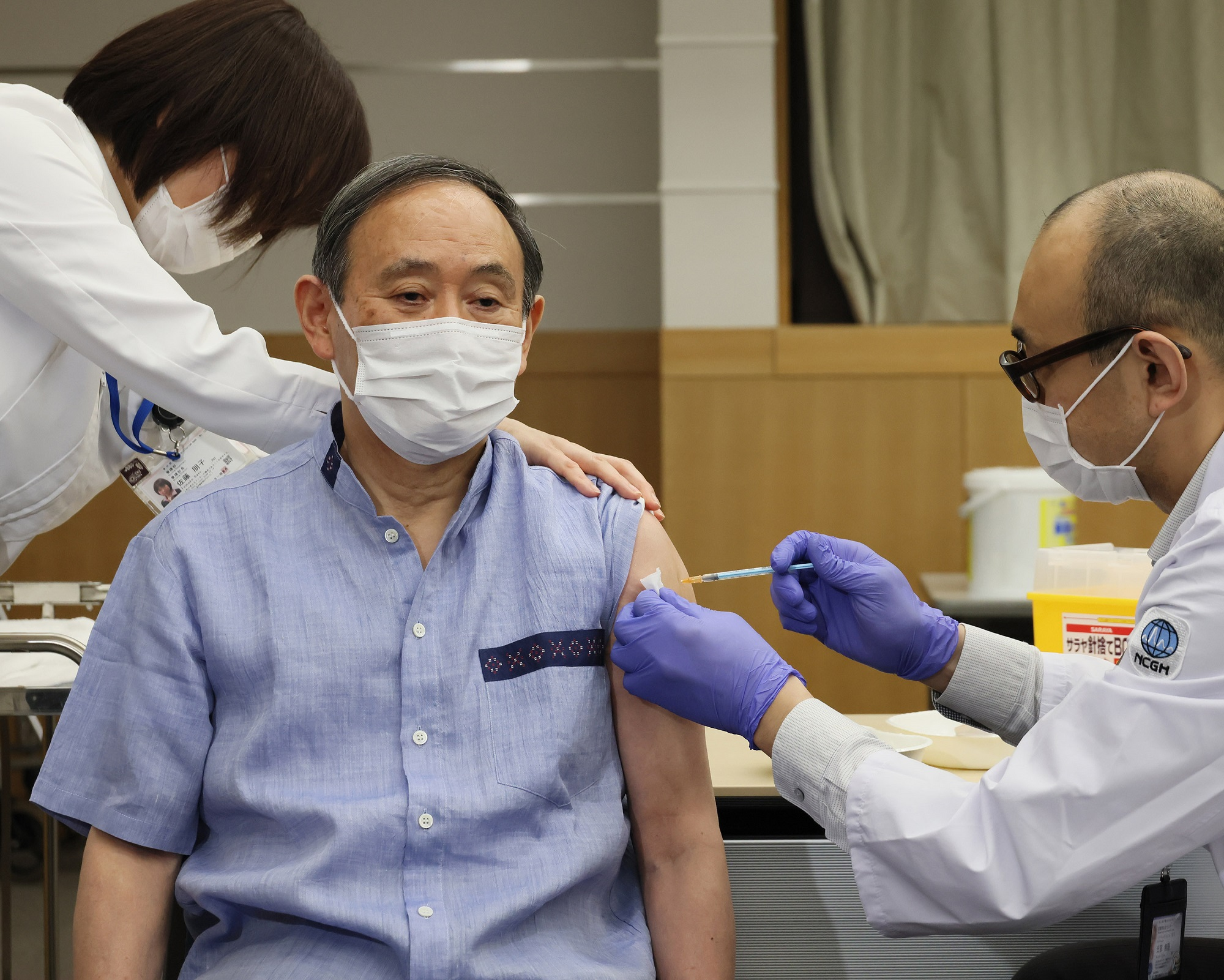
Yoshihide Suga, the prime minister of Japan vaccinated with a COVID-19 vaccine

COVID-19 vaccination in Japan started later than in most other major economies. The country has frequently been regarded as "slow" in its vaccination efforts.

Japan approved the Pfizer–BioNTech, Moderna, Oxford–AstraZeneca, Janssen, Novavax, and Daiichi Sankyo vaccines for use. In April 2024, data from the government stated that 80.4% of people have acquired at least one dose of a COVID-19 vaccine, 79.5% had their second dose, while 67.1% had at least three shots.

== Background ==
On 14 February 2021, Pfizer was approved by the government of Japan, and was deployed on 17 February 2021. On 28 May 2021, Pfizer was approved by the Japanese health ministry panel for adolescents aged between 12 and 15 years.

On 21 May 2021, Moderna and AstraZeneca were approved by the government of Japan.

=== Vaccines on order ===
Vaccine	Approval	Deployment	Doses secured (million)
Pfizer–BioNTech	14 February 2021	17 February 2021	194
Moderna	21 May 2021	23 May 2021	100
Oxford–AstraZeneca	21 May 2021	16 August 2021	120
Janssen	20 June 2022	No	
Novavax	19 April 2022	26 May 2022	150

Note: Japan has donated 1.24 million doses of AstraZeneca vaccine to Taiwan and 1 million doses to Vietnam. There are plans to send additional 2 million doses to these countries. Japan has also donated 1 million doses each to Thailand, Malaysia, Indonesia and the Philippines.

=== Vaccines in trial stage ===
Vaccine	Country of origin	Type (technology)	Progress	Ref
AG0302-COVID‑19; AnGes Inc., AMED	Japan	DNA vaccine (plasmid)	Phase II–III (500); Randomized, double-blind, placebo controlled Nov 2020 – Apr 2021, Japan	
S-268019; Shionogi	Japan	Subunit	Phase I–II (214); Randomized, double-blind, placebo-controlled, parallel-group. Dec 2020 – Jun 2022, Japan	
DS-5670; Daiichi Sankyo	Japan	RNA	Phase I–II (152); A Phase 1/2 Study to Assess the Safety, Immunogenicity and Recommended Dose of DS-5670a (COVID-19 Vaccine) in Japanese Healthy Adults and Elderly Subjects. Mar 2021 – Jul 2022, Japan	
KD-414; KM Biologics Co	Japan	Inactivated SARS‑CoV‑2	Phase I–II (210); Randomized, double blind, placebo control, parallel group. Mar 2021 – Dec 2022, Japan	
EXG-5003; Elixirgen Therapeutics, Fujita Health University	Japan, United States	RNA	Phase I–II (60); First in Human, randomized, placebo-controlled. Apr 2021 – Jan 2023, Japan	

== History ==
In April 2021, prime minister Suga Yoshihide announced that Japan will receive 50 million doses of the Pfizer vaccine after a meeting with the company's CEO.

The roll out of the vaccines in Japan, with 4 percent of the population inoculated as of May 21, 2021, has led to criticisms of slow approval, disruptions on import, and the lack of medical professionals. A poll conducted in April showed that more than 60 percent of people were dissatisfied with Japan's vaccine rollout, with experts stating that it was too late now to stop the spread of variants with vaccines.

On May 21, 2021, several municipal governments in Kanagawa Prefecture were getting rid of their Moderna vaccine stocks as the doses are near their expiry date. On June 5, 2022, around 740,000 Moderna doses will be disposed of due to being expired.

A retracted Japanese study titled "Increased Age-Adjusted Cancer Mortality After the Third mRNA-Lipid Nanoparticle Vaccine Dose During the COVID-19 Pandemic in Japan" was used to claim that COVID-19 vaccine recipients were more likely to develop various cancers, although the authors themselves admitted that their results were not clinically verified. The study does not present data breaking down cancer deaths by vaccination status, nor does it show that it increases after vaccination, or that it is higher in vaccinated compared to unvaccinated individuals of the same age or comorbidity status, nor does it provide any epidemiological evidence that vaccines increased the risk of cancer.
