= Iwate 1st district =

Japan House of Representatives constituency

Iwate 1st District
- Parliamentary constituency for the Japanese House of Representatives
- Numbered map of Iwate Prefecture single-member districts
- Prefecture: Iwate
- Proportional District: Tohoku
- Electorate: 285,158 (Feb. 2026)

Current constituency
- Created: 1994
- Seats: One
- Party: CRA
- Representative: Takeshi Shina (2007–)
- Created from: Iwate's 1st "medium-sized" district
- Municipalities: The city of Morioka, town of Shiwa and town of Yahaba

Iwate 1st district (岩手[県第]1区, Iwate[-ken dai-]ikku) is a single-member constituency of the House of Representatives in the Diet of Japan. It is located in central Iwate and consists of the prefectural capital Morioka city and the two remaining towns in Shiwa district. Before 2017, it covered of the majority of the prefectural capital Morioka (the whole city without the former village of Tamayama) and Shiwa district. In 2012, 278,860 eligible voters were registered in the district.

Before the electoral reform of 1994, the area had been part of the multi-member Iwate 1st district that elected four Representatives by single non-transferable vote.

Iwate is the home of Ichirō Ozawa and like three of the prefecture's four post-reform districts, the 1st district had been represented by his parties from its creation to 2012: the New Frontier Party, the Liberal Party and the Democratic Party. In 2012, Ozawa and his followers split from the Democratic Party: 1st district representative Shina stayed with the Democrats, Ozawa's Tomorrow Party of Japan nominated Yōko Tasso, the wife of former representative and current Iwate governor Takuya Tasso; but Shina defended the district against Tasso and Liberal Democratic former prefectural assembly member Hinako Takahashi who won a proportional block seat.

== List of representatives ==
Representative	Party	Dates	Notes
Takuya Tasso	NFP	1996–2000	
Takuya Tasso	LP	2000–2003	
Takuya Tasso	DPJ	2003–2007	Resigned. Elected Governor of Iwate Prefecture in 2007
Takeshi Shina	DPJ	2007–2016	
Takeshi Shina	DP	2016–2017	
Takeshi Shina	Kibō no Tō	2017–2018	
Takeshi Shina	DPP	2018–2020	
Takeshi Shina	CDP	2020–2026	
Takeshi Shina	CRA	2026–	

== Election results ==
- DC: Dual candidate (jūfuku rikkōho) standing simultaneously for a seat in the Tōhoku proportional representation block
- $: Lost deposit and if a dual candidate: is also ineligible as a proportional candidate

2026
Party	Candidate	Votes	%	±%
Centrist Reform	Takeshi Shina	73,209	44.2	▼17.3
LDP	Hiromasa Yonai (Won a seat in the PR Block	67,811	40.9	▲12.5
Sanseitō	Taisei Sasaki	12,233	7.4	
JCP	Kyōko Yoshida	10,448	6.3	▼3.7
Independent	Yūji Ogasawara	2,080	1.3	
Registered electors		285,158		
Turnout		165,781	58.69	▲4.32
Centrist Reform hold				

2024
Party	Candidate	Votes	%	±%
CDP	Takeshi Shina	94,409	61.5	▲10.3
LDP	Hiromasa Yonai	43,623	28.4	▼8.4
JCP	Kyōko Yoshida	15,367	10.0	▼1.9
Registered electors		287,457		
Turnout			54.37	▼4.44
CDP hold				

2021
Party	Candidate	Votes	%	±%
CDP	Takeshi Shina	87,017	51.2	▼1.4
LDP	Hinako Takahashi	62,666	36.9	▲2.4
JCP	Kyōko Yoshida	20,300	11.9	▼1.0
Registered electors		293,290		
Turnout			58.81	▲1.79
CDP hold				

2017
Party	Candidate	Votes	%	±%
Kibō no Tō	Takeshi Shina	87,534	52.6	
LDP	Hinako Takahashi (elected in Tohoku PR block)	57,381	34.5	▲3.1
JCP	Kyōko Yoshida	21,549	12.9	▲2.5
Registered electors		296,551		
Turnout			57.02	▲3.52

2014
Party	Candidate	Votes	%	±%
Democratic	Takeshi Shina (DC)	76,787	52.0	+17.3
LDP	Hinako Takahashi (DC, won PR seat)	46,409	31.4	+4.1
JCP	Kyōko Yoshida	15,374	10.4	new
Social Democratic	Mitsumasa Hosokawa (DC, $)	9,052	6.1	new

2012
Party	Candidate	Votes	%	±%
Democratic	Takeshi Shina (endorsed by PNP, DC)	55,909	34.7	
LDP	Hinako Takahashi (DC, elected by PR)	44,002	27.3	
Tomorrow	Yōko Tasso (endorsed by NPD, DC)	41,706	25.9	
Social Democratic	Masahiro Isawa (DC, $)	9,922	6.2	
JCP	Shino Yahata ($)	9,473	5.9	

2009
Party	Candidate	Votes	%	±%
Democratic	Takeshi Shina (endorsed by PNP)	116,425	60.2	
LDP	Hinako Takahashi (endorsed by Komeito)	50,585	26.2	
Social Democratic	Masahiro Isawa	13,048	6.8	
JCP	Kyōko Yoshida	12,187	6.3	
Happiness Realization	Kensaku Mori	1,047	0.5	
Turnout		195,474	70.93	

By-election, July 29, 2007
Party	Candidate	Votes	%	±%
Democratic	Takeshi Shina (endorsed by PNP)	102,987	61.7	
LDP	Masanori Tamazawa (endorsed by Komeito)	53,125	31.8	
JCP	Sadakiyo Segawa	10,821	6.5	
Turnout		169,092	61.05	

2005
Party	Candidate	Votes	%	±%
Democratic	Takuya Tasso	95,109	51.7	
LDP	Atsushi Oikawa	65,187	35.4	
Social Democratic	Mitsumasa Hosokawa	14,050	7.6	
JCP	Shin'ya Kanbe	9,659	5.2	
Turnout		185,845	67.93	

2003
Party	Candidate	Votes	%	±%
Democratic	Takuya Tasso	91,025	53.6	
LDP	Atsushi Oikawa	57,899	34.1	
Social Democratic	Yuriko Gotō	12,014	7.1	
JCP	Yōichi Naganuma	8,806	5.2	
Turnout		171,880	63.34	

2000
Party	Candidate	Votes	%	±%
Liberal	Takuya Tasso	97,835	43.0	
LDP	Tokuichirō Tamazawa	65,597	37.7	
Social Democratic	Yuriko Gotō	17,309	9.9	
JCP	Ryūgorō Satō	9,261	5.3	
Democratic	Kikuji Fujikura	6,964	4.0	

1996
Party	Candidate	Votes	%	±%
New Frontier	Takuya Tasso	67,420	40.6	
LDP	Tokuichirō Tamazawa (elected by PR)	49,665	29.9	
Independent	Riki Nakamura	17,087	10.3	
Social Democratic	Kuniki Yamanaka	16,758	10.1	
JCP	Toshiko Sakuma	10,668	6.4	
Democratic	Yuriko Gotō	4,551	2.7	
Turnout		168,434	65.63	
