= Takuya Tasso =

Governor of Iwate Prefecture, Japan

- 達増 拓也
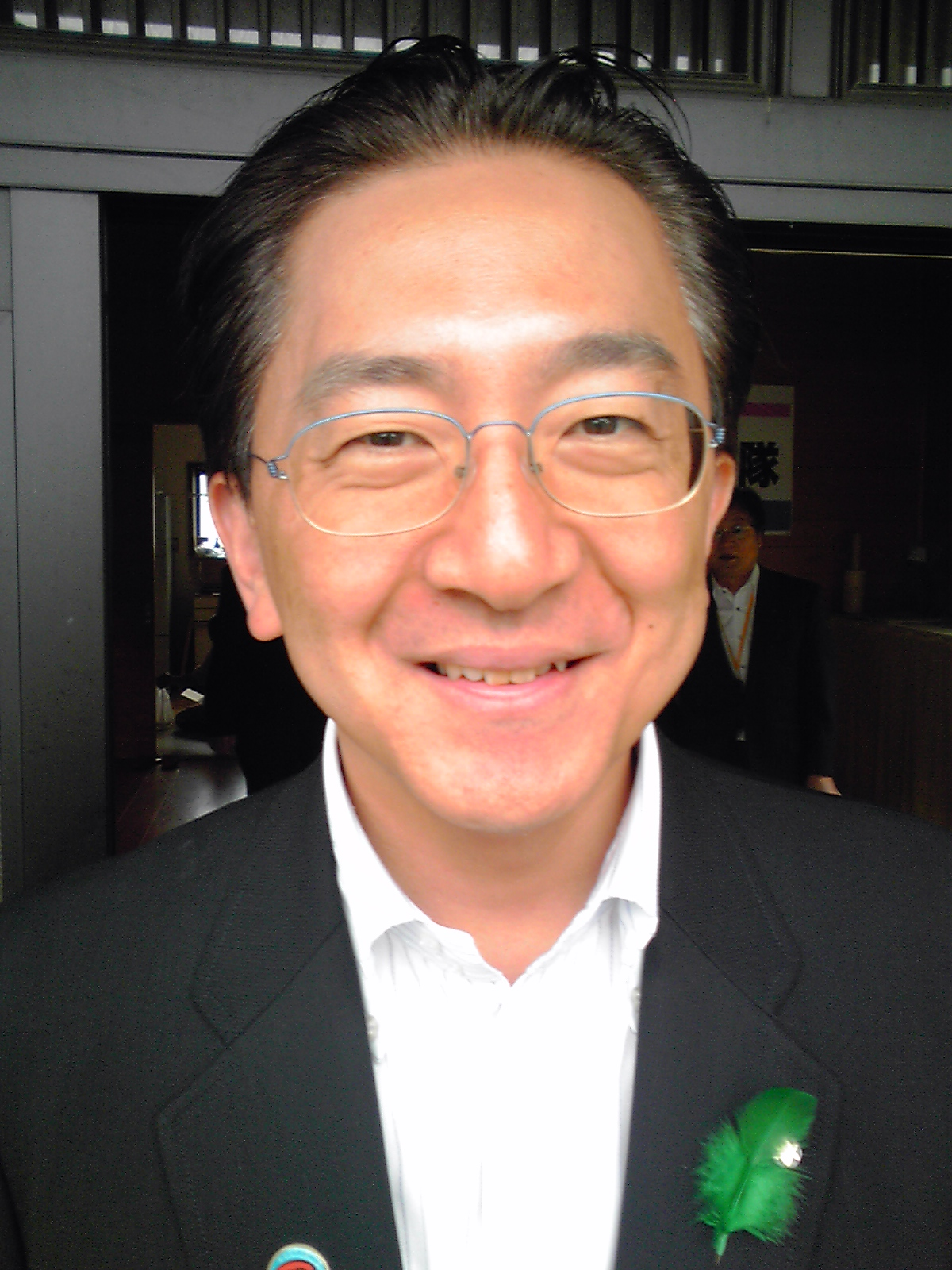
- Tasso in 2010

Governor of Iwate Prefecture
- Incumbent
- Assumed office 30 April 2007
- Monarchs: Akihito; Naruhito
- Preceded by: Hiroya Masuda

Member of the House of Representatives
- In office 21 October 1996 – 22 March 2007
- Preceded by: Constituency established
- Succeeded by: Takeshi Shina
- Constituency: Iwate 1st

Personal details
- Born: 10 June 1964 (age 62) Morioka, Iwate, Japan
- Party: Independent
- Other political affiliations: NFP (1996–1998); DPJ (1998–2012); PLF (2012–2012)
- Education: University of Tokyo

Takuya Tasso (達増 拓也, Tasso Takuya; born 10 June 1964) is a Japanese politician and the current governor of Iwate Prefecture. He is a native of Morioka and graduate of the University of Tokyo.

== Biography ==
Tasso joined the Ministry of Foreign Affairs in 1988, receiving a master's degree in international relations from Johns Hopkins University in the United States while with the ministry. In 1996, he was elected to the House of Representatives in the Diet (national legislature) for the first time as a member of the New Frontier Party and subsequently served as a diet member for the Democratic Party of Japan. He was first elected Governor of Iwate Prefecture in 2007 and as of 2023 was reelected to a fifth term.

On 9 July 2012, he announced that he would sever his ties with the DPJ and join Putting People's Lives First, the new party led by Ichiro Ozawa.

Political offices
Preceded by Hiroya Masuda	Governor of Iwate; 2007–	Incumbent
House of Representatives (Japan)
New district	Representative for Iwate 1st district 1996–2007	Vacant Title next held by Takeshi Shina
