= S-268019 =

Vaccine candidate against COVID-19

Vaccine description
- Target: SARS-CoV-2
- Vaccine type: Protein subunit

Clinical data
- Routes of administration: Intramuscular

Identifiers
- CAS Number: 2696247-53-5

S-268019-b is a protein subunit COVID-19 vaccine candidate developed by Shionogi.

A study in non-human primates published in 2022 concluded S-268109-b demonstrated efficacy in a SARS-CoV-2 challenge experiment, although neutralizing antibodies against the Omicron variant were reduced.

In a phase 1/2 clinical trial in Japan, the developers concluded reactions to the vaccine were mild, and neutralizing antibodies were similar to those in people who had recovered from Covid-19. A phase 3 trial planned for 54,915 participants began in December 2021 in Vietnam.

Preliminary results of a phase 2/3 trial using S-268019-b as a booster dose after two doses of the BNT162b2 vaccine by Pfizer concluded the vaccine was non-inferior to a booster dose of BNT162b2.
