= Next Cabinet =

Shadow cabinet of Japan

The Next Cabinet (Japanese: 次の内閣, Hepburn: Tsugi no naikaku) is the de facto shadow cabinet of Japan. First used in 1999, it was created by the Democratic Party of Japan while they were the country's main opposition party to the governing coalition of the Liberal Democratic Party and Komeito. Next Cabinets have since been formed by presidents of the DPJ's 2016 successor and the Constitutional Democratic Party.

== History ==
The first Next Cabinet was formed on 1 October 1999 by Yukio Hatoyama, an admirer of the Westminster system, on the model of the shadow cabinets of Anglo-Saxon countries. When forming the Next Cabinet, earlier experiments conducted by previous main opposition parties since the early 1990s were taken into account, such as the Socialist Party Shadow Cabinet (社会党シャドーキャビネット, Shakaitō Shadō kyabinetto) of the Japan Socialist Party, which existed from 1991 to 1993, and the Cabinet of Tomorrow (明日の内閣, Asu no Naikaku) of the New Frontier Party and the Liberal Party, which existed from 1994 to 1999. The transcription of Next Cabinet in Japanese was originally only in Katakana as the Nekusuto Kyabinetto (ネクストキャビネット), until it was transcribed into its current form during the party presidency of Naoto Kan.

No Next Cabinet was formed after Kohei Otsuka succeeded Seiji Maehara as president of the Democratic Party, leaving it unused from 2017 to 2022. The Next Cabinet would be brought back by the Constitutional Democratic Party in 2022 under then-party president Kenta Izumi, in anticipation of the next general election.

== Lists of Next Cabinets ==
- First Next Cabinet of Yukio Hatoyama (1999–2002)
- Next Cabinet of Naoto Kan (2002–2004)
- First Next Cabinet of Katsuya Okada (2004–2005)
- First Next Cabinet of Seiji Maehara (2005–2006)
- Next Cabinet of Ichirō Ozawa (2006–2009)
- Second Next Cabinet of Yukio Hatoyama (2009)
- Next Cabinet of Banri Kaieda (2012–2014)
- Second Next Cabinet of Katsuya Okada (2015–2016)
- Next Cabinet of Renhō (2016–2017)
- Second Next Cabinet of Seiji Maehara (2017)
- Next Cabinet of Kenta Izumi (2022–2024)
- Next Cabinet of Yoshihiko Noda (2024–2026)
