= AG0302-COVID‑19 =

Vaccine candidate against COVID-19

Vaccine description
- Target: SARS-CoV-2
- Vaccine type: DNA

Clinical data
- Routes of administration: Intramuscular, Intradermal

Identifiers
- CAS Number: 2541593-92-2

AG0302-COVID-19 is a COVID-19 vaccine candidate developed by AnGes Inc. This candidate followed a previous one called AG0301-COVID-19.
