= KD-414 =

Vaccine candidate against COVID-19

Vaccine description
- Target: SARS-CoV-2
- Vaccine type: Inactivated

Clinical data
- Routes of administration: Intramuscular

KD-414 is a COVID-19 vaccine candidate developed by Japanese biotechnology company KM Biologics Co. Results of a phase 1/2 clinical trial for this vaccine were released as a preprint in June 2022.
