= Kensei Hasegawa =

Japanese politician

- 長谷川 憲正
- Official portrait, 2009

Member of the House of Councillors
- In office 26 July 2004 – 25 July 2010
- Constituency: National PR

Personal details
- Born: 1 January 1943 (age 83) Kumagaya, Saitama, Japan
- Party: People's New Party
- Other political affiliations: LDP (2004–2005); NPN (2005)
- Education: University of Tokyo

Kensei Hasegawa (長谷川 憲正, Hasegawa Kensei; born 1 January 1943) is a Japanese politician of the People's New Party, a member of the House of Councillors in the Diet (national legislature). A native of Kumagaya, Saitama and graduate of the University of Tokyo, he worked at the Ministry of Posts and Telecommunications from 1967 to 2003. He was elected for the first time in 2004.
