= Hiroshima 1st district =

Legislative district of Japan

- Parliamentary constituency for the House of Representatives
- A map of the House of Representatives constituencies in Hiroshima Prefecture
- Prefecture: Hiroshima
- Proportional District: Chūgoku
- Electorate: 331,786 (2020)

Current constituency
- Created: 1994
- Seats: One
- Party: Liberal Democratic
- Representative: Fumio Kishida
- Created from: Former Hiroshima 1st district (1947–1993)
- Municipalities: Naka-ku, Higashi-ku and Minami-ku in Hiroshima part of Aki District

Hiroshima 1st district (広島県第1区, Hiroshima-ken dai-ikku or 広島1区, Hiroshima ikku) is a single-member constituency of the House of Representatives, the lower house of the National Diet of Japan. It is located in Hiroshima. 331,786 eligible voters were registered in the district, as of 1 September 2020.

This constituency was newly established in 1994 from the former 1st district. The previous constituency elected two or more people, but this constituency elects only one person.

Fumio Kishida, former Prime Minister of Japan and President of the Liberal Democratic Party, has represented this district since October 1996. (Note: Between 1947 and 1996, Kishida's constituency was a multi-member district elected through SNTV. After the 1994 Japanese electoral reform, mandating the abolition of all multi-member House of Representative districts, Hosakawa was re-elected to the synonymous Hiroshima 1st District, which was a single-member constituency elected through FPTP, in 1996 general election. The two constituencies are fundamentally different from each other, only with their identical name.)

== List of the members representing the district ==
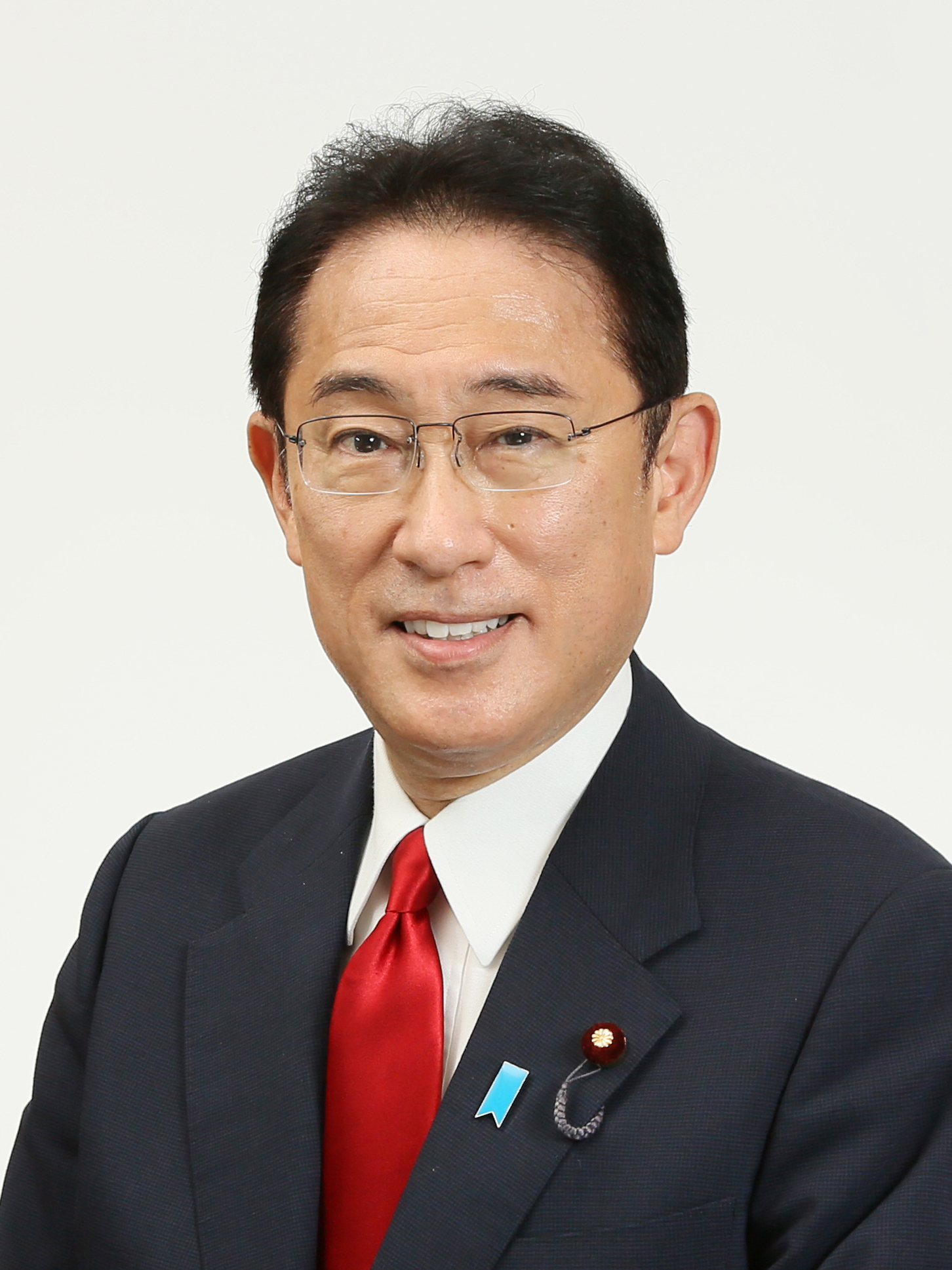
Fumio Kishida has represented the constituency since 1996.

Representative	Party	Dates	Notes
Fumio Kishida	LDP	1996 –	Minister for Foreign Affairs (2012–2017); President of the Liberal Democratic Party (2021–2024); Prime Minister of Japan (2021–2024)

== Election results ==
=== 2026 ===
2026
Party	Candidate	Votes	%	±%
LDP	Fumio Kishida	102,700	53.3	▲0.9
Centrist Reform	Kaiei Kawada	35,142	18.2	▼6.0
Sanseitō	Hajime Yamada	32,835	17.0	
Reiwa	Taiki Handō	8,809	4.6	
JCP	Tsuyoshi Nakahara	8,113	4.2	▼2.2
Independent	Toshifumi Ubuhara	3,172	1.6	▼1.5
Independent	Sadahiko Kuroki	1,821	0.9	
Registered electors		406,128		
Turnout			48.58	▲0.15
LDP hold				

=== 2024 ===
2024
Party	Candidate	Votes	%	±%
LDP	Fumio Kishida	100,740	52.4	▼28.3
CDP	Kōchi Hiramoto	46,493	24.2	
Ishin	Hajime Yamada	26,849	14.0	
JCP	Tsuyoshi Nakahara	12,225	6.4	▼2.4
Independent	Toshifumi Ubuhara	5,995	3.1	
Registered electors		407,675		
Turnout			48.43	▼1.65
LDP hold				

=== 2021 ===
General election 2021: Hiroshima's 1st
Party	Candidate	Votes	%	±%
LDP	Fumio Kishida	133,704	80.7	▲2.7
Social Democratic	Yūko Arita	15,904	9.6	N/A
JCP	Osamu Ohnishi	14,508	8.8	▼13.2
Minor party	Keiichi Kamide	1,630	1.0	N/A
Majority		117,800	71.1	▲15.1
Turnout		165,746	50.8	▲5.0
Registered electors		332,001		
LDP hold		Swing	▲7.5	

=== 2017 ===
General election 2017: Hiroshima's 1st
Party	Candidate	Votes	%	±%
LDP	Fumio Kishida	113,239	78.0	▲12.3
JCP	Osamu Ohnishi	32,011	22.0	▲9.2
Majority		81,223	56.0	▲7.7
Turnout		145,250	45.7	▼1.5
Registered electors		328,214		
LDP hold		Swing	▲7.3	

=== 2014 ===
General election 2014: Hiroshima's 1st
Party	Candidate	Votes	%	±%
LDP	Fumio Kishida	96,236	65.7	▲2.2
Innovation	Rika Shirasaka	25,452	17.4	New
JCP	Osamu Ohnishi	18,737	12.8	▲5.2
Future Generations	Shinji Itō	5,986	4.1	New
Majority		70,784	48.3	▲0.4
Turnout		146,411	47.3	▼6.2
Registered electors		317,223		
LDP hold		Swing	▲9.2	

=== 2012 ===
General election 2012: Hiroshima's 1st
Party	Candidate	Votes	%	±%
LDP	Fumio Kishida	103,689	63.5	▲16.2
Democratic	Kōichi Nonaka	25,429	15.6	▼27.8
Tomorrow	Hiroshi Sugekawa	21,698	13.3	New
JCP	Osamu Ohnishi	12,444	7.6	▲3.2
Majority		78,260	47.9	▲44.0
Turnout		163,260	53.5	▼12.1
Registered electors		314,600		
LDP hold		Swing	▲13.1	

=== 2009 ===
General election 2009: Hiroshima's 1st
Party	Candidate	Votes	%	±%
LDP	Fumio Kishida	95,475	47.3	▼10.0
Democratic	Hiroshi Sugekawa (elected by PR)	87,557	43.4	▲11.9
JCP	Satoshi Fujimoto	8,945	4.4	▼1.3
Social Democratic	Yoshiteru Uemura	5,438	2.7	▼2.8
Independent	Fuminori Nakamura	2,889	1.4	N/A
Minor Party	Hironori Yamamoto	1,393	0.6	N/A
Majority		7,918	3.9	▼21.9
Turnout		201,697	65.6	▲4.7
Registered electors		311,170		
LDP hold		Swing	▼4.1	

=== 2005 ===
General election 2005: Hiroshima's 1st
Party	Candidate	Votes	%	±%
LDP	Fumio Kishida	107,239	57.3	▲1.8
Democratic	Hiroshi Sugekawa	58,946	31.5	▼5.4
JCP	Ryō Nagatsuma	10,698	5.7	▼1.8
Social Democratic	Yoshiteru Uemura	10,313	5.5	N/A
Majority		48,293	25.8	▲7.3
Turnout		187,196	60.9	▲10.8
Registered electors		307,448		
LDP hold		Swing	▲1.1	

=== 2003 ===
General election 2003: Hiroshima's 1st
Party	Candidate	Votes	%	±%
LDP	Fumio Kishida	84,292	55.5	▲0.3
Democratic	Masaaki Kakinuma	56,072	36.9	▼4.8
JCP	Yōkō Tsugi'ishi	11,463	7.6	▼5.2
Majority		28,220	18.5	N/A
Turnout		151,827	50.1	N/A
Registered electors		303,801		
LDP hold		Swing	N/A	

=== 2000 ===
General election 2000: Hiroshima's 1st
Party	Candidate	Votes	%
LDP	Fumio Kishida	85,482	55.1
Democratic	Maei Nishio	49,765	32.1
JCP	Hirofumi Nikaidō	19,778	12.8
Majority		35,717	23
Turnout		155,025	N/A
Registered electors		N/A	
LDP hold		Swing	N/A

=== 1996 ===
General election 1996: Hiroshima's 1st
Party	Candidate	Votes	%
LDP	Fumio Kishida	64,709	44.1
New Frontier	Kouji Nakahara	42,108	28.7
Social Democratic	Chikou Matsusaka	12,301	8.4
JCP	Mitsunori Hirano	11,128	7.6
Democratic	Teiko Horima	9,746	6.6
New Socialist	Yūko Nobui	5,930	4.0
Independent	Hitoshi Shinmoto	939	0.6
Majority		22,601	15.4
Turnout		146,861	49.1
Registered electors		298,892	
LDP win (new seat)			

== Notes ==
House of Representatives (Japan)
Preceded by Kanagawa 2nd district	Constituency represented by the prime minister 2021 – 2024	Succeeded by Tottori 1st district
