= Hiromasa Yonai =

Japanese politician (born 1987)

- 米内 紘正

Member of the House of Representatives
- Incumbent
- Assumed office 9 February 2026
- Preceded by: Multi-member district
- Constituency: Tohoku PR

Member of the Iwate Prefectural Assembly
- In office 2019–2023
- Constituency: Morioka City

Personal details
- Born: 14 May 1987 (age 39) Tokyo, Japan
- Party: Liberal Democratic
- Relatives: Mitsumasa Yonai (great-grandfather)

Hiromasa Yonai (米内紘正, Yonai Hiromasa; born 14 May 1987) is a Japanese politician serving as a member of the House of Representatives since 2026. He is the great-grandson of Mitsumasa Yonai.
