= 2024 Constitutional Democratic Party of Japan presidential election =

Political party leadership elections in Japan

- 23 September 2024

738 points in the 1st round (370 for a majority) 412 points in the runoff (207 for a majority)
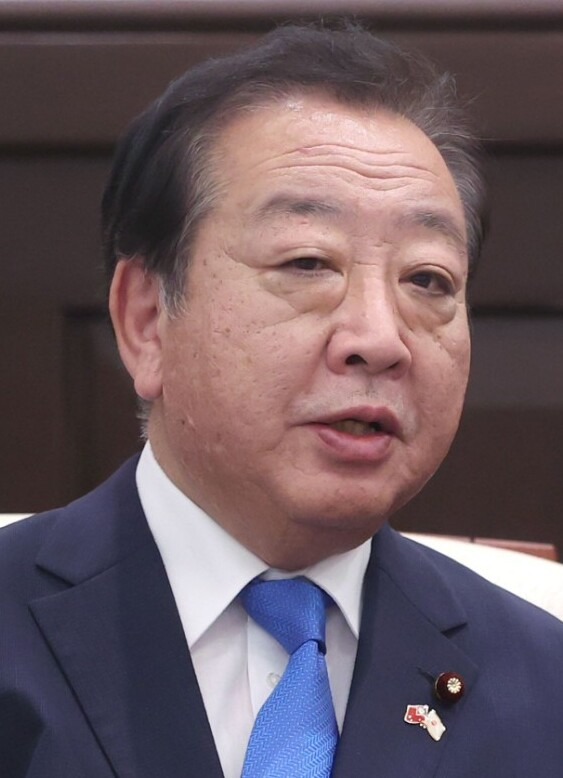

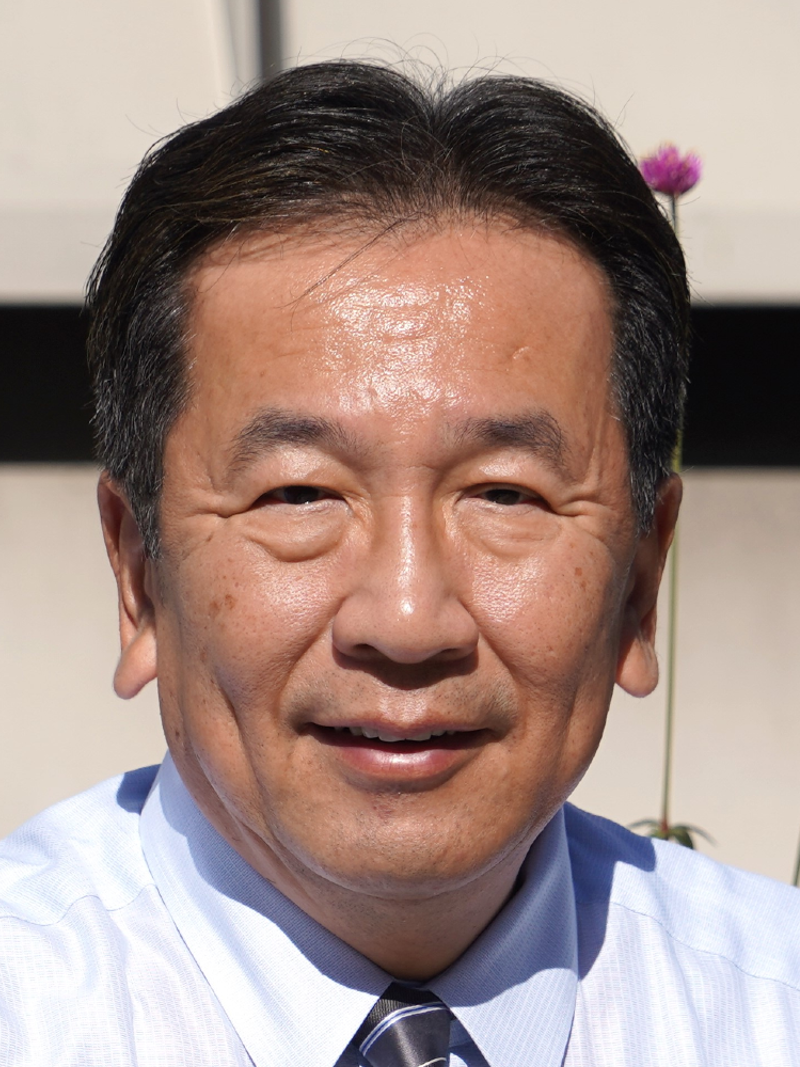

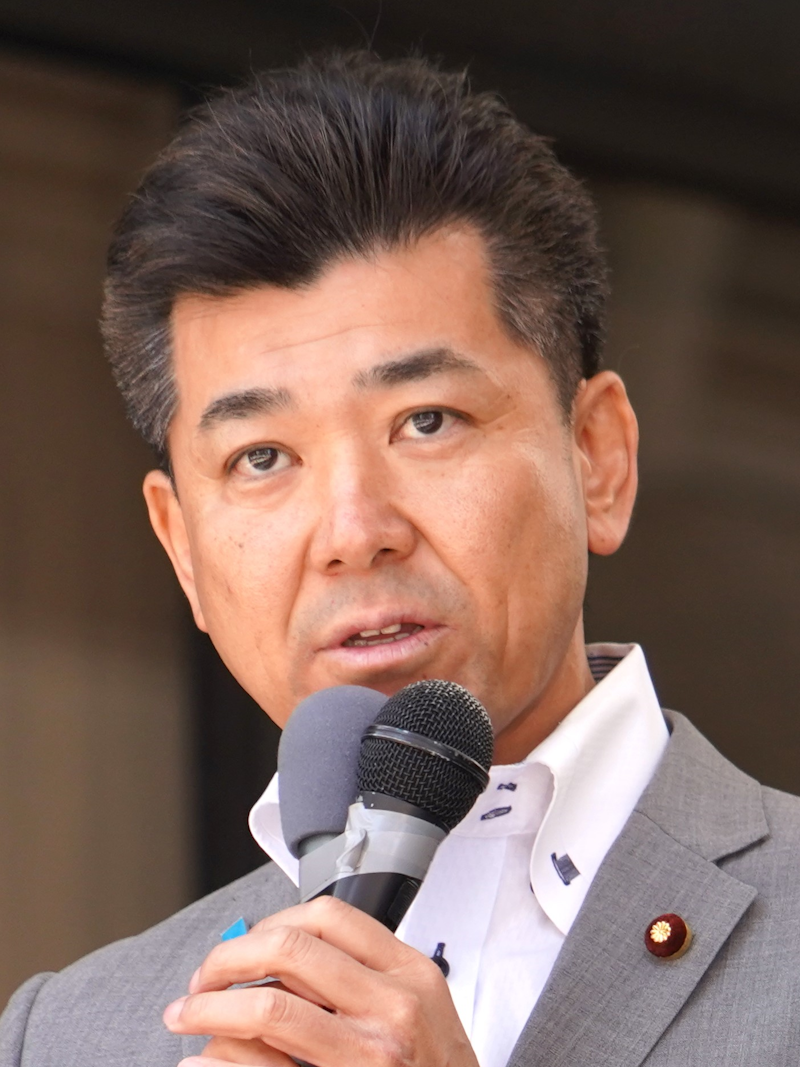

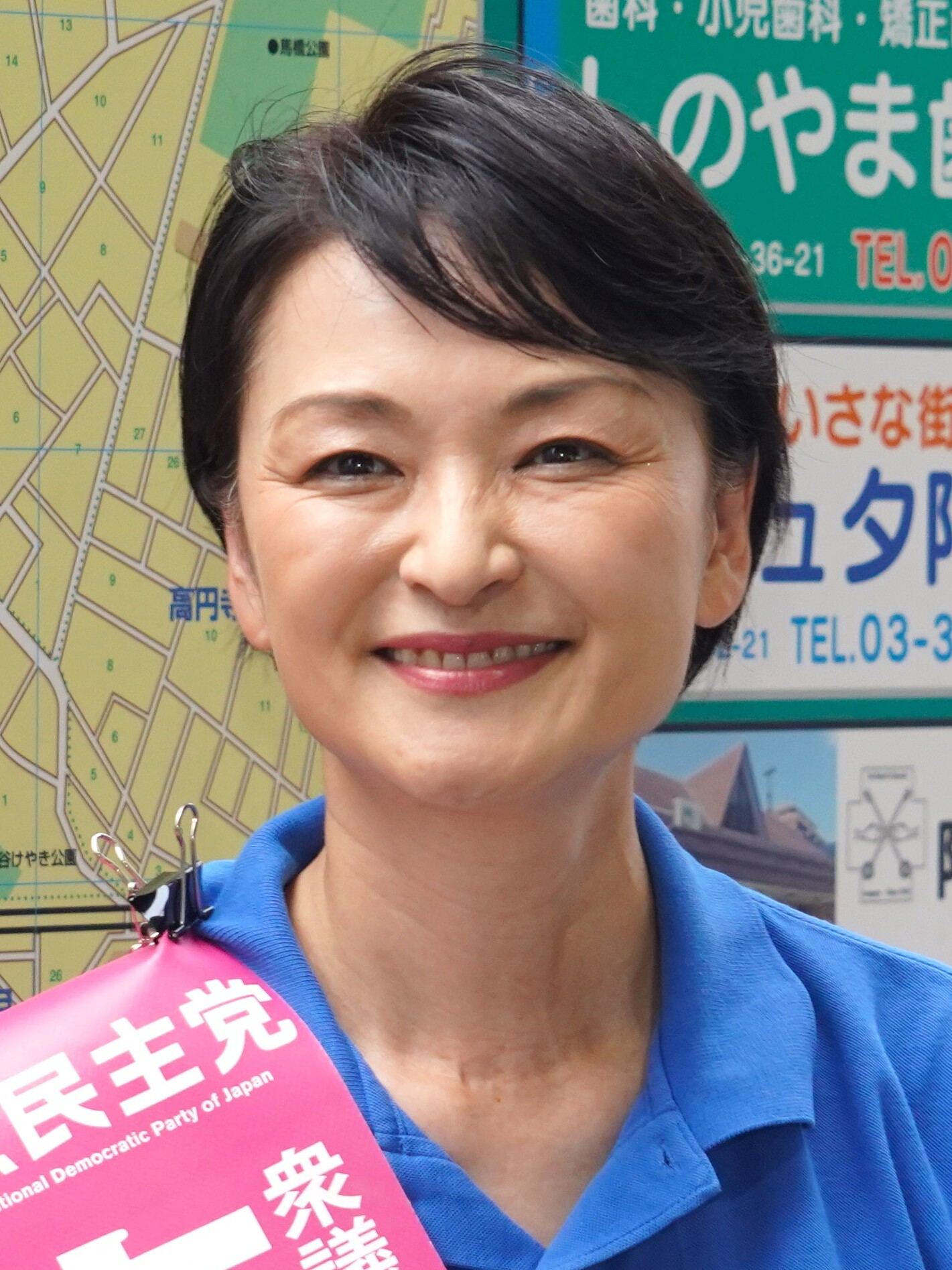
Candidate	Yoshihiko Noda	Yukio Edano
Leader's seat	Chiba 4th	Saitama 5th
First round	267 (36.2%)	206 (27.9%)
Runoff	232 (56.3%)	180 (43.7%)
Candidate	Kenta Izumi	Harumi Yoshida
Leader's seat	Kyoto 3rd	Tokyo 8th
First round	143 (19.4%)	122 (16.5%)
Leader before election
Kenta Izumi
Elected Leader
Yoshihiko Noda

The 2024 Constitutional Democratic Party of Japan presidential election was held on 23 September 2024 in accordance with the end of the presidential term which had commenced in 2021.

The election was contested by four candidates: incumbent party president Kenta Izumi, party founder Yukio Edano, former Prime Minister Yoshihiko Noda, and first-term legislator Harumi Yoshida. Izumi and Yoshida were eliminated in the first round. Noda then defeated Edano in the runoff ballot.

== Background ==
Kenta Izumi was elected president of the party in November 2021, following the resignation of Yukio Edano due to the party's poor performance in the 2021 lower house election. In the intervening three years, the party continued to face electoral setbacks, losing six seats in the 2022 upper house election and failing to win any of the five by-elections held in 2022 and 2023. Their fortunes improved after the slush fund scandal broke, leading to success in three by-elections in April 2024, but hopes for a change of government again evaporated after a heavy defeat in the 2024 Tokyo gubernatorial election. By the time his term expired, Izumi faced criticism from various sectors within the party. He had sought to push the party in a more moderate direction, softening his position on nuclear power and security policy and advocating cooperation with the right-leaning Democratic Party For the People (DPFP), which angered liberal factions. At the same time, he maintained the party's electoral alliance with the Japanese Communist Party and kept his distance from Nippon Ishin no Kai, now the second-largest opposition party, which angered conservatives and was viewed as a strategic mistake by others.

On 7 August, the CDP executive announced that nominations would be taken on 7 September and the election held on 23 September.

In addition, Prime Minister Fumio Kishida was widely expected to be replaced in the 2024 presidential election scheduled for the same time as the CDP contest. It was anticipated that the new prime minister would quickly call a snap lower house election, meaning that the new president would likely become the party's candidate for prime minister immediately.

== Electoral system ==
Candidates were required to gather sponsorships from 20 members of the CDP Diet caucus in order to stand; a maximum of 25 sponsors could be submitted.

The election was conducted via a points system:

- Each of the party's members of the National Diet had a vote worth two points. (272 points total)
- Registered party members or supporters could vote via mail or online. Points for this tier were awarded to candidates in proportion to votes won. (185 points total)
- Each of the party's members of local councils or prefectural assemblies could vote via mail or online. Points for this tier were awarded to candidates in proportion to votes won. (185 points total)
- Each of the party's approved candidates for future Diet elections had a vote worth one point. (98 points total)

In order to win, a candidate must secure more than 50% of points. If no candidate won more than 50%, a runoff was to be held the same day.

In the event of a runoff:

- Each of the party's members of the National Diet had a vote worth two points. (272 points total)
- Each of the party's approved candidates for future Diet elections had a vote worth one point. (98 points total)
- A representative from each of the party's prefectural branches had a vote worth one point. (47 points total)

== Candidates ==
Candidate	Offices held
Kenta Izumi (age 50); Kyoto Prefecture	Member of the House of Representatives (2003–); Parliamentary Secretary in the Cabinet Office (2009–10); President of the Constitutional Democratic Party (2021–)
Yukio Edano (age 60); Saitama Prefecture	Member of the House of Representatives (1993–); Chief Cabinet Secretary (2011); Minister of Economy, Trade and Industry (2011–12); President of the Constitutional Democratic Party (2017–21)
Yoshihiko Noda (age 67); Chiba Prefecture	Member of the House of Representatives (1993–96; 2000–); Minister of Finance (2010–11); Prime Minister of Japan (2011–12); Secretary-General of the Democratic Party (2016–17)
Harumi Yoshida (age 52); Tokyo	Member of the House of Representatives (2021–)

=== Sponsors ===
Kenta Izumi (20)	Yukio Edano (20)	Yoshihiko Noda (20)	Harumi Yoshida (21)
House of Representatives: Hiroshi Kawauchi; Takashi Kii; Daiki Michishita; Takashi Midorikawa; Hiroyuki Moriyama; Shinji Oguma; Kensuke Onishi; Atsushi Oshima; Shu Watanabe; Ryuichi Yoneyama; Tsunehiko Yoshida; House of Councillors: Michihiro Ishibashi; Yukihito Koga; Shinji Morimoto; Kyoko Murata; Makoto Oniki; Shinichi Shiba; Hideya Sugio; Masayo Tanabu; Eri Tokunaga	House of Representatives: Kaori Ishikawa; Hiroshi Kamiya; Masako Ōkawara; Shoichi Kondo; Kureha Otsuki; Mitsu Shimojo; Sō Watanabe; Issei Yamagishi; Hajime Yoshikawa; Michiyoshi Yunoki; House of Councillors: Tetsuro Fukuyama; Taiga Ishikawa; Kenji Katsube; Makiko Kishi; Chikage Koga; Hiroto Kumagai; Takashi Moriya; Maiko Tajima; Mari Takagi; Sakura Uchikoshi	House of Representatives: Yoichiro Aoyagi; Yamato Aoyama; Yutaka Banno; Hideshi Futori; Kentaro Genma; Satoshi Honjo; Shunsuke Ito; Sayuri Kamata; Makiko Kikuta; Takeshi Kozu; Toshikazu Morita; Katsuhito Nakajima; Kazuma Nakatani; Takeshi Noma; Hirofumi Ryu; Koji Sato; Kazuhiko Shigetoku; Manabu Terata; Kaname Tsutsumi; House of Councillors: Ai Aoki	House of Representatives: Masaharu Nakagawa; Tomoko Abe; Yutaka Arai; Kenji Eda; Akiko Okamoto; Soichiro Okuno; Takayuki Ochiai; Naoto Kan; Kōichirō Genba; Natsumi Sakai; Shu Sakurai; Yosuke Suzuki; Hajime Yatagawa; Makoto Yamazaki; Katsuhiko Yamada; Yuki Waseda; House of Councillors: Noriko Ishigaki; Masayoshi Okumura; Ryūhei Kawada; Hiroyuki Konishi; Ayaka Shiomura

=== Withdrew ===
- Kenji Eda, member of the House of Representatives (2002–03; 2005–) and former leader of the Japan Innovation Party (2014–15) – (endorsed Yoshida)
- Sumio Mabuchi, member of the House of Representatives (2003–17; 2019–) and former Minister of Land, Infrastructure, Transport and Tourism (2009–10) – (endorsed Izumi)

=== Declined ===
- Chinami Nishimura, member of the House of Representatives (2003–12; 2014–) and former secretary-general of the Constitutional Democratic Party (2021–22)
- Junya Ogawa, member of the House of Representatives (2005–) – (endorsed Noda)
- Kazuhiko Shigetoku, member of the House of Representatives (2012–) – (endorsed Noda)

== Contest ==
In mid-July, Izumi confirmed his intention to seek another term as president. With dissatisfaction widespread, his re-election was not assured, and speculation surrounded a likely challenge. The most widespread name was former president Yukio Edano. Many party members, dissatisfied with Izumi's performance and believing Edano discredited by his past failures, sought a younger or female candidate, but expressed frustration at the lack of talent within the party. Other names included Yoshihiko Noda, Kazuhiko Shigetoku, Sumio Mabuchi, and Kenji Eda. Junya Ogawa and Kiyomi Tsujimoto were also floated as candidates but lacked support.

Edano became the first candidate to announce his candidacy on 9 August, well in advance of nominations. He stated his platform was "human-centered economics," investing in social security, education, regional development and raising wages. Hoping to win support from Rengo, he also softened his position on nuclear power and called for a review of the party's electoral alliance strategy.

Despite strong backing from his own faction to run, on 19 August Shigetoku unexpectedly called on Noda to run instead. At a meeting of the Naoto Kan faction on 22 August, Kan proposed supporting Chinami Nishimura, fourth-place finisher from the 2021 race. Nishimura was cautious and suggested it would be difficult for her, as deputy president, to run against the incumbent Izumi. Additionally, some members of the faction had already thrown their support behind Edano.

A candidate information session was held on 26 August, two weeks before nominations were to be taken. Edano, Noda, Izumi, Eda, Mabuchi, and Nishimura were present, as was first-term legislator Harumi Yoshida. Despite her inexperience, Yoshida was well known for defeating LDP secretary-general Nobuteru Ishihara in her district. She said she wanted to bring a perspective "untainted by Nagatachō" and that of "a woman closely connected to everyday life".

Noda announced on 29 August that he intended stand in the election. He advocated a "centrist conservative line" and closer ties to the DPFP and Nippon Ishin no Kai. He received strong support from Ichirō Ozawa, and they appeared together at a campaign rally on 12 September. Ozawa had helped Izumi win the presidency in 2021, but by July of 2024 was publicly calling for his resignation. The Noda–Ozawa alliance was a major turnaround; the two had been longtime enemies since Ozawa instigated a major party split during Noda's tenure as prime minister. In the contest, they had common positions on cooperation with Nippon Ishin and opposing Izumi's leadership. Following the announcement, Junya Ogawa stated he had been considering running but was standing aside in favour of "his mentor" Noda.

With nominations looming, Edano and Noda had secured enough sponsors to run, while Izumi and other candidates were still struggling. At a faction meeting on 4 September, Nishimura declared that she would not stand. Mabuchi also withdrew the following day, citing the division of conservative support between himself, Izumi, and Eda. The following day, Izumi announced he had reached the threshold and formally launched his bid. He said: "Although I'm the current president, I want to enter the debate as a challenger." He advocated raising taxes on the wealthy and implementing free education. Shortly afterwards, Eda agreed to drop out and throw his support behind Yoshida. This put her above the threshold for nominations and she was able to stand as the fourth candidate in the race.

A key issue in the contest was the electoral alliance with the Communist Party. Izumi had retained the arrangement during his tenure while attempting to steer a middle course and expand cooperation with the DPFP. While much of the liberal wing favoured the alliance, it was opposed by large sections of the party as well as the trade union federation Rengo, one of the party's key support groups. Noda and Ozawa called for the party to shift to cooperation with the DPFP and Nippon Ishin instead. Noda stated: "If we can progress from that relationship of dialogue to cooperation, and if we can push the LDP and Komeito out of their majority, there will be many combinations (types of cooperation) that can be made." Edano, a supporter of the JCP alliance, suggested forming alliances on an individual basis in each district, taking into consideration the local political situation.

Surveys conducted during the campaign found Noda ahead among Diet members and with a wide lead in public opinion, while Edano was believed to have an advantage among local assembly members. Izumi and Yoshida both trailed. A survey of prefectural branches by the Sankei Shimbun found roughly equal support for Izumi (nine branches) and Noda and Edano (eight each), while three supported Yoshida and nineteen did not respond. Two days before the vote, Kyodo News assessed the situation as such: Noda was in the lead with support from his and Ozawa's factions, as well as Takeshi Shina and Yuichi Goto; the majority of Edano's support came from the Sanctuary faction; Yoshida had the backing of Eda's camp but struggled to expand; and Izumi was supported by Mabuchi's faction. A runoff between Noda and Edano was the most likely outcome.

== Timeline ==
- 17 July – Kenta Izumi announces he will seek re-election.
- 7 August – Party officials announce that the election will be held on 23 September.
- 9 August – Yukio Edano announces his bid.
- 19 August – Kazuhiko Shigetoku calls for Yoshihiko Noda to run.
- 21 August – Edano launches his campaign.
- 26 August – Information session attended by Edano, Noda, Izumi, Chinami Nishimura, Sumio Mabuchi, Kenji Eda, and Harumi Yoshida.
- 29 August – Noda announces his bid.
- 3 September – Noda launches his campaign.
- 4 September – Nishimura withdraws.
- 5 September – Mabuchi withdraws.
- 6 September – Izumi launches his campaign; Eda withdraws.
- 7 September – Yoshida launches her campaign. Date of nominations; campaign officially begins. Press conference and debate held.
- 20 September – Deadline for members, supporters, and local assembly officials to vote by mail.
- 22 September – Deadline for members, supporters, and local assembly officials to vote online.
- 23 September – Counting of member and local assembly votes; Diet MPs and candidates vote. Runoff is held; election result announced.

== Opinion polls ==
=== Public support ===
(Figures in parentheses are approval ratings of Constitutional Democratic Party supporters)

Fieldwork date	Polling firm	Sample size	Yoshihiko Noda	Yukio Edano	Kenta Izumi	Harumi Yoshida	Kenji Eda	Sumio Mabuchi	Chinami Nishimura	Junya Ogawa	Seiji Osaka	Others	NOT/ UD/NA
21–22 Sep 2024	ANN	1,012	39	18	9	8	–	–	–	–	–	–	26
21 Sep 2024	SSRC	2,044	30 (58)	10 (18)	5 (9)	6 (11)	–	–	–	–	–	–	49 (4)
15–16 Sep 2024	Kyodo News	N/A	(58.8)	(20.9)	(7.6)	(7.8)	–	–	–	–	–	–	(4.8)
14–15 Sep 2024	go2senkyo/JX	992	38.1	11.4	6.1	9.5	–	–	–	–	–	–	34.9
14–15 Sep 2024	Sankei/FNN	1,012	30.8	15.3	7.3	6.3	–	–	–	–	–	–	40.3
14–15 Sep 2024	go2senkyo/JX	N/A	38.1 (53.9)	11.4 (22.7)	6.1 (7.1)	9.5 (7.8)	–	–	–	–	–	–	34.9 (8.5)
14–15 Sep 2024	Asahi	1,070	29	15	6	5	–	–	–	–	–	–	45
13–15 Sep 2024	Nikkei/TV Tokyo	902	40 (58)	18	9	6	–	–	–	–	–	–	27
13–15 Sep 2024	Yomiuri/NNN	1,040	32	14	8	9	–	–	–	–	–	–	37 (Note: None of these: 12%; Don't know: 25%)
7–8 Sep 2024	JNN	1,011	30.9 (53.3)	11.3 (17.9)	9.7 (8.1)	7.1 (6.5)	–	–	–	–	–	–	41 (14.2)
6–9 Sep 2024	Jiji Press	1,170	27.5 (46.8)	14.5 (23.4)	8.5 (14.9)	3 (4.3)	–	–	–	–	–	–	46.5 (Note: None of these: 11.6%; Don't know: 32.3%) (10.6)
6–8 Sep 2024	NHK	1,220	35.3	14.4	9	5.6	4.9	–	–	–	–	–	30.7 (Note: None of these: 8.1%; Don't know: 22.6%)
7 Sep 2024	Nomination period closes. Official campaign period begins.												
31 Aug – 1 Sep 2024	go2senkyo	1,000	15.4	9.2	3.8	0.9	1.6	1.1	–	–	–	–	68
24–25 Aug 2024	SSRC	1,752	21	13	5	–	2	1	1	–	–	1	55
24–25 Aug 2024	ANN	1,015	27	14	9	–	4	2	–	1	–	–	43
24–25 Aug 2024	Mainichi	950	27 (32)	14 (37)	7 (6)	–	4 (6)	2	2	–	–	19	24
24–25 Aug 2024	Sankei/FNN	1,017 (Note: 42.8% of respondents indicated an interest in the CDP presidential race and answered the related question.)	20.1 (37.8)	16.4 (36.1)	6.6 (9.5)	–	2.5 (6)	2.1 (0.4)	1.2 (0.6)	1.2 (1.1)	–	–	50 (8.5)
23–25 Aug 2024	Yomiuri/NNN	1,056	25	15	8	–	3	3	–	3	–	–	43 (Note: None of these: 15%)
17–18 Aug 2024	go2senkyo/JX	987	22.8	10.6	10.7	–	2.2	–	–	2.7	–	14.9 (Note: Akira Nagatsuma: 4.1%; Kiyomi Tsujimoto: 3%; Kazuhiko Shigetoku: 0.2%; Others: 7.6%)	36
2–5 Aug 2024	Jiji Press	1,194	14.9	14.6	9.3	–	–	–	–	–	–	–	61.2
15 May – 6 Jun 2024	go2senkyo/JX	984	19.2	8.4	11.4	–	2	1.3	0.5	1.5	1.3	11.1	43.3

=== CDP Diet members ===
Fieldwork date	Polling firm	Sample size	Yoshihiko Noda	Yukio Edano	Kenta Izumi	Harumi Yoshida	UD/NA
21 September	Kyodo News	136	43	30	22	21	20
20 September	NTV	136	~40	~30	~20	~20	>20
19 September	Jiji Press	136	~40	~30	~25	~20	~25
18 September	FNN	136	~40	~30	~20	~20	~30
15–16 September	Kyodo News	136	>40	~30	~20	~20	~25
15 September	Sankei	136	37	25	21	17	36
13 September	Yomiuri	136	35	24	17	15	45

== Results ==
The election was held on 23 September. The votes of party members and supporters, as well as local assembly officials, were counted and reported. Diet members and approved candidates then cast their votes. In the first round, Noda placed first with 267 points, followed by Edano on 206, Izumi on 143, and Yoshida on 122. Noda clearly won the party member vote with 44% compared to Edano's 28%, while Edano was preferred by local assembly members 38% to 31%. 39% of approved Diet candidates voted for Noda followed by 26% for Izumi. 45 Diet members backed Noda, 33 Edano, 29 Izumi, and 28 Yoshida.

With no candidate reaching a majority, a runoff was then held. In the runoff, Noda won the votes of Diet members 72 to 63, candidates 60 to 35, and the prefectural branches 28 to 19, delivering him 232 points to Edano's 180.

=== First round ===
Candidate	Diet members			Party members & supporters			Local assembly members			Diet candidates			Total
Candidate	Votes	%	Points	Votes	%	Points	Votes	%	Points	Votes	%	Points	Total
Yoshihiko Noda	45	33.3	90	24,087	43.6	81	348	31.2	58	38	38.8	38	267
Yukio Edano	33	24.4	66	15,459	28.0	52	426	38.2	71	17	17.3	17	206
Kenta Izumi	29	21.5	58	7,932	14.4	26	200	17.9	33	26	26.5	26	143
Harumi Yoshida	28	20.7	56	7,776	14.1	26	141	12.6	23	17	17.3	17	122
Total	135	100.0	270	55,254	100.0	185	1,115	100.0	185	98	100.0	98	738
Invalid	0			493			0			0			
Turnout	135	99.3		55,747	48.6		1,115	90.2		98	100.0		
Eligible	136			114,792			1,236			98			
Source: CDP

=== Runoff ===
Candidate	Diet members			Diet candidates			Prefectural representatives			Total
Candidate	Votes	%	Points	Votes	%	Points	Votes	%	Points	Total
Yoshihiko Noda 当	72	53.3	144	60	63.2	60	28	59.6	28	232
Yukio Edano	63	46.7	126	35	36.8	35	19	40.4	19	180
Total	135	100.0	270	95	100.0	95	47	100.0	47	412
Invalid	0			0			0			
Turnout	135	99.3		95	96.9		47	100.0		
Eligible	136			98			47			
Source: CDP

== See also ==
- 2024 Liberal Democratic Party (Japan) presidential election
