= Next Cabinet of Yoshihiko Noda =

Former de facto shadow cabinet of Japan

Next Cabinet of Yoshihiko Noda Japanese: 野田佳彦「次の内閣」
- De facto shadow cabinet of Japan
- 23 September 2024 – 9 February 2026
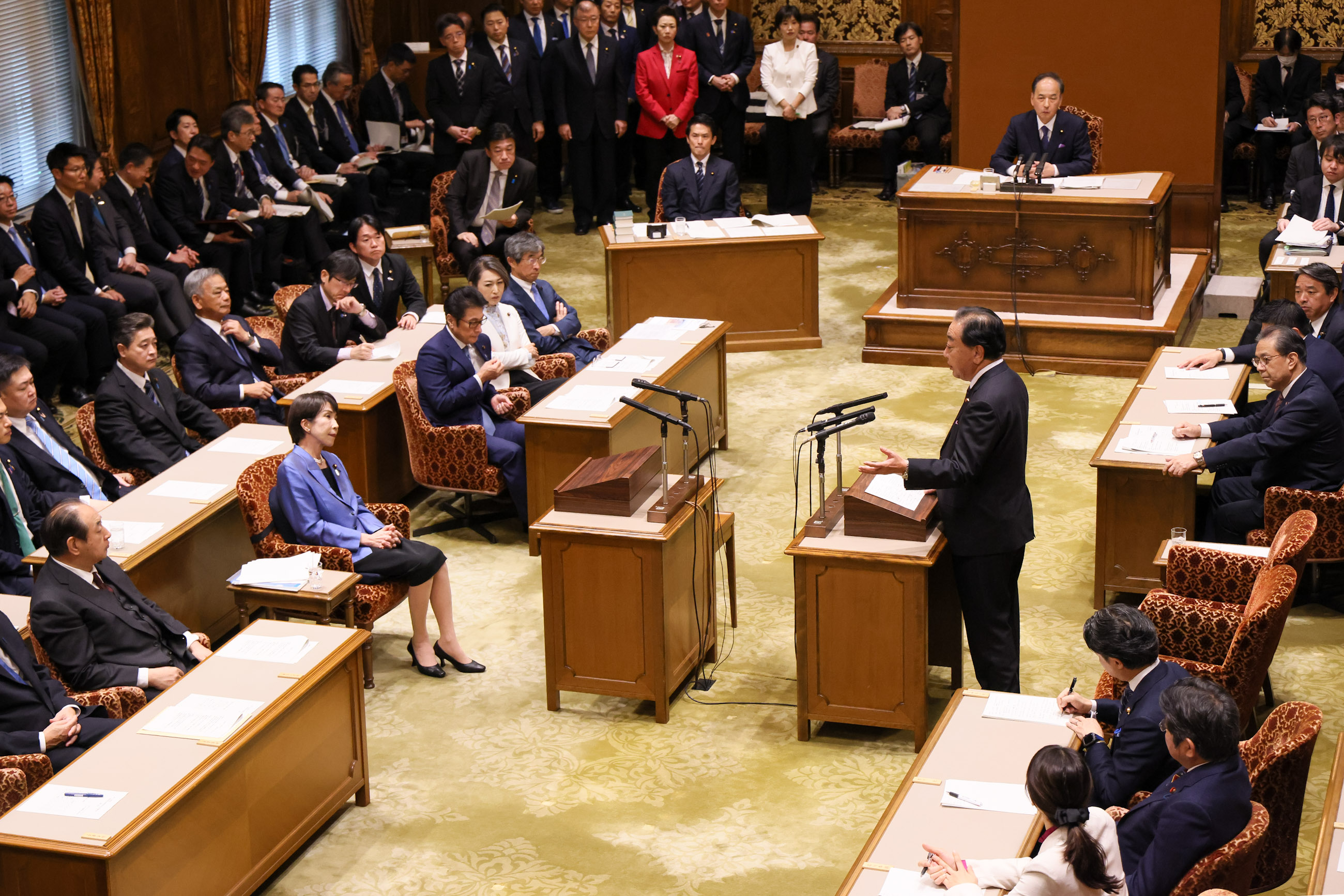
- Noda during a session of Question Time in November 2025
- Date formed: 23 September 2024
- Date dissolved: 9 February 2026

People and organisations
- Emperor: Naruhito
- Leader of the Opposition: Yoshihiko Noda
- Shadow Chief Cabinet Secretary: Kazuhiko Shigetoku (Sep 2024 – Sep 2025); Satoshi Honjo (Sep 2025 – Feb 2026)
- Member party: Constitutional Democratic; (HoR until 2026): Centrist Reform Alliance; (HoR since 2026)

History
- Election: 2024
- Legislature terms: 2021 (HoR); 2024 (HoR); 2022 (HoC); 2025 (HoC)
- Predecessor: Next Cabinet of Kenta Izumi

Yoshihiko Noda assumed the position of President of the Constitutional Democratic Party of Japan after being elected to the position on 23 September 2024, beating party founder Yukio Edano, incumbent president Kenta Izumi, and freshman lawmaker Harumi Yoshida after the expiration of Izumi's three-year mandate. Noda appointed his Next Cabinet on 30 September 2024. As of November 2025, there have been two minor reshuffles in November 2024 and August 2025, and one major reshuffle in September 2025; it has shadowed the Ishiba I, Ishiba II, and Takaichi cabinets since its formation. The CDP merged with Komeito in the House of Representatives in January 2026, forming the Centrist Reform Alliance. The Cabinet dissolved following Noda's resignation as CRA co-leader on 9 February 2026, which was prompted by the party's dismal result in the 2026 general election.

== Shadow Cabinet ==
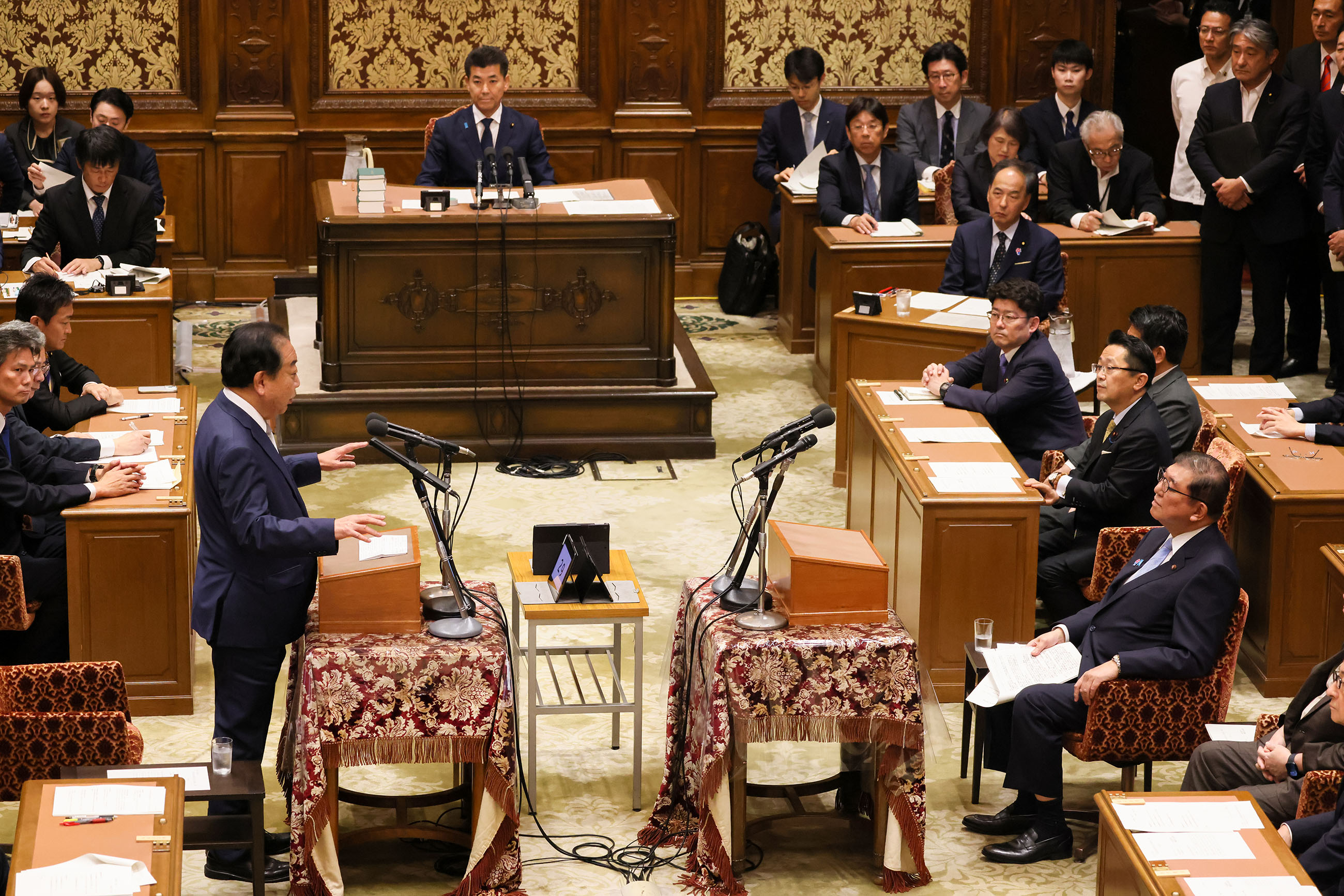
Noda during a session of Question Time in June 2025.

Key
Sits in the House of Representatives
Sits in the House of Councillors

=== September 2025 – February 2026 ===
Next Cabinet of the Constitutional Democratic Party of Japan
Portfolio	Shadow Minister	Constituency	Term
Shadow cabinet ministers
Shadow Prime Minister; President of the Constitutional Democratic Party; Leader of the Opposition	Yoshihiko Noda	Chiba 14th	Sep 2024 – Feb 2026
Shadow Chief Cabinet Secretary; CDP Policy Bureau Chairman	Satoshi Honjo	Chiba 8th	Sep 2025 – Feb 2026
Shadow Minister of Internal Affairs and Communications	Ikuo Yamahana	Tokyo 22nd	Sep 2025 – Feb 2026
Shadow Minister of Justice; Shadow Minister in Charge of Foreign Nationals and Immigration	Takahiro Kuroiwa	Niigata 3rd	Sep 2025 – Feb 2026
Shadow Minister for Foreign Affairs; Shadow Minister in charge of the Abductions Issue	Kentaro Genma	Shizuoka 8th	Sep 2025 – Feb 2026
Shadow Minister of Finance	Shuji Inatomi	Fukuoka 2nd	Sep 2025 – Feb 2026
Shadow Minister of Education, Culture, Sports, Science and Technology	Yutaka Arai	Hokkaido 3rd	Sep 2025 – Feb 2026
Shadow Minister of Health, Labour and Welfare	Hiroyuki Konishi	Chiba at-large	Sep 2025 – Feb 2026
Shadow Minister of Agriculture, Forestry and Fisheries	Hiroshi Kamiya	Hokkaido 10th	Sep 2025 – Feb 2026
Shadow Minister of Economy, Trade and Industry	Yukihito Koga	Fukuoka at-large	Sep 2025 – Feb 2026
Shadow Minister of Land, Infrastructure, Transport and Tourism	Yoichi Shiraishi	Saitama 7th	Sep 2025 – Feb 2026
Shadow Minister of the Environment	Toshikazu Morita	Saitama 12th	Sep 2025 – Feb 2026
Shadow Minister of Defense	Go Shinohara	Kanagawa 1st	Sep 2025 – Feb 2026
Shadow Minister of State for the Cabinet; Shadow Minister of State for Disaster Management; Shadow Chairman of the National Public Safety Commission	Hiroyuki Moriyama	Kinki PR	Sep 2025 – Feb 2026
Shadow Minister of State for Okinawa and Northern Territories Affairs; Shadow Minister in charge of Digital Administrative and Fiscal Reforms; Shadow Minister in charge of Administrative Reform; Shadow Minister in charge of Civil Service Reform	Hiroshi Kawauchi	Kyushu PR	Sep 2025 – Feb 2026
Shadow Minister of State for Policies Related to Children, Declining Birthrate, Youth Empowerment, and Gender Equality	Natsumi Sakai	Tokyo 15th	Sep 2025 – Feb 2026
Shadow Minister of Reconstruction; Shadow Minister in charge of Comprehensive Policy Coordination for Revival from the Nuclear Accident at Fukushima	Sayuri Kamata	Miyagi 2nd	Sep 2025 – Feb 2026
Shadow Minister for Digital Transformation; Shadow Minister of State for Regional Revitalization	Makiko Kishi	National PR	Sep 2025 – Feb 2026
Shadow Deputy Chief Cabinet Secretary	Takashi Kii	Fukuoka 10th	Sep 2025 – Feb 2026
Shadow Deputy Chief Cabinet Secretary	Eri Tokunaga	Hokkaido at-large	Sep 2025 – Feb 2026
Shadow Deputy Chief Cabinet Secretary	Tatsumaru Yamaoka	Hokkaido 9th	Sep 2025 – Feb 2026
Shadow Deputy Chief Cabinet Secretary	Nobuhiko Isaka	Hyōgo 1st	Sep 2025 – Feb 2026

=== August 2025 – September 2025 ===
Next Cabinet of the Constitutional Democratic Party of Japan
Portfolio	Shadow Minister	Constituency	Term
Shadow cabinet ministers
Shadow Prime Minister; President of the Constitutional Democratic Party; Leader of the Opposition	Yoshihiko Noda	Chiba 14th	Sep 2024 – present
Shadow Chief Cabinet Secretary; CDP Policy Bureau Chairman	Kazuhiko Shigetoku	Aichi 12th	Sep 2024 – Sep 2025
Shadow Minister of State for the Cabinet; Shadow Minister of State for Disaster Management; Shadow Chairman of the National Public Safety Commission	Hideya Sugio	Nagasaki at-large	Sep 2022 – Sep 2025 (Note: Assumed new portfolios in Sep 2024.)
Shadow Minister of Internal Affairs and Communications	Hajime Yoshikawa	Kyushu PR	Aug 2025 – Sep 2025
Shadow Minister of Justice	Sakura Uchikoshi	Niigata at-large	Sep 2024 – Sep 2025
Shadow Minister for Foreign Affairs; Shadow Minister in charge of the Abductions Issue	Koichi Takemasa	Northern Kanto PR	Nov 2024 – Sep 2025
Shadow Minister of Finance	Takeshi Shina	Iwate 1st	Sep 2022 – Sep 2025
Shadow Minister of Education, Culture, Sports, Science and Technology	Keisuke Tsumura	Chūgoku PR	Aug 2025 – Sep 2025
Shadow Minister of Health, Labour and Welfare	Kazunori Yamanoi	Kyoto 6th	Sep 2024 – Sep 2025
Shadow Minister of Agriculture, Forestry and Fisheries	Emi Kaneko	Fukushima 1st	Sep 2022 – Sep 2025
Shadow Minister of Economy, Trade and Industry	Kaname Tajima	Chiba 1st	Sep 2022 – Sep 2025
Shadow Minister of Land, Infrastructure, Transport and Tourism	Yasuko Komiyama	Saitama 7th	Sep 2022 – Sep 2025
Shadow Minister of the Environment	Takashi Shinohara	Nagano 1st	Nov 2024 – Sep 2025
Shadow Minister of Security (Note: Replacing the Minister of Defense.)	Go Shinohara	Kanagawa 1st	Aug 2025 – Sep 2025
Shadow Minister of State for Gender Equality; Shadow Minister in Charge of a Cohesive Society; Shadow Minister in Charge of Measures for Loneliness and Isolation	Harumi Yoshida	Tokyo 8th	Sep 2024 – Sep 2025
Shadow Minister for Digital Transformation; Shadow Minister in charge of Digital Administrative and Fiscal Reforms; Shadow Minister in charge of Administrative Reform; Shadow Minister in charge of Civil Service Reform	Kazuma Nakatani	Kanagawa 7th	Nov 2024 – Sep 2025
Shadow Minister of Reconstruction; Shadow Minister in charge of Comprehensive Policy Coordination for Revival from the Nuclear Accident at Fukushima	Akiko Okamoto	Miyagi 1st	Sep 2024 – Sep 2025
Shadow Minister of State for Policies Related to Children	Mari Takagi	Saitama at-large	Nov 2024 – Sep 2025
Shadow Minister for Economic and Fiscal Policy	Sumio Mabuchi	Nara 1st	Sep 2024 – Sep 2025
Shadow Minister of State for Okinawa and Northern Territories Affairs; Shadow Minister for Consumer Affairs and Food Safety; Shadow Minister of State for Regional Revitalization	Kaori Ishikawa	Hokkaido 11th	Sep 2024 – Sep 2025
Shadow Chairman of the Tax Commission	Kensuke Onishi	Aichi 13th	Sep 2024 – Sep 2025
Shadow Chairman of the Constitution Research Council	Ikuo Yamahana	Tokyo 22nd	Nov 2024 – Sep 2025

=== November 2024 – August 2025 ===
Next Cabinet of the Constitutional Democratic Party of Japan
Portfolio	Shadow Minister	Constituency	Term
Shadow cabinet ministers
Shadow Prime Minister; President of the Constitutional Democratic Party; Leader of the Opposition	Yoshihiko Noda	Chiba 14th	Sep 2024 – present
Shadow Chief Cabinet Secretary; CDP Policy Bureau Chairman	Kazuhiko Shigetoku	Aichi 12th	Sep 2024 – Sep 2025
Shadow Minister of State for the Cabinet; Shadow Minister of State for Disaster Management; Shadow Chairman of the National Public Safety Commission	Hideya Sugio	Nagasaki at-large	Sep 2022 – Sep 2025
Shadow Minister of Internal Affairs and Communications	Kuniyoshi Noda	Fukuoka at-large	Sep 2022 – Aug 2025
Shadow Minister of Justice	Sakura Uchikoshi	Niigata at-large	Sep 2024 – Sep 2025
Shadow Minister for Foreign Affairs; Shadow Minister in charge of the Abductions Issue	Koichi Takemasa	Northern Kanto PR	Nov 2024 – Sep 2025
Shadow Minister of Finance	Takeshi Shina	Iwate 1st	Sep 2022 – Sep 2025
Shadow Minister of Education, Culture, Sports, Science and Technology	Yoshio Maki	Aichi 4th	Sep 2024 – Aug 2025
Shadow Minister of Health, Labour and Welfare	Kazunori Yamanoi	Kyoto 6th	Sep 2024 – Sep 2025
Shadow Minister of Agriculture, Forestry and Fisheries	Emi Kaneko	Fukushima 1st	Sep 2022 – Sep 2025
Shadow Minister of Economy, Trade and Industry	Kaname Tajima	Chiba 1st	Sep 2022 – Sep 2025
Shadow Minister of Land, Infrastructure, Transport and Tourism	Yasuko Komiyama	Saitama 7th	Sep 2022 – Sep 2025
Shadow Minister of the Environment	Takashi Shinohara	Nagano 1st	Nov 2024 – Sep 2025
Shadow Minister of Security	Tetsuro Fukuyama	Kyoto at-large	Sep 2024 – Aug 2025
Shadow Minister of State for Gender Equality; Shadow Minister in Charge of a Cohesive Society; Shadow Minister in Charge of Measures for Loneliness and Isolation	Harumi Yoshida	Tokyo 8th	Sep 2024 – Sep 2025
Shadow Minister for Digital Transformation; Shadow Minister in charge of Digital Administrative and Fiscal Reforms; Shadow Minister in charge of Administrative Reform; Shadow Minister in charge of Civil Service Reform	Kazuma Nakatani	Kanagawa 7th	Nov 2024 – Sep 2025
Shadow Minister of Reconstruction; Shadow Minister in charge of Comprehensive Policy Coordination for Revival from the Nuclear Accident at Fukushima	Akiko Okamoto	Miyagi 1st	Sep 2024 – Sep 2025
Shadow Minister of State for Policies Related to Children	Mari Takagi	Saitama at-large	Nov 2024 – Sep 2025
Shadow Minister for Economic and Fiscal Policy	Sumio Mabuchi	Nara 1st	Sep 2024 – Sep 2025
Shadow Minister of State for Okinawa and Northern Territories Affairs; Shadow Minister for Consumer Affairs and Food Safety; Shadow Minister of State for Regional Revitalization	Kaori Ishikawa	Hokkaido 11th	Sep 2024 – Sep 2025
Shadow Chairman of the Tax Commission	Kensuke Onishi	Aichi 13th	Sep 2024 – Sep 2025
Shadow Chairman of the Constitution Research Council	Seiji Osaka	Hokkaido 8th	Sep 2024 – Nov 2024
Shadow Chairman of the Constitution Research Council	Ikuo Yamahana	Tokyo 22nd	Nov 2024 – Sep 2025

=== September 2024 – November 2024 ===
Next Cabinet of the Constitutional Democratic Party of Japan
Portfolio	Shadow Minister	Constituency	Term
Shadow cabinet ministers
Shadow Prime Minister; President of the Constitutional Democratic Party; Leader of the Opposition	Yoshihiko Noda	Chiba 4th	Sep 2024 – present
Shadow Chief Cabinet Secretary; CDP Policy Bureau Chairman	Kazuhiko Shigetoku	Aichi 12th	Sep 2024 – Sep 2025
Shadow Minister of State for the Cabinet; Shadow Minister of State for Disaster Management; Shadow Chairman of the National Public Safety Commission	Hideya Sugio	Nagasaki at-large	Sep 2022 – Sep 2025
Shadow Minister of Internal Affairs and Communications	Kuniyoshi Noda	Fukuoka at-large	Sep 2022 – Aug 2025
Shadow Minister of Justice	Sakura Uchikoshi	Niigata at-large	Sep 2024 – Sep 2025
Shadow Minister for Foreign Affairs; Shadow Minister in charge of the Abductions Issue	Shu Watanabe	Tokai PR	Sep 2024 – Nov 2024
Shadow Minister of Finance	Takeshi Shina	Iwate 1st	Sep 2022 – Sep 2025
Shadow Minister of Education, Culture, Sports, Science and Technology	Yoshio Maki	Tokai PR	Sep 2024 – Aug 2025
Shadow Minister of Health, Labour and Welfare	Kazunori Yamanoi	Kyoto 6th	Sep 2024 – Sep 2025
Shadow Minister of Agriculture, Forestry and Fisheries	Emi Kaneko	Fukushima 1st	Sep 2022 – Sep 2025
Shadow Minister of Economy, Trade and Industry	Kaname Tajima	Chiba 1st	Sep 2022 – Sep 2025
Shadow Minister of Land, Infrastructure, Transport and Tourism	Yasuko Komiyama	Northern Kanto PR	Sep 2022 – Sep 2025
Shadow Minister of the Environment	Shoichi Kondo	Aichi 3rd	Sep 2022 – Nov 2024
Shadow Minister of Security	Tetsuro Fukuyama	Kyoto at-large	Sep 2024 – Aug 2025
Shadow Minister of State for Gender Equality; Shadow Minister in Charge of a Cohesive Society; Shadow Minister in Charge of Measures for Loneliness and Isolation	Harumi Yoshida	Tokyo 8th	Sep 2024 – Sep 2025
Shadow Minister for Digital Transformation; Shadow Minister in charge of Digital Administrative and Fiscal Reforms; Shadow Minister in charge of Administrative Reform; Shadow Minister in charge of Civil Service Reform	Hiroe Makiyama	Kanagawa at-large	Sep 2024 – Nov 2024
Shadow Minister of Reconstruction; Shadow Minister in charge of Comprehensive Policy Coordination for Revival from the Nuclear Accident at Fukushima	Akiko Okamoto	Tōhoku PR	Sep 2024 – Sep 2025
Shadow Minister of State for Policies Related to Children	Chinami Nishimura	Niigata 1st	Sep 2024 – Nov 2024
Shadow Minister for Economic and Fiscal Policy	Sumio Mabuchi	Kinki PR	Sep 2024 – Sep 2025
Shadow Minister of State for Okinawa and Northern Territories Affairs; Shadow Minister for Consumer Affairs and Food Safety; Shadow Minister of State for Regional Revitalization	Kaori Ishikawa	Hokkaido 11th	Sep 2024 – Sep 2025
Shadow Chairman of the Tax Commission	Kensuke Onishi	Aichi 13th	Sep 2024 – Sep 2025
Shadow Chairman of the Constitution Research Council	Seiji Osaka	Hokkaido 8th	Sep 2024 – Nov 2024
