= 2021 Constitutional Democratic Party of Japan presidential election =

Political party leadership elections in Japan

- 30 November 2021

572 points in the 1st round (287 for a majority) 333 points in the runoff (167 for a majority)
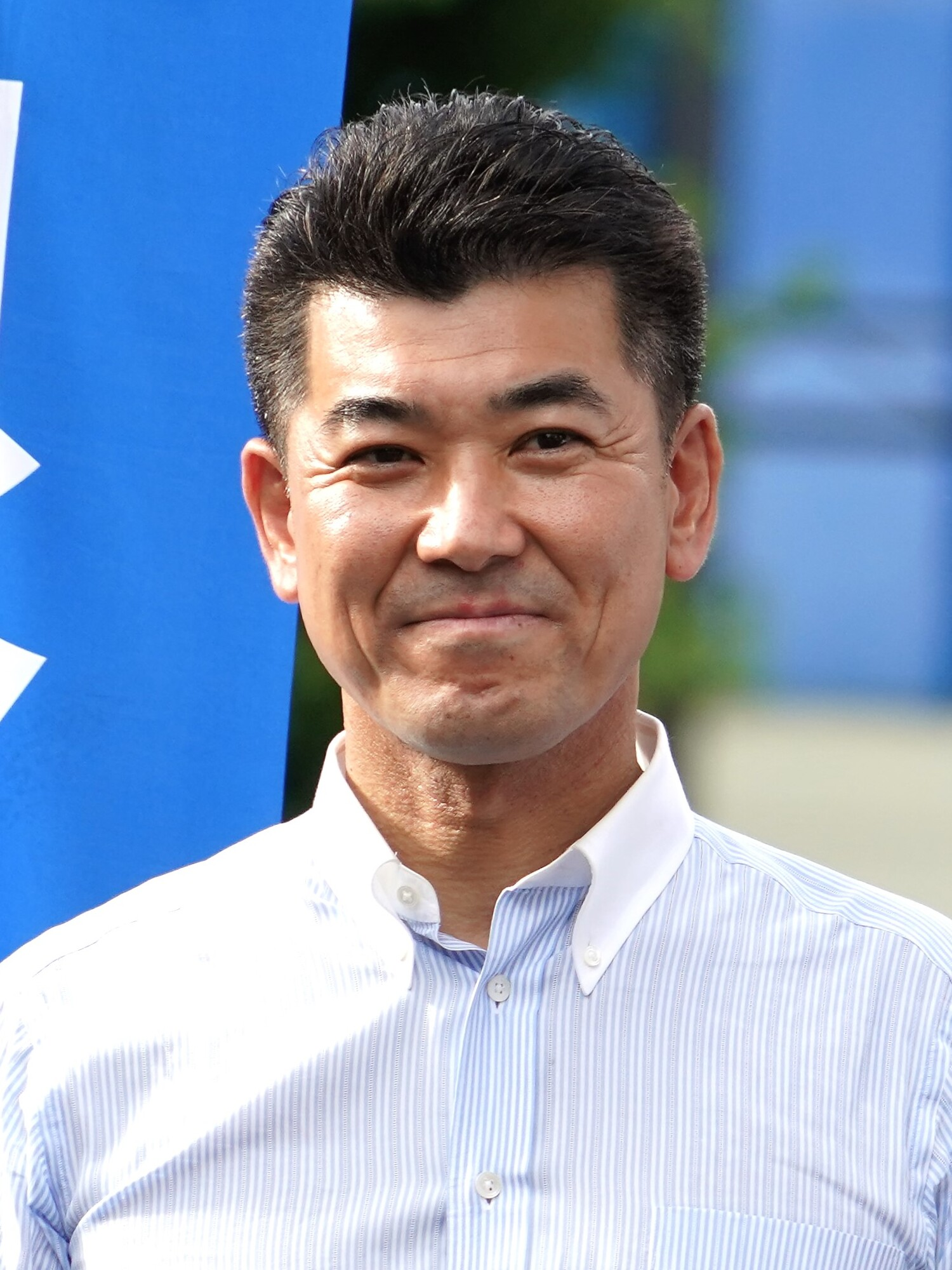

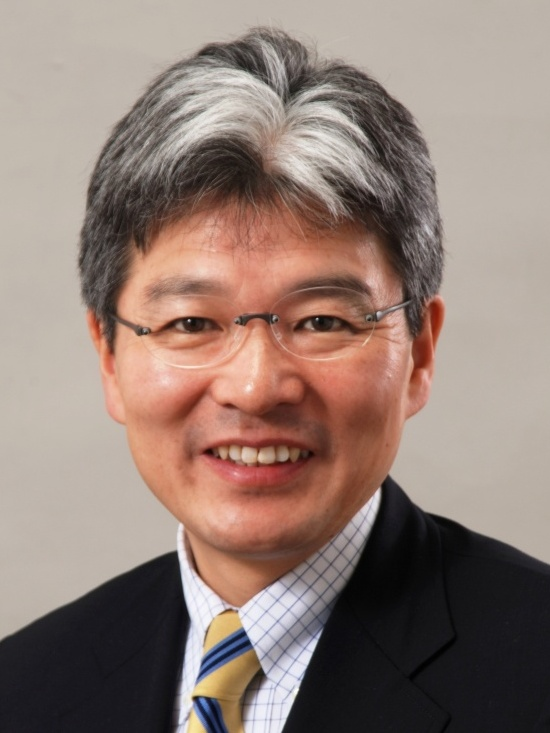

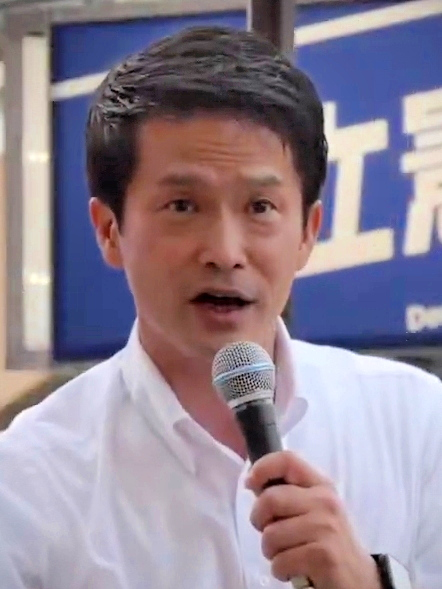

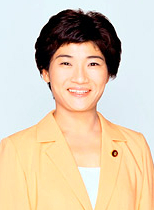
Candidate	Kenta Izumi	Seiji Osaka
Leader's seat	Kyoto 3rd	Hokkaido 8th
First round	189 (33.0%)	148 (25.9%)
Runoff	205 (61.6%)	128 (38.4%)
Candidate	Junya Ogawa	Chinami Nishimura
Leader's seat	Kagawa 1st	Niigata 1st
First round	133 (23.3%)	102 (17.8%)
President before election
Yukio Edano
Elected President
Kenta Izumi

The 2021 Constitutional Democratic Party of Japan presidential election was held on 30 November 2021 following the resignation of president Yukio Edano after the party's poor performance in the 2021 general election. In a four-way race, Kenta Izumi was elected president after a runoff against Seiji Osaka.

== Background ==
Yukio Edano had been president of the Constitutional Democratic Party since its formation in 2017 and was re-elected in 2020 after the merger with the Democratic Party For the People which created the party's second incarnation. This merger gave the party more than 100 seats in the House of Representatives, making it the largest opposition party in the chamber since the Liberal Democratic Party returned to power in 2012. In September 2021, with an election looming, the CDP signed a common policy platform with the Japanese Communist Party, Social Democratic Party, and Reiwa Shinsengumi. On 13 October, the same four parties agreed to an electoral alliance for the upcoming House of Representatives election which had been called by new Prime Minister Fumio Kishida. Opinion polling and projections suggested the CDP and its allies would gain seats, but they ultimately went backwards, with the CDP winning only 96 seats compared to its 109 before the election. The Communist and Social Democratic parties likewise lost seats. Yukio Edano subsequently announced his resignation as party president.

== Electoral system ==
Candidates were required to gather sponsorships from 20 members of the CDP Diet caucus in order to stand; a maximum of 25 sponsors could be submitted.

The election was conducted via a points system:

- Each of the party's members of the National Diet had a vote worth two points. (280 points total)
- Registered party members (4,000 yen annual fee) or supporters (2,000 yen annual fee) could vote via mail or online. Points for this tier were awarded to candidates in proportion to votes won. (143 points total)
- Each of the party's members of local councils or prefectural assemblies could vote via mail or online. Points for this tier were awarded to candidates in proportion to votes won. (143 points total)
- Each of the party's approved candidates for future Diet elections had a vote worth one point. (6 points total)

In order to win, a candidate must secure more than 50% of points. If no candidate won more than 50%, a runoff was to be held the same day.

In the event of a runoff:

- Each of the party's members of the National Diet had a vote worth two points. (280 points total)
- Each of the party's approved candidates for future Diet elections had a vote worth one point. (6 points total)
- A representative from each of the party's prefectural branches had a vote worth one point. (47 points total)

Approximately 100,000 members and supporters were eligible to vote, as well as 1,270 local and prefecture-level officials.

== Candidates ==
Candidate	Offices held
Kenta Izumi (age 47); Kyoto Prefecture	Member of the House of Representatives (2003–); Parliamentary Secretary in the Cabinet Office (2009–10)
Seiji Osaka (age 62); Hokkaido	Member of the House of Representatives (2005–); Parliamentary Vice Minister for Internal Affairs and Communications (2010–11)
Junya Ogawa (age 50); Kagawa Prefecture	Member of the House of Representatives (2005–); Parliamentary Vice Minister for Internal Affairs and Communications (2009–10)
Chinami Nishimura (age 54); Niigata Prefecture	Member of the House of Representatives (2003–); Parliamentary Vice-Minister for Foreign Affairs (2009–10); Minister of State for Health, Labour and Welfare (2011–12)

=== Sponsors ===
Kenta Izumi (25)	Seiji Osaka (20)	Junya Ogawa (25)	Chinami Nishimura (20)
House of Representatives: Yamato Aoyama; Yutaka Arai; Akio Fukuda; Yuichi Goto; Nobuhiko Isaka; Takeshi Kozu; Sumio Mabuchi; Toshikazu Morita; Takeshi Noma; Koji Sato; Mitsu Shimojo; Go Shinohara; Yoshinori Suematsu; Seiichi Suetsugu; Hisashi Tokunaga; Katsuhiko Yamada; Kazunori Yamanoi; Tsunehiko Yoshida; House of Councillors: Jiro Hata; Eiji Kidoguchi; Yukihito Koga; Hiroe Makiyama; Shinji Morimoto; Masayo Tanabu; Takanori Yokosawa	House of Representatives: Kaori Ishikawa; Shoichi Kondo; Daiki Michishita; Kureha Otsuki; Kaname Tsutsumi; Tatsumaru Yamaoka; Michiyoshi Yunoki; House of Councillors: Yoshifu Arita; Takashi Esaki; Yoshio Hachiro; Shinkun Haku; Kenji Katsube; Makiko Kishi; Shunichi Mizuoka; Takashi Moriya; Masayoshi Nataniya; Masahito Ozawa; Yoshitaka Saitō; Maiko Tajima; Tadatomo Yoshida	House of Representatives: Yoichiro Aoyagi; Kentaro Genma; Shuji Inatomi; Shunsuke Ito; Sayuri Kamata; Makiko Kikuta; Kazuya Kondo; Katsuhito Nakajima; Kazuma Nakatani; Takayuki Ochiai; Hiroshi Ogushi; Soichiro Okuno; Shu Sakurai; Takeshi Shina; Yoichi Shiraishi; Yosuke Suzuki; Kaname Tajima; Manabu Terata; Yoshio Tezuka; Hajime Yatagawa; Shunji Yuhara; House of Councillors: Hiroyuki Konishi; Hiroyuki Nagahama; Kuniyoshi Noda; Ayaka Shiomura	House of Representatives: Tomoko Abe; Naoto Kan; Masako Ōkawara; Nobuhiro Koyama; Hiroyuki Moriyama; Masaharu Nakagawa; Akiko Okamoto; Takashi Shinohara; Yuki Waseda; Sō Watanabe; Makoto Yamazaki; Harumi Yoshida; House of Councillors: Michihiro Ishibashi; Noriko Ishigaki; Taiga Ishikawa; Ryūhei Kawada; Hiroto Kumagai; Yuichi Mayama; Hideya Sugio; Sakura Uchikoshi

=== Withdrew ===
- Hiroshi Ogushi, member of the House of Representatives (2005–) and former Special Advisor to the Prime Minister (2012) – (endorsed Ogawa)
- Sumio Mabuchi, member of the House of Representatives (2003–17; 2019–) and former Minister of Land, Infrastructure, Transport and Tourism (2010–11) – (endorsed Izumi)

=== Declined ===
- Kōichirō Genba, member of the House of Representatives (1993–) and former Minister for Foreign Affairs (2011–12)
- Kenji Eda, member of the House of Representatives (2002–02; 2005–) and former leader of the Japan Innovation Party (2014–15)

== Contest ==
There was no obvious successor after Edano's resignation and it took some time for the candidates to become clear. Initially, only Ogawa and Hiroshi Ogushi expressed clear interest in running. Other potential candidates such as Izumi and Nishimura kept their positions ambiguous until close to the date of nominations. On the 16th, Izumi announced his candidacy with the endorsement of his own faction. In response, Shoichi Kondo's liberal Sanctuary faction, the largest in the party, held a meeting to discuss the election. One of their own, Ogawa, already planned to run, but the faction judged him too inexperienced and instead elected to put forward Seiji Osaka as their candidate. Nishimura, backed by Naoto Kan's faction, announced her candidacy on the afternoon of the 17th. On the 18th, Takeshi Shina and Ichirō Ozawa's factions both decided to support Izumi. Ogawa, whose bid had nearly been sunk by his faction's support for Osaka, held a press conference that evening declaring he would still stand. He was able to secure enough sponsors to stand after winning endorsements from Yoshihiko Noda and fellow leadership hopeful Ogushi, who dropped out in his favour.

With four candidates running and no clear favourite, a runoff was widely expected. A survey conducted by the NHK up to the 26th indicated Izumi was in the lead, with support from about 40 Diet members compared to around 20 for the other three candidates. A Jiji Press survey reported similar figures: Izumi had around 40 Diet members in his camp, followed by Ogawa with 30, and Osaka and Nishimura in the mid-20s. Among prefectural branch leaders, fifteen supported Izumi, seven Osaka, Nishimura six, and Ogawa one. They reported that Izumi was favoured due to his communication skills, while Osaka's backers appreciated his administrative skills.

In the final days, speculation centered on who would advance to the runoff alongside Izumi; Ogawa was considered most likely. The Osaka and Nishimura camps approached him in order to coordinate against Izumi in the runoff. With this agreement, they estimated that Ogawa's support in a runoff at around 160 points versus 125 for Izumi.

== Timeline ==
- 2 November – Yukio Edano announces his resignation as party president.
- 13 November – Party officials announce the election will be held on 30 November 2021.
- 17 November – Kenta Izumi, Seiji Osaka and Chinami Nishimura announce their candidacies.
- 18 November – Junya Ogawa announces his candidacy.
- 19 November – Date of nominations; campaign officially begins.
- 22 November – The first of three public debate between the leadership candidates is held.
- 24 November – Second debate between the candidates.
- 25 November – Third debate between the candidates.
- 29 November – Deadline for members, supporters, and local assembly officials to vote.
- 30 November – Counting of member and local assembly votes; Diet MPs and candidates vote. Runoff is held; election result announced.

== Opinion polls ==
Fieldwork date	Polling firm	Sample size	Izumi	Osaka	Nishimura	Ogawa	Ogushi	Eda	Mabuchi	Genba	Renhō	Nagatsuma	Okada	Others	NOT/ UD/NA
20–21 Nov 2021	ANN	1,031	12	8	10	9	–	–	–	–	–	–	–	–	61
10–11 Nov 2021	Kyodo News	520	8.1	–	3.6	6.7	2.4	–	7.2	6.7	–	–	–	5.9	59.4
10–11 Nov 2021	Nikkei/TV Tokyo	852	3	2	–	6	1	4	4	4	14	11	7	–	44

== Results ==
An extraordinary party convention was held at a hotel in Tokyo on the afternoon of November 30. The votes of party members and supporters, as well as local assembly officials, were counted and reported. Diet members and approved candidates then cast their votes. In the first round, Izumi placed first with 189 points, followed by Osaka with 148, Ogawa with 133, and Nishimura with 102. As expected, Izumi came first, but no candidate secured a majority and a runoff thus took place. Unexpectedly, Ogawa fell short of making the runoff due to low support from local assembly officials, despite outperforming Osaka among Diet members. The previous plan for Ogawa, Osaka, and Nishimura's camps to coordinate in the runoff thus fell apart, and most of Ogawa's supporters switched to Izumi, delivering him a comfortable victory.

=== First round ===
Candidate	Diet members			Party members & supporters			Local assembly members			Diet candidates			Total
Candidate	Votes	%	Points	Votes	%	Points	Votes	%	Points	Votes	%	Points	Total
Kenta Izumi	47	33.6	94	15,200	32.9	47	369	31.9	46	2	33.3	2	189
Seiji Osaka	29	20.7	58	12,411	26.9	38	385	33.3	48	4	66.7	4	148
Junya Ogawa	36	25.7	72	10,912	23.6	34	219	18.9	27	0	0.0	0	133
Chinami Nishimura	28	20.0	56	7,666	16.6	24	183	15.8	22	0	0.0	0	102
Total	140	100.0	280	46,189	100.0	143	1,156	100.0	143	6	100.0	6	572
Invalid	0			559			?			0			
Turnout	140	100.0		46,439	46.3		?	?		6	100.0		
Eligible	140			100,267			1,270			6			
Source: CDP

=== Runoff ===
Candidate	Diet members			Diet candidates			Prefectural representatives			Total
Candidate	Votes	%	Points	Votes	%	Points	Votes	%	Points	Total
Kenta Izumi	84	60.0	168	2	33.3	2	35	74.5	35	205
Seiji Osaka	56	40.0	112	4	66.7	4	12	25.5	12	128
Total	140	100.0	280	6	100.0	6	47	100.0	47	333
Invalid	0			0			0			
Turnout	140	100.0		6	100.0		47	100.0		
Eligible	140			6			47			
Source: CDP
