= General Federation of Private Railway and Bus Workers' Unions of Japan =

Trade union in Japan

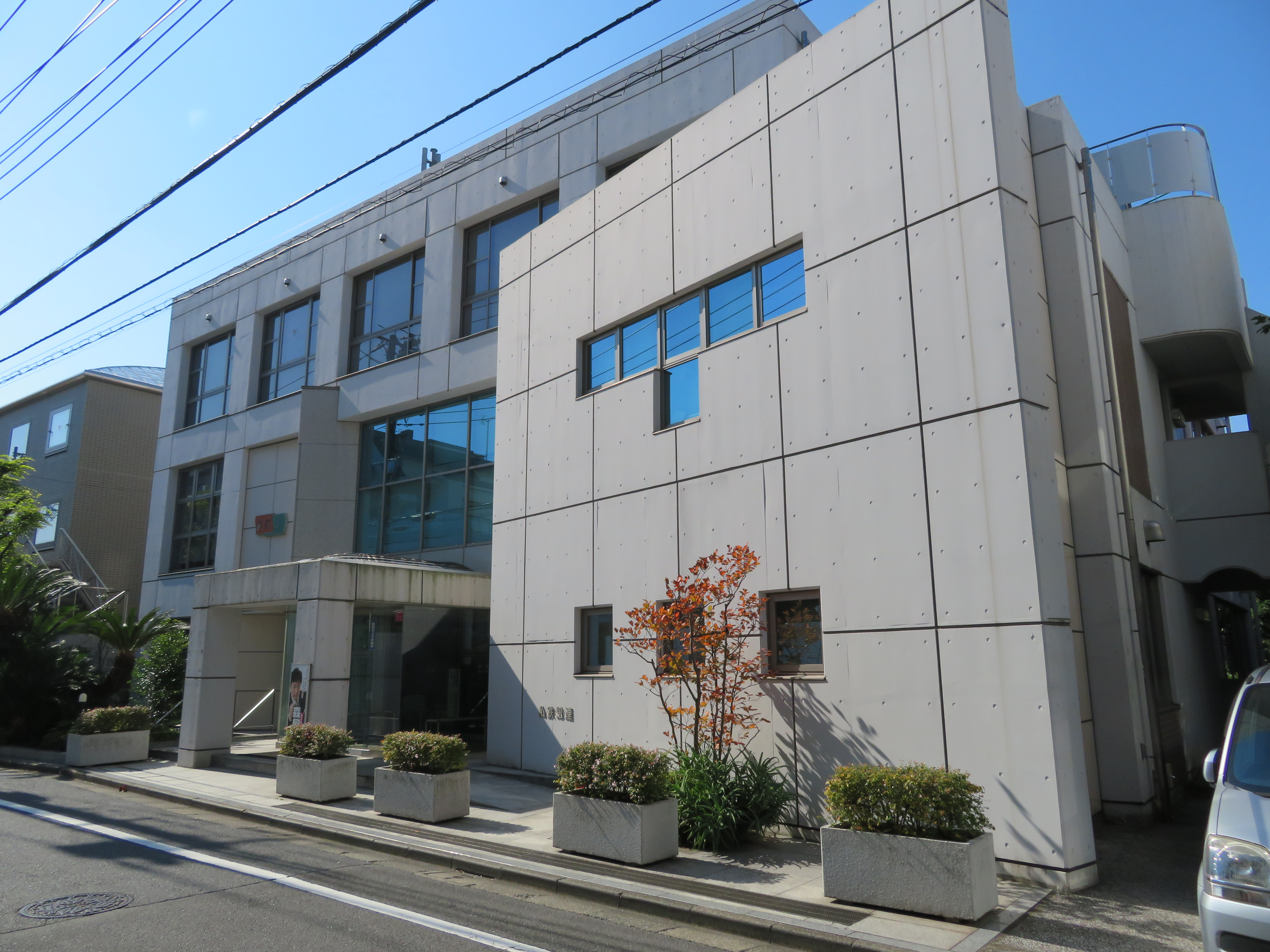
Headquarters of the General Federation of Private Railway and Bus Workers' Unions of Japan, located in Japan

The General Federation of Private Railway and Bus Workers' Unions of Japan (PRU, Japanese: 日本私鉄労働組合総連合会, Shitetsu Soren) is a trade union representing transport workers in Japan. Japan's railway companies, including major private railways excluding the JR Group, Taxis, Hire Companies, and Bus companies, are members, and follow the trend of the old general review system. Japan is a member of the Confederation of Trade Unions (Confederation), the Japan Transport Industry Trade Union Council (Transport Workers' Association), and the International Transport Workers' Federation (ITF).

== Overview ==
The union was founded on 10 January 1947 as a split from the Japan Transportation Labor Union Alliance. It was a founding affiliate of the original Japanese Trade Union Confederation. In 1949, it affiliated to the National Confederation of Trade Unions, but the following year, it left to become a founding affiliate of the General Council of Trade Unions of Japan. It led a strike in 1952, and participated in the general transport strike of 1967, but generally focused on negotiation. By 1967, it had 255,882 members.

In 1989, the union was a founding affiliate of the Japanese Trade Union Confederation. By 2020, it had 113,253 members.

In 2019, the 25th House of Councillors ordinary election, Takashi Moriya (Constitutional Democratic Party) who stood as a candidate within the organization (Constitutional Democratic Party) was elected in a proportional ward. As a result, for the first time in nine years, a member of the organization was elected to the Diet.

In the 49th House of Representatives general election in 2021, Kiyomi Tsujimoto was defeated, but in the following 2022, in the 26th ordinary election for members of the House of Councillors, the Federation of Private Railways decided to make Tsujimoto a candidate "within the quasi-organization]. Tsujimoto, who ran as a proportional representation candidate from the Constitutional Democratic Party of Japan in the same election, won the election with more than 400,000, and returned to national politics.

== Organization ==
- Private Railway Hokkaido Local Labor Union
- Tohoku Regional Federation of Private Railways
- Kanto Regional Federation of Private Railways
- There are blocks of Ote, Tokyo, Chiba, Ryoge, and Shizuru Kojin.
- Hokuriku Regional Federation of Private Railways
- Chubu Regional Federation of Private Railways
- Kansai Regional Federation of Private Railways

There are blocks such as Hyogo and Wakayama.

- Private Railway Chugoku Provincial Labor Union
- Shikoku Regional Federation of Private Railways
- Kyushu Regional Federation of Private Railways
- Okinawa Prefectural Federation of Trade Unions
- Private Railway Federation Haitaku Council
- Young Women's Council (Youth Women's Association)

It is an organization of union members who are generally under the age of 31. In order to promote exchanges among union members, in addition to sports competitions and exchange camps, the "Peace and Friendship Festival, Private Railway Mountain Festival" and "Private Railway Okinawa Exchange" are held every other year. Previously, it was called the "Young Women's Council". In the case of small companies, there are workplaces where there are problems such as a decrease in the number of young employees due to rationalization and a shrinking of the organization of the Youth Women's Association. Note: The members of the Youth Women's Association will be replaced in accordance with the re-election of union officers. If you are 31 years old at that time, you will be disengaged. Normally, you are re-elected once every two years, so depending on the timing, you will have to do 1-2 more years (if you are 30 years and 11 months old at the time of re-election, you will be a member until you are re-elected two years later).

== Major activities ==
- Shuntō
- Spring Victory! General rally
  - It is held every year in early March during the spring training season. Every year, it is held in the evening at the Hibiya Open Air Music Hall in Tokyo, and a demonstration march is held after the rally.
- Campaign to promote the use of public transportation
  - Under the slogan "We support everyday life where you can live with a smile," posters are displayed in the cars of member companies every year. The poster for the campaign also includes the Japan Private Railway Association (Mintetsukyo), the Japan Bus Association, and the National Federation of Hire Taxis as sponsors.
- Peace and Friendship Festival, Private Railway Mountain Festival (Young Women's Council)
- Utagoe of Private Railway Buses (Young Women's Council)
- It is held every other year (even-numbered) in conjunction with the private railway mountain festival and the peace march in May. This is an initiative in which young women from all over the country study about anti-war peace in Okinawa and deepen exchanges with their fellow members of the private railway Okinawa. As for dispatching, we carry out campa activities for each regional federation and send dispatchers.
- Private Railway General Encouragement and Protest of the Private Railway Association (Hold a rally in front of the Japan Private Railway Association during the spring fight)
  - Collective bargaining by the major central collective bargaining disappeared, and the protests of the Mintetsu Association were abolished a few years later. Currently, only the Private Railway Federation Encouragement Action is held (organized by the Kanto Regional Federation of Young Women's Council).

== Members of Parliament ==
- Takashi Moriya (Proportional Ward)
- Kiyomi Tsujimoto (Proportional ward)
