= Makoto Oniki =

Makoto Oniki may refer to:

- Makoto Oniki (House of Representatives), Japanese LDP politician
- Makoto Oniki (House of Councillors), Japanese CDP politician
