= Kureha Otsuki =

Japanese politician

- 大築 紅葉
- Otsuki in 2025

Member of the House of Representatives
- In office 5 November 2021 – 23 January 2026
- Preceded by: Multi-member district
- Succeeded by: Hiroyuki Nakamura
- Constituency: Hokkaido PR (2021–2024); Hokkaido 4th (2024–2026)

Personal details
- Born: 16 October 1983 (age 42) Otaru, Hokkaido, Japan
- Party: CRA (since 2026)
- Other political affiliations: CDP (until 2026)
- Education: Birmingham City University

Kureha Otsuki (born 16 October 1983) is a Japanese politician and reporter who served as a member of the House of Representatives from Hokkaido 4th district from 2024 to 2026. Prior to serving from the 4th district, she served from Hokkaido's proportional representation block from 2021 to 2024.

== Early life and career ==
Kureha Otsuki was born in Otaru, Hokkaido on 16 October 1983. After graduating from Hokkaido Otaru Choryo High School, she would travel to the United Kingdom in order to study journalism at Birmingham City University.

After graduating from university and returning to Japan, Otsuki would find work as an opposition reporter for Fuji Television's political affairs department.

== Political career ==
Kureha Otsuki's political career began in July 2021, following the resignation of Hiranao Honda, a previous representative of Hokkaido's proportional representation block, who resigned after reports of him making inappropriate comments during a private meeting of the Constitutional Democratic Party of Japan. After Honda announced he was not seeking reelection, Oksuki was selected by the CDP to appear on the electoral list, while also simultaneously mounting a campaign in Hokkaido's 4th district. In Hokkaido's 4th district, Otsuki was also endorsed by the Japanese Communist Party and Social Democratic Party of Japan.

During the 2021 Japanese general election, Otsuki lost to Liberal Democratic Party candidate Hiroyuki Nakamura by 696 votes, but still was able to secure a seat from Hokkaido's proportional representation block.

Otsuki supported Hokkaido 8th district representative Seiji Osaka during the 2021 Constitutional Democratic Party of Japan presidential election.

In 2023, Otsuki would speak at a plenary session of the House of Representatives, becoming the first single-term representative to be selected for a speech by the CDP. During the speech, Otsuki argued that women faced difficulty being active in politics due to "old-fashioned" leadership.

Otsuki endorsed Saitama 5th district representative Yukio Edano during the 2024 Constitutional Democratic Party of Japan presidential election.

During the 2024 election, Otsuki would stand for re-election to the House of Representatives, once again contesting Hokkaido's 4th district. She would win the election, defeating incumbent LDP candidate Hiroyuki Nakamura with a plurality of 45% of the vote.

== Electoral history ==
2024 Hokkaido 4th district election
| Party | Candidate | Votes | % | ±% |
|---|---|---|---|---|
| CDP | Kureha Otsuki | 101,484 | 45.1 | ▼4.7 |
| LDP | Hiroyuki Nakamura (elected by PR) | 94,090 | 41.8 | ▼8.4 |
| JCP | Akemi Sasaki | 19,063 | 8.5 | |
| Independent | Kayo Saitō | 10,322 | 4.6 | |
| Turnout | | | 57.32 | ▼3.82 |
| CDP gain from LDP | | | | |

2021 Hokkaido 4th district election
| Party | Candidate | Votes | % | ±% |
|---|---|---|---|---|
| LDP | Hiroyuki Nakamura (endorsed by Kōmeitō | 109,326 | 50.16 | ▲4.24 |
| CDP | Kureha Otsuki (endorsed by JCP and SDP) (elected by PR) | 108,630 | 49.84 | ▲9.85 |
| Majority | | 696 | 0.32 | ▼8,62 |
| Turnout | | | 61.14 | ▼0.80 |
| LDP hold | | Swing | ▼4.31 | |
