= Hokkaido 4th district =

Japan House of Representatives constituency

Hokkaido 4th District
- Parliamentary constituency for the Japanese House of Representatives
- Numbered map of Hokkaido Prefecture single-member districts

- Sapporo-area detail
- Prefecture: Hokkaido
- Proportional District: Hokkaido
- Electorate: 396,704 (2026)

Current constituency
- Seats: One
- Party: LDP
- Representative: Hiroyuki Nakamura
- Created from: Hokkaido's 1st "medium-sized" district
- Municipalities: Ishikari, Sapporo's Teine Ward and Shiribeshi Subprefecture

Hokkaidō 4th district (北海道[第]4区) is a single-member electoral district for the House of Representatives, the lower house of the National Diet of Japan. It represents Shiribeshi Subprefecture of Hokkaido (including the city of Otaru) as well as Teine Ward, a portion of Nishi Ward of Sapporo city and Ishikari city.

== List of representatives ==
| Representative | Party | Dates | Notes |
|---|---|---|---|
| Shizuo Satō | LDP | 1996 – 2003 | Also lost in the PR block |
| Yoshio Hachiro | DPJ | 2003 – 2012 | Also lost in the PR block |
| Hiroyuki Nakamura | LDP | 2012 – 2024 | Won a seat in the PR block |
| Kureha Otsuki | CDP | 2024 – 2026 | Also lost in the PR block |
| Hiroyuki Nakamura | LDP | 2026 – | |

== Recent results ==
2026
| Party | Candidate | Votes | % | ±% |
|---|---|---|---|---|
| LDP | Hiroyuki Nakamura (endorsed by Ishin) | 105,656 | 47.3 | ▲5.5 |
| Centrist Reform | Kureha Otsuki | 83,516 | 37.4 | ▼7.7 |
| Sanseitō | Shota Takahashi | 20,051 | 9.0 | |
| JCP | Akemi Sasaki | 14,005 | 6.3 | ▼2.2 |
| Turnout | | 223,228 | 57.20 | ▼0.12 |
| LDP gain from Centrist Reform | | | | |

2024
| Party | Candidate | Votes | % | ±% |
|---|---|---|---|---|
| CDP | Kureha Otsuki | 101,484 | 45.1 | ▼4.7 |
| LDP | Hiroyuki Nakamura (elected by PR) | 94,090 | 41.8 | ▼8.4 |
| JCP | Akemi Sasaki | 19,063 | 8.5 | |
| Independent | Kayo Saitō | 10,322 | 4.6 | |
| Turnout | | | 57.32 | ▼3.82 |
| CDP gain from LDP | | | | |

2021
| Party | Candidate | Votes | % | ±% |
|---|---|---|---|---|
| LDP | Hiroyuki Nakamura (endorsed by Kōmeitō | 109,326 | 50.16 | ▲4.24 |
| CDP | Kureha Otsuki (elected by PR) | 108,630 | 49.84 | ▲9.85 |
| Majority | | 696 | 0.32 | ▼8,62 |
| Turnout | | | 61.14 | ▼0.80 |
| LDP hold | | Swing | ▼4.31 | |

2017
| Party | Candidate | Votes | % | ±% |
|---|---|---|---|---|
| LDP | Hiroyuki Nakamura (endorsed by Kōmeitō and NPD) | 104,054 | 45.92 | ▲0.56 |
| CDP | Hiranao Honda (elected by PR) | 90,619 | 39.99 | N/A |
| Kibō no Tō | Miho Takahashi | 31,941 | 14.09 | N/A |
| Majority | | 16,105 | 8.94 | |
| Turnout | | | 61.94 | ▲4.20 |
| LDP hold | | Swing | N/A | |

2014
| Party | Candidate | Votes | % | ±% |
|---|---|---|---|---|
| LDP | Hiroyuki Nakamura (endorsed by Kōmeitō) | 77,690 | 45.36 | ▲1.14 |
| Democratic | Yoshio Hachiro (endorsed by NPD) | 70,049 | 40.90 | ▲11.33 |
| JCP | Takahiro Sakai | 23,532 | 13.74 | ▲1.86 |
| Majority | | 7,641 | 4.46 | |
| Turnout | | | 57.74 | ▼2.40 |
| LDP hold | | Swing | ▼5.10 | |

2012
| Party | Candidate | Votes | % | ±% |
|---|---|---|---|---|
| LDP | Hiroyuki Nakamura | 79,588 | 44.22 | ▲11.41 |
| Democratic | Yoshio Hachiro | 53,217 | 29.57 | ▼35.90 |
| NP-Daichi | Hideto Tomabechi | 25,788 | 14.32 | N/A |
| JCP | Yōko Kikuchi | 21,379 | 11.88 | N/A |
| Majority | | 26,371 | 14.65 | |
| Turnout | | 186,777 | 60.14 | ▼13.87 |
| LDP gain from Democratic | | Swing | ▲23.66 | |

2009
| Party | Candidate | Votes | % | ±% |
|---|---|---|---|---|
| Democratic | Yoshio Hachiro | 149,967 | 65.47 | ▲18.29 |
| LDP | Tōru Miyamoto | 75,029 | 32.81 | ▼9.94 |
| Happiness Realization | Shunzō Tsurumi | 3,923 | 1.72 | N/A |
| Majority | | 74,938 | 32.66 | |
| Turnout | | 234,260 | 74.01 | ▲1.93 |
| Democratic hold | | Swing | ▲14.12 | |

2005
| Party | Candidate | Votes | % | ±% |
|---|---|---|---|---|
| Democratic | Yoshio Hachiro | 108,023 | 47.18 | ▼1.86 |
| LDP | Shizuo Satō | 100,170 | 43.75 | ▲2.92 |
| JCP | Teiko Kotosaka | 20,766 | 9.07 | ▼1.05 |
| Turnout | | 233,155 | 72.08 | ▲7.29 |
| Democratic hold | | Swing | ▼2.39 | |

2003
| Party | Candidate | Votes | % | ±% |
|---|---|---|---|---|
| Democratic | Yoshio Hachiro | 100,883 | 49.04 | |
| LDP | Shizuo Satō | 83,994 | 40.83 | |
| JCP | Teiko Kotosaka | 20,827 | 10.12 | |
| Turnout | | 210,272 | 64.79 | |
| Democratic gain from LDP | | Swing | | |

2000
| Party | Candidate | Votes | % | ±% |
|---|---|---|---|---|
| LDP | Shizuo Satō | 88,825 | 42.9 | |
| Democratic | Ryūichi Ikeda | 81,805 | 39.5 | |
| JCP | Teiko Kotosaka | 36,257 | 17.5 | |

1996
| Party | Candidate | Votes | % | ±% |
|---|---|---|---|---|
| LDP | Shizuo Satō | 58,371 | 30.7 | |
| New Frontier | Kōji Suzuki | 53,332 | 28.1 | |
| Democratic | Ryūichi Ikeda | 51,714 | 27.2 | |
| JCP | Tokiya Yamato | 26,562 | 14.0 | |
