= Harumi Yoshida =

Japanese politician (born 1972)

- 吉田 晴美
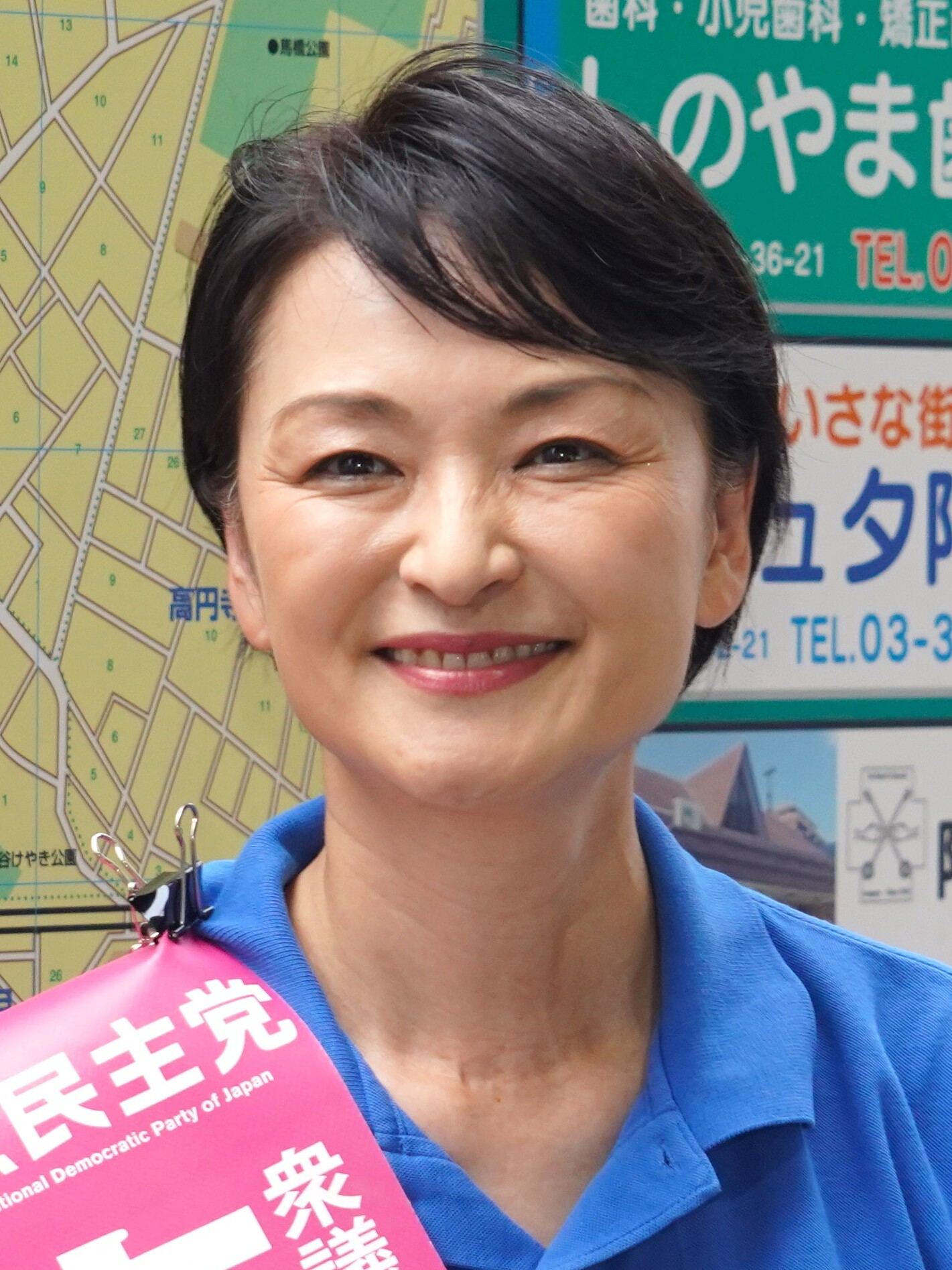
- Yoshida in 2024

Member of the House of Representatives
- In office 31 October 2021 – 23 January 2026
- Preceded by: Nobuteru Ishihara
- Succeeded by: Hiroko Kado
- Constituency: Tokyo 8th

Personal details
- Born: 1 January 1972 (age 54) Nishimurayama, Yamagata, Japan
- Party: CRA (since 2026)
- Other political affiliations: DPJ (2012–2016); DP (2016–2017); CDP (2017–2026)
- Education: Rikkyo University; University of Birmingham
- Website: yoshidaharumi.com

Harumi Yoshida (吉田 晴美, Yoshida Harumi; born 1 January 1972) is a Japanese politician who served as a member of the House of Representatives for Tokyo's 8th district. She defeated Nobuteru Ishihara in the 2021 Japanese general election. She stood in the 2024 CDP leadership election, where she placed fourth.

== Biography ==
She was born in the town of Kahoku inside the Nishimurayama District of Yamagata, and grew up in a greengrocer's family. After graduating from High School, she first attended Rikkyo University and majored in Japanese literature, before beginning work as a flight attendant and married.

She studied abroad at the University of Birmingham in 2002, and obtained a Master of Business Administration in 2003. After, she worked as a management consultant for KPMG Healthcare in Japan.

She entered politics beginning in the early 2010s, first running in the Chiba Prefectural Assembly election in 2011 for the Ichikawa City constituency, which elects six seats. Her and every Democratic Party of Japan candidate in the seat were defeated. In early 2012, she then became Secretary to Toshio Ogawa, a member of the House of Councillors and Minister of Justice. The following year, in 2013, she was nominated by the Democratic Party for the House of Councilors election in the Iwate at-large district. However, she placed fourth.

In 2016, she was selected by the Democratic Party as branch chief for Tokyo-8th in the upcoming general election.

After continuing her own work in the private sector for the next few years, the Democratic Party and President Seiji Maehara effectively agreed to merge with Kibō no Tō, a party newly founded by Tokyo Governor Yuriko Koike. Following the announcement, several politicians inside the Democratic Party denounced this, such as Yukio Edano, and moved to form a new party due to Koike refusing to put up liberal candidates, the Constitutional Democratic Party of Japan. On the same day the new party was announced, Yoshida, alongside Yosuke Suzuki and Akihiro Matsuo (who also served as branch chiefs in certain areas), announced their intention to run under the CDP in their respective districts.

The next day, it was announced that Kibō no Tō would be standing Takatane Kiuchi, a businessman and CEO in the district against Yoshida and Ishihara. Despite the relative success of the CDP in beating Koike's party for second in the general election, Yoshida lost in what was mainly chalked up to a vote split in the opposition. CDP, KnT, and Communist candidates all took sizeable chunks of the vote, while Ishihara won with less than 40% of the vote. She did not win a seat through proportional representation.

=== 2021 election ===
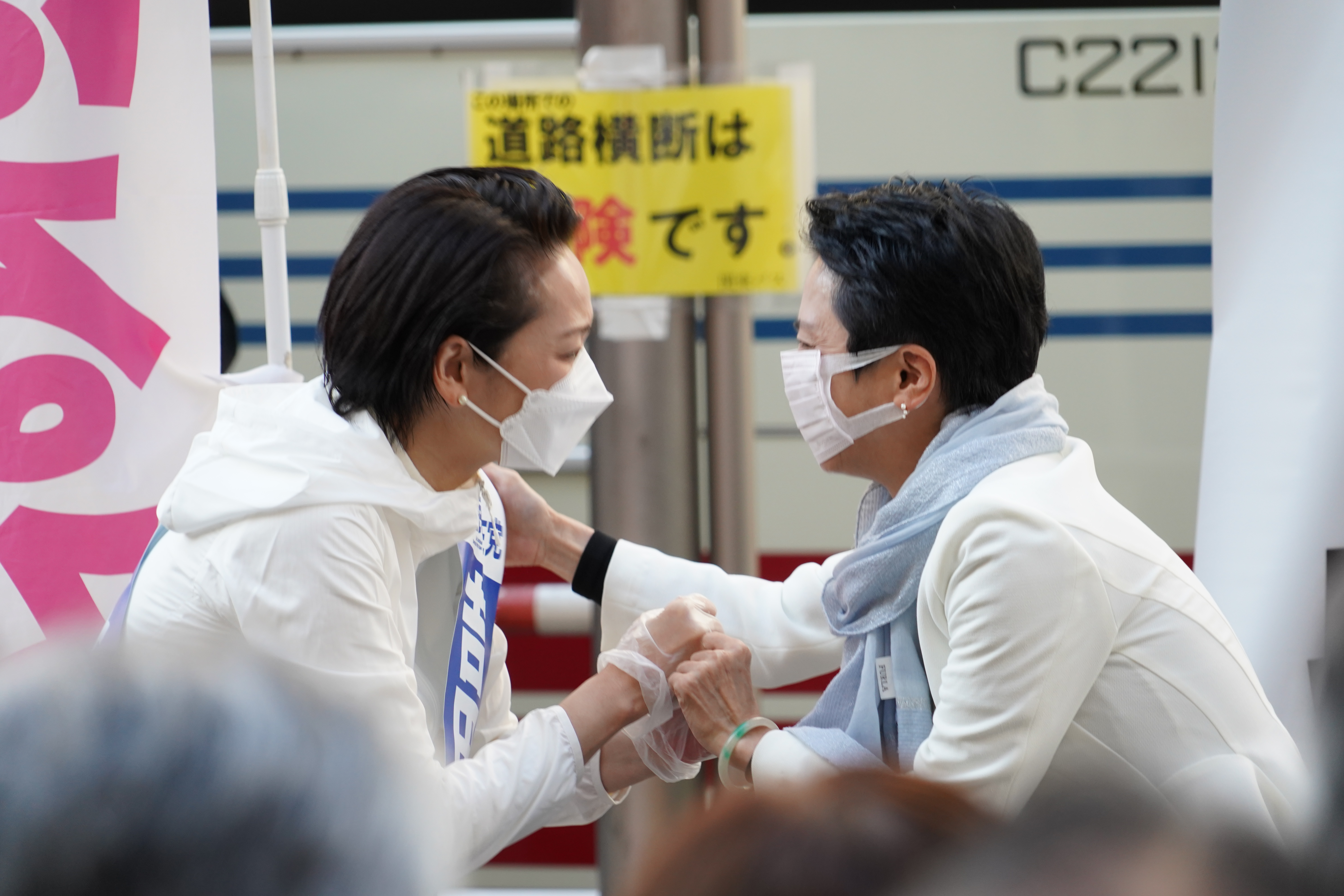
Renhō and Yoshida at a rally, 2021

On 12 September 2020, Nippon Ishin no Kai announced it would field former Sanda City Council member Keiji Kasatani as their candidate for Tokyo's 8th district in the next general election. Three days later, a majority of the Democratic Party For the People and the CDP merged with the CDP being founded again. On 28 September, the Japanese Communist Party announced it was also fielding a candidate for the district, former Suginami Assembly member Masatake Kamibo. He lost by thirteen votes in his assembly ward in 2019.

At 2 A.M on 8 October in 2021, shortly after the announcement of the next general election, the Tokyo Shimbun reported that Reiwa Shinsengumi leader Taro Yamamoto had decided to run in the 8th district in Tokyo, as he had run there previously. The report also stated that he was expected to become the "unified opposition candidate", causing confusion with Yoshida and the CDP. CDP leader Yukio Edano held a press conference the following morning, asking Yamamoto to reconsider. He cited that "Our party's candidate has been rooted in the local community for many years and thinks that she can fight on equal terms in a single-seat district." That evening, Yamamoto declared his candidacy for the district in front of Shinjuku Station. At this point, coordination between the CDP and JCP had progressed towards unifying behind Yoshida, but Yamamoto emphasized that coordination was progressing to unify behind him, saying, "We can't do this without collaborating." On 9 October, Edano stated that he was "frankly confused", and the two sides were at odds. After receiving backlash from local civic groups, Yamamoto withdrew from the district. He revealed that, in November 2019, the CDP had approached him to run in the district. The JCP announced that Masatake had withdrawn, and the SDP Tokyo branch along with Reiwa Shinsengumi endorsed Yoshida. Yamamoto instead ran in the Tokyo proportional block.

On the general election a few days later, Yoshida, who had gained fame for the incident with Yamamoto, defeated Nobuteru Ishihara of the LDP and Keiji Kasatani of Nippon Ishin no Kai, who had run as a third opposition vote, in line with Ishin across the country. Yoshida nearly won with 50% of the vote. Both Ishihara and Kasatani were unable to be elected to the proportional block. During the leadership election in the CDP after Yukio Edano resigned, she was an endorser of Chinami Nishimura.

=== CDP leadership bid ===
On 7 September 2024, following the announcement of the CDP leadership election, she announced her own candidacy after Kenji Eda announced he would not run. She placed fourth and was eliminated in the first round, with eventual winner Yoshihiko Noda appointing her as Shadow Minister of State for Gender Equality as a part of his Next Cabinet.

== Personal life ==
She is married. She has publicly announced one of her daughters was diagnosed with autism.
