= Makoto Oniki (House of Councillors) =

- 鬼木 誠
- Oniki in 2025

Member of the House of Councillors
- Incumbent
- Assumed office 26 July 2022
- Constituency: National PR

Personal details
- Born: 7 December 1963 (age 62) Chikushino, Fukuoka, Japan
- Party: Constitutional Democratic
- Education: Chikushi High School

Makoto Oniki (鬼木 誠, Makoto Oniki, born 7 December 1963) is a Japanese politician from the Constitutional Democratic Party.

== Career ==
Born in 1963 in Tsukushino, Fukuoka Prefecture.

Oniki became a labor activist and worked at the Fukuoka Teachers' Union.

Oniki has been active in the All-Japan Prefectural and Municipal Workers' Union since 2014. He became Director-General of the Organizational Countermeasures Bureau of the Central Headquarters and served as Director-General of the General Public Private Bureau and Secretary-General.

In 2022, he ran and won the House of Councillors election from the National proportional representation block.

Oniki belongs to Justice Committee, Committee on Oversight of Administration, and Special Committee on Disasters.
