= Tokyo 8th district =

Japan House of Representatives constituency

Tokyo 8th District
- Parliamentary constituency for the Japanese House of Representatives
- Numbered map of inner Tokyo single-member districts
- Prefecture: Tokyo
- Proportional District: Tokyo

Current constituency
- Created: 1994
- Seats: One
- Party: LDP
- Representative: Hiroko Kado
- Created from: Tokyo 4th district
- Wards: Most of Suginami

Tokyo 8th district (東京都第8区, Tōkyō-to dai-hachiku or simply 東京8区, Tōkyō-hachiku) is a single-member constituency of the House of Representatives in the national Diet of Japan. It is located in western part of former Tokyo City and is almost coterminous with Suginami Ward (a small area in the east is part of the Tokyo 27th district). The district was created in 1994 as part of an electoral reform effort in the Japanese House of Representatives, and was first implemented in the 1996 general election.

As of 2015, this district was home to 365,194 constituents.

Before a series of electoral reforms in 1994, Suginami Ward had been part of Tokyo 4th district, where five representatives had been elected by single non-transferable vote.

From the creation of the district until 2021, the only representative for the district was Nobuteru Ishihara, a former LDP secretary-general and Minister of the Environment who headed his own faction and is the son of Shintarō Ishihara former Governor of Tōkyō. Ishihara lost the seat to Harumi Yoshida, a university professor, in the 2021 elections. Tarō Yamamoto, leader of the Reiwa Shinsengumi, had announced he would run in the district, but he bowed out and endorsed Yoshida.

== List of representatives ==
Representative	Party	Dates	Notes
Nobuteru Ishihara	LDP	1996–2021	
Harumi Yoshida	CDP	2021–2026	
Hiroko Kado	LDP	2026–	

== Election results ==
2026
Party	Candidate	Votes	%	±%
LDP	Hiroko Kado	108,020	44.3	▲11.6
Centrist Reform	Harumi Yoshida	77,620	31,8	▼19.3
DPP	Issei Morita	26,989	11.1	
Reiwa	Tokuma Kaiho	11,419	4.7	
Sanseitō	Baku Nagai	10,642	4.4	▼2.8
CPJ	Shirō Ōtani	8,110	3.3	
Independent	Yukihiro Fujiwara	1,111	0.5	
Turnout			63.48	▲3.44
LDP gain from Centrist Reform				

2024
Party	Candidate	Votes	%	±%
CDP	Harumi Yoshida (endorsed by SDP)	116,426	51.05	▲2.60
LDP	Hiroko Kado (endorsed by Kōmeitō)	74,963	32.87	▼4.3
Ishin	Chitose Nanboku	20,342	8.92	▼5.46
Sanseitō	Noriaki Oomori	16,310	7.15	new
Turnout		228,041	60.04	▼0.99

2021
Party	Candidate	Votes	%	±%
CDP	Harumi Yoshida (endorsed by Reiwa and SDP)	137,341	48.45	▲18.49
LDP	Nobuteru Ishihara (endorsed by Kōmeitō)	105,381	37,17	▼2.05
Ishin	Keiji Kasatani	40,763	14.38	
Majority			11.28	
Turnout			61.03	▲5.61
CDP gain from LDP		Swing	10.27	

2017
Party	Candidate	Votes	%	±%
LDP	Nobuteru Ishihara (endorsed by Kōmeitō)	99,863	39.22	▼8.34
CDP	Harumi Yoshida	76,283	29.96	
Kibō no Tō	Takatane Kiuchi	41,175	16.17	
JCP	Fumiko Osanai	22,399	8.80	
Independent	Yoriko Madoka	11,997	4.71	

2014
Party	Candidate	Votes	%	±%
LDP	Nobuteru Ishihara (endorsed by Kōmeitō)	116,193	47.56	
Democratic	Yoriko Madoka (endorsed by PLP)	73,348	30.02	
JCP	Shingo Sawada	37,788	15.47	
Independent	Tatsuo Suzuki	16,981	6.95	

2012
Party	Candidate	Votes	%	±%
LDP	Nobuteru Ishihara (endorsed by Kōmeitō)	132,521	46.9	
Independent	Tarō Yamamoto (endorsed by SDP, TPJ)	71,028	25.2	
Democratic	Yoriko Madoka	54,881	19.4	
JCP	Masatake Jōho	23,961	8.5	

2009
Party	Candidate	Votes	%	±%
LDP	Nobuteru Ishihara (endorsed by Kōmeitō)	147,514	49.9	
Social Democratic	Nobuto Hosaka (endorsed by DPJ, PNP)	116,723	39.5	
JCP	Shunji Sawada	24,965	8.5	
Happiness Realization	Seiichi Ueta	6,132	2.1	
Turnout		301,928	65.5	

2005
Party	Candidate	Votes	%	±%
LDP	Nobuteru Ishihara	161,966	57.3	
Democratic	Morio Suzuki	94,074	33.3	
JCP	Shunji Sawada	26,819	9.5	
Turnout		288,840	64.61	

2003
Party	Candidate	Votes	%	±%
LDP	Nobuteru Ishihara (endorsed by NCP)	136,429	55.0	
Democratic	Morio Suzuki	78,007	31.4	
JCP	Shunji Sawada	17,572	7.1	
Social Democratic	Akiko Sugiyama	16,156	6.5	
Turnout		254,314	57.39	

2000
Party	Candidate	Votes	%	±%
LDP	Nobuteru Ishihara (endorsed by NCP)	105,779	43.7	
Democratic	Mitsuyo Katayama	77,132	31.8	
JCP	Kazuko Yamazaki	36,546	15.1	
Independent	Hidenori Hasegawa	22,799	9.4	

1996
Party	Candidate	Votes	%	±%
LDP	Nobuteru Ishihara	74,856	32.7	
New Frontier	Hiroshi Yamada	67,670	29.5	
JCP	Kazuyoshi Hatta	40,677	17.8	
Democratic	Seijun Murata	37,598	16.4	
Independent	Takeshi Tsuji	8,324	3.6	
Turnout		234,869	55.64	

== In popular culture ==
The 8th district is featured in the fifth season of the anime Aggretsuko, with the main character Retsuko running for election to the district for the Rage Party against her boyfriend Haida's brother Jiro to succeed his father Juzo.
