= Nobuteru Ishihara =

Japanese politician

- 石原 伸晃
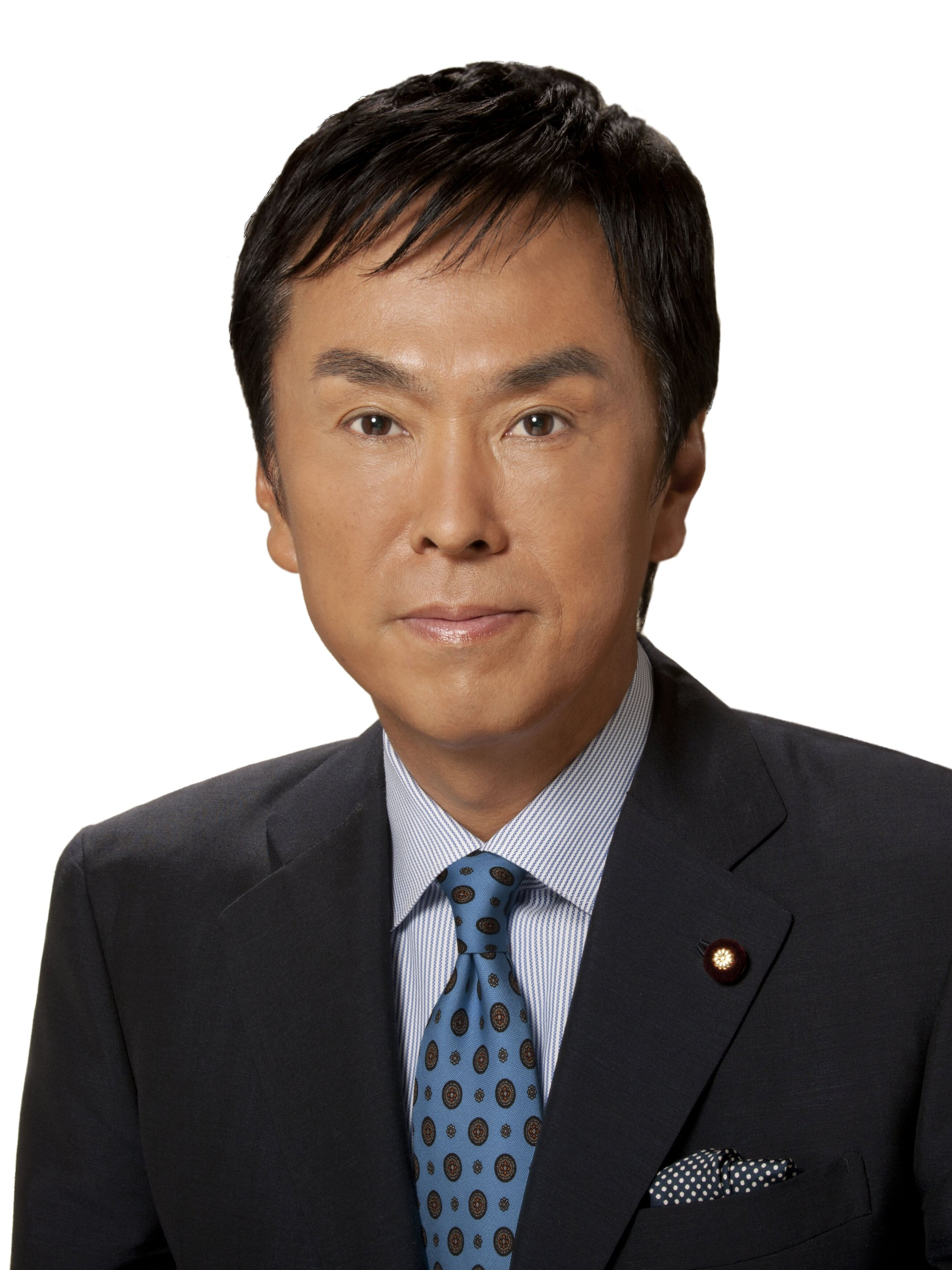
- Official portrait, 2016

Minister of State for Economic and Fiscal Policy
- In office 28 January 2016 – 3 August 2017
- Prime Minister: Shinzo Abe
- Preceded by: Akira Amari
- Succeeded by: Toshimitsu Motegi

Minister of the Environment and Minister of State for Corporation in Nuclear Emergency Preparedness
- In office 26 December 2012 – 3 September 2014
- Prime Minister: Shinzo Abe
- Preceded by: Hiroyuki Nagahama
- Succeeded by: Yoshio Mochizuki

Secretary-General of the Liberal Democratic Party
- In office 9 September 2010 – 28 September 2012
- President: Sadakazu Tanigaki
- Vice President: Tadamori Ōshima
- Preceded by: Tadamori Ōshima
- Succeeded by: Shigeru Ishiba

Minister of Land, Infrastructure, Transport and Tourism
- In office 22 September 2003 – 27 September 2004
- Prime Minister: Junichiro Koizumi
- Preceded by: Chikage Oogi
- Succeeded by: Kazuo Kitagawa

Minister of State for Regulatory Reform
- In office 26 April 2001 – 22 September 2003
- Prime Minister: Junichiro Koizumi
- Preceded by: Ryutaro Hashimoto
- Succeeded by: Kazuyoshi Kaneko

Member of the House of Representatives
- In office 18 February 1990 – 14 October 2021
- Preceded by: Naohiko Ōkubo
- Succeeded by: Harumi Yoshida
- Constituency: Tokyo 4th (1990–1996); Tokyo 8th (1996–2021)

Personal details
- Born: 19 April 1957 (age 69) Zushi, Kanagawa, Japan
- Party: Liberal Democratic
- Spouse: Risa Tanaka (m. 1988)
- Parent(s): Shintaro Ishihara; Noriko Ishihara
- Relatives: Yoshizumi Ishihara; Hirotaka Ishihara
- Education: Keio University

Nobuteru Ishihara (石原 伸晃, Ishihara Nobuteru; born April 19, 1957) is a Japanese politician, who served as the Secretary-General of the Liberal Democratic Party from 2010 to 2012. Previously, he also served in the House of Representatives as representative from 1990 to 2021.

== Early life and career ==
Ishihara was born and raised in the Greater Tokyo Area, the son of essay writer Noriko Ishihara and author and former Tokyo governor Shintaro Ishihara. Ishihara attended Keio Gijuku High School and graduated from the literature faculty of Keio University in 1981. After university, he worked as a political reporter for Nippon Television, covering the Finance and Foreign Ministries and the Prime Minister.

In 1990, he was elected to the House of Representatives as representative for the Fourth District of Tokyo under the Liberal Democratic Party (LDP) ticket. He was appointed Parliamentary Vice-Minister of International Trade and Industry in 1996. Under Junichiro Koizumi's first Cabinet in 2001, he became Minister of State for Administrative and Regulatory Reform. He served as Minister of Land, Infrastructure and Transport from 2003 to 2004, and was chairman of the Highways Committee of the LDP Policy Affairs Research Council from 2005 to 2007.

Following Prime Minister Yasuo Fukuda's resignation, Ishihara stood as a candidate for the LDP presidency. In the leadership election, held on September 22, 2008, Taro Aso won with 351 of the 527 votes; Ishihara placed fourth with 37 votes.

Ishihara was named as a potential LDP candidate for the 2014 gubernatorial election in Tokyo, but along with fellow LDP legislators Yuriko Koike, Tamayo Marukawa and Satsuki Katayama, performed poorly in a December 2013 poll against Yoichi Masuzoe and Hideo Higashikokubaru.

Ishihara was head of the Kinmirai Seiji Kenkyūkai faction of the LDP from 2012 to 2021.

In 2021, Ishihara lost his seat in the general election. After the elections, he was appointed an advisor to the Kishida Cabinet, but he resigned after a week when it emerged that the local LDP chapter he headed, received government subsidies intended for businesses recovering from the COVID-19 pandemic.

Political offices
Preceded by Ryūtarō Hashimoto	Minister of State for Regulatory Reform; 2001–2003	Succeeded by Kazuyoshi Kaneko
Preceded by Chikage Oogi	Minister of Land, Infrastructure, Transport of Japan; 2003–2004	Succeeded by Kazuo Kitagawa
Preceded by Hiroyuki Nagahama	Minister of the Environment; 2012–2014	Succeeded by Yoshio Mochizuki
Preceded by Hiroyuki Nagahama	Minister of State for Corporation in Nuclear Emergency Preparedness; 2012–2014	Succeeded by Yoshio Mochizuki
Preceded by Akira Amari	Minister of State for Economic and Fiscal Policy; 2016–2017	Succeeded by Toshimitsu Motegi
Party political offices
Preceded by Shōichi Nakagawa	Chair, Policy Research Council of the Liberal Democratic Party; 2007	Succeeded by Sadakazu Tanigaki
Preceded by Tadamori Ōshima	Secretary-General of the Liberal Democratic Party; 2010–2012	Succeeded by Shigeru Ishiba
Preceded by Taku Yamasaki	Head of the Kinmirai Seiji Kenkyūkai; 2012–2021	Succeeded by Hiroshi Moriyama
House of Representatives (Japan)
Preceded by Shigeru Kasuya; Ichirō Takahashi; Zenmei Matsumoto; Mitsu Kaneko; Naohiko Ōkubo	Representative for Tokyo 4th district (multi-member); 1990–1996; Served alongside: Hiroshi Yamada, Zenmei Matsumoto, Shigeru Kasuya, Ichirō Takahashi, Tamako Toguchi, Masato Okita	District eliminated
New district	Representative for Tokyo 8th district 1996–2021	Succeeded by Harumi Yoshida
Preceded by Yasuhisa Shiozaki	Chair, Committee on Judicial Affairs of the House of Representatives; 2005–2006	Succeeded by Akira Shichijō
