= Shinji Morimoto =

Japanese politician

- 森本 真治

Member of the House of Councillors
- Incumbent
- Assumed office 29 July 2013
- Preceded by: Koji Sato
- Constituency: Hiroshima at-large

Member of the Hiroshima City Council
- In office April 2003 – February 2013
- Constituency: Asakita Ward

Personal details
- Born: 2 May 1973 (age 53) Asakita, Hiroshima, Japan
- Party: CDP (since 2020)
- Other political affiliations: DPJ (2013–2016); DP (2016–2018); DPP (2018–2020)
- Education: Doshisha University

Shinji Morimoto (Morimoto Shinji, born 2 May 1973) is a Japanese politician of the Constitutional Democratic Party who has been serving in the House of Councillors (the upper house of the Diet) since 2013.

== Early life ==
Morimoto was born in Hiroshima Prefecture on May 2, 1973. He graduated from the Department of Social Welfare of Doshisha University in Kyoto in 1997. That same year, he joined the Matsushita Institute of Government and Management, a leadership academy founded by Konosuke Matsuhita, the founder of Panasonic. In 1999, he worked as a secretary in a Law Office. In 2003, he was elected to the Hiroshima City Assembly, a position he held until his election to the House of Councillors in 2013.

== Political career ==
Morimoto is a member of the following House committees:

- Committee on Economy and Industry
- Committee on Rules and Administration (Director)
- Special Committee on Official Development Assistance and Related Matters (Director)
