= Takashi Moriya =

- 森屋 隆

Member of the House of Councillors
- In office 29 July 2019 – 28 July 2025
- Constituency: National PR

Personal details
- Born: 28 June 1967 (age 58) Hinohara, Tokyo, Japan
- Party: CDP (since 2018)
- Other political affiliations: DPJ (2015–2016); DP (2016–2018)

Takashi Moriya is a Japanese politician who is a former member of the House of Councillors of Japan.

== Career ==
He began working at Nishi Tokyo Bus in 1986 and became a Member of the Executive Committee of the Nishi Tokyo Bus Workers' Union in 1998. In 2002, he joined the Executive Committee of the West Tokyo Labor Union Headquarters, and by 2008, he was serving as Vice Chairman of the Private Railway Union Kanto Regional Federation. In 2013, he was appointed Secretary General of the Kanto Regional Council of Transportation and Transportation Industry Labor Unions, and in 2015, he became Director of the Transportation Policy Bureau for the Japan Private Railway Union Federation. He is married with one son and one daughter, and enjoys mountain climbing in his free time.
