= Makiko Kishi =

Japanese politician

- 岸 真紀子
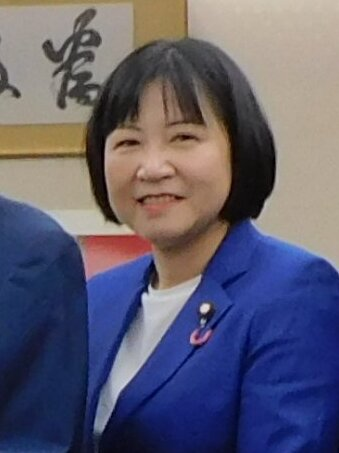
- Kishi in May 2025.

Member of the House of Councillors
- Incumbent
- Assumed office 29 July 2019
- Constituency: National PR

Personal details
- Born: 24 March 1976 (age 50) Kurisawa, Hokkaido, Japan
- Party: Constitutional Democratic

Makiko Kishi is a Japanese politician who is a member of the House of Councillors of Japan.

Kishi was elected for the first time in the 2019 House of Councillors election. As of October 2023, she serves as a member of several important committees within the House of Councillors, including the Committee on General Affairs, the Committee on Fiscal Affairs, and the Special Committee on Regional Revitalization and the Formation of a Digital Society, where she holds the position of chief director.
