= Hideya Sugio =

Japanese politician

- 杉尾 秀哉
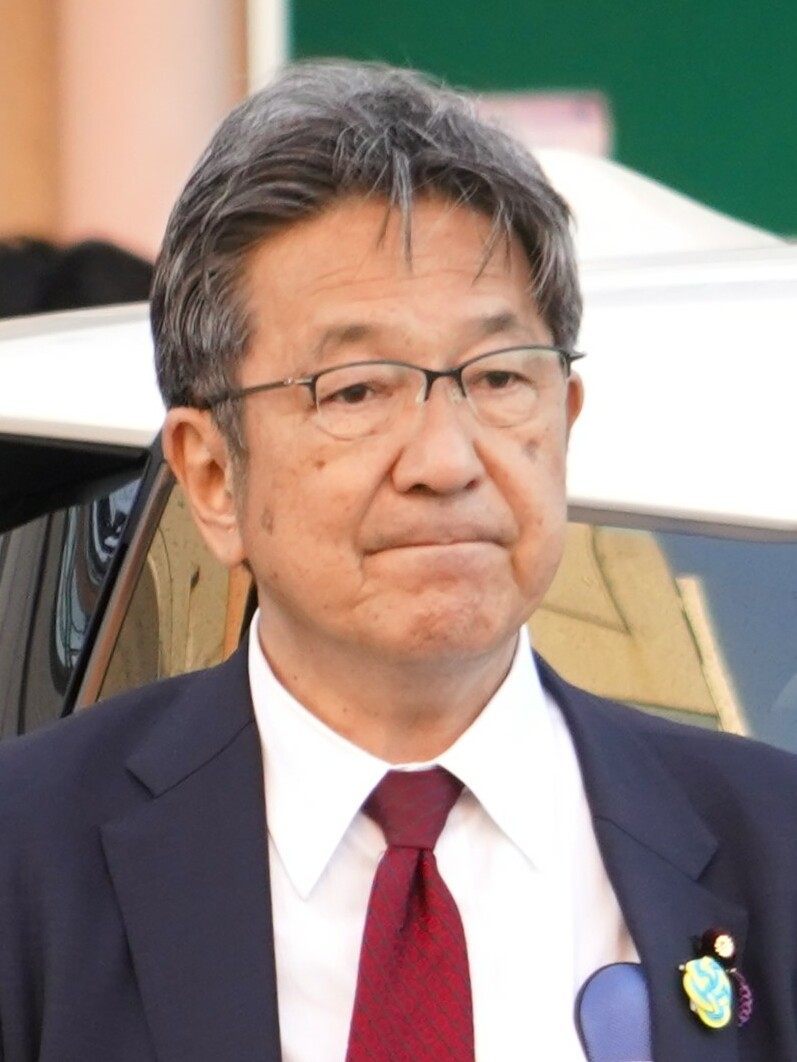
- Sugio in 2023

Member of the House of Councillors
- Incumbent
- Assumed office 26 July 2016
- Preceded by: Toshimi Kitazawa
- Constituency: Nagano at-large

Personal details
- Born: 30 September 1957 (age 69) Moji, Fukuoka, Japan
- Party: CDP (since 2018)
- Other political affiliations: DPJ (2015–2016); DP (2016–2018)
- Education: University of Tokyo

Hideya Sugio is a Japanese politician who is a member of the House of Councillors of Japan.

Sugio is part of the CDP's shadow cabinet 'Next Cabinet' as the shadow Minister in Charge of the Cabinet.

== Career ==
He graduated from Tokyo University in 1981, and worked for Tokyo Broadcasting System and Japan News Network before entering politics.

He had announced his candidacy on January 11, 2016. In 2020, he and Hiroyuki Konishi failed a lawsuit for defamation demanding internet providers and others who may provide the identity behind the Twitter user known as "Dappi".
