= Seiji Osaka =

Japanese politician (born 1959)

Seiji Ōsaka
- 逢坂 誠二
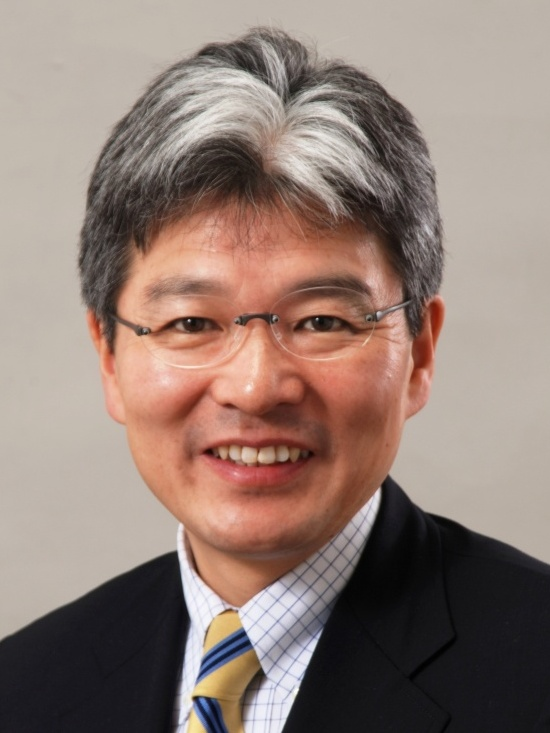
- Official portrait, 2011

Deputy Leader of the Constitutional Democratic Party
- In office 30 November 2021 – 30 September 2024
- Leader: Kenta Izumi

Member of the House of Representatives
- In office 15 December 2014 – 23 January 2026
- Preceded by: Kazuo Maeda
- Succeeded by: Jun Mukōyama
- Constituency: Hokkaido 8th
- In office 12 September 2005 – 16 November 2012
- Preceded by: Multi-member district
- Succeeded by: Kazuo Maeda
- Constituency: Hokkaido PR (2005–2009); Hokkaido 8th (2009–2012)

Mayor of Niseko
- In office November 1994 – 29 August 2005
- Preceded by: Tomio Watanabe
- Succeeded by: Ryūichi Satō

Personal details
- Born: 24 April 1959 (age 67) Niseko, Hokkaido, Japan
- Party: Centrist Reform Alliance
- Other political affiliations: Independent (1994–2005); DPJ (2005–2016); DP (2016–2017); CDP (2017–2026)
- Education: Hokkaido University
- Website: Official website

Seiji Osaka (逢坂 誠二, Ōsaka Seiji; born 24 April 1959) is a Japanese politician of the Constitutional Democratic Party of Japan (CDP), a member of the House of Representatives in the Diet (national legislature).

== Political career ==
=== Mayor of Niseko ===
Osaka ran for Mayor of Niseko, a ski resort area in Hokkaido, in the 1994 election, and held that position until he resigned in 2005 to run for national office in the House of Representatives.

=== House of Representatives ===
Osaka was first elected to the House of Representatives as a Hokkaido Proportional Representation candidate in 2005. In 2009 he was elected as the representative for Hokkaido's 8th district constituency, and served as such until he lost his seat in the 2012 election.

He regained his seat in Hokkaido’s 8th district in 2014 and is still the current representative as of the results of the 2024 election.

Osaka was a member of the Democratic Party. While he joined the CDP on the day it was formed, he ran on an independent ticket in the 2017 general election.
