= Constitutional Democratic Party of Japan =

Japanese political party

Constitutional Democratic Party of Japan 立憲民主党 Rikken-minshutō
- Abbreviation: CDP; CDPJ
- President: Shunichi Mizuoka (Note: Interim leader, as registered with the Minister for Internal Affairs and Communications.)
- Secretary-General: Masayo Tanabu
- Founder: Yukio Edano
- Founded: 3 October 2017; 9 years ago 15 September 2020; 6 years ago (Note: The "old CDP" was founded on 3 October 2017 as a split from the Democratic Party and dissolved on 14 September 2020, while the current party was founded on 15 September 2020 as a merger of the old CDP, the majority of the Democratic Party For the People and some independent lawmakers.)
- Split from: Democratic Party (2016)
- Preceded by: Constitutional Democratic Party of Japan
- Headquarters: 2-12-4 Fuji Building 3F, Hirakawa-chō, Chiyoda-ku, Tokyo 102-0093, Japan
- Newspaper: Rikken-minshu
- Youth wing: RikkenYouth
- Membership (August 2024): 114,839
- Ideology: Liberalism (Japanese); Social liberalism
- Political position: Centre to centre-left
- National affiliation: Centrist Reform Alliance (2026)
- Regional affiliation: Council of Asian Liberals and Democrats (observer)
- Colors: Blue
- Slogan: 政権交代こそ、最大の政治改革。 Seiken koutai koso, saidaino seijikaikaku. ('A change of government is the biggest political reform.')
- Senators: 39 / 248
- Representatives: 0 / 465
- Prefectural assembly members: 231 / 2,614
- Municipal assembly members: 730 / 28,940

Election symbol

Party flag
- Alternative flag

Website
- Japanese; cdp-japan.jp; English; cdp-japan.jp/english

The Constitutional Democratic Party of Japan (立憲民主党, Rikken-minshutō; CDP or CDPJ) is a liberal political party in Japan. It is the primary centre-left party in Japan, and was the second largest party in the National Diet behind the ruling Liberal Democratic Party (LDP).

It was founded in October 2017 as a split from the Democratic Party ahead of the 2017 general election, where it allied with the Japanese Communist Party and Social Democratic Party and overtook Kibō no Tō to become the largest opposition party. In late 2020, the party was re-founded following a merger with majorities of the Democratic Party For the People and the Social Democratic Party as well as some independent lawmakers. In the 2021 general election, it underperformed expectations and lost several seats. In the 2024 general election, the party surged and achieved the best result in its history, gaining 148 seats, up from 96 before. In 2026, it merged with Komeito in the House of Representatives to form the Centrist Reform Alliance in advance of the 2026 general election, however the party still caucuses as the CDP in the Senate and in local elections. In the 2026 election, CDP-affiliated members of the CRA lost most of their seats, reducing the number of CDP-affiliated representatives from 144 to 21.

The party's platform supports raising the minimum wage, expanded welfare policies, the legalization of same-sex marriage, increased gender equality, renewable energy policies, decentralization, a multilateral and pragmatic foreign policy, the revision of the U.S.–Japan Status of Forces Agreement, tax reform and electoral reform. The party strongly opposes efforts to amend the Japanese Constitution to reinterpret Article 9 or codify the status of the Japan Self-Defense Forces and also opposes nuclear power.

== History ==
=== Formation and 2017 election ===
Alternative CDPJ logo

The party was formed in the run up to the 2017 general election from a split of the centre-left wing of the opposition Democratic Party (DP). Prior to the election on 28 September 2017, the DP House of Representatives caucus dissolved in order for party members to stand as candidates for Tokyo governor Yuriko Koike's Party of Hope or as independents in the upcoming election.

The new party was launched on 2 October 2017 by DP deputy leader Yukio Edano at a press conference in Tokyo for liberals and left-leaning members of the DP who did not wish to, or were rejected for, contesting the election as candidates for the Party of Hope.

On 3 October 2017, it was announced that the new party would not contest seats where former Democrats were running as Party of Hope candidates, a gesture which was not returned when the Party of Hope ran a candidate in Edano's incumbent district. The Japanese Communist Party (JCP), in turn, pulled their own candidate from running in Edano's district so as to not take away votes from him. The party won a total of 55 seats, becoming the leading opposition party and leading the pacifist bloc (including the JCP and Social Democratic Party) to become the largest opposition bloc.

In July 2020, the CDP became an observer affiliate of the Council of Asian Liberals and Democrats.

=== 2020 merger and refoundation ===
On 19 August 2020, the CDP announced that it would merge with the majority of the Democratic Party For the People (DPP) as well as some independent Diet members in September of that year.

On 10 September 2020, the new party elected Edano as leader and voted to retain the CDP name. Following the merger, the new CDP had 149 members and held 107 seats in the House of Representatives, compared to 156 members and 96 seats held by the Democratic Party in 2016. The independents who joined the CDP in this merger included former Prime Minister Yoshihiko Noda. Several conservative DPP members, including DPP president Yuichiro Tamaki, did not join the CDP and instead continued to lead a rump DPP independent of the CDP.

On 14 November 2020, the Social Democratic Party (SDP) voted to agree to a merger arrangement with the CDP, allowing SDP members to leave the party and join the CDP. SDP leader Mizuho Fukushima was opposed to the merger agreement and as a result remained in the Social Democratic Party.

The CDP contested the 2021 general election in an electoral pact co-operating with the JCP, Reiwa Shinsengumi and continuing DPP and SDP parties in fielding single opposition candidates in single-seat constituencies. Edano resigned as party leader following the election on 2 November 2021, due to poorer than expected electoral results, in which the CDP fell from 110 to 96 seats.

Kenta Izumi was elected as the leader of the CDP in the 2021 Constitutional Democratic Party of Japan leadership election on 30 November 2021. Formerly a member of the DPP, he said that the two parties are regarded by the public as "close" and "thought to be like brothers" and "expressed support for a tie-up" between the two.

On 23 September 2024, former Prime Minister Yoshihiko Noda was elected party president on the party leadership election, with Junya Ogawa chosen as party general secretary.

In the 2024 general election held on 27 October 2024, the CDP greatly increased their seat count in the House of Representatives to 148, depriving the ruling Liberal Democratic Party of their majority.

=== 2026 attempted merger with Komeito ===
On 15 January 2026, CDP president Noda announced that the party had agreed to merge with Komeito in the lower-house to form the Centrist Reform Alliance. Only a handful of members, including Kazuhiro Haraguchi, left the party in protest; the vast majority of lawmakers joined the new party as planned. In the 2026 election, the CRA lost a significant number of seats, winning only 49 of them, while the LDP gained seats and secured more than a two-thirds majority of the lower house on its own. 21 CDP-affiliated candidates won seats, down from 144 before, while 28 Komeito-affiliated candidates won seats, up from 21 before.

In the 2026 Japanese local elections, the CDP and Komeito will field their own candidates instead of a unified CRA banner. In addition, the parties have not merged in the Senate.

== Ideology and platform ==
The CDP has been described as liberal and social-liberal, and in favour of constitutionalism. The party has also been described as centre-left, progressive, and left-wing populist. A study that quantitative textual analysis of the party's parliamentary speeches has shown that its political position is more left-leaning than that of its predecessor the Democratic Party. Following its enlargement in 2020, the party has variously been described as liberal, centrist, or centre-left. Within the CDP, as with its predecessor the Democratic Party of Japan (DPJ), there are conservative politicians, as well as politicians from social-democratic backgrounds.

A key characteristic of the CDP's policies, as its name suggests, is its respect for the Japan's postwar constitution which emphasizes democracy, human rights, and peace. The term "constitutionalism" was a slogan used in protest movement against the Abe administration's the legislation for Peace and Security and constitutional revision from 2015 to 2017, and the party adopted the term as its name. At launch in 2017, the CDP opposed the proposed revision of Article 9, and in the 2017 general election, it campaigned on a traditional Japanese liberal message of firmly opposing the revision of the peace constitution. The party supports the phasing out of nuclear energy in Japan, and government investment in renewable energy. The party does not support the legalization and maintenance of casinos. The party supports "building a society that supports each other and makes full use of individuality and creativity". In their 2017 political programme, the party expressed support for grassroots democracy and diplomatic pacifism. It supports electoral reform.

In 2019, the party pledged to support LGBT rights and the legalization of same-sex marriage in Japan, and in March 2023, promoted a parliamentary bill for Japan to legally recognize such couplings. It also supports increased gender equality.

The party supported a freeze in the increase of the consumption tax as of 2017, and supports a temporary consumption tax cut as of 2020, along with higher taxes on corporations and wealthy individuals. In the run-up to the 2021 general election, party leader Edano stated his party's support for redistribution of wealth. The 2021 election platform offered support for progressive taxation, a pledge for additional welfare payments for citizens on low incomes, and raising the capital gains tax rate to 25% by 2023.

The CDP's 2024 platform supported raising the minimum wage, the abolition of tuition fees, free school meals, gender equality legislation and reform of laws regulating use of surnames following marriage in Japan. The party also abandoned its previous policies of freezing or lowering the consumption tax rate.

The CDP released a statement on its official website in August 2025 in which it stated that there was a need to recognize Palestine as an independent country.

== Leadership ==
=== Party Leader ===
As the highest-ranking official representing the party and overseeing its affairs, the Leader is elected by a vote of Diet members, prospective candidates, local assembly members, and party members/supporters. The term runs until the end of September three years after the year of election, starting from the day they take office.

=== Acting Leader ===
The Acting Leader performs some of the duties of the Leader based on their instructions.

=== Deputy Leader ===
The Deputy Leader assists the Leader and carries out party affairs, based on the Leader's instructions, or upon the Secretary-general's request.

=== Secretary-general ===
The Secretary-General assists the Leader and oversees all aspects of party affairs execution; they may establish departments under their authority and appoint officers. They have an obligation to hear from regional organizations, local supporters, and party members.

=== Policy Research Council Chair ===
They are responsible for the party's policies as well as for their investigation, research, and drafting.

=== Current leadership ===
As of 25 February 2026. Only officials from the Senate remain due to the formation of the Centrist Reform Alliance.

Position	Name
President	Shunichi Mizuoka
Chairman in the Senate	Shunichi Mizuoka
Secretary-General	Masayo Tanabu
Chairman of the Standing Committee	Tadatomo Yoshida
Chairman of the Diet Affairs Committee	Yoshitaka Saitō
Chairman of the Election Strategy Committee	Shinji Morimoto
Chairman of the Policy Research Council	Eri Tokunaga

=== List of leaders ===
No.	Leader (birth–death)	Constituency	Took office	Left office	Election results
Split from: Democratic Party (2016) (centre-left)
1	Yukio Edano (b. 1964)	Rep for Saitama 5th	3 October 2017	14 September 2020	2017 Unopposed
Merger of: Democratic Party For the People (centre-right; majority faction) & Some Independents Group
1	Yukio Edano (b. 1964)	Rep for Saitama 5th	15 September 2020	12 November 2021	2020 (Note: Held after the merger with the Democratic Party For the People.) Yukio Edano – 107; Kenta Izumi – 42
2	Kenta Izumi (b. 1974)	Rep for Kyoto 3rd	30 November 2021	23 September 2024	2021 1st Round Kenta Izumi – 189; Seiji Osaka – 148; Junya Ogawa – 133; Chinami Nishimura – 102 2021 2nd Round Kenta Izumi – 205; Seiji Osaka – 128
3	Yoshihiko Noda (b. 1957)	Rep for Chiba 4th	23 September 2024	19 January 2026	2024 1st Round Yoshihiko Noda – 267; Yukio Edano – 206; Kenta Izumi – 143; Harumi Yoshida – 122 2024 2nd Round Yoshihiko Noda – 232; Yukio Edano – 180
House of Representatives group merges into Centrist Reform Alliance
4	Shunichi Mizuoka (b. 1956)	Senator for National PR	23 January 2026	Incumbent	

== Election results ==
=== House of Representatives ===
House of Representatives
Election	Leader	No. of candidates	Seats			Position	Constituency votes		PR Block votes		Status
Election	Leader	No. of candidates	No.	±	Share	Position	No.	Share	No.	Share	Status
2017	Yukio Edano	78	55 / 465		11.8%	2nd	4,852,097	8.75%	11,084,890	19.88%	Opposition
Merger of: Democratic Party For the People (centre-right; majority faction) & some Independents (2020)
2021	Yukio Edano	240	96 / 465		20.6%	2nd	17,215,621	29.96%	11,492,095	20.00%	Opposition
2024	Yoshihiko Noda	237	148 / 465	▲52	31.8%	2nd	15,740,860	29.01%	11,564,217	21.20%	Opposition
Merger with Komeito, forming the Centrist Reform Alliance (2026)

=== Senate ===
Senate
Election	Leader	No. of candidates	Seats				Position	Constituency votes		Party list votes		Status
Election	Leader	No. of candidates	Won	±	Total (Note: The Upper house is split in two classes, one elected every three years.)	±	Position	No.	Share	No.	Share	Status
2019	Yukio Edano	42	17 / 124		32 / 245		2nd	7,951,430	15.79%	7,917,720	15.81%	Opposition
Merger of: Democratic Party For the People (centre-right; majority faction) & some Independents (2020)
2022	Kenta Izumi	51	17 / 125		39 / 248		2nd	8,154,330	15.33%	6,771,914	12.77%	Opposition
2025	Yoshihiko Noda	51	22 / 125	▲5	38 / 248	▼1	2nd	9,119,656	15.42%	7,397,456	12.50%	Opposition

== See also ==
- Liberalism in Japan
- List of liberal parties
- Japan Socialist Party, the main opposition party in the "1955 System" against the LDP until the 1990s.
  - Right Socialist Party of Japan
  - Japan New Party
- Democratic Party of Japan
- List of major liberal parties considered centre-left
