= Kenta Izumi =

Japanese politician (born 1974)

- 泉 健太
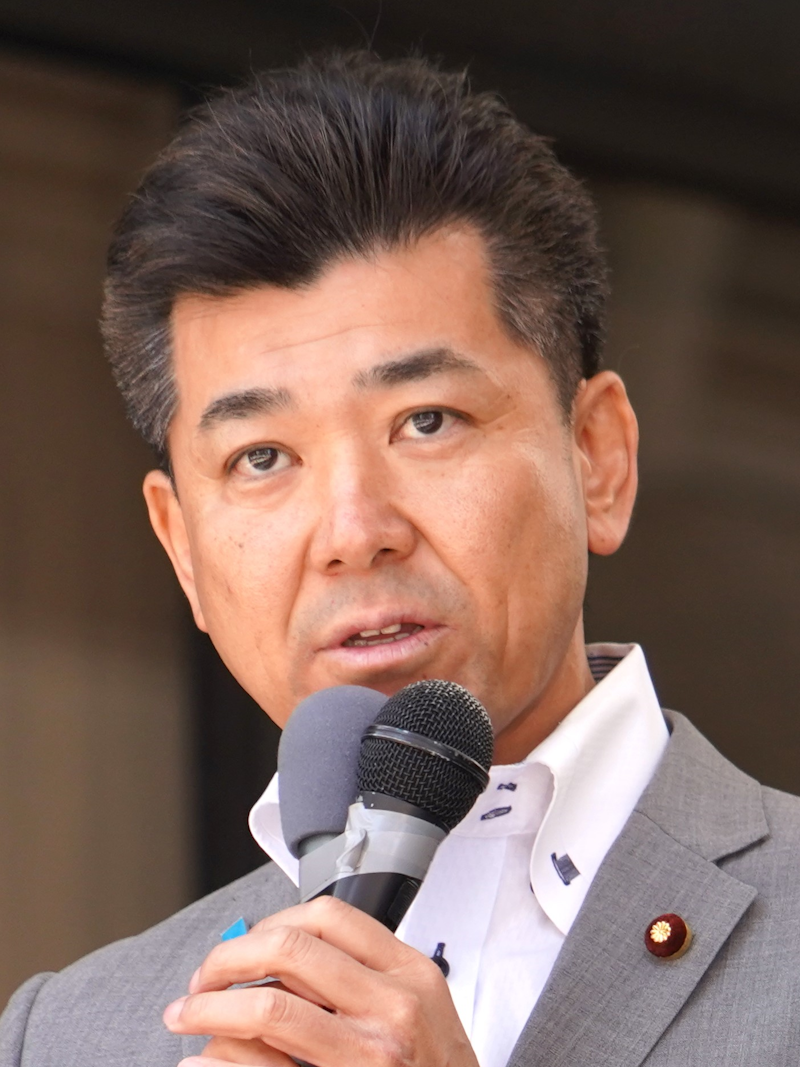
- Izumi in 2023

Leader of the Constitutional Democratic Party
- In office 30 November 2021 – 23 September 2024
- Deputy: Seiji Osaka; Chinami Nishimura; Kiyomi Tsujimoto
- Preceded by: Yukio Edano
- Succeeded by: Yoshihiko Noda

Parliamentary Vice-Minister of Cabinet Office
- In office 18 September 2009 – 17 September 2010; Serving with Kenji Tamura, Keisuke Tsumura
- Prime Minister: Yukio Hatoyama; Naoto Kan
- Preceded by: Osamu Uno; Masayoshi Namiki; Yoshiro Okamoto
- Succeeded by: Yukihiko Akutsu; Yasuhiro Sonoda; Takashi Wada

Member of the House of Representatives
- Incumbent
- Assumed office 26 April 2016
- Preceded by: Kensuke Miyazaki
- Constituency: Kyoto 3rd
- In office 10 November 2003 – 12 April 2016
- Preceded by: Shigefumi Okuyama
- Succeeded by: Keiro Kitagami
- Constituency: Kyoto 3rd (2003–2012); Kinki PR (2012–2016)

Personal details
- Born: 29 July 1974 (age 52) Sapporo, Hokkaido, Japan
- Party: Independent
- Other political affiliations: DPJ (2000–2016); DP (2016–2017); KnT (2017–2018); DFPP (2018–2020); CDP (2020–2026); CRA (2026)
- Education: Ritsumeikan University (LLB)
- Website: Official website

Kenta Izumi (泉 健太, Izumi Kenta; born 29 July 1974) is a Japanese politician who served as leader of the Constitutional Democratic Party of Japan (CDP) from 2021 to 2024. He is also a member of the House of Representatives in the National Diet, currently for the Kyoto 3rd district. He was first elected in 2000 under the Democratic Party of Japan. He served as Parliamentary Vice-Minister of the Cabinet Office from 2009 to 2010. After that, he served as chairman of the National Diet Measures Committee and Political Affairs Research Chairman of the Kibō no Tō, the Democratic Party for the People, and the Constitutional Democratic Party of Japan.

Izumi was born in Sapporo, Hokkaido, and was raised in Ishikari. After graduating from junior high and high school, he attended Ritsumeikan University Law School. While in university, he began to assist Kazunori Yamanoi, and, in 1996, when the Democratic Party formed, served as permanent secretary inside the Kyoto Prefecture. When he graduated from university in 1998, he became Tetsuro Fukuyama's secretary.

He ran as a candidate in the 2000 election for Kyoto-3, but lost, and did not win a seat proportionally. He ran again in 2003 election, and won. During the Democratic Party of Japan government's from 2009-2012, he served as Parliamentary Vice-Minister of the Cabinet Office and was in charge of the Administrative Reform Council. Although he lost his seat both in 2003 election and 2014 election, he won a seat proportionally both times, and won a by-election for the seat in 2016. When the Democratic Party split in 2017, he joined Kibō no Tō, where he served as the chairman of the National Assembly Committee from 2017 to 2018. In the Democratic Party for the People, which formed from a merger of Kibō no Tō and the Democratic Party, he served as the chairman of the National Assembly Committee in 2018 and the chairman of the Political Affairs Research Committee from 2018 to 2020.

In 2020, following the merger of the DPP into the CDP, he ran for leadership, but lost to Yukio Edano. He then became the party's Political Affairs Research Chairman. When Edano resigned as party leader following the results of the 2021 election, Izumi ran again in the leadership election and won, defeating Seiji Osaka and others to become party leader. Izumi formed the CDP's 'Next Cabinet' in September 2022 and became the shadow Prime Minister. Losses in the 2022 House of Councillors election and the 2023 by-elections saw Izumi lose party support, and despite victories in early 2024, he was defeated in the 2024 CDP leadership election. He was one of seven CRA representatives to win his district, Kyoto-3rd, in 2026 general election.

== Early life ==
Izumi was born on 29 July 1974, in Sapporo, Hokkaido. Izumi's family was self-employed in a ranch-related business. His father, Norio (Who died in 2011 at the age of 74), served as the neighborhood chairman, and later as a member of the Ishikari City Council. According to Kenta, his father was a conservative person, but when Kenta himself ran for the House of Representatives in 2000, his father switched to the Democratic Party of Japan.

Izumi lived in Izumi lived in Tonden, Kita-ku, Sapporo until he was about three years old, and then moved to Ishikari, where he lived until high school. His father was vocal about his own political opinions, and Izumi began to become curious about politics and elections in elementary school. After graduating from elementary school, Izumi entered Hanagawakita Junior High School. In junior high school, he belonged to the baseball club and served as the student council president. After graduating from junior high, he was planning to go to Sapporo Kita High School, but after seeing that Hokkaido Sapporo Kaisei High School participated in the Japanese High School Baseball Championship, he attended Kaisei instead. In high school, he again served on the baseball team and acted as student council president.

After graduating from high school, he entered the Ritsumeikan University School of Law. When he returned to Hokkaido during the summer vacation after his first year at university, a rally was held for the "New Wind Hokkaido Conference"; it was established by Takahiro Yokomichi, who served as Governor of Hokkaido, in preparation for his return to national politics. Izumi pointed out to Yokomichi the lack of young people at the rally. According to Izumi, about two days later, Yokomichi called his parents house, asking if he could speak with Izumi. This began his serious connection to politics. When Izumi returned to Kyoto for university, he visited the Japan Socialist Party Kyoto Prefectural Federation, but was told by executives there he had no future inside the party. Thereafter, he began assisting Kazunori Yamanoi, a lecturer at Ritsumeikan, with his political activities (Yamanoi would go on to become a representative of the Democratic Party). Yamanoi also introduced him to Tetsuro Fukuyama.

When the Democratic Party formed in 1996, Izumi served as permanent secretary of the Democratic Party in the Kyoto Prefecture. During the Kyoto mayoral election held in the same year, he organized a lecture event inviting candidates to speak. He was in the debate club at Ritsumeikan, and also served as President of the "Student Speech and Debate Exchange Group", a cross-university debate club. During the Nakhodka heavy oil spill accident, which was a result of a Russian taker crash off the coast of the Oki Islands, he chartered two buses to assist in the recovery effort and volunteered in heavy oil cleanup. He also worked as a staff member for an environmental NGO at the COP3 event held in the same year.

== Early career ==
After graduating from university in 1998, Izumi became Tetsuro Fukuyama's secretary. After a while, he had retired from his secretary job and had received a job offer from a private company. He was persuaded by Seiji Maehara and others to instead run in the 2000 Japanese general election, specifically for Kyoto's third ward. However, he was defeated by Shigehiko Okuyama and the LDP, and was unable to make a proportional comeback. After his defeat, he returned to his previous political activities while working part-time as a daycare worker and elderly caretaker.

In 2003, he ran again for the third ward and was elected for the first time, defeating Okuyama. He was re-elected in the 2005 election, defeating Koichiro Shimizu of the LDP and others. Izumi belonged to the Ryounkai, otherwise known as the Maehara group. He was an endorser of Maehara when he ran and won against Naoto Kan for DPJ leadership.

In February 2008, during his second term, he worked with Taro Kono, Masahiko Shibayama, Kenichi Mizuno, and Koichi Yamauchi of the LDP along with Sumio Mabuchi and Goshi Hosono of the DPJ to introduce new rules regarding the operation of the Diet, including a year-round Diet session. In May of the same year, he also proposed a law to give compensation to former BC-class war criminals from Taiwan and the Korean Peninsula. In Yukio Hatoyama's "NEXT Cabinet", roughly equivalent to shadow governments, Izumi was named Deputy Minister of the Cabinet Office.

== In the Democratic Party administration (2009-2011) ==
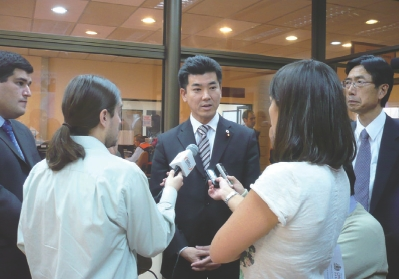
Izumi being interviewed after inspecting the 2010 Chile earthquake

Izumi defeated Koichiro Shimizu again in the 2009 election, in which the Democratic Party of Japan won a majority and ascended Yukio Hatoyama to become prime minister. In the Hatoyama Cabinet, Izumi was appointed Parliamentary Vice-Minister of the Cabinet Office and became head of the Administrative Reform Council which was formed by Hatoyama. He also became the leader of the Food SOS Response Project, which was launched by the Consumer Affairs Agency to address health issues such as Econa, an edible coconut oil which had concerns over its safety for human consumption.

In the first Kan Cabinet that was established in June of 2010, Izumi was reappointed as Parliamentary Vice-Minister of the Cabinet Office. After the first Kan Cabinet, he served as a director of the Budget Committee. In the 2011 Democratic Party of Japan leadership election, which was won by Yoshihiko Noda, Izumi was again one of Seiji Maehara's endorsers. Maehara finished third.

== Post-2012 Democratic Party years ==
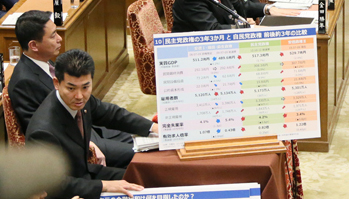
Izumi asking questions to the Budget Committee (February 2016)

In the 2012 election, which ended the DPJ's brief stay in power by a landslide, Izumi lost to Kensuke Miyazaki in the third ward. This was the first defeat Izumi suffered since the 2000 election within the ward. Nevertheless, he was revived on the Kinki proportional representation block. In September 2013, he became chairman of the Democratic National Movement Committee. In February 2014, he was elected chairman of the Kyoto Prefectural Democratic Party Federation. Izumi lost to Miyazaki again in 2014, but was again revived on the Kinki proportional block, winning a fifth term.

In the 2015 Democratic Party leadership election, Izumi endorsed Goshi Hosono, who narrowly lost to Katsuya Okada.

In April 2016, in an attempt to return to his former district, Izumi ran in the 2016 Kyoto 3rd district by-election under the newly reformed Democratic Party, after Kensuke Miyazaki resigned due to allegations of an affair. Since the LDP did not run a candidate, he won by a 40 point margin, capturing a safe majority of 65.42% against his closest opponent, a member of Nippon Ishin no Kai. (Note: As a result of running in the by-election, Izumi briefly resigned his seat during the campaigning period.) After his victory, Izumi became the chairman of the Kyoto Prefectural Democratic Party. In the 2017 Democratic Party leadership election, he backed Maehara and served as secretary-general for his campaign office.

== Kibō no Tō and DPP (2017-2020) ==
In the 2017 general election, in which the Democratic Party effectively split into the Constitutional Democratic Party of Japan and Kibō no Tō, Izumi joined Kibō no Tō along with Seiji Maehara. He ran in his own ward as a member of the party, defeating Yayoi Kimura from the LDP and others. He considered running for co-representative of the new party, but gave up due to the difficulty of gathering nominations. After the representative election, Izumi was appointed as the head of the National Diet Committee. In May of 2018, the Democratic Party for the People was formed by Yuichiro Tamaki as a merger of the remaining members of the Democratic Party and Kibō no Tō. Izumi joined the new party, and was subsequently appointed as chairman of the National Assembly task force for the party. He also served as Chairperson for Political Affairs Research.

== Joining the CDP and leadership election (2020-2021) ==
In 2020, the DPP and SDP merged (Note: Most party members from both merged into the CDP. A few members from both, such as Yuichiro Tamaki and Mizuho Fukushima lead splinters who refused to merge.) into the Constitutional Democratic Party of Japan (Note: The CDP (2017-2020) and CDP (2020-) are, by a technicality, different entities.) Izumi merged and joined the CDP, running in the leadership election which occurred afterwards. In the leadership election, he faced Yukio Edano, who served as party leader before the merger. Izumi advocated clarifying the vision of the CDP, establishing a more policy focused opposition party, and managing the party in an open manner. He also proposed that the party be renamed to the "Democratic Party", in a member vote that was happening at the same time as the leadership election. Izumi was ultimately defeated by a wide margin, and the party was named "Constitutional Democratic Party", as advocated for by Edano.

After the election, Izumi was appointed as the chairman of the Political Affairs Research Committee. He also established the "New Government Study Group", also known as the "Izumi Group", which was mostly made up of former members of the DP and DPP. He became its chairman.

== CDP Representative (2021-2024) ==
=== CDP leadership election ===
In the 2021 election, the seats held by the CDP slid from 108 to 96, and Yukio Edano resigned to take responsibility. Izumi ran for party leader again following this, competing with three others; Seiji Osaka, Junya Ogawa, and Chinami Nishimura. Recommendations for him came from the Izumi Group, the Naojo no Kai, a group of young party members, and Ichiro Ozawa's own party faction. Izumi came first in the first round with 33.0% of member votes, but was forced into a runoff with Seiji Osaka, who was closer to Edano during his time as party leader. In the second round, he won with 61.6% of votes, despite an attempt by Ogawa and Nishimura to unify behind Osaka.

=== Party leadership ===
Izumi, who was appointed as the representative, appointed Osaka as the Deputy Leader, Nishimura as the secretary-general, and Ogawa as the Policy Research Chair to form a new executive committee. In addition, Sumio Mabuchi was appointed as the Chairman of the National Relations Committee, and Kensuke Onishi was appointed as the chairman of the Election Committee. In addition, he resigned as chairman of the Izumi Group when he became the leader. Izumi has made it clear that he will be less confrontational with the government and will change the party's image to one that is more "proposal-orientated" than opposition focused. owever, there was dissatisfaction within the party that the party was abandoning its role as a pure opposition party, and in the 2022 representative question, the party attempted to change course to balance pursuit and proposal.

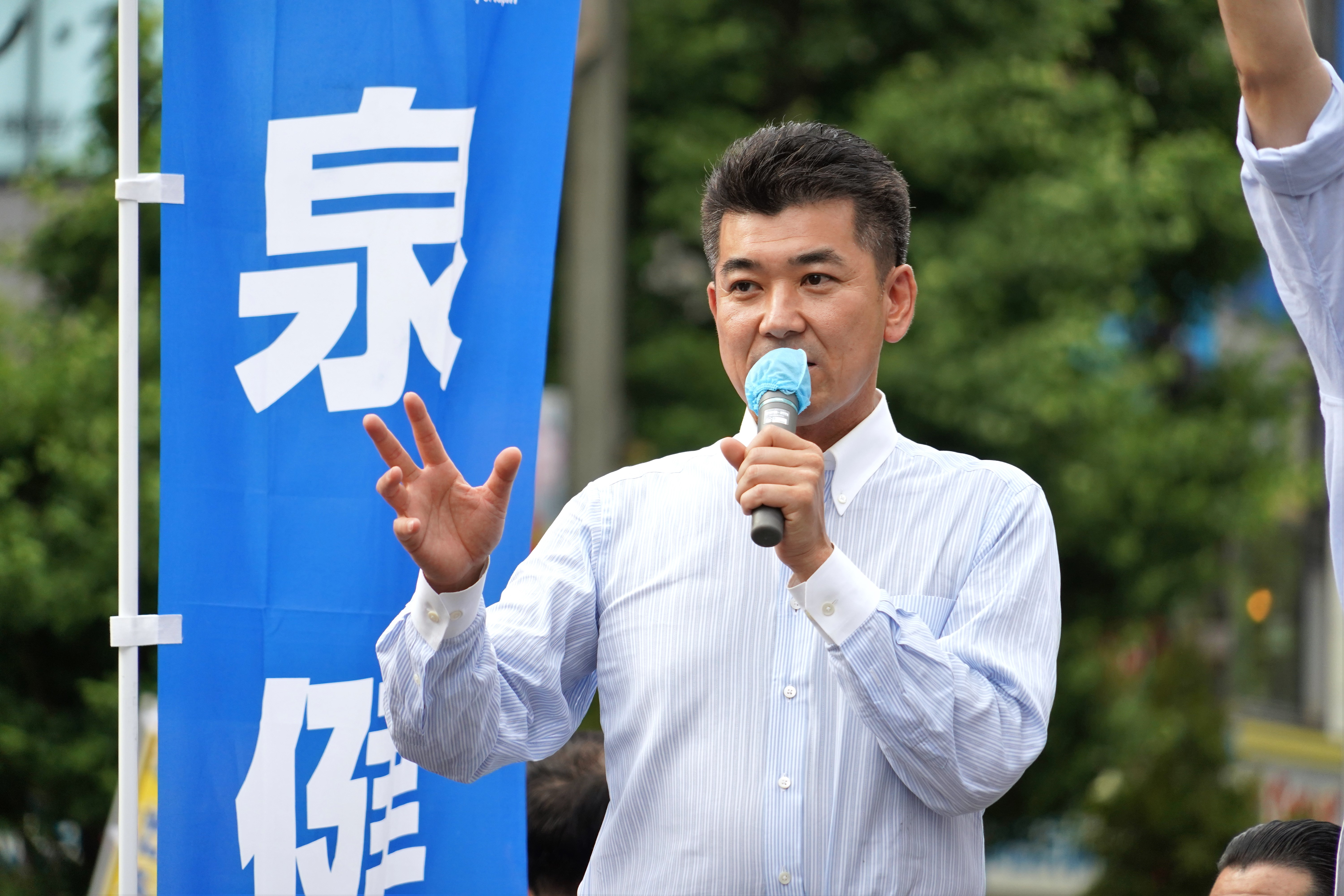
Izumi giving a street speech, June 2022

In the 2022 House of Councilors election, where the CDP took a policy focused approach, the party lost six seats, and in terms of proportional representation, received less votes than Nippon Ishin no Kai. There were calls within the party for Izumi to resign as leader, but he blunted these, deciding to stay on. Izumi also revamped his executive council, bringing on Katsuya Okada as secretary-general, Akira Nagatsuma as chairman of the Policy Research Council, and Jun Azumi as chairman of the National Relations Committee, all experienced politicians who assisted the Democratic Party of Japan and served in the 2009-2012 governments. In addition, the party switched from its prior policy focused approach to returning to confrontation with the government, and began to cooperate in the Diet with Nippon Ishin no Kai.

In September 2022, he also re-established the "NEXT Cabinet" system of naming government ministers for a possible CDP lead government. His named appointments were a mix of former ministers of the DPJ governments as well as younger members of the party, including Akira Nagatsuma becoming Chief Cabinet Secretary, and Kōichirō Genba being named as the Minister for Foreign Affairs. Five of the thirteen named were women.

The 2023 by-elections saw the party struggle further, as the party lost all five constituencies including an independent it had supported. More calls for resignation led to him promising that if the party didn't win over 150 seats in the next general election, he'd resign as leader. Later by-elections in October saw the victory of Hajime Hirota in the Tokushima-Kōchi at-large district, marking Izumi's first win in a by-election.

The 2024 by-elections saw the CDP sweep all four elections, resulting in a perfect victory. As his term expired in late 2024, he expressed interest in running again, but struggled to gather endorsements. Ichiro Ozawa, who had backed Izumi in the previous election, had disputed with Izumi over party appointments while he was in office. Yoshihiko Noda also ran using a similar platform appealing to centrist and conservative elements, which undermined Izumi's own support base. Four candidates including Izumi ran, but Izumi struggled to gather support. He ended up placing third, and did not make it to the second round of voting. Izumi commented that "I can't lie, I'm disappointed, but I will support Noda no matter what. i want to support and create a new form of politics." He was appointed as a permanent advisor to the party on 1 October.

== Later career ==
He was re-elected in the 2024 election by a margin of 25 points. On 13 November, he became Chairman of the House of Representatives Committee on Basic National Policy. In August of 2025, he became Representative of the Kyoto Prefectural Chapter of the CDP following Tetsuro Fukuyama becoming Vice Speaker of the House of Councillors. He became chair of the House of Representatives Environmental Committee in October.

On 20 January, he announced his participation in the Centrist Reform Alliance. In the following election, he ran in his district of Kyoto 3rd under the party. He narrowly defeated Mamoru Shigemoto by a margin of six thousand votes and just 3%, allowing Mamoru to be proportionally revived. He became just one of seven CRA representatives to win a single member district.

When the Centrist Reform Alliance disbanded in September, Izumi criticised the decision to leave one member to receive party subsidies. He declined to join the Democratic Reform Party formed by other former CDP representatives and became an independent. He formed a new parliamentary faction Shishi no Kai (志士の会) with independent Rintaro Ogata and became its leader.

== Political views ==
Izumi has been described as centrist and conservative, but describes himself as a centrist liberal and progressive.

=== Constitutional revision ===
Regarding the pros and cons of constitutional revision, Izumi answered an Asahi Shimbun survey during the 2003 election by saying that "If anything, it should be revised." Another one conducted during the 2005 election gave a response by him that this ideal should continue to be shared by the Japanese people, but also that it was important to revise the constitution in line with the new era.

In another survey conducted before the 2012 election, he responded and stated the need for environmental and privacy rights, the supremacy of the House of Representatives, and the need to enshrine the Japan Self-Defense Forces in Article 9 of the Japanese Constitution. One collected before 2017 had him state the need to advance the debate on constitutional revision.

However, on a conducted one by the Mainichi Shimbun before the 2021 elections, he responded that he was opposed to the possibility of a constitutional amendment. In the NHK survey, he was undecided.

=== Diplomacy ===
Before 2017, he supported enacting the Territorial Security Act, amending the Critical Situations Act and the PKO Act, and strengthening intelligence capabilities and the National Security Council. In a survey in 2021, he advocated participating as an observer in the Treaty on the Prohibition of Nuclear Weapons, and called for Japan to "pave the way" on the issue. He is also a strong supporter of Ukraine in the Russo-Ukrainian War, saying Fumio Kishida should "reflect the urgency of the war."

Regarding diplomatic relations with China, he advocates continuing the government's policy.

=== Security ===
Regarding the right to collective self-defense, he stated in 2014 he was opposed to the right for individual self-defense and wished for greater clarification on the Japan-U.S Security Treaty. In 2021, he spoke his opposition to the idea of gaining the ability to attack enemy bases, and spoke similarly on the topic in a 2023 House of Representatives question.

In January 2022, he joined a "Self-Defenses Forces Supporters League" inside the Constitutional Democratic Party.

=== Economics ===
Regarding the Consumption Tax, Izumi responded to a 2017 survey that he would support raising the consumption tax over 10% in the long term.

=== Energy ===
Regarding nuclear energy, he responded in 2012 that restarting nuclear power plants were unavoidable due to the need for a stable power source. In 2021, however, he changed his position, stating that nuclear power plants are not necessary. He further answered an NHK survey and said that renewable energy should be Japan's primary power source.

=== Gender rights ===
Regarding gay marriage, Izumi in 2017 pledged his support for the issue, and further reinforced this in 2021 in both Asahi and NHK surveys. He also supports separate surnames for married couples, responding in 2017 he was somewhat in favor while stating in 2021 he was in favor.

== Notes ==
House of Representatives (Japan)
Preceded by Kensuke Miyazaki	Member of the House of Representatives from Kyoto 3rd district 2016–	Incumbent
Preceded by N/A	Member of the House of Representatives from Kinki proportional representation block 2012–2014	Succeeded by N/A
Preceded by Shigehiko Okuyama	Member of the House of Representatives from Kyoto 3rd district 2003–2012	Succeeded by Kensuke Miyazaki
Preceded by Takumi Nemoto	Chairman of the Committee on Fundamental National Policies; 2024–2025	Succeeded by Junya Ogawa
Preceded by Shoichi Kondo	Chairman of the Committee on the Environment; 2025–2026	Succeeded by Takuma Miyaji
Political offices
Preceded by Osamu Uno; Yoshiro Okamoto; Masayoshi Namiki	Parliamentary Vice-Minister of Cabinet Office; 2009–2010; Served alongside: Kenji Tamura, Keisuke Tsumura	Succeeded by Yukihiko Akutsu; Yasuhiro Sonoda; Takashi Wada
Party political offices
New political party	Chairman of the Policy Research Council, Constitutional Democratic Party; 2020–2021	Succeeded by Junya Ogawa
Preceded by Yukio Edano	President of the Constitutional Democratic Party; 2021–2024	Succeeded by Yoshihiko Noda
