= 2020 Constitutional Democratic Party of Japan presidential election =

Political party election in Japan

- 10 September 2020
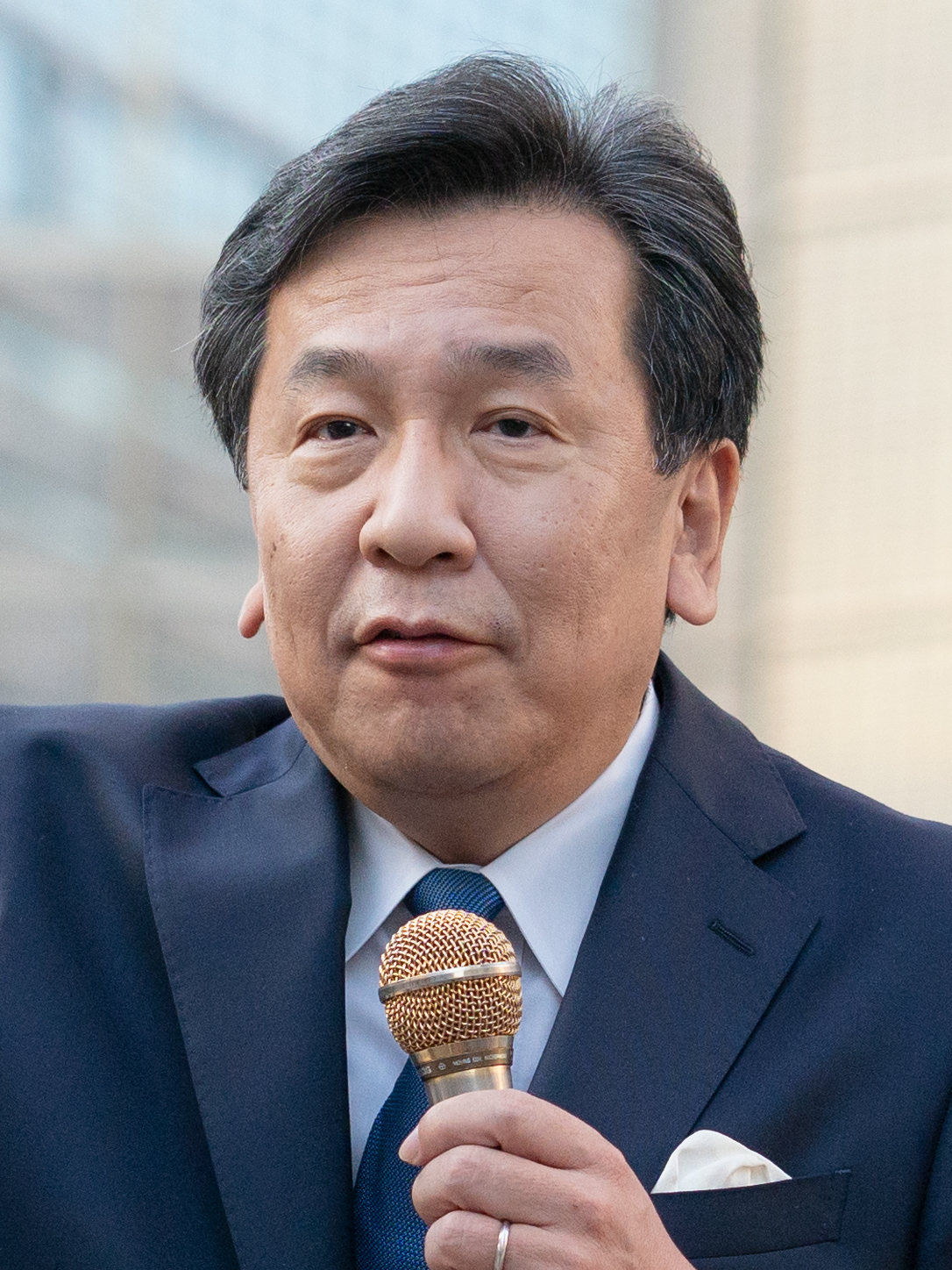

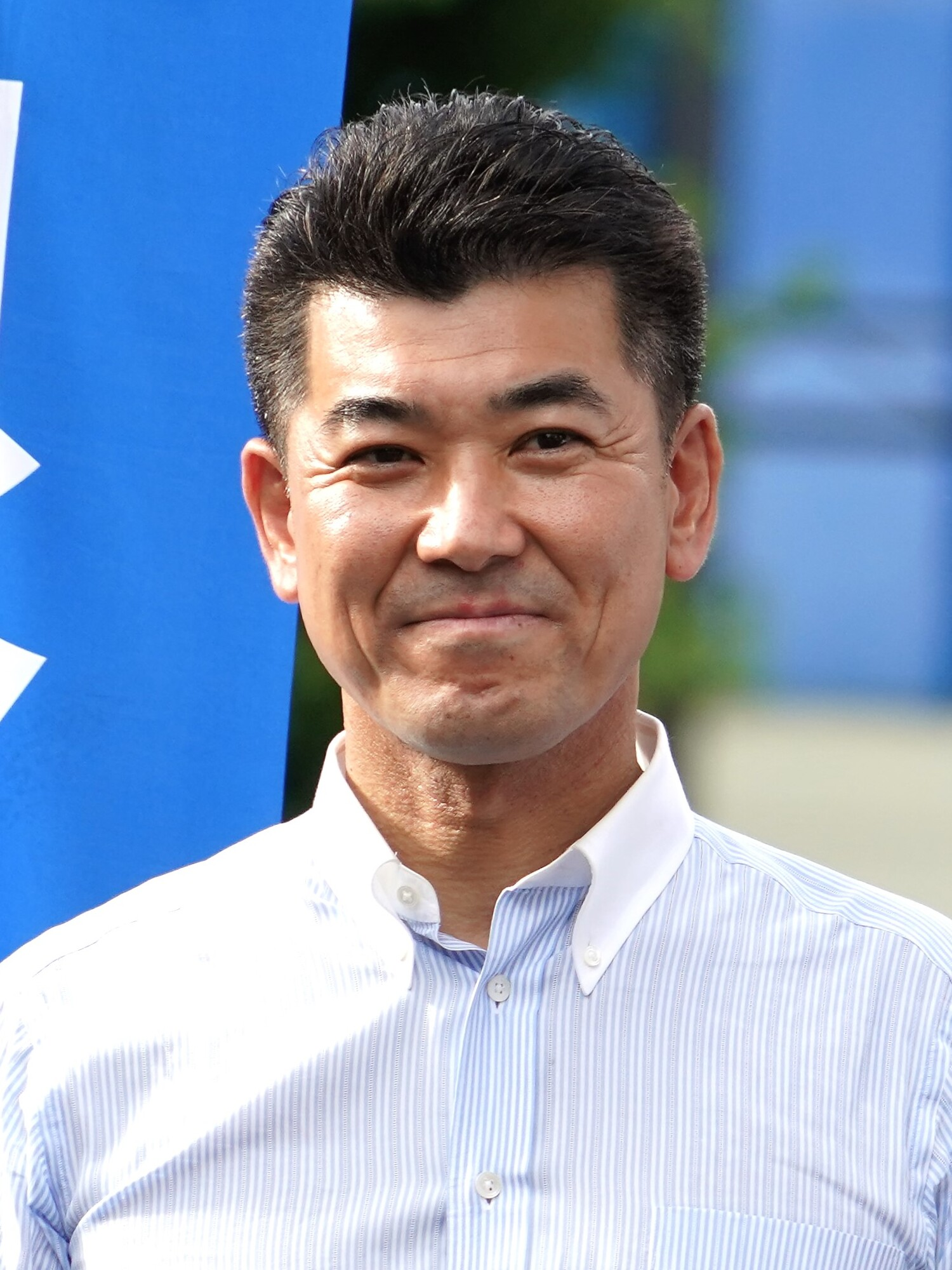
| Candidate | Yukio Edano | Kenta Izumi |
| Leader's seat | Saitama 5th | Kyoto 3rd |
| Caucus vote | 107 | 42 |
| Percentage | 71.8% | 28.2% |
Leader before election
Yukio Edano
Elected Leader
Yukio Edano

The 2020 Constitutional Democratic Party of Japan presidential election was held on 10 September 2020. The president of the first incarnation of the Constitutional Democratic Party, Yukio Edano, defeated Kenta Izumi by a wide margin.

== Background ==
The Constitutional Democratic Party (CDP) was created ahead of the 2017 election as a split from the major opposition Democratic Party. The aftermath of the election saw the party split three ways between the CDP, Kibō no Tō, and the rump DP. The latter two merged in May 2018 to create the Democratic Party For the People (DPFP), but remained smaller than the CDP. In addition, a number of former Democrats remained independents and formed their own group in the House of Representatives. Further efforts were made in 2019 and 2020 to unify the opposition. The CDP and DPFP held unsuccessful negotiations to merge in late 2019. A breakthrough came after renewed negotiations in July 2020, with the secretaries-general of both parties signing a merger agreement on 24 August. Most of the independent members, including Yoshihiko Noda, Katsuya Okada, and Junya Ogawa, also agreed to join the new party. A minority of the DPFP, led by party leader Yuichiro Tamaki, refused to join and founded a new rump DPFP.

The new party's founding conference was scheduled for 15 September. The joint CDP-DPFP management committee announced that a leadership election and vote on the party's name would be held prior to the conference, with nominations to be taken on the 7th followed by the election on the 10th. The ballots were to be held only among Diet members. 149 members were eligible to vote, including 88 former CDP members, 40 formerly from the DPFP, and 21 former independents.

== Candidates and contest ==
Edano and Izumi each announced their candidacy on 4 September. Edano was the outgoing president of the CDP, while Izumi was head of the Policy Research Council of the DPFP. Both had served in the DPJ governments of 2009–12.

Edano pledged to end the division of the opposition and create a viable party of government, while Izumi spoke of being "the leading opposition party". He advocated for "proposal-based, centrist reform politics" and endorsed the name "Democratic Party" for the new party. He called for a temporary freeze on the consumption tax for the duration of the COVID-19 pandemic, free vaccinations, and a raise in the child allowance. He also supported cooperation with the new DPFP, including a joint parliamentary group. In response to criticism of Edano's heavy-handed leadership style, Izumi voiced his desire for transparent management and open debate in the party. Edano acknowledged the value of internal debate, but asserted that "firm leadership" was needed to prevent public infighting. He also supported the name "Constitutional Democratic Party".

Each candidate gathered 25 sponsors. Edano's sponsors consisted of 19 members of the CDP, four independents, and two DPFP members; Izumi's consisted of 21 DPFP members and four independents, with no sponsors from the CDP. Hirotaka Akamatsu's faction, the largest group in the merged membership, supported Edano. He was also backed by Ichirō Ozawa and his allies. His sponsors included Ozawa, former Prime Ministers Yoshihiko Noda and Naoto Kan, Junya Ogawa, and former DP leader Renhō.

| Candidate | Offices held |
|---|---|
| Yukio Edano (age 56); Saitama Prefecture | Member of the House of Representatives (1993–); President of the Constitutional Democratic Party (2017–); Chief Cabinet Secretary (2011); Minister of Economy, Trade and Industry (2011–12) |
| Kenta Izumi (age 46); Kyoto Prefecture | Member of the House of Representatives (2003–); Parliamentary Secretary in the Cabinet Office (2009–10) |

=== Sponsors ===
| Yukio Edano (25) | Kenta Izumi (25) |
|---|---|
| House of Representatives: Kenji Eda; Keinin Horikoshi; Kaori Ishikawa; Akiko Kamei; Naoto Kan; Masako Ōkawara; Hiroshi Kawauchi; Shoichi Kondo; Yoshio Maki; Chinami Nishimura; Yoshihiko Noda; Junya Ogawa; Seiji Osaka; Ichirō Ozawa; Takahiro Sasaki; Koji Sato; Norio Takeuchi; Kiyomi Tsujimoto; Masayoshi Yagami; House of Councillors: Takashi Esaki; Shunichi Mizuoka; Takashi Moriya; Hiroyuki Nagahama; Masahito Ozawa; Renhō | House of Representatives: Yamato Aoyama; Kentaro Genma; Yuichi Goto; Hirofumi Hirano; Takashi Kii; Kazuya Kondo; Takashi Midorikawa; Toshikazu Morita; Shinji Oguma; Kensuke Onishi; Atsushi Oshima; Kazuhiko Shigetoku; Mitsu Shimojo; Takeshi Shina; Takashi Shinohara; Yoichi Shiraishi; Manabu Terata; Keisuke Tsumura; Shu Watanabe; House of Councillors: Akira Gunji; Yuichiro Hata; Yukihito Koga; Shinji Morimoto; Masayo Tanabu; Eri Tokunaga |

== Results ==
| Candidate | Votes | % |
|---|---|---|
| Yukio Edano | 107 | 71.8 |
| Kenta Izumi | 42 | 28.2 |
| Total | 149 | 100.0 |
| Invalid | 0 | |
| Turnout | 149 | 100.0 |
| Eligible | 149 | |
Source: The Japan Times

=== Party name vote ===
Alongside the presidential election, the party caucus voted on which name the party should take. Two main options were presented: to retain the name Rikken Minshutō (Constitutional Democratic Party) or adopt the name Minshutō (Democratic Party), the same used by the former Democratic Party of Japan. The latter option was preferred by many former DPFP members, including Izumi. A comfortable majority voted for "Constitutional Democratic Party".

| Name | Votes | % |
|---|---|---|
| 立憲民主党; Constitutional Democratic Party | 94 | 63.1 |
| 民主党; Democratic Party | 54 | 36.2 |
| Other | 1 | 0.7 |
| Total | 149 | 100.0 |
| Invalid | 0 | |
| Turnout | 149 | 100.0 |
| Eligible | 149 | |
Source: The Japan Times
