= Toshiko Karasawa =

Japanese politician and labor activist

- 柄沢 とし子
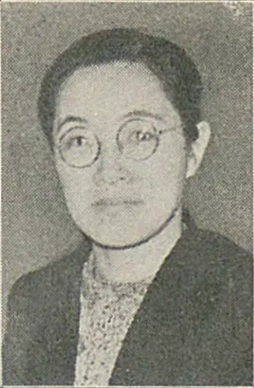
- Karasawa in 1947

Member of the House of Representatives
- In office 23 January 1949 – 28 August 1952
- Preceded by: Hiroshi Yamanaka
- Succeeded by: Hiroshi Yamanaka
- Constituency: Hokkaido 4th
- In office 11 April 1946 – 31 March 1947
- Preceded by: Constituency established
- Succeeded by: Constituency abolished
- Constituency: Hokkaido 1st

Personal details
- Born: 7 May 1911 Sapporo, Hokkaido, Japan
- Died: 2 December 2013 (aged 102) Toyama City, Toyama, Japan
- Party: Communist
- Education: Hokkaido Prefectural Sapporo Girls' High School

Toshiko Karasawa (Japanese: 柄沢とし子; 7 May 1911 – 2 December 2013) was a Japanese politician for the Japanese Communist Party (JCP) and labor activist. Born in Sapporo on the island Hokkaido, Karasawa graduated from Sapporo Kita High School in 1929, and served two terms as a representative for her party for the House of Representatives, in 1946 and 1949, before retiring soon after. Karasawa died of natural causes on 2 December 2013, aged 102, at a health care facility in Toyama, Toyama.
