= Yukio Edano =

Japanese politician

- 枝野 幸男
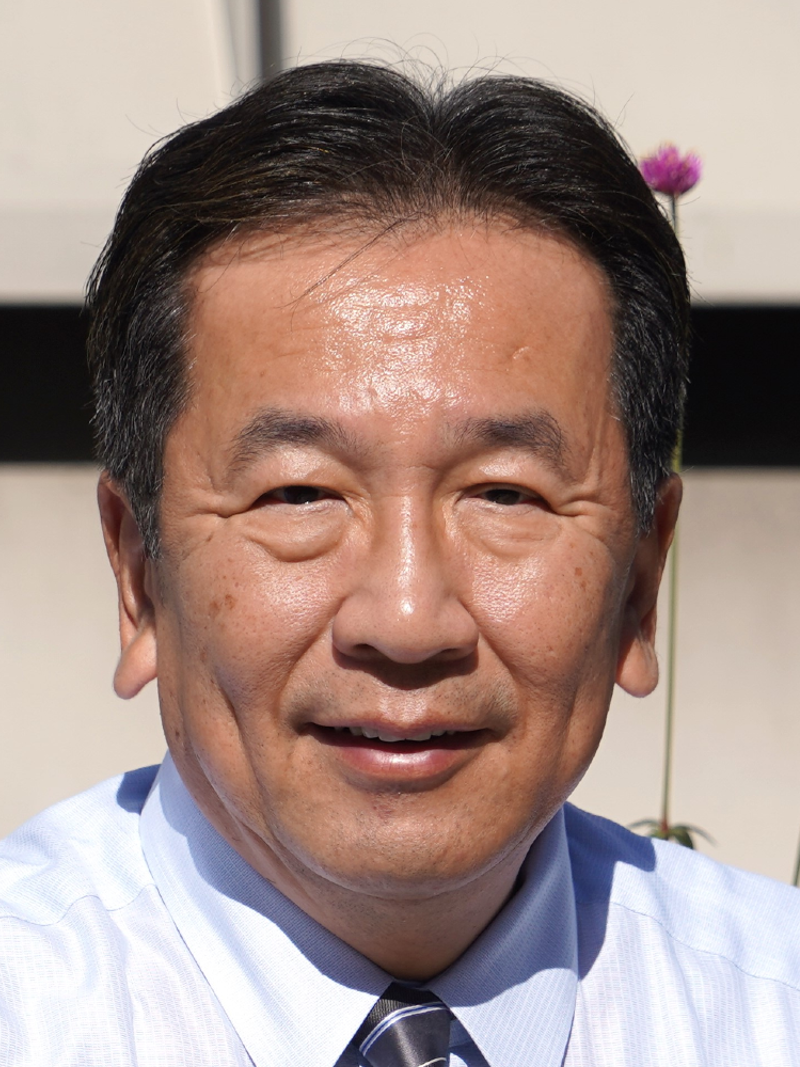
- Edano in 2024

Leader of the Constitutional Democratic Party
- In office 2 October 2017 – 12 November 2021
- Deputy: Akira Nagatsuma
- Preceded by: Position established
- Succeeded by: Kenta Izumi
Ministerial offices
Minister of Economy, Trade and Industry
In office 12 September 2011 – 26 December 2012
Prime Minister	Yoshihiko Noda
Preceded by	Yoshio Hachiro
Succeeded by	Toshimitsu Motegi
Chief Cabinet Secretary
In office 4 January 2011 – 2 September 2011
Prime Minister	Naoto Kan
Preceded by	Yoshito Sengoku
Succeeded by	Osamu Fujimura
Minister of State for Government Revitalisation
In office 27 June 2011 – 2 September 2011
Prime Minister	Naoto Kan
Preceded by	Renhō
Succeeded by	Renhō
In office 10 February 2010 – 8 June 2010
Prime Minister	Yukio Hatoyama
Preceded by	Yoshito Sengoku
Succeeded by	Renhō
Minister of State for Okinawa and Northern Territories Affairs
In office 14 January 2011 – 2 September 2011
Prime Minister	Naoto Kan
Preceded by	Sumio Mabuchi
Succeeded by	Tatsuo Kawabata
Minister of Foreign Affairs
In office 7 March 2011 – 9 March 2011
Prime Minister	Naoto Kan
Preceded by	Seiji Maehara
Succeeded by	Takeaki Matsumoto

Member of the House of Representatives; from Northern Kanto
- In office 19 July 1993 – 23 January 2026
- Preceded by: Multi-member district
- Succeeded by: Yutaka Ihara
- Constituency: Former Saitama 5th (1993–1996); PR block (1996–2000); Saitama 5th (2000–2026)

Personal details
- Born: 31 May 1964 (age 62) Utsunomiya, Tochigi, Japan
- Party: CRA (since 2026)
- Other political affiliations: JNP (1992–1994); NPS (1994–1998); DPJ (1998–2016); DP (2016–2017); CDP (2017–2026)
- Spouse: Kazuko Edano
- Children: 2
- Education: Tohoku University
- Website: www.edano.gr.jp

Yukio Edano (枝野 幸男, Edano Yukio; born 31 May 1964) is a Japanese politician who served as the leader of the Constitutional Democratic Party of Japan from its formation in 2017 until 2021.

He has served in various significant political roles, including the 3rd Policy Research Council Chairperson of the former Democratic Party of Japan, the 6th Policy Research Council Chairperson of the Democratic Party, the 140th Minister for Foreign Affairs, the Minister of State for Okinawa and Northern Territories Affairs, the 16th Minister of Economy, Trade and Industry, the Minister of State for the Nuclear Damage Compensation and Decommissioning Facilitation Corporation, the inaugural Secretary-General of the Democratic Party for the People, the inaugural leader of the former Constitutional Democratic Party of Japan, the inaugural leader of the Constitutional Democratic Party of Japan, and the Chairperson of the House of Representatives Committee on Audit and Oversight of Administration.

He was elected to parliament in the 1993 Japanese general election under the Japan New Party, and served briefly in the governments of Morihiro Hosokawa, Tsutomu Hata, Tomiichi Murayama, and the first Ryutaro Hashimoto cabinet before leaving the New Party Sakigake to join the Democratic Party in 1998. He then held various roles inside the party, and upon the group's landslide victory in the 2009 election, served roles in all three opposition cabinets. He was a major part of the response to the 2011 Tōhoku earthquake and tsunami.

Following the defeat of the Democratic Party in 2012, he held his seat in parliament, and joined the various opposition groups that formed around the time, including the 2016 form of the Democratic Party. With his attempt to join Kibō no Tō being blocked by Yuriko Koike's refusal to let liberal members of the former Democratic Party inside the group, he left to form the Constitutional Democratic Party of Japan for liberal factions of the former party, which he led to a surprising second-place finish in the 2017 Japanese general election.

Following the CDP's poor performance in the 2021 general election, Edano announced on 2 November his intention to resign as leader of the party, triggering a leadership election.

== Early life ==
Edano was born in Utsunomiya on 31 May 1964, into a salary-man family. He is named after Japanese progressive liberal political figure Yukio Ozaki, who Edano's father admired. He attended Utsunomiya City Mine Elementary School and Utsunomiya City Yoto Junior High School, serving as the student council president at both. Edano graduated from Tohoku University with a degree in law, and passed the Japanese bar examination at the age of 24.

== Early political career ==
In 1992, Morihiro Hosokawa founded the Japan New Party. Edano, who had found a job in Tokyo as a lawyer, found himself drawn to Hosokawa's words of idealism and anti-corruption, as Edano had maintained an interest in politics since he was young. After the New Party announced an open call for candidates to the Japanese House of Representatives before the 1993 general election, Edano applied to become a candidate for the party. After the JNP had screened down 150 candidates to about 15 people, Edano had passed, and it was soon after announced he would be the JNPs candidate for the Saitama 5th district.

He initially struggled; lacking funding, political experience, and a rushed schedule due to his initial expectation for the House to be dissolved in the fall instead of June, he resorted to delivering speeches on the side of the road in the morning, a similar strategy to that used by Yoshihiko Noda. He placed second but was still elected, falling slightly behind Kiyoshi Ueda.

After the election, the Hosokawa Cabinet, the first since the 1950s not to include the LDP, was formed. Edano became a member of the Commerce and Industry Committee, and helped to craft a Product Liability Act. However, the Hosokawa Cabinet was cut short by a campaign finance scandal which led to the collapse of the cabinet, and Hosokawa resigned. He voted for Tsutomu Hata in the next prime minister election, believing the LDP should be blocked from forming a government at all costs. Following this, Edano opposed the formation of a new parliamentary group made up of all parties outside of the Socialists and LDP, and thus left the JNP to form his own parliamentary group briefly, known as "Democratic Wind". He shortly after joined the New Party Sakigake, and opposed the motion of no confidence against Prime Minister Tsutomu Hata, which divided the Sakigake group.

In 1994, the Murayama Cabinet, a coalition between the LDP, the JSP, and Edano's own group, the NPS, was formed. He became vice chairman of the Policy Research Group inside the NPS under Policy Research Chairman Naoto Kan. In January 1996, around two years later, the First Hashimoto Cabinet was formed, who was selected to lead after the resignation of Tomiichi Murayama. He voted for confidence in the new Hashimoto cabinet, allegedly because Hashimoto himself was a member of a group of legislators who resisted removing blood products from the Product Liability Law, which would remove government accountability from them. In the new cabinet, he served as chairman of an administrative reform team, and presented his own plan for civil service reform, including blanket hiring of civil servants and reforms on the practice of Amakudari. He also became the leader of a bipartisan study group composed of young politicians, which was mainly seen as a networking event for politicians who had their eye on joining the new Democratic Party.

He played a role in investigating the HIV tainted blood scandal beginning in 1995, when he was contacted by the plaintiffs defense team and became convinced of the government's responsibility in the issue. In August 1995, a meeting between the Minister of Welfare Shoichi Ide and the victims of the scandal was secretly arranged. The Ministry of Health and Welfare refused to accept responsibility for the crisis, even after a court ordered them to, so the matter was pursued by the House of Representatives Committee on Health and Welfare. He submitted a written inquiry requesting an explanation from the Ministry at the time. In the First Hashimoto Cabinet, he also supported Naoto Kan's efforts to solve the problem, leading to the investigation of the truth and the continued use of non-heat products even after heat products had been developed to treat HIV. He presided over the ministry's apology in February, and in July he took the stand to question Hideo Abe, the former head of the AIDS research team.

=== Joining the Opposition and Democratic Party ===
He participated in the formation of the Democratic Party in 1996, and ran under the party's banner in the 1996 Japanese general election. He attempted to defend his seat in Saitama's 5th district in an election centered around volunteers, running against both Zenjiro Kaneko of the New Frontier Party and Nobuhiko Fukunaga of the LDP. He ultimately lost in a close three-way election only decided by five points to Fukunaga, but was re-elected to the House after being placed on the Northern Kanto proportional representation block. He became Policy Research Chairman of the Democratic Party in 1997, and establish the "2010 Association", a group of young politicians who criticized the clan-like nature of Japanese politics and the Social Democratic Party.

In 1998, the Democratic Party, Good Governance Party, New Fraternity Party, and splinters from the New Frontier Party all merged into one group, and the party was refounded as the Democratic Party of Japan to create a big-tent opposition force. Edano was seated as vice-chairman of the party's Policy Research Group. In the Diet, he submitted several bills, including one to allow for separate surnames for married couples, one to create an Administrative Surveillance Board, and a law further criminalizing possession of child pornography. He was also influential in the passage of the Financial Reconstruction Act. He was named one of the most significant figures in the legislative law boom which began in the 1990s.

In the January 1999 Democratic Party leadership election, in which Shigefumi Matsuzawa challenged then leader Naoto Kan, he was named as a recommender for Matsuzawa, who advocated for the privatization of the three postal services and of special government owned corporations. He then serviced as campaign secretary for Kan when he was challenged again by Yukio Hatoyama inside the party in September, to which he ultimately lost. Under Hatoyama's leadership, he was named as the Acting Chairman of the Policy Research Group, and was named as Deputy Chief Cabinet Secretary under the Next Cabinet system.

He won back his constituency in Saitama's 5th in the 2000 Japanese general election, in what was generally a success for the new Democratic Party. He made two new study group's as well, mainly centered around former members of the New Party Sakigake, of which he was also formerly a member. He also founded the Ryounkai political group in 2002 along with Seiji Maehara and Yoshito Sengoku, which mainly functioned as a conservative pressure organization inside the DP. Edano served as treasurer of the group. In December 2002, when Yukio Hatoyama resigned as party leader and Naoto Kan returned to serve as secretary, Edano was appointed as Chief Cabinet Secretary in the new Next Cabinet. He announced the party's manifesto before the 2003 Japanese general election, in which he held his constituency with an expanded margin.

In 2004, Kan was replaced as leader of the DP by Katsuya Okada. In 2005, despite the party's national struggle (The DP lost 65 seats nationally), Edano was re-elected by five points in his home constituency. In 2005, When Okada stepped down due to his failure in the national elections, he supported his own ally, Seiji Maehara, to succeed him. Maehara won but stepped down soon after due to scandal surrounding an alleged fake email used by him. Edano also gained the position of acting secretary general for the party's strategy and communication.

When, in 2006, Ichirō Ozawa was elected as the party's next representative following the resignation of Maehara, Edano announced he would be stepping away from party leadership roles. In September 2008, Edano briefly debated running for party representative to avoid Ozawa being re-elected without a vote due to the failures of others, such as Naoto Kan to announce a challenge. He gave up due to the fact he could not gain a recognition to run from another Diet member. Edano was re-elected by a 20-point margin in the landslide 2009 Japanese general election, in which he and the Democratic Party were swept into power.

== Government Service ==
=== Hatoyama Cabinet ===
In 2009, when the Hatoyama Cabinet was first inaugurated, there were strong expectations he would become a minister in the government, but this never occurred. Some speculated this was due to a feud he and Ichiro Ozawa still had ongoing. In October, Edano was instead appointed by Yoshito Sengoku, who was serving as Minister of Administrative Reform, to coordinate the Administrative Reform Council, which helped support the Hatoyama's cabinet approval ratings. In this role, he helped sort out funding and commission fees for disaster prevention features in-place in nuclear power facilities, and gave grants out to disaster response features present in the power plants.

In January 2010, it was announced that Sengoku would be nominated to serve concurrently as the Minister for National Strategy, and that Edano would be appointed as the Prime Minister's Advisor to assist Sengoku. However, Edano was never formally appointed, and it was eventually decided that he would be appointed Minister of Administrative Reform instead, relieving Sengoku of the post.

=== Kan Cabinet ===
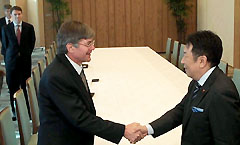
With James Steinberg on 27 January 2011

At the end of May in 2010, the Hatoyama Cabinet resigned, and in the election for successor, Edano supported Naoto Kan along with Seiji Maehara and Katsuya Okada. In June, Edano was appointed secretary-general of the Democratic Party. He led the Democratic Party through the 2010 Japanese House of Councillors election, which saw the DP's minority in the House of Councilors shrink by three seats. Upon the inauguration of the first reshuffled Kan Cabinet in September, he resigned as secretary-general, and was succeeded by Katsuya Okada.

Due to the cabinet reshuffle that occurred in January inside the Kan Cabinet, Edano ended up appointed as Chief Cabinet Secretary (concurrently serving as Minister of State for Okinawa and Northern Territories Affairs at the same time) in the second cabinet. At 46 years old, he was the second-youngest Chief Cabinet Secretary in history. In early march, due to the resignation of Foreign Minister Seiji Maehara, he served in the office on an interim basis until Takeaki Matsumoto was appointed. On June 27, following Renhō's resignation as Minister of Administrative Reform to become the Advisor to the Prime Minister, he was re-appointed to the role for the first time since the Hatoyama Cabinet resigned.

On March 11, 2011, less than two months after taking office as the Chief Cabinet Secretary, the Tōhoku earthquake and tsunami and Fukushima nuclear accident occurred. Edano took on the role of the government's main spokesman on the response to both events, beginning to report on recovery every single day. The strain put on himself as a result, and his energetic response style led to him being compared to Jack Bauer from 24 in overseas media. It was reported that Edano ordered the centralization of information from the disasters, and, as an example, ordered the Ministry of Education, Culture, Sports, Science and Technology to use its observation vehicles to measure radiation within 20-30 kilometers of the nuclear power plant. However, upon being questioned on the results and its health effects, the spokesman stated "We will not evaluate the data. We cannot comment on the instructions of the Chief Cabinet Secretary." In addition, a reporter from the Sankei Shimbun stated that Edano had instructed him to "centralize the information somewhere and not release it without permission," which eventually led to the release of the results through the SPEEDI Network. However, contrary to Edano's instructions to unify the SPEEDI prediction results for radiation analyzed by the Nuclear and Industrial Safety Agency, only two of the forty-five results were sent to the Prime Minister's Office. On the other hand, Ministry of Education, Culture, Sports, Science and Technology sent the results to the United States Armed Forces immediately after the disaster through the Ministry of Foreign Affairs.

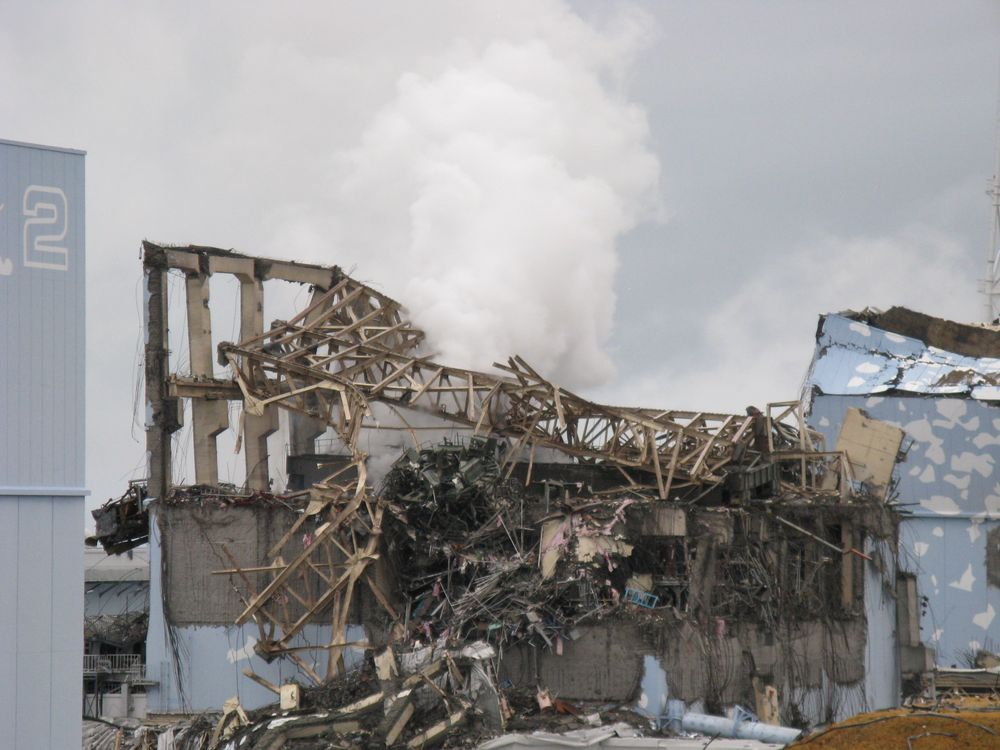
Appearance of Fukushima Nuclear Power Plant Unit 3 after the hydrogen explosion

The United States Nuclear Regulatory Commission released internal documents on the aftermath of the Tokyo Electric Power Company Fukushima disaster. Among them was a record where Edano requested that a nuclear power expert be permanently placed in the Prime Minister's Office as a form of support for Japan, with the Yomiuri Shimbun saying Edano made one more request, stating that the expert in question not be allowed into the Prime Minister's residence. When a hydrogen explosion occurred in the reactor building of Unit 3 of the Fukushima Daiichi Nuclear Power Plant, the Cabinet's Japanese Nuclear Safety Commission proposed that the evacuation radius be extended from 20 to 30 kilometers. In response, Edano and others argued it would be necessary to draw up a large-scale evacuation, stating that "It's fine to expand the evacuation area to 30 kilometers, but it's better to limit it to evacuation indoors." At a press conference held by him at 2 am on March 12, he said on safety considerations for residents before opening vents that "Evacuation within 3 kilometers of the power plant and evacuation indoors within 10 kilometers will allow residents to ensure everyone's safety."

In April 2011, the Ministry of Education, Culture, Sports, Science and Technology set a safety standard for children of 3.8 microsieverts per hour, equivalent to 33 millisieverts per year, but left local governments to decide decontamination methods and didn't take proactive measures. This led the local governments around the power plant to remove topsoil which might have been contaminated with radioactive waste. Regarding the removal of topsoil, Edano recognized the risk of radioactive waste in topsoil, but expressed the view that removal of it is not necessary so-long as the topsoil is handled under the guidelines of the Ministry of Education, Culture, Sports, Science and Technology.

=== Noda Cabinet ===
With the formation of the Noda Cabinet following the resignation of Naoto Kan, he resigned as Chief Cabinet Secretary and Minister in Charge of Administrative Reform. Initially, he stated that he would instead support the cabinet as a private citizen, but was then appointed as the Ministry of Economy, Trade and Industry ten days later by Noda following Yoshio Hachiro's resignation due to alleged inappropriate behavior related to the nuclear meltdown in Fukushima. On October 3, 2011, he was also appointed the Special Minister for Compensation of Nuclear Damage. In November 2011, the Ryounkai group re-organized, with Edano now becoming secretary-general and Maehara beginning to serve as chairman of the organization.

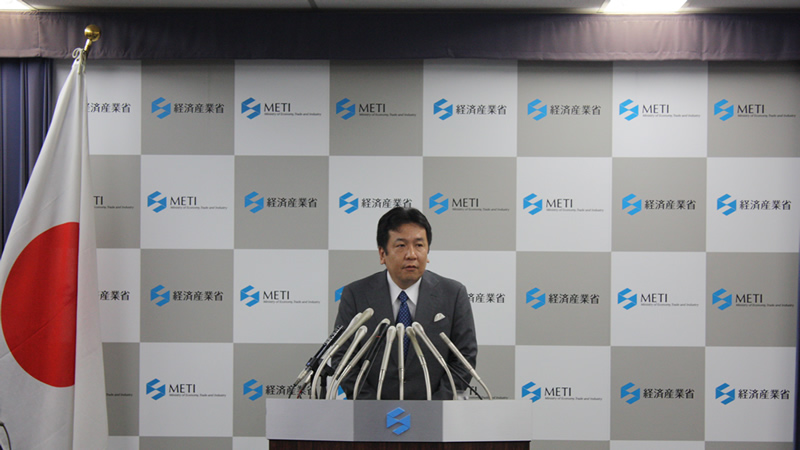
Edano at a press conference following his appointment as Economic Minister

On April 3, 2012, a periodic inspection of the Kansai Electric Power Company's Ōi Nuclear Power Plant 3 and 4, which had been out of operation, confirmed that KEPCO's safety standards had met the government's standards, and issued a declaration of safety. Furthermore, if the power plant wasn't restarted, and the heat wave occurring that year reached levels of 2010, it was thought there would be a power shortage of up to 20% within Kansai Electric's jurisdiction, leading to a rise in electricity price rates, leading to a statement released that ended in "`there is a need to restart [Ōi power] plant." The following day, on the 14th, he met with Governor Issei Nishikawa of Fukui Prefecture, explaining the need for Unit 3 and 4 to be restarted, and asking for his cooperation in restarting operations. On June 1, he stated that "both units will not be able to generate electricity at full capacity until July", indicating that they would not be able to make it in time for July 2 when a 15% power saving request begins within the Kansai Electric Power Company's jurisdiction.

On June 16, the government announced it would restart operations with Governor Nishikawa's consent. On June 18, KEPCO president Makoto Yagi was instructed to ensure the safety of the work in preparation for restarting operations, and requested confirmation of safety measures as a prerequisite for restarting the plants. Later, on July 25, in response to the full operation of Unit 4 restarting, KEPCO President Yagi stated on the also shut-down Takahama Nuclear Power Plant "We would like to make arrangements with the government to restart them as a priority." In response, Edano said "This is a very unpleasant comment. There is no way we can restart operations without thoroughly checking safety", and expressed the idea that an eye should be kept on the evaluation and judgment by the Nuclear Regulation Authority, which was set to be created in September that year. On August 28, regarding the power supply and demand within KEPCO jurisdiction, which achieved its power saving goal in the summer, he said that the situation "would have been very dire" if the Oi Power Plant hadn't been able to restart.

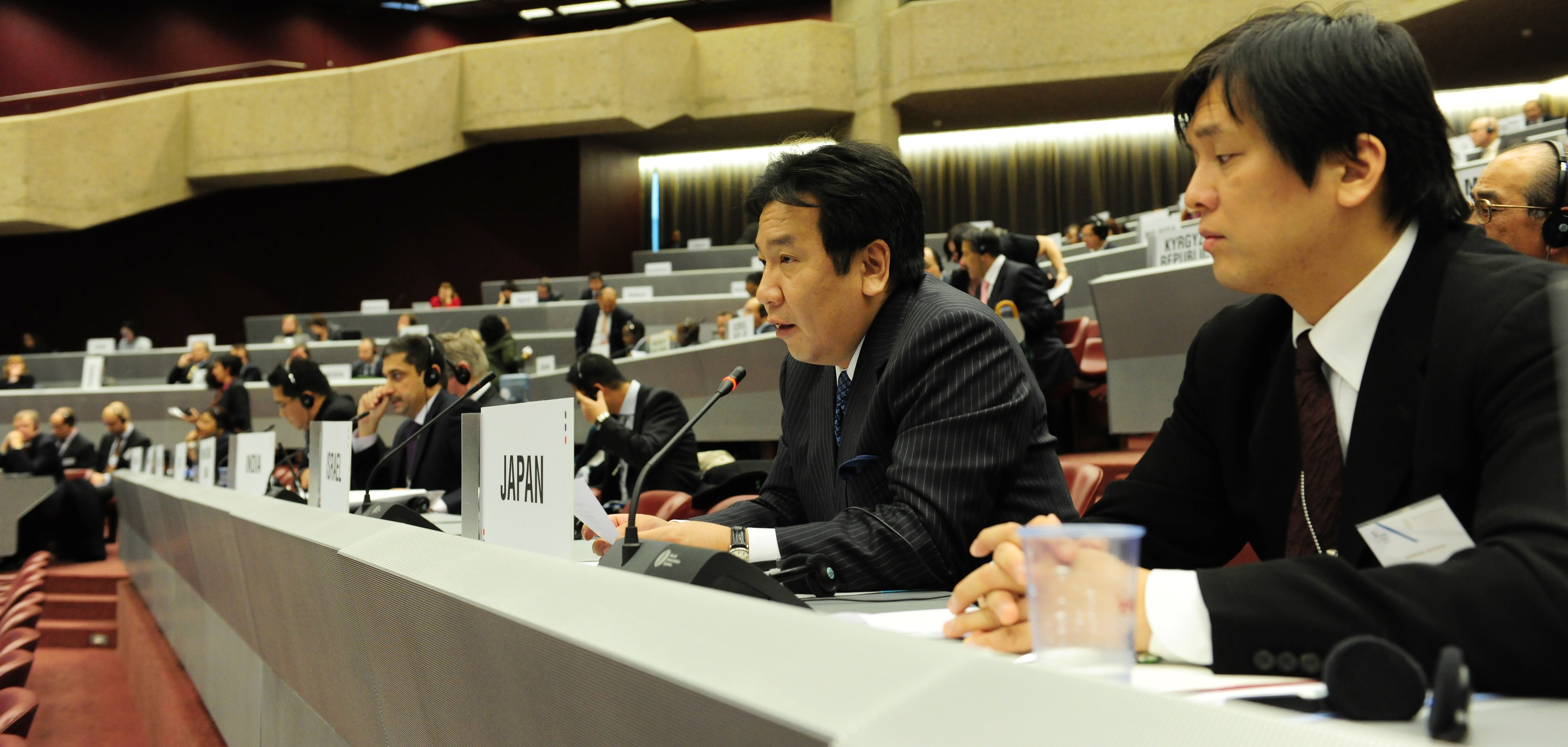
Edano in New York in 2011

On September 15, a meeting was held in Aomori Prefecture with Governor Mimura and the heads of local municipalities which held power plants. Edano spoke about the development of both the Ōma Nuclear Power Plant and Shimane Nuclear Power Plant, whose constructions were both halted after the earthquake in 2011. He effectively conveyed his want to resume the construction of the Shimane Power Plant later that year. In September 2012, Edano approved the resumption of construction in Shimane, and, in October, the Ōma Power Plant was given the go-ahead to resume construction as well.

== Post-cabinet DPJ Years ==
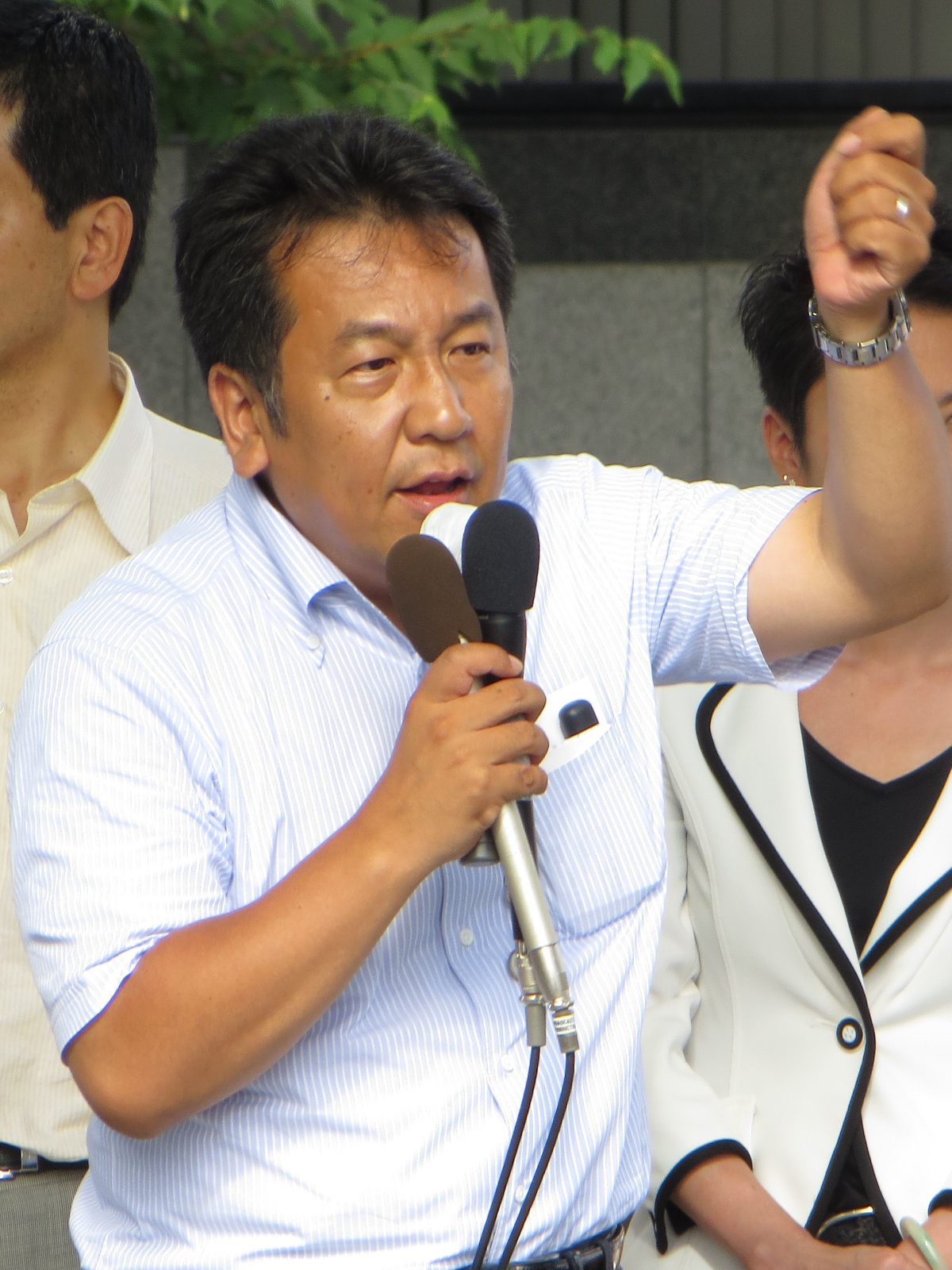
15 July 2013

In the 2012 election, the DPJ suffered a crushing defeat, but Edano managed to hold onto his single-seat constituency by 5 points, becoming the only DPJ member to hold a single seat constituency in Saitama. Edano was named secretary general of the DPJ in September 2014. Edano again held his single seat in the 2014 election, but by a much slimmer two points. After the 2015 representative election, he remained as secretary-general under Katsuya Okada.

In March 2016, the 2016 form of the Democratic Party was created from a merger of the DPJ, Japan Innovation Party, and Vision of Reform. Edano joined the new party and remained as secretary-general following the merger as well. Later that year in October, he also became the Democratic Party's Constitutional Research Chair. Next year, on July 27, 2017, Democratic Party representative Renhō announced her resignation following the lackluster results in the 2017 Tokyo prefectural election, where Democratic Party candidates even underpreformed the JCP. Edano ran for party leadership in the September election, but in a battle with Seiji Maehara and the Ryounkai, lost.

== Constitutional Democratic Party ==
=== Leadership ===
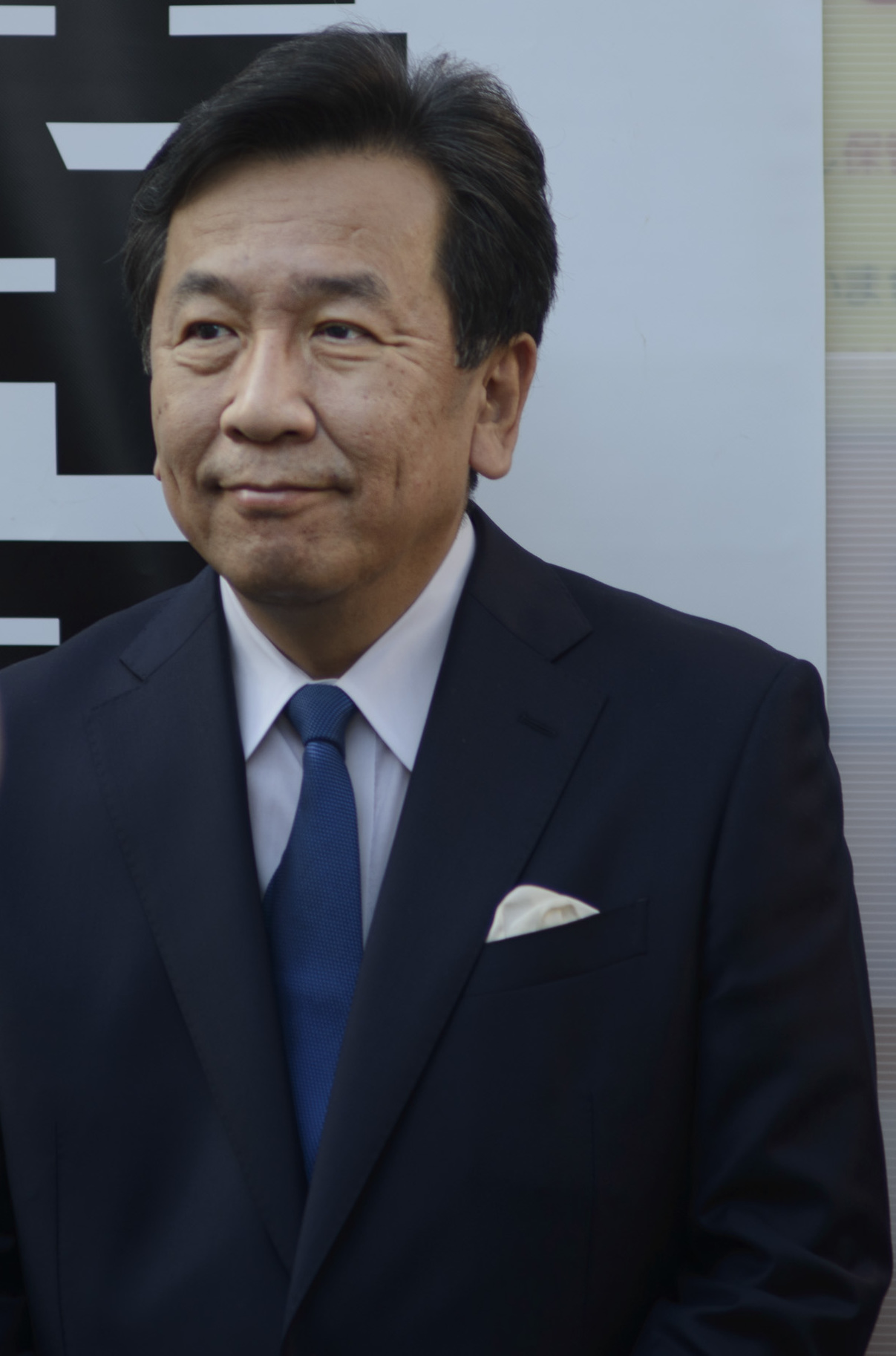
Edano on 18 October 2020

On the afternoon of September 28, 2017, at a general meeting of members of both houses of the Democratic Party in preparation for the 2017 Japanese general election - which Abe had called only three weeks after the DP leadership election - leader Seiji Maehara proposed de facto joining the new party founded by Yuriko Koike, Kibō no Tō. Maehara also made is clear he opposed security legislation. Maehara's proposal was accepted, and Edano briefly thought that the merger would work. However, about two hours later, Koike, who was serving as party representative, said "I don't think anyone who wants to join the [Kibō no Tō] and doesn't support the security legislation will apply in the first place." On September 29, Koike stated at a regular press conference that she would exclude left-wing and liberal members of the Democratic Party, subject to acceptance of the security legislation and amendment of the constitution.

In the early hours of September 30, Kyodo News reported that Edano had begun to consider running as an independent, or possibly forming a new party for now party-less liberals of the former DP. On the same day, an alleged "exclusion list" of 15 former and current DP politicians allegedly created by Koike was circulated. That night, Edano, Akira Nagatsuma, Kiyomi Tsujimoto, Shoichi Kondo, and Tetsuro Fukuyama met in a hotel room in Tokyo to discuss the possibility of forming a new party. On October 1, citizens opposed to the Abe Cabinet held a large-scale demonstration around Shinjuku Station. Edano appeared at Nishi-Shinjuku park and gave a speech in which he said "I will protect and fight for the constitutionalism, freedom of the press, freedom of expression, and information disclosure that the Abe administration has destroyed." Demonstrators told the media "What is needed is to not exclude liberals", and "If Mr. Edano decides to form a new party, we'd like to support him".

On the evening of the same day, Edano asked Maehara to officially recognize politicians who did not wish to join Kibō no Tō as DP members, but Maehara denied the request, meaning that the only way forward for Edano was to either form a new party or run as an independent. Around the same time, other candidates who had been rejected were requesting a new party to form for liberals, and rumors began to spread on the internet of Edano becoming the presumptive leader of a possible new party. The four members who had previously met in the hotel room decided to announce the formation of the party on the next day, the 2nd. Edano was given the choice between three names; the "Democratic Party", "New Democratic Party of Japan", or "Constitutional Democratic Party of Japan". Fukuyama immediately asked a designer he knew to create three logo designs.

Of the three choices, the "Democratic Party" received strong backlash from online campaign staff, citing that it would link the new party back to the negative connotations of the former DPJ government. They also protested "New Democratic Party", citing a jinx in party names with the word new in that they quickly faded away. Eventually, "Constitutional Democratic Party" was picked due to the pre-war parties which shared characters with the name, which seemed like a positive idea to Edano. The next morning, Edano informed Fukuyama of the choice. Also that morning, Edano visited RENGO Headquarters and met with President Rikio Kozu, explaining the situation and his plans to form a new party. After leaving the Democratic Party, he held a press conference that evening and announced that he would form a new party, the Constitutional Democratic Party of Japan, to "play the role of putting a stop to the Abe administration's rampage."

The next day, Nagatsuma submitted a notification of the formation of the new party to the Ministry of Internal Affairs and Communications, which was accepted. In the afternoon that day, Kibō no Tō announced 192 of its own candidates for the House of Representative election, including one contesting Edano's own seat. The JCP showed its cooperation with the CDP, and withdrew its candidate from Saitama's 5th district as a sign of goodwill. In the general election that month, The CDP-SDP-JCP coalition made a shocking finish above Kibō no Tō, overall placing second with five more seats than the party.

He himself won his own district by a widened margin of nearly 20 points over Hideki Makihara once again, a 19% increase in margin for Edano, though Makihara was once again re-elected proportionally. Edano collected 27.57 million yen in the 20 days between announcing the establishment of the party and the election, which was widely considered an outstanding amount compared to that of his past amounts and even Prime Minister (at the time) Shinzo Abe's.

On September 14, 2020, the CDP formed in the 2017 election was dissolved and re-founded a day later as the CDP again. The move happened due to a merger of the majority of the Democratic Party for the People and SDP agreeing to merge with the CDP to form a more unified opposition group, although splinters remained in both parties, including Yuichiro Tamaki and Mizuho Fukushima respectively. He ran against Kenta Izumi in the following leadership election and won with a 40% margin.

=== 2021 election and post-leadership ===
Although the party increased its seats in general to 96 in the 2021 election, the merger meant that it had gone down from its 109 seats following it. Even though it had defeated important politicians, such as former Secretary-General of the LDP Nobuteru Ishihara and Akira Amari, the party suffered losses such as the defeat of Ichirō Ozawa in his single-seat constituency for the first time in fifty years, though he was still re-elected on the proportional block. Edano himself had won his Saitama 5th district by only a 3% margin, and it was not entirely clear he would emerge as the winner until the next day. Although Edano denied resigning as party leader the night of the general election, the party's overall large defeat forced him to announce his intention to resign at the party's executive conference on November 2, and stated that "We must prepare a new system and move forward with next year's House of Councilors elections." He marked the date of November 10, the closing day of the special Diet session, as the day he would resign, and then hold a representative election with the participation of party members.

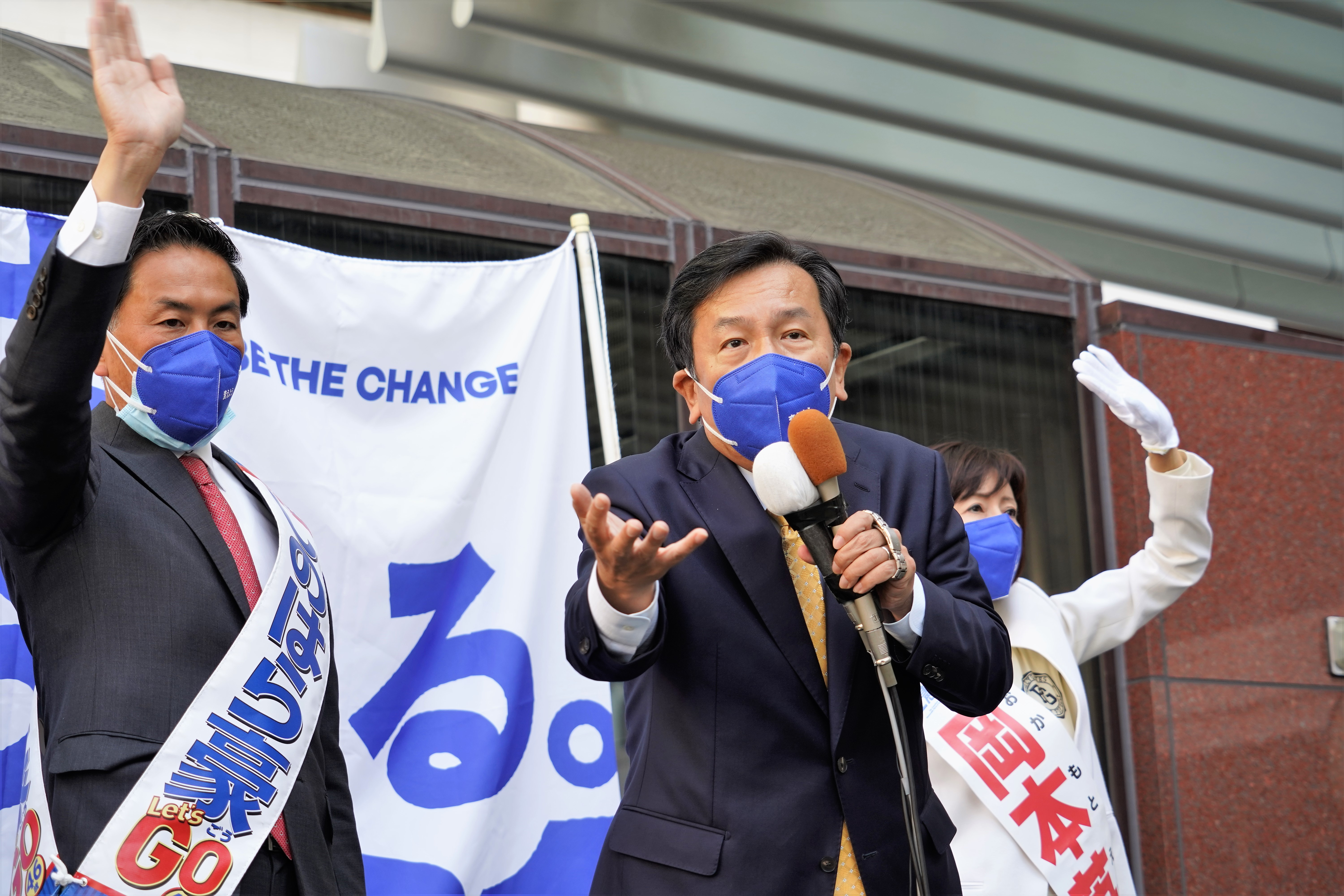
Edano at Yokohama station in 2021

He joined the party group, Sanctuary, on November 5, currently led by Shoichi Kondo. He became an advisor to the group. His resignation as representative was accepted on the 12th, and the schedule for then next representative election was designated.

In 2023, after three years of serving without a party position, it was rumored he wanted to take back leadership of the CDP following Kenta Izumi's failure to recapture momentum in the party. He released a revised version of the "Edano Vision", a manifesto he published when he served as party leader, in August 2023. On July 11, 2024, it was leaked that he would most likely run for leadership in the fall. While Edano denounced the leak, he publicly announced on X (formerly Twitter) that he would run for leadership on 9 August. In the election held on 23 September, Edano lost to former prime minister Yoshihiko Noda, winning 180 points to Noda's 232.

In October 2025, Edano was selected as chairman of the Budget Committee in the House of Representatives, replacing Jun Azumi, who had been appointed CDP secretary general.

Ahead of the February 2026 election, Edano joined the Centrist Reform Alliance, formed through the merger of the CDP and Komeito in the lower house. He was defeated by LDP newcomer Yutaka Ihara. Edano was one of several opposition heavyweights who lost their seats.

== Political views ==
Edano identifies himself with "liberal conservatism." As a liberal, he opposes patriarchy, while as a conservative, he rejects radicalism and socialism, aiming for gradual social improvement. In his book, Edano believes that the labels of liberal and conservative are not conflict with one another. He supports separate surnames for married couples. According to himself, the conservative values he would prefer to enshrine would be the idea of a "mutual support rather than a laissez-faire approach to self-responsibility," further stating his wish to "value freedom, [and] recognize diverse values". He personally considers himself a "mainstream conservative", still reportedly saying to former Prime Minister Tomiichi Murayama that he will "form another liberal government while you're still well".

=== "Constitutional Democracy" ===
Upon founding the CDP in 2017, he advocated what he described as the doctrine of "constitutional democracy", which he ascribed to the idea that "true democracy is established when state power is limited by the constitution". He stated in a speech in Yurakucho that "In recent years, we have found ourselves in a situation where we need to remember the word constitutionalism once again. That is Japan today." He also argued that the main political conflict of the 21st century is not between the left and right, but rather a top-down vs grassroots approach, going on to advocate for the idea, saying that "This is not democracy from above, where people can make arbitrary decisions because they have the numbers, but democracy at the grassroots. Rather than economic policy from above that makes the strong stronger and eventually trickles down to you, it improves the economy by boosting livelihoods."

=== Controversy ===
On March 27, 2010, on the centennial of Japan–Korean annexation, Yukio Edano, then Japanese Minister of State for Government Revitalization, stated that "The invasion and colonization of China and Korea was historically inevitable ... since China and Korea could not modernize themselves."

== Family ==
Edano is married and has twin sons.

House of Representatives (Japan)
Preceded by Hiroshi Sawada; Nobuhiko Fukunaga; Kazuhito Wada	Representative for Saitama 5th district (multi-member); 1993–1996; Served alongside: Kiyoshi Ueda, Kaneshige Wakamatsu, Nobuhiko Fukunaga	Constituency abolished
New constituency	Representative for the Kita-Kantō PR block 1996–2000	Constituency abolished
Preceded by Nobuhiko Fukunaga	Representative for Saitama 5th district 2000–present	Incumbent
Preceded by Eisuke Mori	Chairman of the Commission on the Constitution; 2024–2025	Succeeded by Koichi Takemasa
Preceded by Jun Azumi	Chairman of the Committee on the Budget; 2025–2026	Succeeded by Tetsushi Sakamoto
Party political offices
Preceded by Banri Kaieda	Chairman of the Policy Research Council, Democratic Party; 2002–2004	Succeeded by Yoshito Sengoku
Preceded by Ichirō Ozawa	Secretary General of the Democratic Party of Japan; 2010	Succeeded by Katsuya Okada
New political party	Secretary General of the Democratic Party; 2016	Succeeded by Yoshihiko Noda
New political party	President of the Constitutional Democratic Party of Japan; 2017-2021	Succeeded by Kenta Izumi
Political offices
Preceded by Yoshito Sengoku	Minister of State for Government Revitalisation; 2010	Succeeded by Renhō Murata
Preceded by Yoshito Sengoku	Chief Cabinet Secretary; 2011	Succeeded by Osamu Fujimura
Preceded by Sumio Mabuchi	Minister of State for Okinawa and Northern Territories Affairs; 2011	Succeeded by Tatsuo Kawabata
Preceded by Seiji Maehara	Minister of Foreign Affairs; Acting; 2011	Succeeded by Takeaki Matsumoto
Preceded by Renhō Murata	Minister of State for Government Revitalisation; 2011	Succeeded by Renhō Murata
Preceded by Yoshio Hachiro	Minister of Economy, Trade and Industry; 2011–2012	Succeeded by Toshimitsu Motegi
