= 2016 Kyoto 3rd district by-election =

- 24 April 2016

Kyoto 3rd district
- Turnout: 30.12%
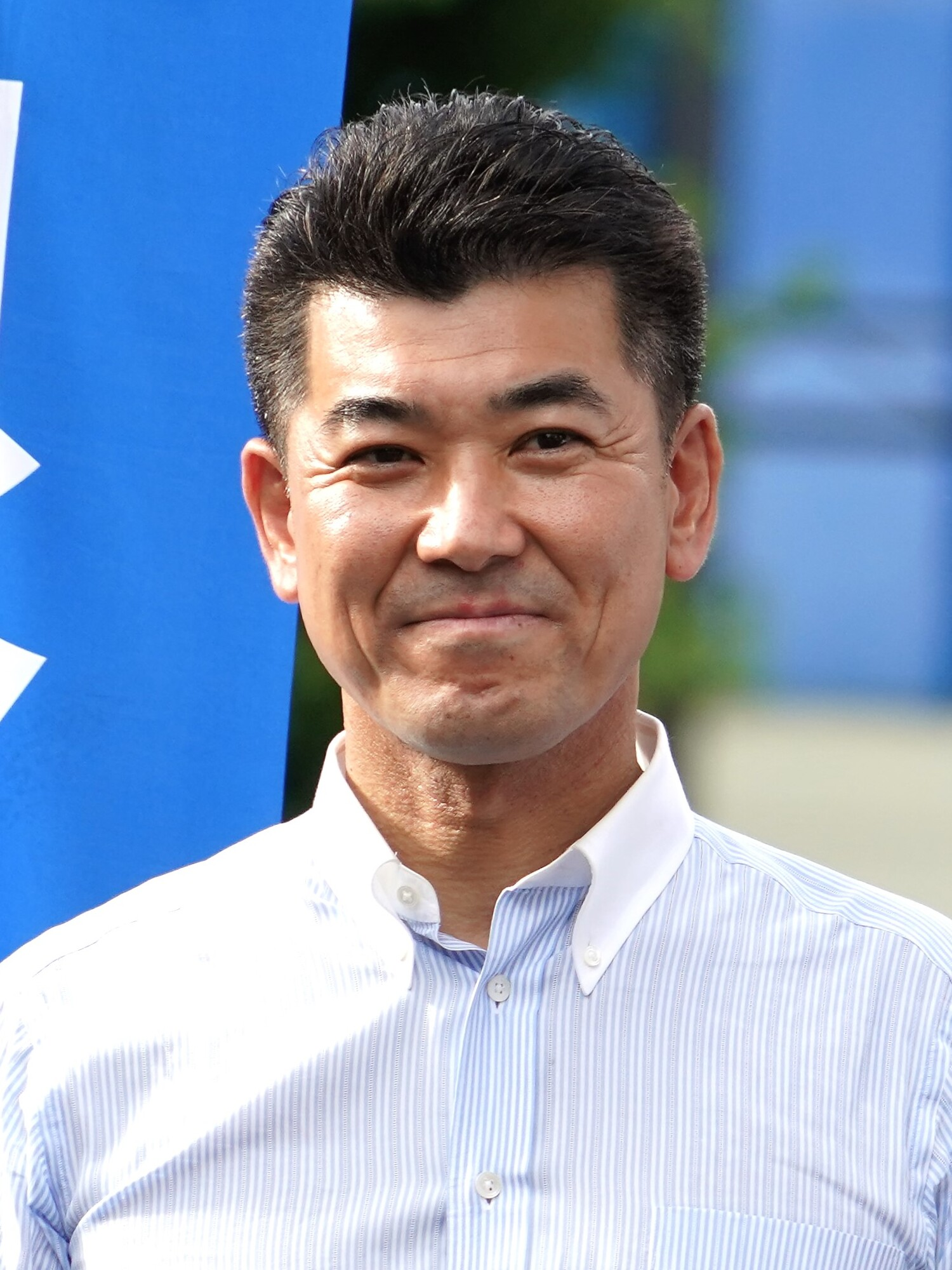
Nominee	Kenta Izumi	Natsue Mori	Yukiko Ono
Party	Democratic	Ishin	Japanese Kokoro
Popular vote	65,051	20,710	6,449
Percentage	65.42%	20.83%	6.49%
Nominee	Masafumi Tabuchi	Mitsuko Ōyagi	Akihiko Kōri
Party	Independent	Happiness Realization	Independent
Popular vote	4,599	2,247	370
Percentage	4.63%	2.26%	0.37%
Representative before election
Kensuke Miyazaki
LDP
Elected Representative
Kenta Izumi
Democratic

A by-election for the Kyoto-3rd seat in the Japanese House of Representatives was held on 24 April 2016, coinciding with the by-election in Hokkaido. The seat became vacant after sitting member Kensuke Miyazaki resigned on 12 February 2016 in the midst of an extramarital affair scandal. Miyazaki, a member of the Liberal Democratic Party, served the district from 2012. He defeated Democratic Party MP Kenta Izumi by slim margins in the 2012 (0.1%) and 2014 (2.7%) elections.

Izumi managed to wrest back his old seat by a landslide, eclipsing his nearest rival by 45 percentage points.

== Outline ==
The district had 344,696 registered voters for the election, an increase of 0.12% since the 2014 general election. As the voting age for national elections was decreased to 18 years in June 2016, this by-election, along with the Hokkaido by-election, were the last national-level election with a minimum voting age of 20 years. The by-elections were the first national-level elections contested by the Democratic Party, Initiatives from Osaka party and Party for Japanese Kokoro under their respective current names. The Communist Party also chose not to field a candidate in the election, despite receiving 27,000 votes (16%) in the 2014 election.

== Dates ==
- 16 March 2016 - Date of election announced
- 12 April 2016 - List of candidates published
- 13–23 April - Early-voting polling booths open
- 24 April 2016 - Polling day

== Candidates ==
The by-election was a six-way race. The LDP decided against fielding a candidate due to the perceived anti-LDP sentiment in light of the Miyazaki scandal. Party bosses were also worried that a heavy defeat in Kyoto might affect LDP's campaign for the House of Councillors election in summer.

Candidates
Party for Japanese Kokoro	Yukiko Ono	Endorsed by the New Renaissance Party
Independent	Masafumi Tabuchi	
Happiness Realization Party	Mitsuko Ōyagi	
Initiatives from Osaka	Natsue Mori	
Democratic	Kenta Izumi	Endorsed by the Social Democratic Party. Representative of the district for three terms (2003-2012). Lost the district in 2012 and 2014 but remained in the House via the Kinki PR block.
Independent	Akihiro Kōri	

== Results ==
House of Representatives: Kyoto 3rd district by-election, 2016
Party	Candidate	Votes	%	±%
Democratic	Kenta Izumi	65,051	65.42	▲32.3^{1}
Ishin	Natsue Mori	20,710	20.83	▲5.8^{2}
Japanese Kokoro	Yukiko Ono	6,449	6.49	N/A
Independent	Masafumi Tabuchi	4,599	4.63	N/A
Happiness Realization	Mitsuko Ōyagi	2,247	2.26	N/A
Independent	Akihiko Kōri	370	0.37	N/A
Rejected ballots		4,224	4.08	
Majority		44,341	44.59	▲42.8
Turnout		103,650	30.12	
Democratic gain from LDP		Swing	N/A	

Note:
^{1} The percentage swing for the Democratic Party candidate is calculated based on the vote share obtained by its predecessor, DPJ.
^{2} The percentage swing for the Initiatives from Osaka candidate is calculated based on the vote share obtained by its predecessor, Japan Innovation Party.
