= Aichi 3rd district =

Legislative district of Japan

- Parliamentary constituency for the Japanese House of Representatives

- Numbered map of Aichi Prefecture single-member districts
- Prefecture: Aichi
- Proportional District: Tokai
- Electorate: 417,344

Current constituency
- Created: 1994
- Seats: One
- Party: LDP
- Representative: Yoshihiko Mizuno
- Municipalities: Shōwa-ku, Midori-ku and Tenpaku-ku of Nagoya City.

Aichi 3rd district (愛知県第3区, Aichi-ken dai-sanku or simply 愛知3区, Aichi sanku) is a single-member constituency of the House of Representatives in the national Diet of Japan located in Aichi Prefecture.

== Areas covered ==
=== since 1994 ===
- Nagoya City
  - Shōwa-ku
  - Midori-ku
  - Tenpaku-ku

== List of representatives ==
Election	Representative	Party	Notes
1996	Yukihiro Yoshida	New Frontier	
1996	Yukihiro Yoshida	Liberal	
1996	Yukihiro Yoshida	New Conservative	
1996	Yukihiro Yoshida	Liberal Democratic	
2000	Shoichi Kondo	Democratic	
2003	Shoichi Kondo	Democratic	
2005	Shoichi Kondo	Democratic	
2009	Shoichi Kondo	Democratic	
2012	Yoshitaka Ikeda	Liberal Democratic	
2014	Shoichi Kondo	Democratic	
2014	Shoichi Kondo	Democratic	
2017	Shoichi Kondo	CDP	
2021	Shoichi Kondo	CDP	
2024	Shoichi Kondo	CDP	
2026	Yoshihiko Mizuno	LDP	

== Election results ==
=== 2026 ===
2026
Party	Candidate	Votes	%	±%
LDP	Yoshihiko Mizuno	98,388	40.8	▲16.2
Centrist Reform	Shoichi Kondo	70,464	29.2	▼17.7
Genzei–Yukoku	Masaki Hiraiwa	37,335	15.5	
Ishin	Masakazu Minagawa	23,561	9.8	▼2.5
JCP	Tamio Shibata	11,262	4.7	
Registered electors		417,852		
Turnout			58.65	▲4.40
LDP gain from Centrist Reform				

=== 2024 ===
2024
Party	Candidate	Votes	%	±%
CDP	Shoichi Kondo	103,624	47.0	▼8.0
LDP	Yoshihiko Mizuno	54,199	24.6	▼20.5
Ishin	Masakazu Minagawa	27,187	12.3	
CPJ	Tooru Oohashi	18,412	8.3	
Sanseitō	Junko Sugimoto	17,234	7.8	
Registered electors		417,042		
Turnout			54.25	▲0.03
CDP hold				

=== 2021 ===
2021
Party	Candidate	Votes	%	±%
CDP	Shoichi Kondo (incumbent)	121,400	54.96	New
Liberal Democratic (endorsed by Komeito)	Yoshitaka Ikeda (PR seat incumbent) (won PR seat)	99,489	45.04	
Majority		21,911	9.92	
Registered electors		417,728		
Turnout			54.22	▲1.91
CDP hold				

=== 2017 ===
2017
Party	Candidate	Votes	%	±%
CDP (endorsed by Greens Japan)	Shoichi Kondo (incumbent)	98,595	46.85	New
Liberal Democratic (endorsed by Komeito)	Yoshitaka Ikeda (PR seat incumbent) (won PR seat)	76,220	36.22	
Kibō no Tō (endorsed by Genzei Nippon)	Sayaka Yogo	35,611	16.92	New
Majority		22,375	10.63	
Registered electors		410,812		
Turnout			52.31	▲0.23
CDP hold				

=== 2014 ===
2014
Party	Candidate	Votes	%	±%
Democratic	Shoichi Kondo (PR seat incumbent)	82,422	41.45	
Liberal Democratic (endorsed by Komeito, NRP)	Yoshitaka Ikeda (incumbent) (won PR seat)	72,353	36.39	
Communist	Hisashi Ishikawa	22,676	11.40	
Genzei Nippon	Narimi Masuda	14,416	7.25	New
Future Generations	Makoto Igeta	6,984	3.51	New
Majority		10,069	5.06	
Registered electors		393,338		
Turnout			52.08	▼4.73
Democratic gain from LDP				

=== 2012 ===
2012
Party	Candidate	Votes	%	±%
Liberal Democratic (endorsed by Komeito)	Yoshitaka Ikeda	77,700	36.67	
Democratic (endorsed by PNP)	Shoichi Kondo (incumbent) (won PR seat)	73,927	34.89	
Tomorrow (endorsed by Daichi)	Azuma Isoura	39,861	18.81	New
Communist	Hisashi Ishikawa	20,421	9.64	
Majority		3,773	1.78	
Registered electors		387,281		
Turnout			56.81	▼9.19
LDP gain from Democratic				

=== 2009 ===
2009
Party	Candidate	Votes	%	±%
Democratic	Shoichi Kondo (incumbent)	153,735	62.18	
Liberal Democratic	Tatsuharu Mawatari (PR seat incumbent)	68,636	27.76	
Communist	Nobuko Motomura	21,611	8.74	
Happiness Realization	Terushige Hattori	3,277	1.33	New
Majority		85,099	34.42	
Registered electors		381,361		
Turnout			66.00	▲3.25
Democratic hold				

=== 2005 ===
2005
Party	Candidate	Votes	%	±%
Democratic	Shoichi Kondo (incumbent)	110,799	48.99	
Liberal Democratic	Tatsuharu Mawatari (won PR seat)	86,426	38.22	
Communist	Hisashi Ishikawa	20,425	9.03	
Independent	Sakae Fujimoto	8,500	3.76	New
Majority		24,373	10.77	
Registered electors		367,839		
Turnout			62.75	▲7.39
Democratic hold				

=== 2003 ===
2003
Party	Candidate	Votes	%	±%
Democratic	Shoichi Kondo (incumbent)	105,017	53.65	
Liberal Democratic	Yukihiro Yoshida (PR seat incumbent)	72,035	36.80	
Communist	Hisashi Ishikawa	18,678	9.54	
Majority		32,982	16.85	
Registered electors		361,875		
Turnout			55.36	
Democratic hold				

=== 2000 ===
2000
Party	Candidate	Votes	%	±%
Democratic	Shoichi Kondo (PR seat incumbent)	95,533	49.52	New
Liberal Democratic	Takeshi Kataoka	62,242	32.26	
Communist	Kazuhiro Nishida	31,875	16.52	
Liberal League	Takeshi Nara	3,282	1.70	New
Majority		33,291	17.26	
Turnout				
Democratic gain from LDP				

- Yoshida moved to PR seats.

=== 1996 ===
1996
Party	Candidate	Votes	%	±%
New Frontier	Yukihiro Yoshida	52,478	32.26	New
Liberal Democratic	Takeshi Kataoka	43,884	26.98	New
Democratic	Shoichi Kondo (won PR seat)	38,351	23.57	New
Communist	Saeko Yanagida	26,225	16.12	New
People's Party	Yoko Nakano	773	0.48	New
Culture Forum	Osamu Ogawa	722	0.44	New
Independent	Masao Atsuji	246	0.15	New
Majority		8,594	5.28	
Turnout				
New Frontier win (new seat)				
