= Kyoto 3rd district =

Legislative district of Japan

Kyoto 3rd District
- 京都府第3区
- Parliamentary constituency for the Japanese House of Representatives
- Prefecture: Kyoto
- Proportional District: Kinki
- Electorate: 353,363 (as of September 2022)

Current constituency
- Created: 1994
- Seats: One
- Party: CRA
- Representative: Kenta Izumi

Kyōto 3rd district (京都府第3区 Kyōto-fu dai-san-ku or simply 京都3区 Kyōto sanku) is a constituency of the House of Representatives in the Diet of Japan. It is located in South central Kyoto and consists of Kyoto city's Fushimi ward, the cities of Mukō and Nagaokakyō and the town of Ōyamazaki. As of 2012, 345,260 eligible voters were registered in the district.

Before the electoral reform of 1994, the area formed part of Kyōto 2nd district where five Representatives had been elected by single non-transferable vote (SNTV).

Kyoto had been a traditional stronghold of the Japanese Communist Party (JCP); but following the electoral reform that replaced the SNTV multi-member districts with FPTP single-member districts, the 3rd district was the only one in Kyōto the JCP could win: Iwao Teramae was one of only two JCP candidates countrywide to win a district seat under the new system in the 1996 general election (the other being Kenjirō Yamahara in Kōchi 1st district). After Teramae's retirement in the 2000 election, Liberal Democrat Shigehiko Okuyama who had narrowly lost to Teramae in ’96 won the district in 2000 when the center-left to left vote was split between a Communist, a Social Democrat and a Democrat. In three following elections, the Social Democratic Party did not nominate a candidate and the Communist vote share dropped below 20 percent and since 2003, Democrat Kenta Izumi won the 3rd district three times. In 2012, Izumi lost the district by 216 votes to 31-year-old Liberal Democratic newcomer Kensuke Miyazaki. In 2016, Miyazaki resigned because of a personal scandal and Izumi regained his seat in the subsequent by-elections.

== Areas covered ==
=== Current district ===
As of 5 January 2023, the areas covered by this district are as follows:

- Fushimi-ku
- Mukō
- Nagaokakyō
- Otokuni District

== List of representatives ==
Representative	Party	Dates	Notes
Iwao Teramae	JCP	1996 – 2000	Retired from politics in 2000
Shigehiko Okuyama	LDP	2000 – 2003	Failed reelection in the Kinki PR block
Kenta Izumi	DPJ	2003 – 2012	Re-elected in the Kinki PR bloc in 2012 and 2014
Kensuke Miyazaki	LDP	2012 – 2016	Resigned mid-term
Kenta Izumi	DP	2016 – 2017	Leader of the CDP Nov. 2021 – Sep. 2024
Kenta Izumi	Kibō no Tō	2017 – 2018	Leader of the CDP Nov. 2021 – Sep. 2024
Kenta Izumi	DPP	2018 – 2020	Leader of the CDP Nov. 2021 – Sep. 2024
Kenta Izumi	CDP	2020 – 2026	Leader of the CDP Nov. 2021 – Sep. 2024
Kenta Izumi	CRA	2026 –	Leader of the CDP Nov. 2021 – Sep. 2024

== Election results ==
2026
Party	Candidate	Votes	%	±%
Centrist Reform	Kenta Izumi	68,533	36.6	▼10.60
LDP	Mamoru Shigemoto (elected in Kinki PR block)	62,406	33.4	▲11.32
Ishin	Motoki Kimura	27,484	14.7	▲0.46
JCP	Nobuhide Nishiyama	15,670	8.4	▼2.46
Sanseitō	Satoru Higuchi	12,951	6.9	▲1.26
Turnout		187,044	54.74	▲3.55
Centrist Reform hold				

2024
Party	Candidate	Votes	%	±%
CDP	Kenta Izumi	82,823	47.20	▼0.99
LDP	Mori Kensei	38,632	22.00	▼11.30
Ishin	Motoki Kimura	24,948	14.20	▼4.31
JCP	Nobuhide Nishiyama	19,002	10.80	
Sanseitō	Mayumi Yoshida	9,916	5.70	New
Turnout			51.19	▼2.33

2021
Party	Candidate	Votes	%	±%
CDP	Kenta Izumi	89,259	48.19	▲9.89
LDP	Yaoi Kimura	61,674	33.30	▼1.06
Ishin	Hiroaki Ino'ue	34,288	18.51	▲8.48
Turnout			53.52	▲6.10

2017
Party	Candidate	Votes	%	±%
Kibō no Tō	Kenta Izumi	63,013	38.30	▼27.12
LDP	Yaoi Kimura (elected in PR block)	56,534	34.36	
JCP	Tooru Kanamori	26,420	16.06	
Ishin	Natsue Mori (elected in PR block)	16,511	10.03	▼10.80
Independent	Shin'ichirō Odagiri	2,059	1.25	
Turnout			47.42	▲17.30

House of Representatives: 2016 Kyoto 3rd district by-election
Party	Candidate	Votes	%	±%
Democratic	Kenta Izumi	65,051	65.42	▲32.3
Ishin	Natsue Mori	20,710	20.83	▲5.8
Japanese Kokoro	Yukiko Ono	6,449	6.49	N/A
Independent	Masafumi Tabuchi	4,599	4.63	N/A
Happiness Realization	Mitsuko Ōyagi	2,247	2.26	N/A
Independent	Akihiko Kōri	370	0.37	N/A
Rejected ballots		4,224	4.08	
Majority		44,341	44.59	▲42.8
Turnout		103,650	30.12	
Democratic gain from LDP		Swing	N/A	

2014 Japanese general election: Kyoto 3rd
Party	Candidate	Votes	%	±%
LDP	Kensuke Miyazaki	59,437	35.84	
Democratic	Kenta Izumi (won seat in Kinki PR)	54,900	33.11	
JCP	Kazuko Ishimura	26,655	16.07	
Ishin	Kōichirō Shimizu	24,840	14.98	
Turnout				

2012
Party	Candidate	Votes	%	±%
LDP	Kensuke Miyazaki	58,951	31.6	
DPJ – PNP	Kenta Izumi (won seat in Kinki PR)	58,735	31.5	
JRP – YP	Seisuke Yamauchi	41,996	22.5	
JCP	Kazuko Ishimura	26,674	14.3	

2009
Party	Candidate	Votes	%	±%
DPJ (PNP support)	Kenta Izumi	121,834		
LDP (Kōmeitō support)	Kōichirō Shimizu	68,043		
JCP	Kazuko Ishimura	30,583		
HRP	Kōichi Kishimoto	2,744		
Turnout		227,525	65.89	

2005
Party	Candidate	Votes	%	±%
DPJ	Kenta Izumi	92,249		
LDP	Kōichirō Shimizu (elected by PR)	91,429		
JCP	Kazuko Ishimura	32,251		
Turnout		219,828	63.9	

2003
Party	Candidate	Votes	%	±%
DPJ	Kenta Izumi	84,052		
LDP	Shigehiko Okuyama	64,726		
JCP	Kazuko Ishimura	30,861		
Turnout		183,824	53.66	

2000
Party	Candidate	Votes	%	±%
LDP	Shigehiko Okuyama	66,576		
DPJ	Kenta Izumi	57,536		
JCP	Takao Honjō	44,816		
SDP	Munenori Ōwan	13,482		
Turnout		188,165	55.43	

1996
Party	Candidate	Votes	%	±%
JCP	Iwao Teramae	58,479		
LDP	Shigehiko Okuyama (elected by PR)	57,241		
NFP	Yasuhide Yamana	52,884		
Turnout		175,202	52.84	
