= Megumi Kaneko =

Japanese politician

- 金子 恵美
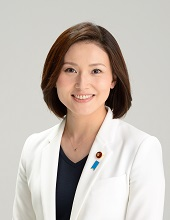

Member of the House of Representatives
- In office 19 December 2012 – 28 September 2017
- Preceded by: Makiko Kikuta
- Succeeded by: Makiko Kikuta
- Constituency: Niigata 4th

Member of the Niigata Prefectural Assembly
- In office 2010–2012
- Constituency: Minami Ward

Member of the Niigata City Assembly
- In office 2007–2010
- Constituency: Minami Ward

Personal details
- Born: 27 February 1978 (age 48) Tsukigata, Niigata, Japan
- Party: Liberal Democratic
- Spouse: Kensuke Miyazaki (m. 2015)
- Education: Waseda University

Megumi Kaneko (Japanese: 金子 恵美, born 27 February 1978) is a Japanese politician. She served as a member of the House of Representatives for the Liberal Democratic Party (LDP) between 2012 and 2017, when she represented the 4th District of Niigata prefecture. She was defeated in the 2017 general election.

== Biography ==
Born in the village of Tsukigata (now part of the city of Niigata), Kaneko was educated at Waseda University. She became a councilor for the Niigata City Council and then a member of the Niigata Prefectural Assembly. She was elected to the House of Representatives in the 2012 general elections, defeating the incumbent representative Makiko Kikuta of the Democratic Party of Japan. She was re-elected in the 2014 elections.

Kaneko is married to Kensuke Miyazaki, who served as an LDP representative for Kyoto until resigning in 2016 after it was revealed that he had an affair whilst Kaneko was pregnant. Her husband's affair was believed to have caused damage to her reputation among her constituents, leading to her defeat in 2017.
