= Masayoshi Namiki =

Japanese politician (born 1949)

- 並木 正芳
- Official portrait, 2005

Member of the House of Representatives
- In office 11 September 2005 – 21 July 2009
- Constituency: Northern Kanto PR
- In office 20 October 1996 – 2 June 2000
- Preceded by: Constituency established
- Succeeded by: Atsushi Kinoshita
- Constituency: Saitama 8th

Member of the Saitama Prefectural Assembly
- In office 1991–1995

Member of the Tokorozawa City Council
- In office 1976–1988

Personal details
- Born: 19 May 1949 (age 77) Tokorozawa, Saitama, Japan
- Party: Independent (1998–2002; 2018–present)
- Other political affiliations: NLC (1976–1986); LDP (1986–1994; 2002–2012); NFP (1994–1998); JRP (2012–2014); JIP (2014–2016); DP (2016–2017); KnT (2017–2018)
- Education: Saitama University

Masayoshi Namiki (並木 正芳, Namiki Masayoshi; born 19 May 1949) is a former Japanese politician of the Liberal Democratic Party (LDP), who served as a member of the House of Representatives in the Diet (national legislature). A native of Tokorozawa, Saitama and graduate of Saitama University, he had served in the assembly of Tokorozawa for three terms since 1979 and in the assembly of Saitama Prefecture for two terms since 1991. He was elected to the House of Representatives for the first time in 1996 as a member of the New Frontier Party. After losing his seat in 2000, he also lost the election in 2003. He was re-elected in 2005 as a member of the LDP.
