= Kensuke Miyazaki =

Japanese politician (born 1981)

- 宮崎 謙介

Member of the House of Representatives
- In office 16 December 2012 – 16 February 2016
- Preceded by: Kenta Izumi
- Succeeded by: Kenta Izumi
- Constituency: Kyoto 3rd

Personal details
- Born: 17 January 1981 (age 45) Tokyo, Japan
- Party: Liberal Democratic
- Spouse(s): Ayuko Kato (m. 2006; div. 2009) Megumi Kaneko (m. 2015)
- Education: Waseda University

Kensuke Miyazaki (宮崎 謙介, Miyazaki Kensuke; born 17 January 1981) is a Japanese politician. He served as a member of the House of Representatives for the Liberal Democratic Party (LDP) between 2012 and 2016.

== Biography ==
Born in Tokyo, Miyazaki was educated at Waseda University. He went on to work at companies in the insurance and human resources industries. He was elected to the House of Representatives in the 2012 general elections, defeating the incumbent Representative Kenta Izumi of the Democratic Party of Japan. He was re-elected in the 2014 elections.

In 2006 he married Ayuko Kato, but the couple divorced in 2009. Kato was later elected as a representative in the National Diet for the LDP in 2014. In 2015 he married another LDP representative, Megumi Kaneko. In January 2016 he became the first representative in Japan to request paternity leave. However, shortly before Kaneko was due to give birth to the couple's child, it was revealed he had had an affair whilst she was pregnant. He subsequently resigned as a member of the National Diet.
