= Hokkaido Sapporo Kaisei High School =

Secondary school in Hokkaido, Japan

Coordinates: 43.0913°N 141.3839°E

Hokkaido Sapporo Kaisei High School Japanese: 北海道札幌開成高等学校
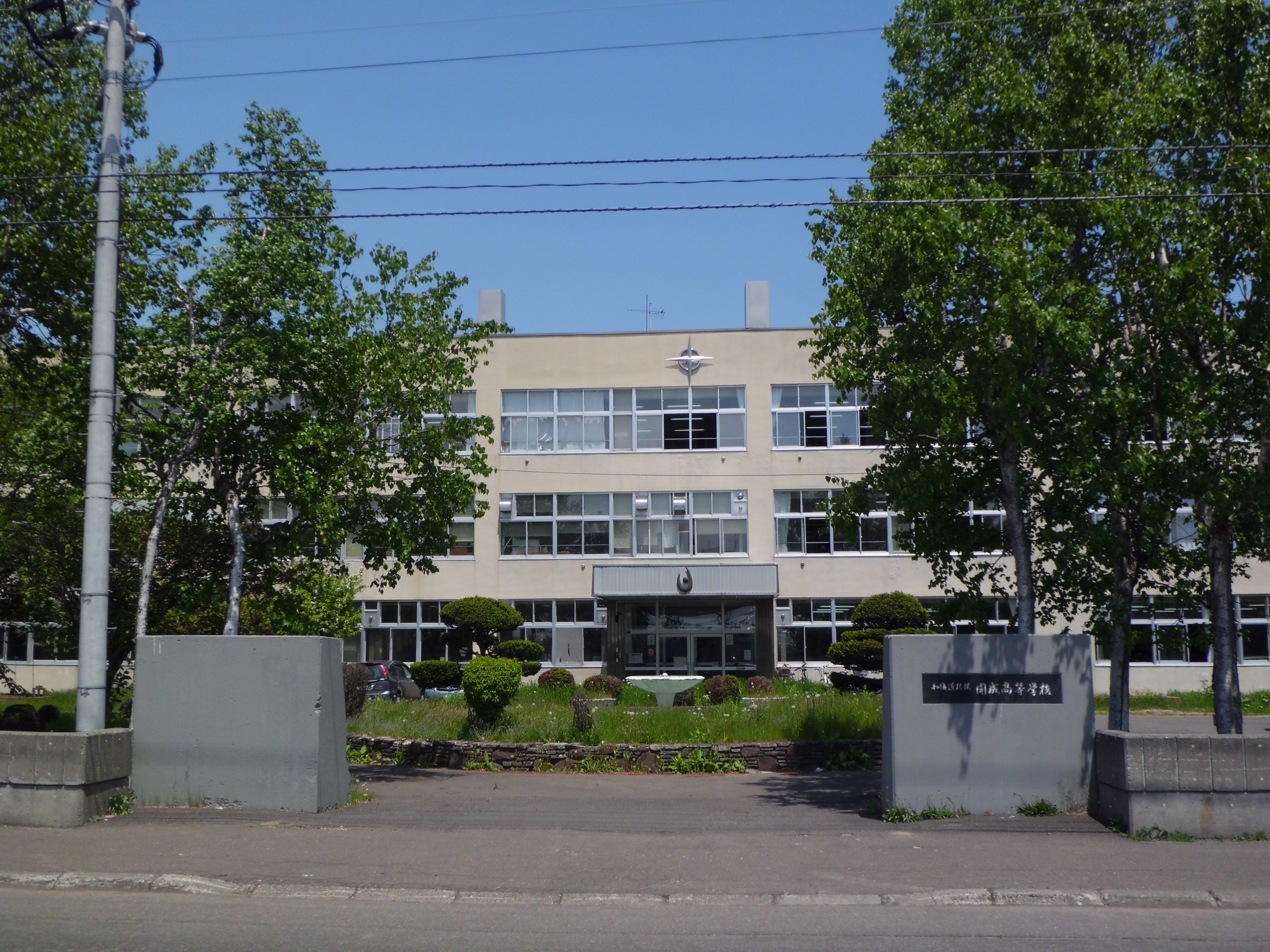

Information
- Established: 1962; 63 years ago

Hokkaido Sapporo Kaisei High School (Japanese: 北海道札幌開成高等学校, romanized: Hokkaidō Sapporo Kaisei Kōtō Gakkō) is a high school in Sapporo, Hokkaido, Japan, founded in 1962.

== Notable alumni ==
- Masaki Yamada (山田 雅樹) Japanese musician

== Address ==
- Address: Higashi 21-1-1, Kita 22, Higashi-ku, Sapporo, Hokkaido, Japan
