= Saitama 5th district =

Legislative district of Japan

Saitama 5th District
- Parliamentary constituency for the Japanese House of Representatives
- Numbered map of Saitama Prefecture single-member districts
- Prefecture: Saitama
- Proportional District: Kita-Kantō
- Electorate: 371,683 (2016)

Current constituency
- Created: 1994
- Seats: One
- Party: LDP
- Representative: Yutaka Ihara
- Created from: Saitama's 5th "medium-sized" district
- Municipalities: Saitama's Nishi, Kita, Minuma, Ōmiya and Chūō wards

Saitama 5th district is a constituency of the House of Representatives in the Diet of Japan (national legislature). It is located in Saitama Prefecture and covers Nishi, Kita, Minuma, Ōmiya and Chūō wards of the city of Saitama.

Yukio Edano of the Constitutional Democratic Party (CDP) has held the district since the 2000 general election. After the Democratic Party dissolved and split in 2017, Edano ascended to leadership of the centre-left CDP, which became the second-largest party in the House of Representatives in the 2017 general election.

Edano along with other DPJ candidates won all but one district in Saitama in the 2009 DPJ landslide, wiping out the Liberal Democratic Party (LDP) from the prefecture. Their fortunes were reversed in the 2012 general election. Edano was the only member of the Democratic Party of Japan (DPJ) in Saitama prefecture to retain his seat, as the party lost two-thirds of its seats nationwide amid a poor economy and relative geopolitical decline. While losing the race, Edano's resurgent LDP opponent Hideki Makihara managed to gain a proportional block seat. The margin closed down further in the 2014 election and Makihara was only within 3,300 votes from unseating Edano. Makihara was unable to overcome the margin in the 2017 election following the nationwide surge of the Edano-led CDP. Edano was re-elected with a comfortable 20.28% majority.

== List of representatives ==
| Representative | Party | Dates | Notes |
|---|---|---|---|
| Nobuhiko Fukunaga | LDP | 1996 – 2000 | |
| Yukio Edano | DPJ | 2000 – 2016 | |
| Yukio Edano | DP | 2016 – 2017 | |
| Yukio Edano | CDP | 2017 – 2026 | |
| Yutaka Ihara | LDP | 2026 – | |

== Election results ==
=== 2026 ===
2026
| Party | Candidate | Votes | % | ±% |
|---|---|---|---|---|
| LDP | Yutaka Ihara | 104,836 | 47.4 | ▲10.3 |
| Centrist Reform | Yukio Edano | 90,795 | 41.0 | ▼10.0 |
| Sanseitō | Keisuke Iizuka | 25,775 | 11.6 | new |
| Majority | | 14,041 | 6.22 | ▼7.74 |
| Registered electors | | 398,784 | | |
| Turnout | | | 56.58 | ▲1.82 |
| LDP gain from Centrist Reform | | | | |

=== 2024 ===
2024
| Party | Candidate | Votes | % | ±% |
|---|---|---|---|---|
| CDP | Yukio Edano | 107,778 | 50.98 | ▼0.40 |
| LDP (Komeito) | Hideki Makihara | 78,250 | 37.02 | ▼11.60 |
| Reiwa | Chihiro Tsujimura | 15,295 | 7.23 | new |
| JCP | Yuko Yamamoto | 10,098 | 4.78 | new |
| Majority | | 29,528 | 13.96 | ▲12.58 |
| Registered electors | | 395,908 | | |
| Turnout | | | 54.76 | |
| CDP hold | | | | |

=== 2021 ===
2021
| Party | Candidate | Votes | % | ±% |
|---|---|---|---|---|
| CDP | Yukio Edano | 113,615 | 51.38% | ▼6.02 |
| LDP | Hideki Makihara (elected by PR, endorsed by Kōmeitō) | 107,532 | 48.62% | ▲11.50 |
| Majority | | 6,083 | 1.38 | ▼18.90 |
| CDP hold | | Swing | ▼6.02 | |

=== 2017 ===
2017
| Party | Candidate | Votes | % | ±% |
|---|---|---|---|---|
| CDP | Yukio Edano | 119,091 | 57.40 | ▲11.31 |
| LDP | Hideki Makihara (elected by PR, endorsed by Kōmeitō) | 77,023 | 37.12 | ▼7.24 |
| Kibō no Tō | Hidefumi Takagi (endorsed by Ishin) | 11,379 | 5.48 | N/A |
| Majority | | 42,068 | 20.28 | |
| Turnout | | | 54.76 | ▼0.78 |
| CDP hold | | Swing | ▲9.28 | |

2014
| Party | Candidate | Votes | % | ±% |
|---|---|---|---|---|
| Democratic | Yukio Edano | 90,030 | 46.09 | ▲0.72 |
| LDP | Hideki Makihara (elected by PR, endorsed by Kōmeitō) | 86,636 | 44.36 | ▲3.57 |
| JCP | Yūko Yamamoto | 18,654 | 9.55 | ▲3.19 |
| Majority | | 3,394 | 1.73 | |
| Turnout | | | 55.54 | |
| Democratic hold | | Swing | ▼1.43 | |

2012
| Party | Candidate | Votes | % | ±% |
|---|---|---|---|---|
| Democratic | Yukio Edano (endorsed by PNP) | 93,585 | 45.37 | ▼13.68 |
| LDP | Hideki Makihara (elected by PR, endorsed by Kōmeitō) | 84,120 | 40.79 | ▲2.31 |
| Tomorrow | Toshihisa Fujishima (endorsed by NPD) | 15,434 | 7.48 | N/A |
| JCP | Yutaka Ōishi | 13,109 | 6.36 | N/A |
| Majority | | 9,465 | 4.58 | |
| Turnout | | | | |
| Democratic hold | | Swing | ▼8.00 | |

2009
| Party | Candidate | Votes | % | ±% |
|---|---|---|---|---|
| Democratic | Yukio Edano | 130,920 | 59.15 | ▲10.47 |
| LDP | Hideki Makihara | 85,139 | 38.48 | ▼4.75 |
| Happiness Realization | Masako Sasaki | 5,274 | 2.38 | N/A |
| Majority | | 45,781 | 20.67 | |
| Democratic hold | | Swing | ▲7.61 | |

2005
| Party | Candidate | Votes | % | ±% |
|---|---|---|---|---|
| Democratic | Yukio Edano | 103,014 | 48.68 | |
| LDP | Hideki Makihara (elected by PR) | 91,472 | 43.22 | |
| JCP | Yutaka Matsushita | 17,140 | 8.10 | |

2003
| Party | Candidate | Votes | % | ±% |
|---|---|---|---|---|
| Democratic | Yukio Edano | 95,626 | 56.4 | |
| LDP | Hideaki Takahashi | 60,410 | 35.6 | |
| JCP | Yutaka Matsushita | 13,493 | 8.0 | |

2000
| Party | Candidate | Votes | % | ±% |
|---|---|---|---|---|
| Democratic | Yukio Edano | 106,711 | 45.5 | |
| LDP | Nobuhiko Fukunaga | 86,179 | 36.8 | |
| JCP | Yukio Fujiwara | 34,192 | 14.6 | |
| Liberal League | Chiwa Aida | 7,369 | 3.1 | |

1996
| Party | Candidate | Votes | % | ±% |
|---|---|---|---|---|
| LDP | Nobuhiko Fukunaga | 63,120 | 30.9 | |
| New Frontier | Zenjirō Kaneko | 54,032 | 26.4 | |
| Democratic | Yukio Edano (elected by PR) | 51,425 | 25.2 | |
| JCP | Yukio Fujiwara | 33,643 | 16.5 | |
| Liberal League | Masayuki Abe | 2,127 | 1.0 | |
