= Sapporo Kita High School =

High school in Hokkaido, Japan

Coordinates: 43°5′27″N 141°20′0.2″E

Sapporo Kita High School Japanese: 北海道札幌北高等学校
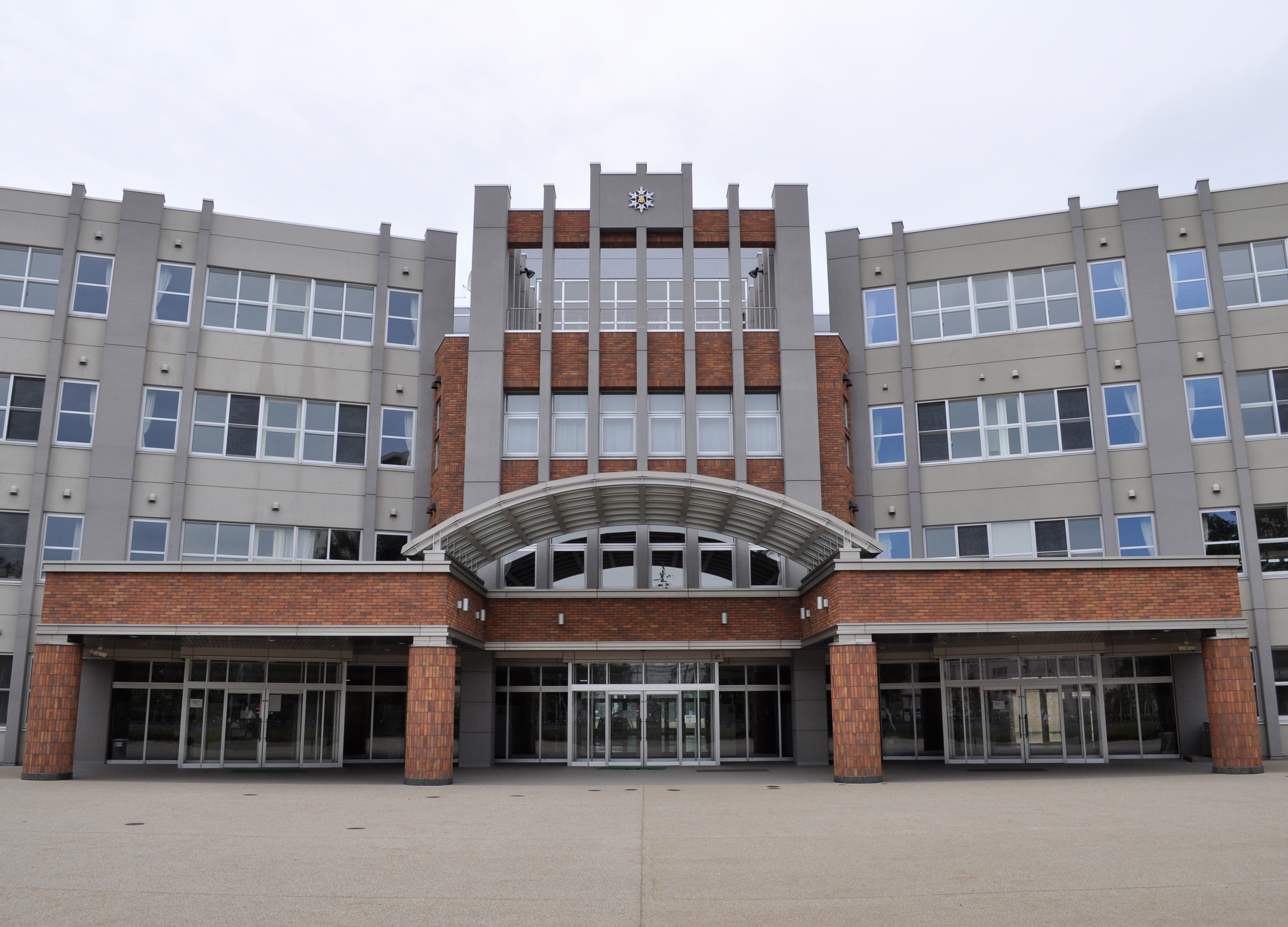

Information
- Established: 1902; 123 years ago

Hokkaido Sapporo Kita High School (Japanese: 北海道札幌北高等学校, Hokkaidō Sapporo Kita Kōtō Gakkō) is a high school in Kita-ku, Sapporo, Hokkaidō, Japan, founded in 1902. It is one of the top high schools in Hokkaido.

The school is operated by the Hokkaido Prefectural Board of Education.
