= Koichiro Shimizu =

Japanese doctor and politician

- 清水 鴻一郎

Member of the House of Representatives
- In office 26 December 2013 – 21 November 2014
- Preceded by: Hideo Higashikokubaru
- Succeeded by: Multi-member district
- Constituency: Kinki PR
- In office 11 September 2005 – 21 July 2009
- Constituency: Kinki PR

Member of the Kyoto Prefectural Assembly
- In office 30 April 1999 – 30 August 2005
- Constituency: Fushimi Ward, Kyoto City
- In office August 1993 – 8 October 1996
- Constituency: Fushimi Ward, Kyoto City

Personal details
- Born: 5 March 1946 (age 80) Fushimi, Kyoto, Japan
- Party: Liberal Democratic (1995–2010; 2020–present)
- Other political affiliations: JNP (1993–1995); Your Party (2010–2012); JRP (2012–2014); JIP (2014–2016); Independent (2016–2020)
- Education: Osaka Medical and Pharmaceutical University

Koichiro Shimizu (清水 鴻一郎, Shimizu Kōichirō; born 5 March 1946) is a Japanese doctor and politician of the Liberal Democratic Party, a member of the House of Representatives in the Diet (national legislature). A native of Kyoto, he attended Osaka Medical College and received a Ph.D. in medicine. He also studied at the University of Chicago for two years. After working as a doctor, he was elected to the assembly of Kyoto Prefecture for the first time in 1993 where he served for four terms. He was elected to the House of Representatives for the first time in 2005.
