= Shoichi Kondo =

Japanese politician

Shōichi Kondō
- 近藤 昭一
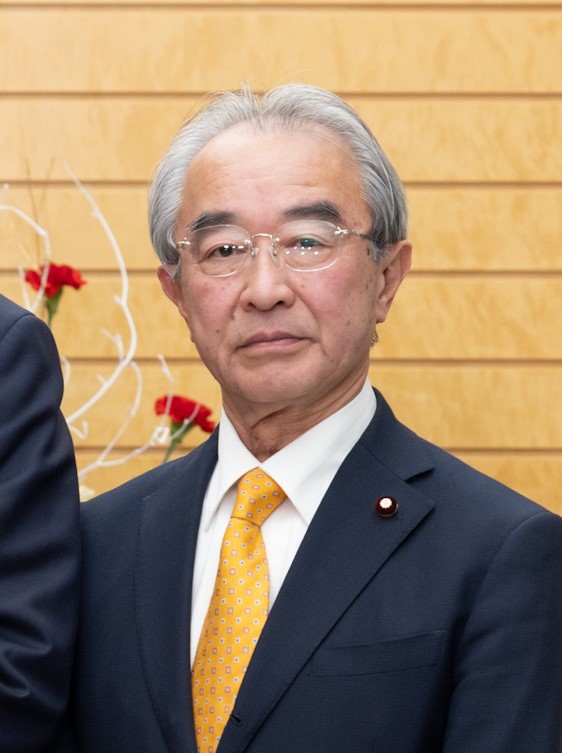
- Kondo in 2024

Executive Deputy President of the Constitutional Democratic Party
- Incumbent
- Assumed office 11 September 2025
- Leader: Yoshihiko Noda
- Preceded by: Akira Nagatsuma

Member of the House of Representatives
- In office 21 October 1996 – 23 January 2026
- Preceded by: Constituency established
- Succeeded by: Yoshihiko Mizuno
- Constituency: Tōkai PR (1996–2000); Aichi 3rd (2000–2012); Tōkai PR (2012–2014); Aichi 3rd (2014–2026)

Personal details
- Born: 26 May 1958 (age 68) Nagoya, Aichi, Japan
- Party: CRA (since 2026)
- Other political affiliations: NPS (1994–1996); DP 1996 (1996–1998); DPJ (1998–2016); DP 2016 (2016–2017); CDP (2017–2026)
- Education: Sophia University

Shoichi Kondo (近藤 昭一, Kondō Shōichi; born 26 May 1958) is a Japanese politician of the Constitutional Democratic Party of Japan, and a member of the House of Representatives in the Diet (national legislature).

== Early life ==
Kondo started working for the Chunichi Shimbun, a major left-leaning, progressive and social-democratic general newspaper, in 1984 and left the company in 1993.

== Political career ==
Kondo is a former member of the Democratic Party (DP), the Democratic Party of Japan (DPJ), and New Party Sakigake. After he joined the DPJ in 1996, he was elected to the House of Representatives.

Kondo is part of the CDP's shadow cabinet 'Next Cabinet' as the shadow Minister of the Environment.
