= 2019 Nara gubernatorial election =

19th unified gubernatorial election

- 7 April 2019
- Turnout: 48.49% ▲3.87%
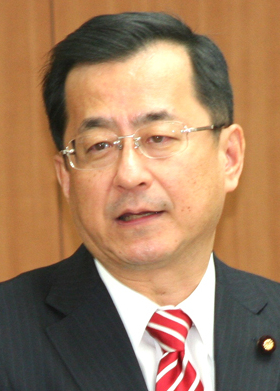
Nominee	Shōgo Arai	Kiyoshige Maekawa	Minoru Kawashima
Party	Independent	Independent	Independent
Popular vote	256,451	174,277	108,701
Percentage	47.54%	32.31%	20.15%
Governor before election
Shōgo Arai
Independent
Elected Governor
Shōgo Arai
Independent

A gubernatorial election was held on 7 April 2019 as part of the 19th unified elections to elect the next governor of Nara Prefecture, Japan.

== Candidates ==
- Shōgo Arai, backed by the local LDP, Komeito, DPFP.
- Kiyoshige Maekawa, ex member of DPJ and Kibō no Tō.
- Minoru Kawashima.

== Results ==
Nara gubernatorial 2019
Party	Candidate	Votes	%	±%
Independent	Shōgo Arai	256,451	47.54	−2.7
Independent	Kiyoshige Maekawa	174,277	32.31	n/a
Independent	Minoru Kawashima	108,701	20.15	n/a
Turnout		551,834	48.49	+ 3.87
Registered electors		1,137,965		
