= Shigeki Kobayashi =

Japanese politician

- 小林 茂樹
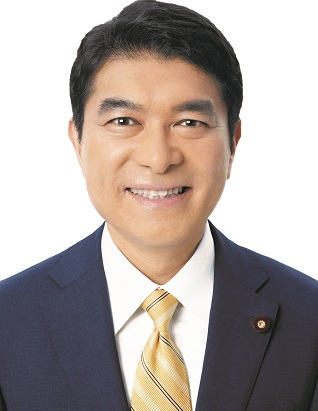
- Official portrait, 2019

Member of the House of Representatives
- Incumbent
- Assumed office 23 October 2017
- Preceded by: Sumio Mabuchi
- Constituency: Nara 1st (2017–2021); Kinki PR (2021–2026); Nara 1st (2026–present)
- In office 17 December 2012 – 21 November 2014
- Constituency: Kinki PR

Member of the Nara Prefectural Assembly
- In office 30 April 2007 – November 2012
- Constituency: Yamabe District & Nara City

Personal details
- Born: 9 October 1964 (age 61) Nara, Nara Prefecture, Japan
- Party: Liberal Democratic
- Education: Keio University
- Website: Shigeki Kobayashi website

Shigeki Kobayashi (小林 茂樹, Kobayashi Shigeki; born 9 October 1964) is a Japanese politician of the Liberal Democratic Party, who serves as a member of the House of Representatives.

== Political career ==
In 2007, Kobayashi ran for the Nara Prefectural Assembly and was elected for the first time. He was re-elected in the 2011 election.

In November 2012, Kobayashi resigned as a member of the Nara Prefectural Assembly and announced his candidacy for the general election. He ran for Nara 1st district, but lost to DPJ Incumbent Sumio Mabuchi, former Minister of Land, Infrastructure, Transport and Tourism. However, Kobayashi won a seat in the Kinki PR block.

In the 2014 general election, Kobayashi lost to DPJ’s Mabuchi again. Unlike the last election, Kobayashi could not win a seat in the PR block.

In the 2017 general election, Kobayashi won over Kibō’s Mabuchi and gain Nara 1st’s seat from Mabuchi. It is the first time since the 2000 general election that LDP won a seat in Nara 1st.

In the 2021 LDP presidential election, Kobayashi endorsed Sanae Takaichi as a recommender.

In the 2021 general election, Kobayashi was defeated by CDP’s Mabuchi and Mabuchi regained the Nara 1st’s seat. Kobayashi won a seat in the PR block.

In the 2024 LDP presidential election, Kobayashi endorsed Takaichi as a recommender again.

In the 2024 general election, Kobayashi lost to Mabuchi again, but won a seat in the PR block.

In the 2025 LDP presidential election, Kobayashi endorsed Takaichi as a recommender again.

In 2025, Kobayashi was appointed to the State Minister of Education, Culture, Sports, Science and Technology in the First Takaichi cabinet.

In the 2026 general election, Kobayashi defeated CRA's Mabuchi to regain Nara 1st’s seat. After the election, he was appointed to the State Minister of Education, Culture, Sports, Science and Technology in the Second Takaichi cabinet.
