= Sanae Takaichi =

Prime Minister of Japan since 2025

Her Excellency Sanae Takaichi
- 高市 早苗
- Official portrait, 2025

Prime Minister of Japan
- Incumbent
- Assumed office 21 October 2025
- Monarch: Naruhito
- Preceded by: Shigeru Ishiba

President of the Liberal Democratic Party
- Incumbent
- Assumed office 4 October 2025
- Vice President: Tarō Asō
- Secretary-General: Shun'ichi Suzuki
- Preceded by: Shigeru Ishiba
Ministerial offices
Minister of State for Economic Security
In office 10 August 2022 – 1 October 2024
| Prime Minister | Fumio Kishida |
| Preceded by | Takayuki Kobayashi |
| Succeeded by | Minoru Kiuchi |
Minister for Internal Affairs and Communications
In office 11 September 2019 – 16 September 2020
| Prime Minister | Shinzo Abe |
| Preceded by | Masatoshi Ishida |
| Succeeded by | Ryota Takeda |
In office 3 September 2014 – 3 August 2017
| Prime Minister | Shinzo Abe |
| Preceded by | Yoshitaka Shindō |
| Succeeded by | Seiko Noda |
Minister of State for Okinawa and Northern Territories Affairs
In office 26 September 2006 – 26 September 2007
| Prime Minister | Shinzo Abe |
| Preceded by | Yuriko Koike |
| Succeeded by | Fumio Kishida |
Minister of State for Science and Technology Policy
In office 26 September 2006 – 26 September 2007
| Prime Minister | Shinzo Abe |
| Preceded by | Iwao Matsuda |
| Succeeded by | Fumio Kishida |
Minister of State for Gender Equality and Social Affairs
In office 26 September 2006 – 26 September 2007
| Prime Minister | Shinzo Abe |
| Preceded by | Kuniko Inoguchi |
| Succeeded by | Yōko Kamikawa |
Minister of State for Food Safety
In office 26 September 2006 – 26 September 2007
| Prime Minister | Shinzo Abe |
| Preceded by | Iwao Matsuda |
| Succeeded by | Shinya Izumi |
Minister of State for Innovation
In office 26 September 2006 – 26 September 2007
| Prime Minister | Shinzo Abe |
| Preceded by | Position established |
| Succeeded by | Position abolished |

Member of the House of Representatives
- Incumbent
- Assumed office 11 September 2005
- Preceded by: Tetsuji Nakamura
- Constituency: Nara 2nd (2005–2009); Kinki PR (2009–2012); Nara 2nd (2012–present)
- Majority: 164,787 (74.01%)
- In office 19 July 1993 – 8 November 2003
- Constituency: Nara at-large (1993–1996); Nara 1st (1996–2000); Kinki PR (2000–2003)

Personal details
- Born: 7 March 1961 (age 65) Tenri, Nara, Japan
- Party: Liberal Democratic (after 1996)
- Other political affiliations: Independent (1993–1994); Liberals (1994); NFP (1994–1996)
- Spouses: Taku Yamamoto (m. 2004; div. 2017); (m. 2021)
- Children: 3
- Education: Kobe University (BBA)
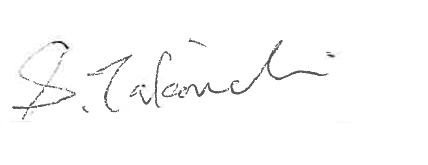
- Signature (Latinized)

- Website: sanae.gr.jp

Japanese name
- Kanji: 高市 早苗
- Kana: たかいち さなえ
- Revised Hepburn: Takaichi Sanae
- Takaichi's voice Takaichi delivers remarks after being appointed Prime Minister of Japan. Recorded 21 October 2025

Sanae Takaichi (高市 早苗, Takaichi Sanae; born 7 March 1961) is a Japanese politician who has served as Prime Minister of Japan and President of the Liberal Democratic Party (LDP) since October 2025. She is the first woman to hold either of these positions in Japanese history. A member of the House of Representatives from 1993 to 2003 and since 2005, she also held ministerial posts during the premierships of Shinzo Abe and Fumio Kishida.

Born and raised in Tenri, Nara Prefecture, Takaichi graduated from Kobe University and worked as an author, legislative aide, and broadcaster before beginning her political career. Elected as an independent to the House of Representatives in the 1993 general election, she joined the Liberal Democratic Party (LDP) in 1996. A protégé of Prime Minister Abe, she held various positions during Abe's premiership, most notably as Minister for Internal Affairs and Communications. She was a candidate in the 2021 LDP leadership election, but was eliminated before the runoff, achieving third place. From 2022 to 2024, during Kishida's premiership, she served as the Minister of State for Economic Security.

Takaichi made her second run for the party leadership in the 2024 leadership election, where she came in first in the first round but narrowly lost in a runoff to her predecessor Shigeru Ishiba. She ran for the third time in the 2025 leadership election and placed first in both rounds of voting, defeating Shinjirō Koizumi, and becoming the party's first female president. Following the end of the LDP–Komeito coalition, Takaichi secured a coalition agreement with the Japan Innovation Party, and was elected prime minister by the National Diet on 21 October. Early in her premiership, Takaichi faced a diplomatic crisis with China after a statement she made regarding Japan's involvement regarding a potential Chinese attack on Taiwan and subsequent threatening remarks by a Chinese diplomat. In 2026, she called a snap general election, which resulted in a historic landslide victory for the LDP, securing a two-thirds supermajority and the largest number of seats ever won in postwar Japanese electoral history. During her tenure, Takaichi has overseen amendments to the Imperial Household Law which kept the prohibition on female successors to the emperor, passing of a law that prohibits the desecration of the Japanese flag, lifting the Japanese arms-export ban, as well as the creation of the National Intelligence Bureau and National Disaster Management Agency.

Takaichi's views have been variously described as conservative or ultraconservative. Her domestic policy includes support for proactive government spending and continuing Abenomics. She has taken conservative positions on social issues, such as opposing same-sex marriage, recognition of separate surnames for spouses, and female succession to the Japanese throne. Takaichi supports revising Article 9 of the Constitution of Japan – which renounces the use of military force – has a pro-Taiwanese foreign policy, and supports strengthening the US–Japan alliance. A member of the far-right Nippon Kaigi, she has been described as holding revisionist views of Japan's conduct during the Second World War, and criticised the Murayama and Kono Statements which apologised for Japanese war crimes. She made regular visits to the controversial Yasukuni Shrine prior to her premiership. Since her election as prime minister, Takaichi has been described as one of the most powerful women in the world and she states her goal is to become Japan's "Iron Lady".

== Early life ==
Sanae Takaichi was born on 7 March 1961 in Yamatokōriyama, Nara Prefecture, to a dual-income middle-class family. Her father, Daikyū Takaichi, worked for an automotive firm affiliated with Toyota. Her mother, Kazuko Takaichi (1932–2018), served in the Nara Prefectural Police. Takaichi graduated from Nara Prefectural Unebi High School. Despite qualifying to matriculate at Keio and Waseda universities in Tokyo, she did not attend as her parents refused to cover tuition fees if she left home or chose a private university, because she was a woman.

Instead, Takaichi commuted six hours from her family home to attend Kobe University, paying her way with part-time work. During her university years, she joined a band, in which she played the drums, and was once a member of a heavy metal band. In 1984, she graduated from Kobe with a bachelor's degree in business administration, then enrolled in the Matsushita Institute of Government and Management.

In 1987, Takaichi moved to the United States to work as a Matsushita Institute Congressional Fellow for Democratic congresswoman Patricia Schroeder, who had made a strong impression on Takaichi while campaigning for president. In 1989, upon her return to Japan, she worked as a legislative analyst with knowledge of American politics, and wrote books based on her experience. In March 1989, she became a presenter for TV Asahi, co-hosting the station's Kodawari TV Pre-Stage program with Renhō. In November 1990, Takaichi was employed as a presenter for Fuji Television, later serving as anchor of the morning information program Asa Da! Dō Naru.

== Political career ==
=== Political beginnings ===
Takaichi first attempted to run for the Nara Prefecture Electoral District of the House of Councillors during the 1992 House of Councillors elections. She eventually ran as an independent candidate and competed with Mitsuo Hattori for the post, after Mitsuo's father, Yasuji Hattori, decided not to run for the post. Of the 313 eligible voters, Takaichi lost to Hattori as Hattori received a total of 162 votes while Takaichi received a total of 137 votes and 1 invalid vote. Hattori was later proclaimed as the winner of the election.

=== Early legislative career (1993–2006) ===
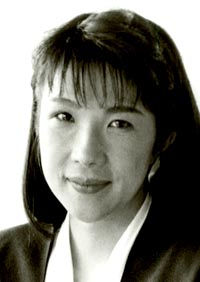
Takaichi in 1998

Takaichi was first elected to the Japanese parliament's lower house, the House of Representatives, in the 1993 Japanese general election as an independent. In 1994, she joined the minor "Liberals" party led by Koji Kakizawa, which soon merged into the New Frontier Party.

In 1994, Takaichi was pictured with other politicians for an advert in the magazine Tokyo Seikei Tsushin, endorsing a 1994 book titled "Hitler's Election Strategy". The book praises Adolf Hitler's ability to concentrate power and shape public opinion, emphasising there are lessons for Japan in this regard. The book says nothing of the Holocaust.

In 1996, Takaichi ran as a sanctioned candidate from the New Frontier Party and was re-elected to the House of Representatives, despite the New Frontier Party losing nationally. On 5 November, she responded to recruitment from the Secretary-General of the LDP Koichi Kato and joined the LDP. Her act of switching parties, two months after winning the election with anti-LDP votes, resulted in heavy criticism from New Frontier Party members.

In the LDP, Takaichi belonged to the Mori Faction, formally, the Seiwa Seisaku Kenkyūkai, and she served as a Parliamentary Vice Minister for the Ministry of International Trade and Industry under the Keizō Obuchi cabinet. She also served as chairman of the Education and Science Committee. In the 2000 House of Representatives election she was placed in first position on the LDP's proportional representation list and easily won her third term. In 2002, she was appointed as the Senior Vice Minister of the Ministry of Economy, Trade and Industry under Junichiro Koizumi.

In the 2003 Japanese general election, she was defeated in the Nara 1st district by Democratic Party lawmaker Sumio Mabuchi. She moved to the nearby city of Ikoma and won a seat representing the Nara 2nd district in the 2005 Japanese general election. In 2004, while she was out of the Diet, she took an economics faculty position at Kinki University.

=== Abe governments (2006–2007, 2012–2020) ===
Takaichi served as Minister of State for Okinawa and Northern Territories Affairs, Minister of State for Science and Technology Policy, Minister of State for Innovation, Minister of State for Youth Affairs and Gender Equality, and Minister of State for Food Safety in the Japanese Cabinet of Prime Minister Shinzō Abe. In August 2007, she was the only Abe cabinet member to join former prime minister Junichiro Koizumi in visiting Yasukuni Shrine on the anniversary of the end of World War II.

After the LDP's victory in the 2012 Japanese general election, Takaichi was appointed to head the party's Policy Research Council (自由民主党政務調査会長). In January 2013, she recommended that Abe issue an "Abe Statement" to replace the Murayama Statement that apologized for "tremendous damage and suffering" brought by Japan's "colonial rule and aggression". In 2015, the day before the 70th anniversary of the surrender of Japan, Abe gave the official Cabinet statement, declaring that previous apologies including Murayama's will "remain unshakeable" but arguing against current or future apologies. The statement was criticized by state media in China and North Korea, and Yonhap News Agency in South Korea.

In September 2014, Takaichi was selected as Minister of Internal Affairs and Communications to replace Yoshitaka Shindō. After she was named as a cabinet minister, a photograph was published of her in 2011 together with Kazunari Yamada, the leader of the National Socialist Japanese Workers' Party – a small neo-Nazi party in Japan. Yamada was also pictured with LDP policy chief Tomomi Inada. Yamada stated that the pictures were taken when he visited Inada and Takaichi's offices "for talks", according to his blog. Takaichi denied any link with Yamada and said she would not have accepted the picture had she known Yamada's background. Yamada has praised Adolf Hitler and the September 11 attacks and denied the Holocaust.

In 2014, Takaichi was among the three members of the cabinet to visit the controversial Yasukuni Shrine, became the first sitting cabinet member to attend the shrine's autumn festival in 2016, and was one of four cabinet ministers who visited Yasukuni on the 75th anniversary of the end of World War II in August 2020. In the December 2014 general election, she won an overwhelming 96,000-vote majority in her district, defeating the runner-up by 58,000 votes.

In February 2016, Takaichi commented that the government could suspend the operations of broadcasters that aired politically biased content. The U.S. State Department later described this as "[giving] rise to concerns about increasing government pressure against critical and independent media." An electoral redistricting in 2017, which Takaichi oversaw as internal affairs minister, eliminated one of Nara Prefecture's districts and resulted in Takaichi again potentially facing off with her former rival Sumio Mabuchi. Takaichi was replaced by Seiko Noda in August 2017, but returned to the Internal Affairs and Communications post in September 2019, replacing Masatoshi Ishida. Among other initiatives, she put pressure on NHK to cut its licence fee and reform its governance, and oversaw the distribution of cash handouts during the COVID-19 pandemic.

=== First leadership bid and Kishida Government (2021–2024) ===
In August 2021, Takaichi expressed her willingness to challenge Prime Minister Yoshihide Suga for the presidency of the LDP in the scheduled election on 29 September. On 3 September, Suga announced that he would not seek re-election; Takaichi officially announced her bid on 8 September with the support of former prime minister Abe. Takaichi was eliminated in the first round of voting, and Fumio Kishida was elected. Kishida reappointed her chairman of the LDP policy research council.

From August 2022, Takaichi served as Minister of State for Economic Security in Kishida's government. She was in charge of preparing a bill to implement a security clearance system for classified information relating to economic security. The lack of such a system had prevented Japan from joining the Five Eyes. The bill was made law by the Diet in May 2024.

On 2 March 2023, Hiroyuki Konishi, a House of Councillors member from the Constitutional Democratic Party of Japan, said that he obtained a government document indicating that the former Abe government may have intended to interfere with the freedom of broadcasting by putting pressure on broadcasters that were critical of the LDP. Takaichi was Minister of Internal Affairs and Communications at the time the document was said to have been created. When pressed during a committee session the following day, Takaichi said that the document was "fabricated" and vowed to resign from parliament if the document were proven genuine.

Several days later, on 7 March 2023, the Internal Affairs ministry confirmed that the document was created by ministerial officials, and opposition Diet members called on Takaichi to resign. Following the announcement, Takaichi held to her position that the remarks attributed to her within the document were fabricated, adding that Konishi should bear the burden of proving the document's authenticity.

In August 2023, Takaichi expressed concern that plans to sell the government's stake in Nippon Telegraph and Telephone could make Japan's telecommunications infrastructure vulnerable to China.

=== Later leadership bids (2024 and 2025) ===
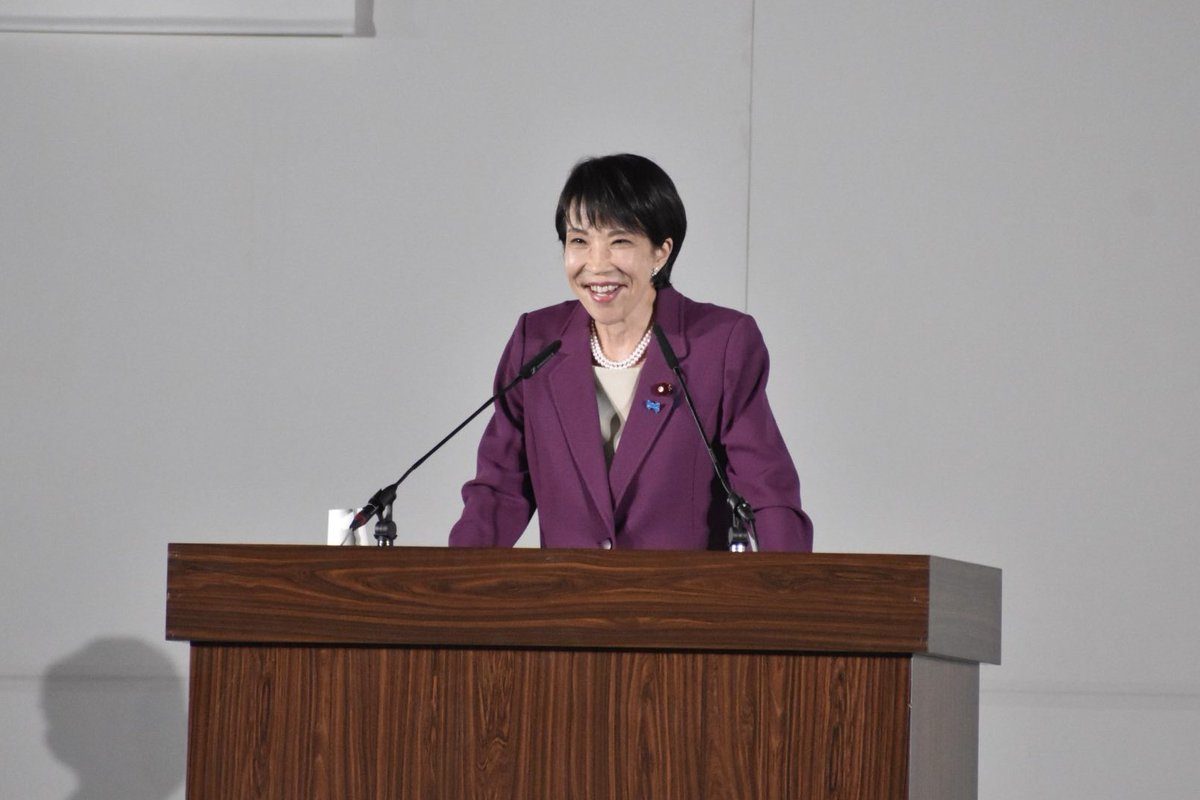
Takaichi giving a speech for LDP presidential election in Nagoya, September 2025

In August 2024, former prime minister Fumio Kishida announced that he would not seek re-election to his post as President of the LDP. On 9 September, Takaichi announced her second bid to become LDP leader. Among the nine contenders, Takaichi emerged as a frontrunner alongside Shigeru Ishiba and Shinjirō Koizumi. She came first in the first round of voting with 181 votes, but was defeated by Ishiba in the runoff election with 215 votes to Takaichi's 194 votes.

Ishiba offered Takaichi the post of chairman of the LDP General Council; she declined the offer. In November, she became head of the LDP's newly organised policy research commission on public safety and measures against terrorism and cybercrime.

Following Prime Minister Shigeru Ishiba's announcement of his resignation in September 2025, Takaichi announced her candidacy for LDP president in the resulting leadership election on 18 September 2025. In early polling, Takaichi and agricultural minister Shinjirō Koizumi were identified as the frontrunners. Ultimately, Takaichi won both rounds, defeating Koizumi with 185 votes to 156 votes in the runoff and becoming the first woman to hold the post of LDP president.

=== LDP presidency ===
Upon her election as party president, it was already speculated that a Takaichi government would accommodate an interest rate increase by the Bank of Japan early in her possible tenure as prime minister. After her election, the Nikkei 225 share index surged past the 47,000 level for the first time, and the value of the yen fell. The Nikkei rose over 4% to hit a record high and the index closed 4.75% higher at the end of the trading day, while the yen fell 1.8% against the dollar.

On 10 October, Komeito party leader Tetsuo Saito announced that his party would break with the LDP and leave the governing coalition, citing disagreements with Takaichi's leadership and the LDP's handling of the slush fund scandal. This development signified the collapse of the 26-year-old LDP–Komeito coalition. As a result, the parliamentary election to choose Japan's next prime minister was pushed back from 15 to 20 October. On 15 October, Takaichi asked Hirofumi Yoshimura, the leader of the Japan Innovation Party, to enter into a coalition with the LDP.

On 17 October, the National Diet voted to set 21 October as the session confirmation date. On 19 October, the LDP and the Japan Innovation Party agreed to form a coalition. The leaders of both parties signed a coalition agreement the following day, clearing Takaichi's path to the premiership. At the 21 October meeting of the National Diet, both houses nominated Takaichi to succeed Shigeru Ishiba as prime minister. Takaichi avoided a runoff in the lower house, garnering 237 votes against Constitutional Democratic Party leader Yoshihiko Noda's 149. She was officially appointed prime minister by Emperor Naruhito in a ceremony at the Tokyo Imperial Palace later that day. She became both the first woman and the first person from Nara Prefecture to hold the post.

== Premiership (2025–present) ==
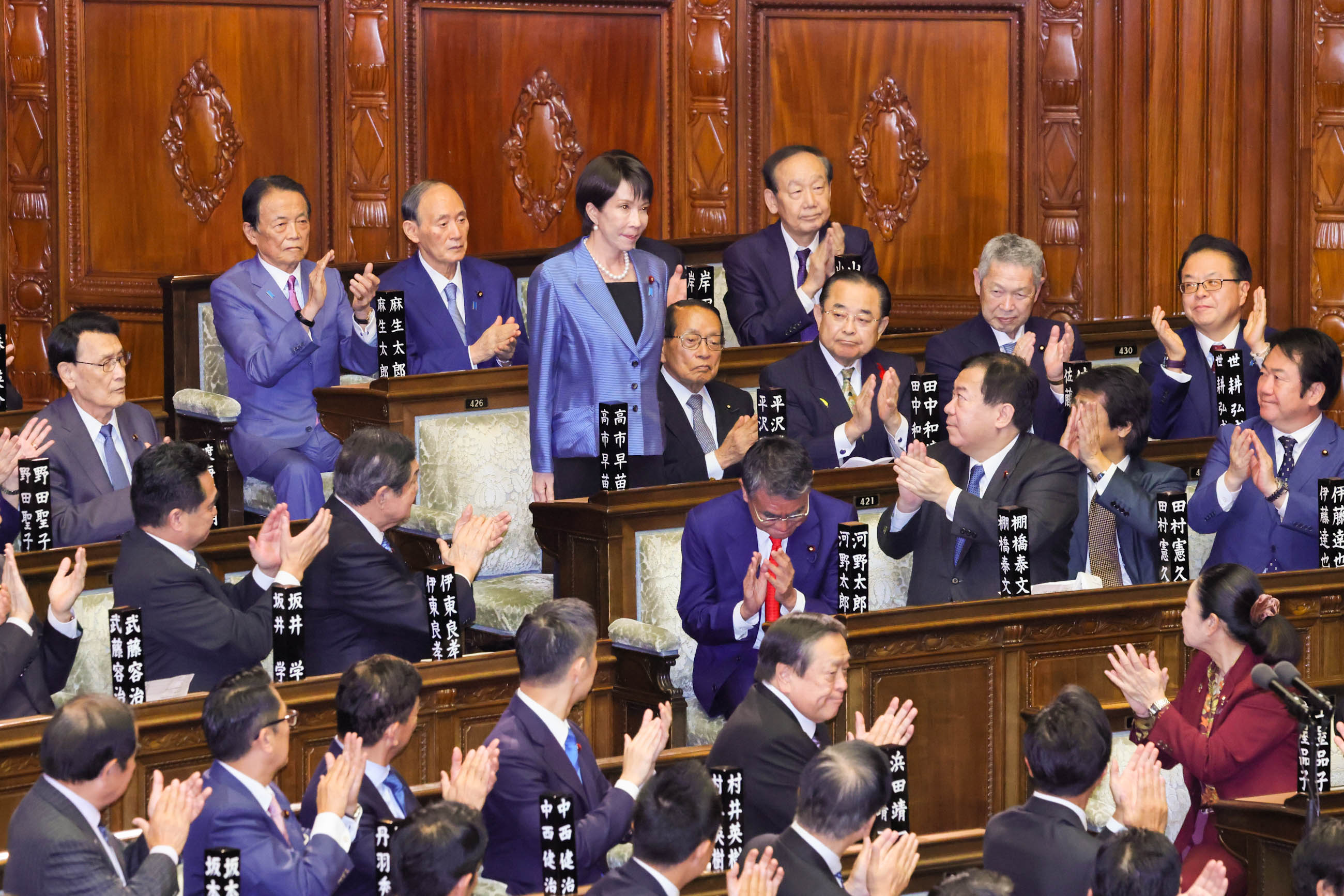
Takaichi is elected Prime Minister by the Diet, 21 October 2025

After becoming prime minister on 21 October, Takaichi formed her first cabinet. While she had said that she wanted her cabinet to include as many women as those in the Nordic countries, only two women actually joined the cabinet: Satsuki Katayama as Japan's first female finance minister, and Kimi Onoda as economic security minister. In her inaugural press conference, Takaichi said that she "prioritised equality of opportunity" above all else, and had selected ministers based on their qualifications, not gender.

The cabinet was viewed as favoring party unity, with Takaichi's rivals receiving key positions: Toshimitsu Motegi as foreign minister, Yoshimasa Hayashi as internal affairs minister and Shinjiro Koizumi as defense minister. Ishiba's confidant Ryosei Akazawa was promoted to minister of economy, trade and industry, showing a degree of continuity. Chief Cabinet Secretary Minoru Kihara, however, is ideologically aligned with Takaichi, a break from recent prime ministers.

During the first press conference of her premiership on 21 October 2025, Takaichi outlined her priorities such as tackling rising inflation and said that she would work to implement suspension of the provisional gasoline tax rate. According to local reports, Takaichi planned a ¥13.9 trillion ($92.19 billion) economic stimulus package as part of her first economic initiative policies aimed at "responsible proactive fiscal policy", with three main pillars: measures to counter inflation, investment in growth industries, and national security. Other proposals included the expansion of local government grants for small and medium-sized businesses and additional investments in technology such as artificial intelligence and semiconductors.

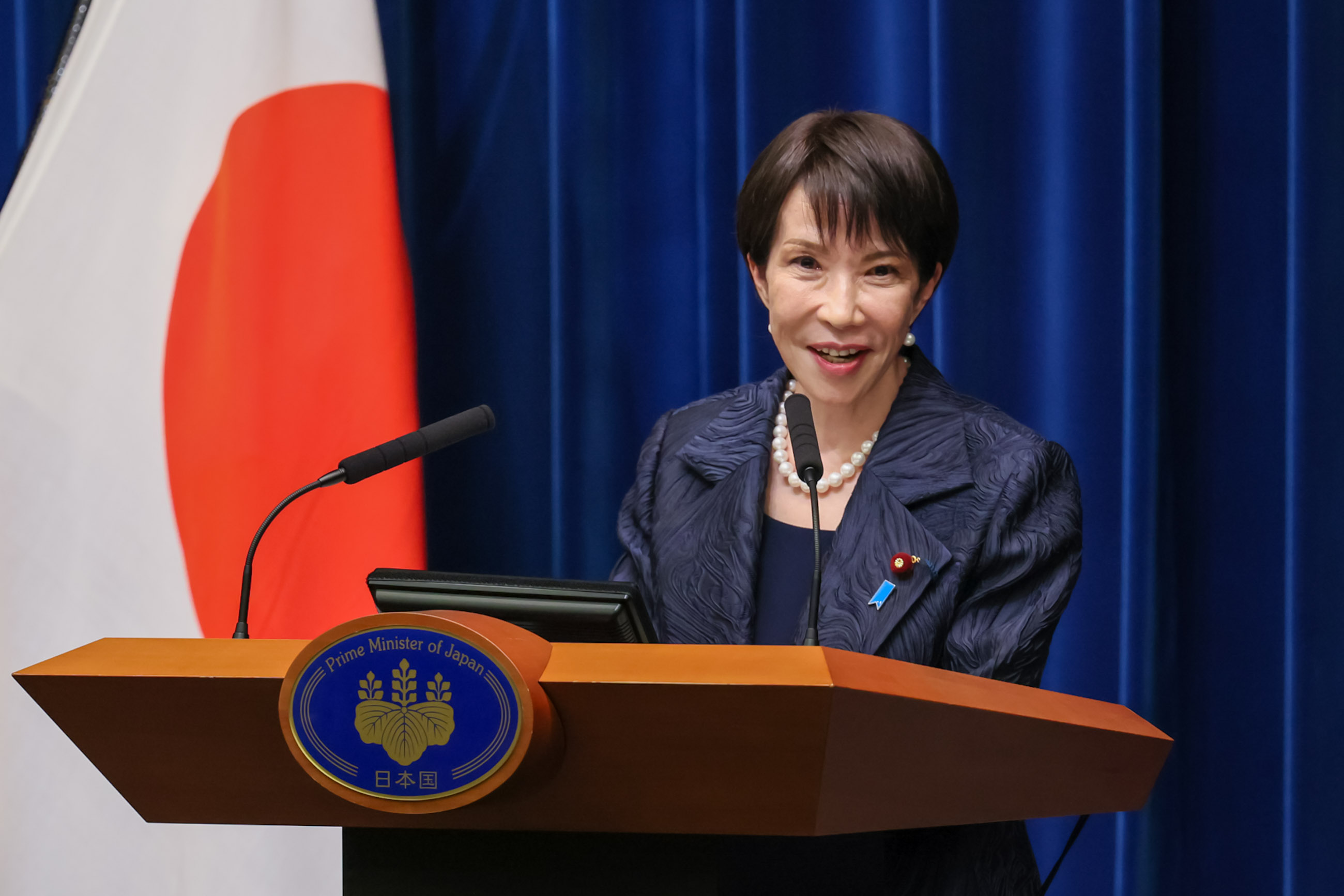
Prime Minister Takaichi speaks in front of reporters during her first press conference as prime minister at the Prime Minister's Residence on 21 October 2025

On 24 October 2025, during her first policy speech at the National Diet, Takaichi repeated her priorities in tackling inflation, fiscal spending, the creation of an economic growth panel, and her previous proposal on scrapping the provisional tax on gasoline. Takaichi stated that she would bring forward Japan's plans to raise annual military spending to 2% of GDP, announcing a new target of March 2026, rather than the previous target of 2027. Takaichi mentioned the need to continue Japan's alliance with the United States, while enhancing Japan's diplomacy to the international community.

Takaichi renewed her two predecessors' efforts to make Japan a leading asset management center and for their plan of setting up an agency for disaster prevention. Takaichi emphasized the need for immigrant labor, saying that foreign workers were still needed to supplement Japan's declining population. She highlighted the need to balance labor market needs and the increasing immigrant population, noting that Japan's acceptance of migrants was premised on their compliance with Japan's rules and laws, and vowed to strengthen regulations to enforce compliance.

=== 2026 general election and second cabinet ===
On 23 January 2026, Takaichi dissolved the House of Representatives, allowing a general election to be held on 8 February. The election resulted in a historic landslide victory for the LDP, with the party winning an outright two-thirds supermajority and regaining its majority status in the chamber. The LDP's total of at least 316 seats is the most ever won by a party in the Diet's Lower House in Japanese electoral history. Analysts credited the party's victory to Takaichi's high personal popularity at the time of the election. She was especially popular among young voters, with one poll finding that 84 percent of respondents in their 20s and 78 percent of those in their 30s backed the prime minister and her cabinet (compared with 67 percent of voters overall).

In July 2026, the National Diet passed amendments to the Imperial Household Law, allowing the Imperial House of Japan to adopt distant male relatives over the age of 15 and letting women keep their royal status after marrying non-royals, but otherwise keeping the requirement that the emperor be male. In the same month, the National Diet passed the Law Concerning the Punishment of Damage to the National Flag, which criminalizes the desecration of the flag of Japan. She proposed amendments to the Foreign Exchange and Foreign Trade Act, leading to the creation of the Japan Foreign Investment Committee to review foreign investments in the Japanese economy. She also oversaw the passage of a law that led to the creation of the National Intelligence Council and the National Intelligence Bureau on 31 July 2026.

=== Public opinion ===
In opinion polls conducted during late October–early November 2025, Takaichi's government received the approval of between 65% and 83% of respondents, among the highest such ratings of any government in twenty years. In a survey conducted by Jiji Press on July 16, 2026, Takaichi's approval rating dropped to 49% citing that the reasons for the drop in support are the delay in high price measures, the "slander video" issue, 2026 amendment for the Imperial Household Law, the emphasis on the "vice-capital plan" and the Law Concerning the Punishment of Damage to the National Flag.

=== Foreign policy ===
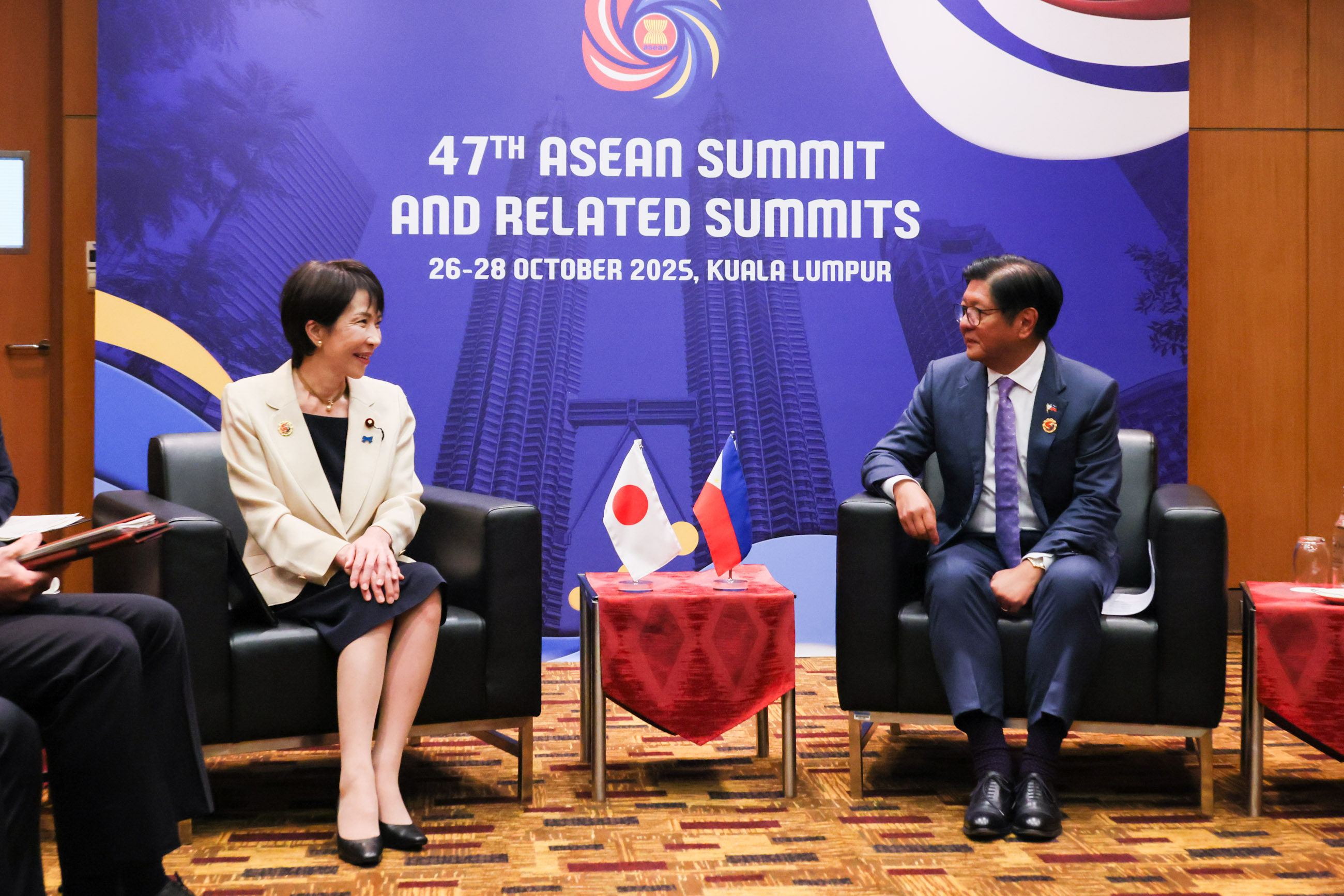
Takaichi meets with Philippine president Bongbong Marcos during the 47th ASEAN Summit in Kuala Lumpur, 25 October 2025

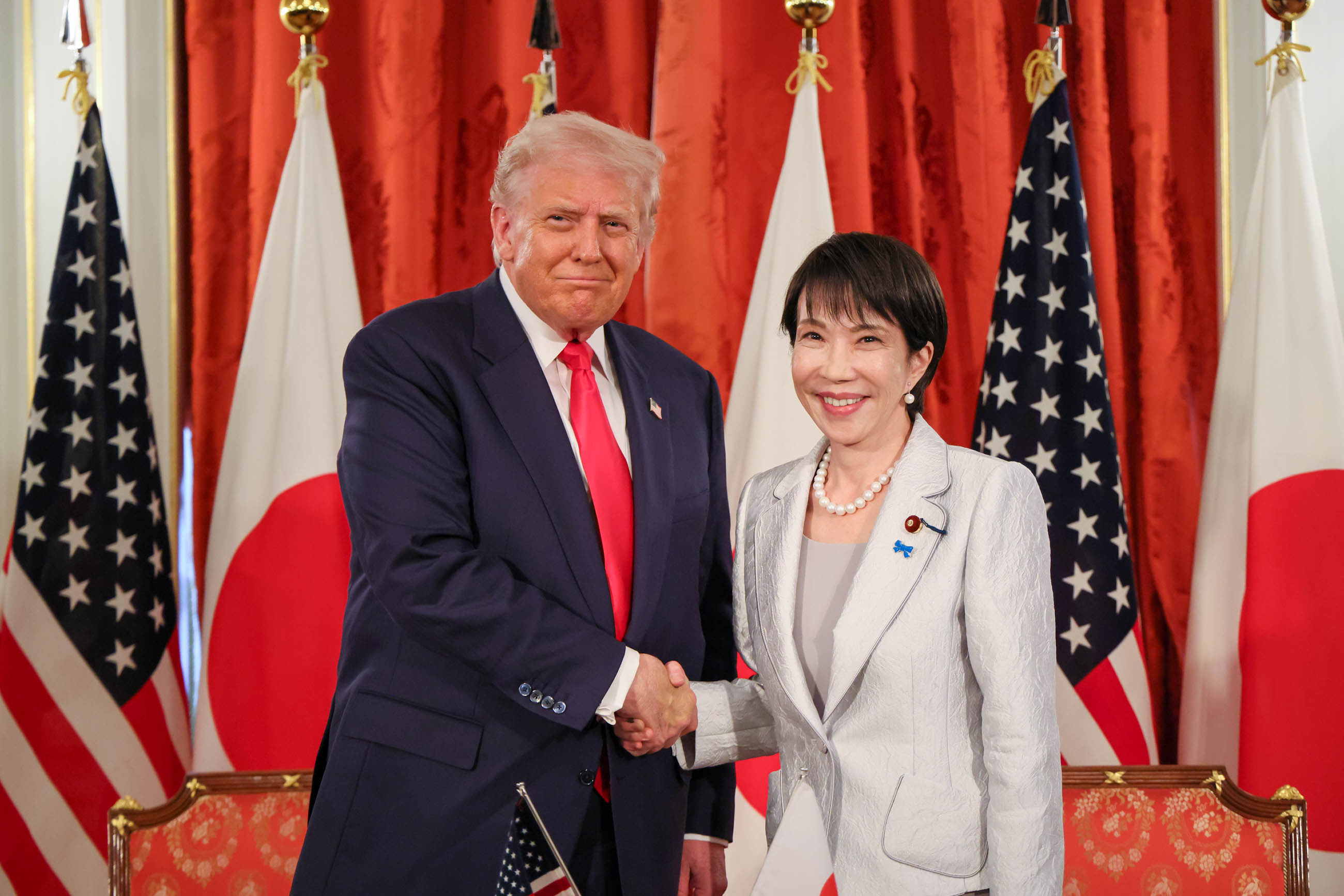
Takaichi with US president Donald Trump during their bilateral meeting at the Akasaka Palace in Tokyo, 28 October 2025

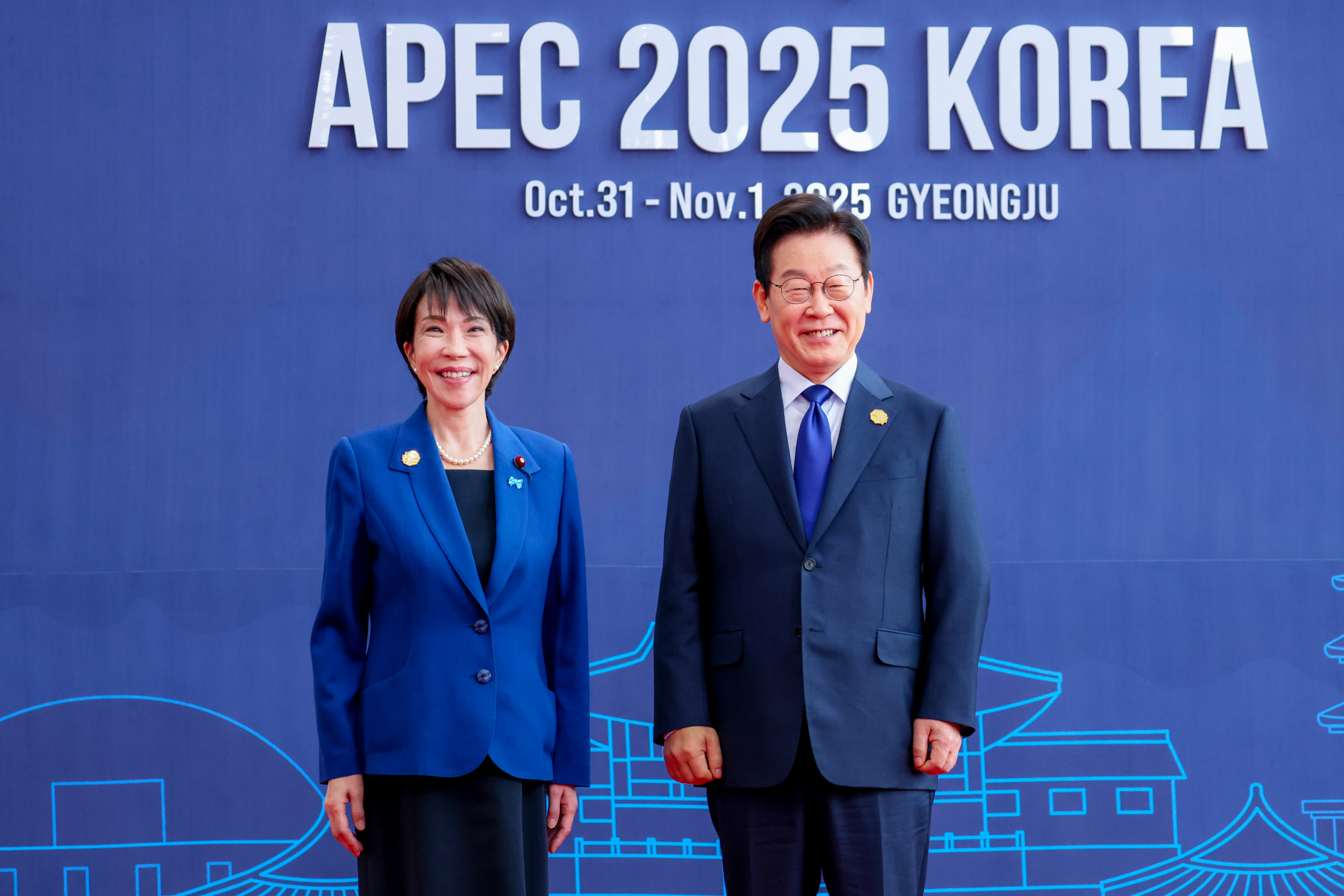
Takaichi with South Korean president Lee Jae Myung during the 2025 APEC South Korea Summit in Gyeongju, 31 October 2025

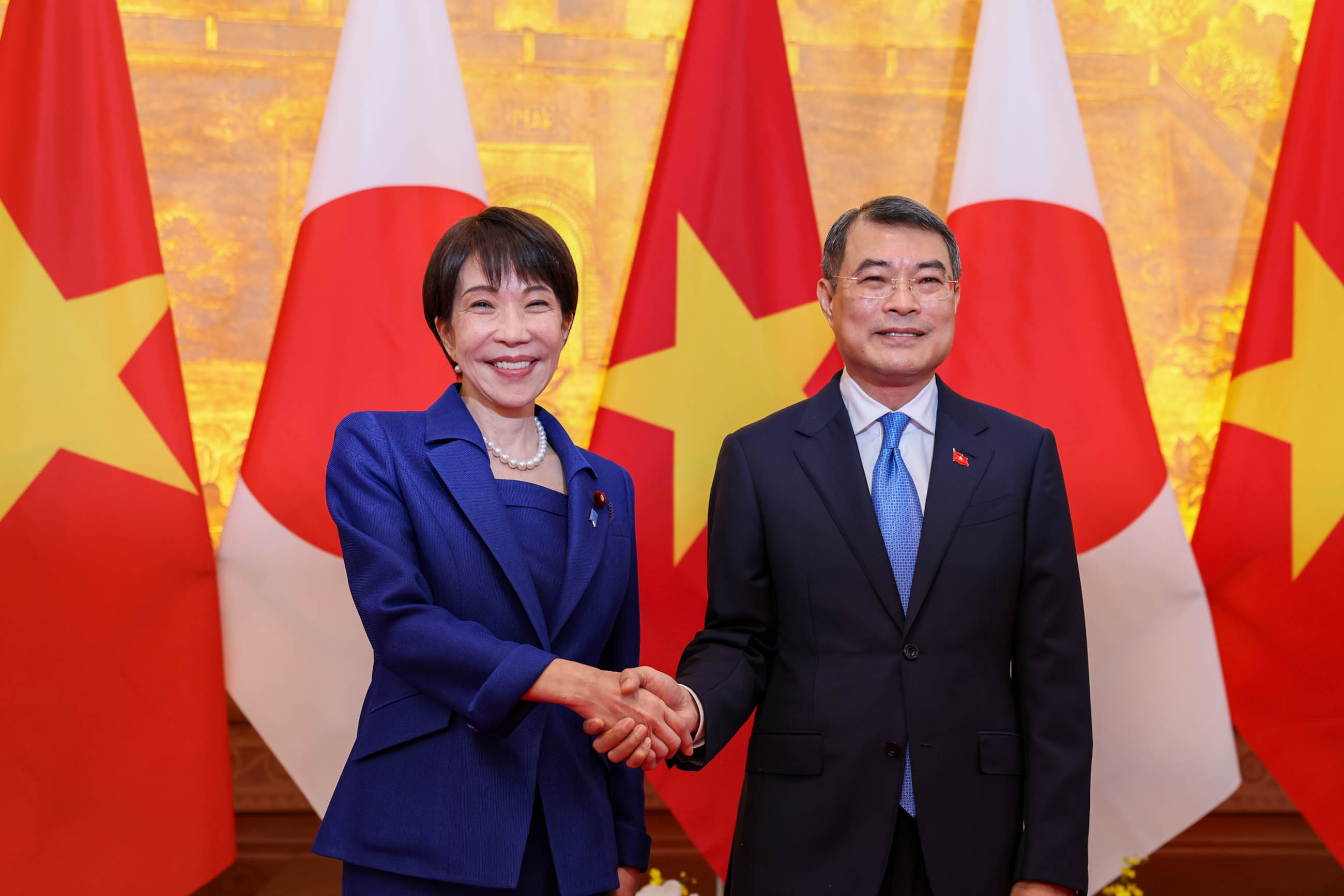
Takaichi with Vietnam Prime minister Lê Minh Hưng during their bilateral meeting in Hanoi, 2 May 2026

Takaichi made her diplomatic debut at the 47th ASEAN Summit in Kuala Lumpur, Malaysia, where she made efforts to strengthen cooperation on the maritime, artificial intelligence, and cybersecurity sectors. She also held bilateral meetings with Philippine president Bongbong Marcos, Malaysian prime minister Anwar Ibrahim, and Australian prime minister Anthony Albanese. During the ASEAN meeting, Takaichi also attended the ASEAN+3 Summit, the ASEAN–Japan Summit, the 20th East Asia Summit, and the Second ASEAN Global Dialogue. Takaichi skipped the remaining events of the summit, flying back to Tokyo to meet with US president Donald Trump the next day.

Takaichi met with Trump on 28 October 2025 at the Akasaka Palace. The two leaders signed agreements on trade, minerals, nuclear technology and rare earths. Takaichi also expressed her intent to strengthen the US–Japan alliance. After their meeting, Takaichi gave Trump a putter formerly owned by former prime minister Shinzo Abe, a golf ball signed by Japanese professional golfer Hideki Matsuyama, and a gold-leaf golf ball. During their visit at the US Yokosuka Naval Base, aboard the USS George Washington (CVN-73), Takaichi vowed to bring the US–Japan alliance into a "golden age", amid a "severe security environment". According to Trump's press secretary, she also told Trump privately she would recommend him for the Nobel Peace Prize.

Chinese leader Xi Jinping made an unusual move by not sending a congratulatory telegram on the day Takaichi assumed the post of prime minister, but a Japan-China summit meeting between Xi and Takaichi was held on 31 October. There, the two sides agreed to promote a "mutually beneficial relationship based on common strategic interests." However, since Prime Minister Takaichi held talks with Taiwan's former Vice Premier Lin Hsin-i on 1 November, China lodged a protest with Japan, and Japan counter-argued, leading to the deterioration of the relationship.

During deliberations in the House of Representatives' budget committee on 7 November, Takaichi said that a Chinese attack on Taiwan could constitute an "existential crisis situation" for Japan, allowing the country to take military action in self-defence. In response to the comments, the Chinese consul-general in Osaka, Xue Jian, wrote on X on that "we have no choice but to cut off that dirty neck that has lunged at us without a moment's hesitation. Are you ready?" (Note: Original Japanese text: 勝手に突っ込んできたその汚い首は一瞬のちゅうちょもなく斬ってやるしかない。覚悟ができているのか) Although the post was later deleted after protest by the Japanese government, it led to a diplomatic row between Japan and China. In addition to cross-party calls in Japan for his expulsion, Xue's comment triggered criticism from the Taiwanese government and the US ambassador to Japan, while Chinese officials condemned Takaichi's remarks. Japan and China issued mutual travel advisories and summoned the other country's ambassador. China subsequently dispatched China Coast Guard vessels and military drones to patrol through the Senkaku Islands. In May and June 2025, the Chinese People's Liberation Army Navy (PLAN) deployed its aircraft carriers, the Liaoning and the Shandong, for simultaneous operations in the Pacific Ocean for the first time.

In September 2026, she met with UN Secretary- general Antonio Guterres during the United Nations General Assembly to discuss reforms to the UN Security Council. Japan, along with India, Brazil, and Germany seeks permanent seats on an expanded Security council.

== Political views ==
Takaichi has been described as holding hard-line conservative and Japanese nationalist views, citing former British prime minister Margaret Thatcher as a role model and deeply influential on her personal political beliefs. (Note: Attributed to multiple sources) Like Thatcher, she is called the "Iron Lady". (Note: Attributed to multiple sources) Takaichi is a member of Nippon Kaigi, a far-right ultraconservative organisation that argues for a reinterpretation of Japanese history along ultranationalist lines.

Taro Kono, another LDP minister and member of the House of Representatives, has said that Takaichi is on the far right of the political spectrum within the LDP. Takaichi has been described as "far-right" by Deutsche Welle, the Tokyo Review, Carnegie Endowment for International Peace and the South China Morning Post, and various sources including Time magazine, the Los Angeles Times, The New York Times, The Guardian, Politico, Foreign Policy and the Public Broadcasting Service (PBS) have described her as "ultraconservative". She has also been described as an "ultranationalist" by The Conversation and Democracy Now!, and as having an "ultranationalist agenda" by Ming Gao of Lund University.

=== Globalism ===
At the House of Councillors Budget Committee meeting on 13 November 2025, in response to a question that criticized "policy promotion driven by excessive globalism," Takaichi stated that "globalization has contributed to the development of the world economy."

=== Immigration ===
Like her fellow candidates in the 2025 LDP leadership election, Takaichi has been described as taking a "hard-line stance" on immigration. The New York Times stated that during her leadership campaign "she seized on a wave of anti-immigrant sentiment". Specifically she has been described as wanting "tighter restrictions on immigration" and employed "anti-immigration rhetoric" during her campaign.

During the campaign she called for a "crackdown" on illegal migration and emphasized that "foreigners must strictly obey" Japanese law, stating that those who overstay their visa or abscond from justice should be treated as harshly as Japanese citizens. She proposed that policies be reconsidered from the ground up, with the aim of establishing an "orderly coexistence" between Japanese citizens and immigrants based on "mutual consideration" in communities. In her campaign manifesto she also proposed establishing an agency to tackle issues such as visa overstays, overtourism, and land purchases by foreign nationals, particularly near defense facilities and strategic assets. On refugees, she explicitly stated: "For those who come [to Japan] with financial motives and claim that they are refugees, I'll have you go home."

At the LDP leadership debate on 30 September 2024, she stated that she was "not considering setting quotas for people who stay legally." Takaichi has supported policies that increase the inflow of foreigners, such as "Training and Employment", and the expansion of industries covered by the Technical Intern Training Program. She has been evaluated as a promoter of policies expanding the acceptance of foreign labor.

In November 2025, Takaichi sent a congratulatory telegram to the "National Association for Support of Coexistence with Foreign Human Resources" (NAGOMi) for its 21st national forum in Tokyo. The association was established with the efforts of Toshihiro Nikai, and aims to "develop a nationwide 'global human resources coexistence network,' cooperate with the government and prefectures, appropriately train, protect, and support foreign workers including technical interns, and contribute to the realization of a multicultural society without discrimination."

On 23 January, the Takaichi Cabinet decided to expand the sectors covered by Specified Skilled Worker and Training and Employment. "Linen supply," "logistics warehouses," and "resource circulation" were added.

She has argued that comprehensive restrictions on land acquisition by foreigners would be difficult, stating that "banning land acquisition in Japan solely for foreigners or foreign corporations would violate several bilateral investment treaties and also the WTO’s GATS," and therefore regulations would have to be nationality‑neutral. In the guidelines announced on 20 January 2026, no restrictions on land ownership by foreigners or foreign corporations were included; only efforts to understand the actual situation were mentioned. In June 2026, the Takaichi administration decided to postpone regulations on the acquisition of condominiums and other real estate by foreigners.

Since around 2010, the LDP has promoted policies to expand the acceptance of foreigners under the pretext of securing labor. Under the Abe administration, the number of foreign workers increased by more than one million, and the number of foreign residents, which was around 2 million at the end of 2012, reached approximately 3.96 million by the end of FY2025. In the policy guidelines announced by the LDP's Foreign Resident Policy Headquarters on 20 January 2026, no policy to restrict the increase in foreigners was included. Instead, it stated that "appropriate and smooth acceptance of foreigners and the realization of orderly local communities" are "essential," and only stricter measures against crimes committed by foreigners were mentioned.

Takaichi has said that Japan requires foreign workers. Until 2028, her government plans to accept 1.23 million labour migrants.

=== Economics ===
Takaichi supports maintaining Shinzo Abe's policy of Abenomics. During the 2025 LDP leadership election, she said she would consider paying for an economic stimulus plan by issuing bonds to service the national debt.

During her 2021 run for LDP leader, she put forward a three-pronged "Plan to Strengthen the Japanese Economy", also known as "New Abenomics" or "Sanaenomics". The first prong is expansionary monetary policy, the second prong is "flexible fiscal spending in response to crises," and the third prong is "bold investment in crisis management and growth". The plan places particular emphasis on "bold crisis management and growth investment", which will involve large-scale fiscal spending and the development of legal systems and new economic bonds.

Takaichi has advocated for tax increases on corporations. She has considered raising taxes on cash deposits rather than retained earnings, and in September 2021 she estimated that "a 1% tax on corporate cash deposits would increase tax revenue by 2 trillion yen. Even if companies with capital of 100 million yen or less are excluded, tax revenue would increase by 1 trillion yen."

=== Social issues ===
Takaichi has expressed socially conservative views on several issues. She said in December 2020 that proposed legislation to recognize separate family names for married couples could "destroy the social structure based on family units", and led an LDP group of legislators opposed to the change. Takaichi also opposes revising the Imperial Household Law to allow women to ascend the Chrysanthemum Throne again. While opposing the legalization of same-sex marriage, she has also said that "there should be no prejudice against sexual orientation or gender identity" and expressed support in "promoting understanding itself."

Noting a discrepancy in the existing law, which criminalises causing damage to foreign, but not Japanese flags, she proposed and supported a bill to penalize damaging the Japanese flag with "imprisonment for two years or less, or a fine of up to 200,000 yen (about $1,930)".

=== Foreign policy ===
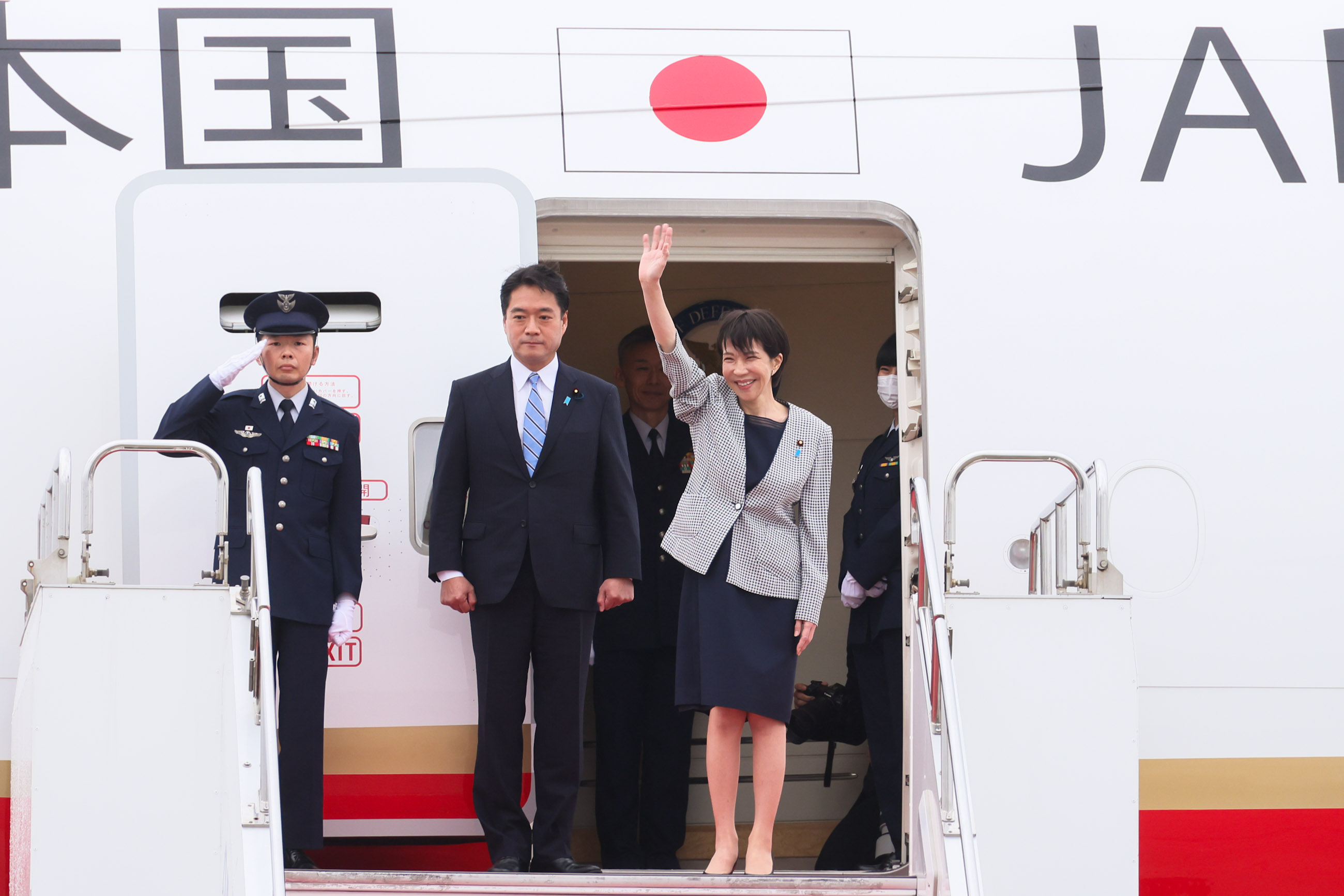
Takaichi waves outside the Japanese Air Force One as she visits Malaysia for the 47th ASEAN Summit.

Takaichi, like all other candidates in the 2025 LDP leadership election, supports revising article nine of the Japanese constitution to include mention of the Japan Self-Defence Forces. In 2021, she advocated revising the constitution to reposition the Self-Defense Forces as a "National Army", and increasing defense spending to promote the procurement of advanced equipment and research and development. She stated that in the event of war, "it is important to neutralize enemy bases first." She has proposed the adoption of anti-espionage legislation, something also supported by opposition parties such as the Democratic Party for the People. She is also in favour of the creation of a national intelligence agency.

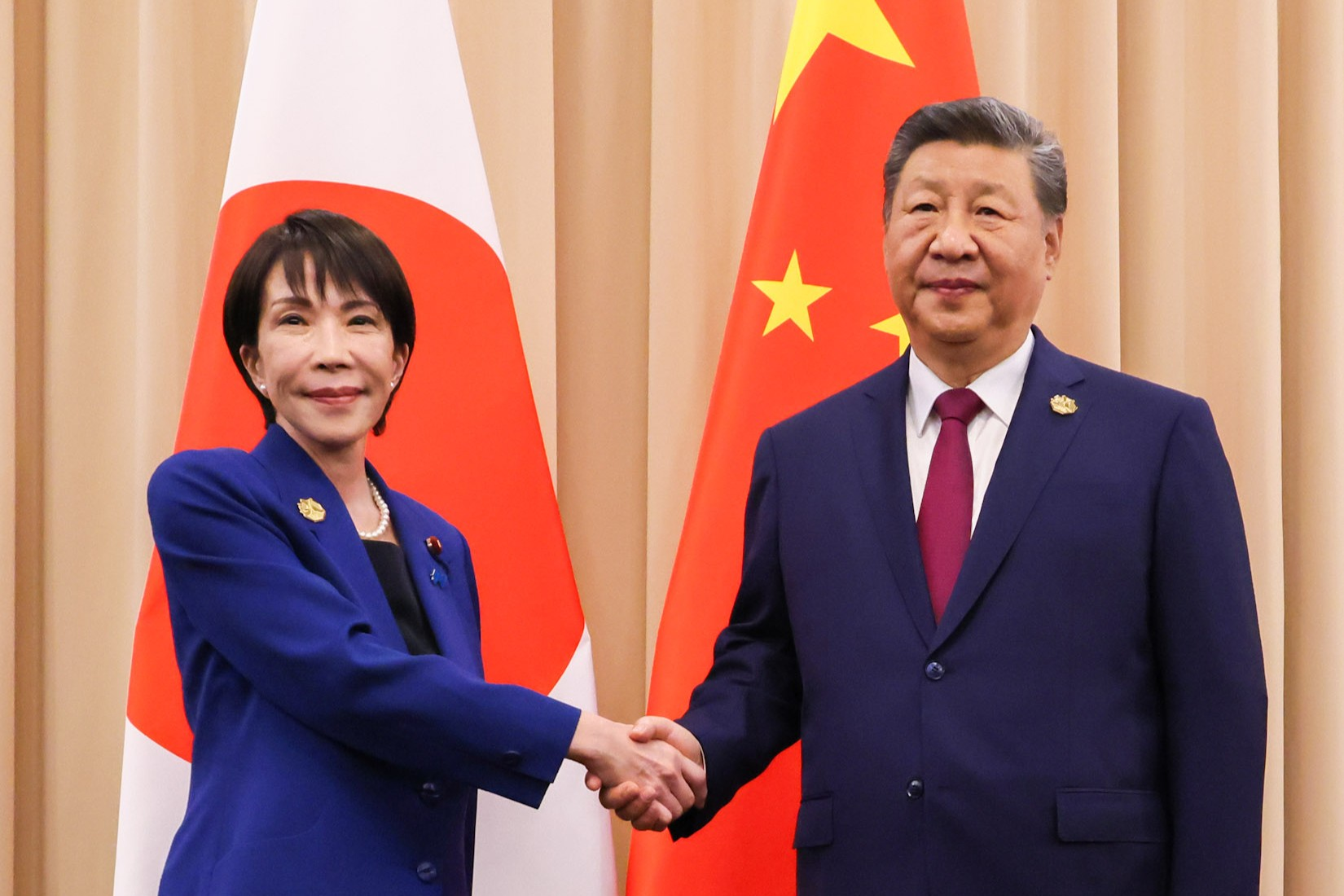
Takaichi with Chinese leader Xi Jinping during the APEC South Korea 2025, 31 October 2025

Takaichi has been critical of Chinese economic practices such as intellectual property theft, and has voiced support for reducing economic dependence on China. She has argued for deployment of US medium-range missiles to Japan, and the removal of marine buoys placed by China in waters both countries claim as part of the Senkaku Islands dispute. In April 2025, she visited Taiwan and met with President Lai Ching-te. She has repeated Shinzo Abe's statement that a "Taiwan emergency is a Japan emergency." During the 2021 Liberal Democratic Party leadership election, in which she placed third, her stance on China was the most hawkish of any candidate.

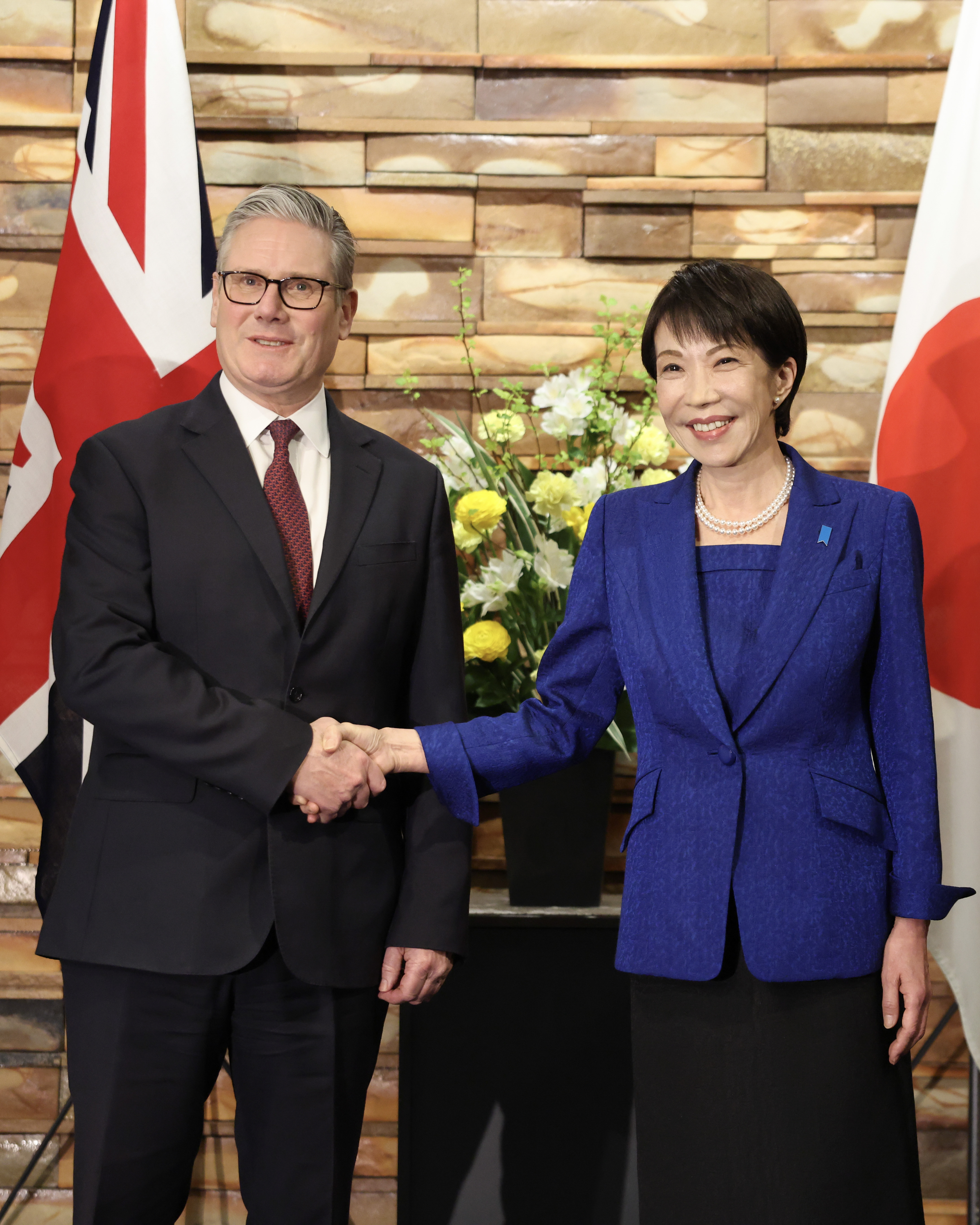
Takaichi with then-British Prime Minister Keir Starmer, 31 January 2026

In 2008, Takaichi published a statement on protests calling for revision of the U.S.–Japan Status of Forces Agreement (SOFA), following the arrest of a US marine in Okinawa on suspicion of child rape. Takaichi argued the US was unlikely to approve a more favorable extradition agreement, as the US would not accept the Japanese judicial system's barring of a defense attorney presence during interrogations, and could also weaken its military commitment to Japan. She also argued that changing the SOFA with the US could lead to a change in the SOFA between the United Nations and Iraq, exposing the Japanese Iraq Reconstruction and Support Group to Iraqi jurisdiction.

On nuclear weapons policy, she has said "It is contradictory to say that we will adhere to the Three Non-Nuclear Principles while gaining deterrence under the US nuclear umbrella." She has argued for the consideration of allowing US nuclear weapons into Japanese territory on land and sea in an emergency. In March 2022, she said that "Ukraine is not a distant issue", pointing to Russian military bases in the Kuril Islands, as well as China.

=== Japanese war crimes in World War II ===
Takaichi has been described as holding revisionist views regarding Japan's conduct during the Second World War.

Takaichi has made multiple visits to Yasukuni Shrine, which is viewed as controversial in China and Korea, primarily surrounding its enshrinement of Japanese Second World War-era Class A war criminals. She made visits in April and August 2024, both times signing as minister of state. She also visited in August 2025, on the 80th anniversary of the surrender of Japan. In the 2021 LDP leadership race, she said she would continue to visit the shrine if elected prime minister, but in the 2025 race avoided commenting on the question.

In 2022, Takaichi made remarks about the Yasukuni Shrine issue that were controversial in South Korea. She said, "When we act ambiguously, such as stopping our visits to Yasukuni Shrine midway, the other side climbs up," using the derogatory Japanese word tsukeagaru, which means "to take advantage of someone's politeness or kindness and act impudently". She went on to say that continuing to visit the shrine would eventually make "neighbouring countries...look foolish and stop complaining".

Takaichi has said that war crimes committed by Japan in World War II have been exaggerated. She takes a negative view of the Kono and Murayama statements, which issued apologies for Japanese war crimes, including the use of comfort women. In an appearance on a television program on 18 August 2002, Takaichi was asked, "Do you think Japan's war after the Manchurian Incident was a war of self-defence?" to which she replied, "I think it was a war for security."

In 2004, Takaichi wrote a column on her website regarding the Japanese history textbook controversies. She defended recent comments by Nariaki Nakayama, the Minister of Education, Culture, Sports, Science and Technology (MEXT) that textbooks were "extremely self-deprecating" and should continue decreasing usage of terms including "comfort women" and "forced labor". She wrote that the Imperial Japanese Armed Forces made "overseas advances" (海外での進軍, kaigai deno shingun) that textbooks termed as "invasion" (侵略, shinryaku), while foreign offensives like the Soviet invasion of Manchuria were termed "southward advance" (南下, nanka).

She argued against the inclusion by some school textbooks of China's death toll estimate for the Nanjing massacre. She recounted her complaint to MEXT against textbooks that included criticism of the government's Act on National Flag and Anthem and of then–Prime Minister Junichiro Koizumi's visits to Yasukuni Shrine. She said it was "clear" that Japan's Imperial Rescript showed an "intent to wage a war of self-defense".

=== Japanese imperial succession debate ===
Takaichi is not in favour of female succession. However, in the past she has said "I'm not opposed to a female emperor. I'm opposed to a matrilineal emperor." Adding "In reality, I imagine it would be difficult for a woman to succeed to the throne." Before finally stating "it would be better to restore the former imperial families to the imperial family." She later changed her position and is now opposed to female succession.

== Personal life ==
Takaichi married a fellow member of the House of Representatives, Taku Yamamoto, in 2004. They have no children together, but Takaichi adopted Yamamoto's three children from a previous marriage. They divorced in July 2017, with Takaichi citing differing political views and aspirations as the reason. They remarried in December 2021. She has four grandchildren through her stepchildren. After undergoing surgery for a gynecological disease, Takaichi found it difficult to conceive and give birth, and gave up on having children. In 2007, she said, "I want society to be welcoming to infertile women."

During her first marriage, Takaichi assumed her husband's family name legally, but continued to use her maiden name in public life. Upon remarriage, Taku Yamamoto took the name Takaichi instead, fulfilling the legal requirement that married couples have the same family name. Yamamoto suffered from a cerebral infarction in 2025, leaving the right side of his body paralysed. Takaichi serves as his caregiver. Despite being members of opposing political parties, Takaichi is known to be friends with former prime minister and opposition leader Yoshihiko Noda; Noda was Takaichi's senior during their time at the Matsushita Institute of Government and Management. Since becoming prime minister, Takaichi's popularity among younger voters has resulted in her choices of handbags, fashion, and stationery becoming sold out; this has been dubbed as "Sana-mania".

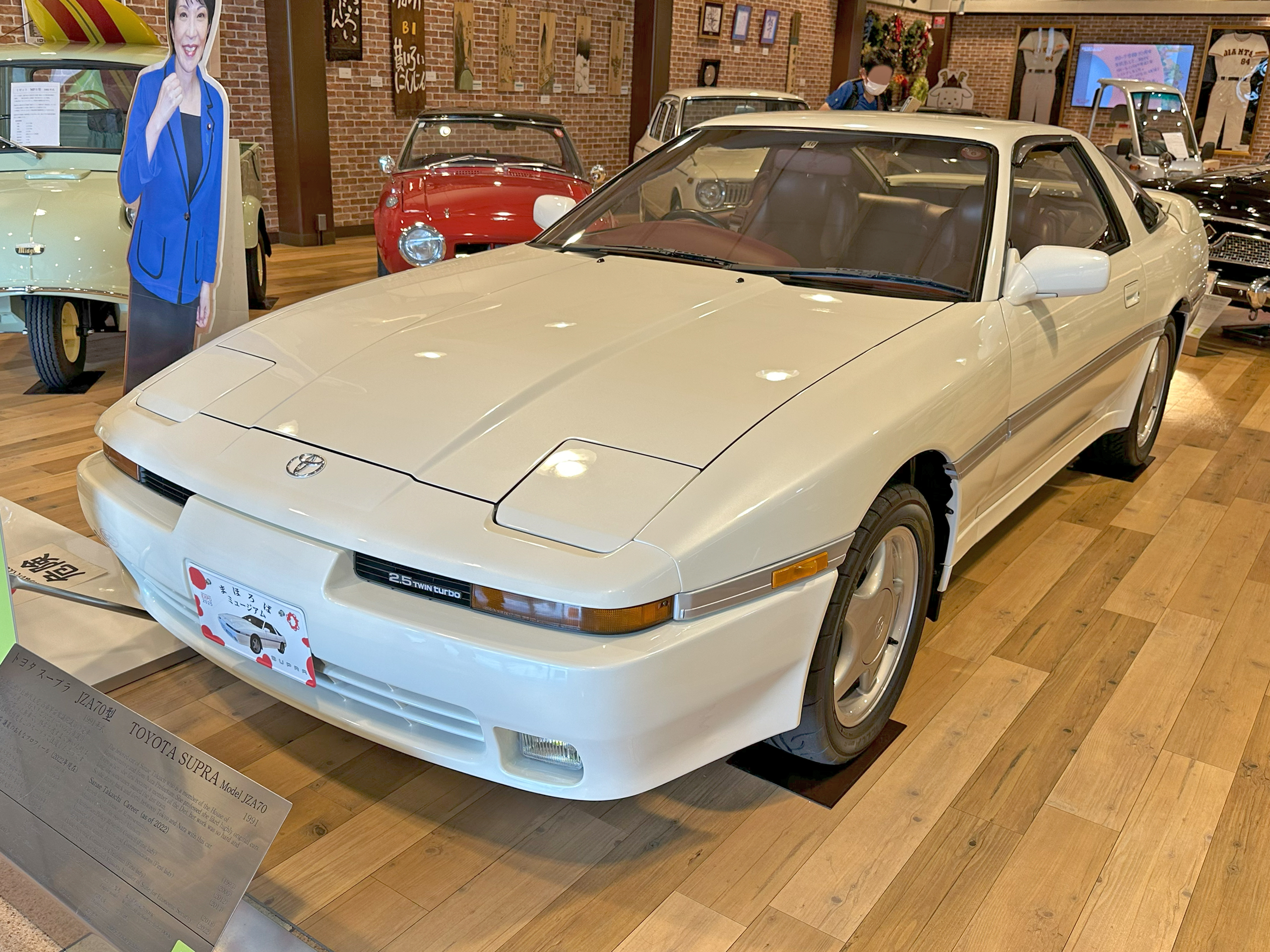
Takaichi's Toyota Supra A70, displayed in a museum in Nara

Takaichi is an avid fan of JRA horse racing, a heavy metal and Japanese rock listener, especially from artists Demon Kakka, B'z, and X Japan, and is a supporter of sporting teams such as Gamba Osaka and Hanshin Tigers. Takaichi was known to play the drums and the piano during her youth. She also holds a title of Honorary Sommelier and has an interest in motorcycles, having owned a Kawasaki Z400. She also was given the nickname "Sana-Metal, さなーめたる" by Japanese all female metal band Babymetal on their podcast which Takaichi was a guest.

Takaichi reportedly practices judo, karate, and scuba diving. She is a car enthusiast, owning a 1991 Toyota Supra A70 2.5GT Twin-Turbo Limited during her early years in parliament, during which she used the car to drive to her workplace for over 20 years. Takaichi's Supra A70 served as a replacement to her Toyota Supra Celica XX. The car is currently on display in a local Toyota dealership museum in Nara. Takaichi is a member of the Parliamentarians' League for Japan's Anime, Manga, and Games. Takaichi has also been noted to be interested in manga, such as Bari Bari Densetsu.

== Electoral history ==
| Election | Age | District | Political party | Number of votes | election results |
|---|---|---|---|---|---|
| 1992 Japanese House of Councillors election | 31 | Nara at-large district | Independent | 159,274 | lost |
| 1993 Japanese general election | 32 | Nara At-large | Independent | 131,345 | won |
| 1996 Japanese general election | 35 | Nara 1st district | NFP | 60,507 | won |
| 2000 Japanese general election | 39 | Kinki proportional representation block | LDP | ー | won |
| 2003 Japanese general election | 42 | Nara 1st district | LDP | 65,538 | lost |
| 2005 Japanese general election | 44 | Nara 2nd district | LDP | 92,096 | won |
| 2009 Japanese general election | 48 | Nara 2nd district | LDP | 94,879 | elected by PR |
| 2012 Japanese general election | 51 | Nara 2nd district | LDP | 86,747 | won |
| 2014 Japanese general election | 53 | Nara 2nd district | LDP | 96,218 | won |
| 2017 Japanese general election | 56 | Nara 2nd district | LDP | 124,508 | won |
| 2021 Japanese general election | 60 | Nara 2nd district | LDP | 141,858 | won |
| 2024 Japanese general election | 63 | Nara 2nd district | LDP | 128,554 | won |
| 2026 Japanese general election | 64 | Nara 2nd district | LDP | 193,708 | won |

== Notes ==
House of Representatives (Japan)
| Multi-member constituency | Member of the House of Representatives for Nara at-large district (multi-member); 1993–1996 | Constituency abolished |
| New constituency | Member of the House of Representatives for Nara 1st district 1996–2000 | Succeeded by Masahiro Morioka |
| Proportional representation | Member of the House of Representatives for Kinki; 2000–2003 | Proportional representation |
| Preceded by Tetsuji Nakamura | Member of the House of Representatives for Nara 2nd district 2005–2009 | Succeeded by Makoto Taki |
| Proportional representation | Member of the House of Representatives for Kinki; 2009–2012 | Proportional representation |
| Preceded by Makoto Taki | Member of the House of Representatives for Nara 2nd district 2012–present | Incumbent |
Political offices
| Preceded by Yuriko Koike | Minister of State for Okinawa and Northern Territories Affairs; 2006–2007 | Succeeded by Fumio Kishida |
| Preceded by Iwao Matsuda | Minister of State for Science and Technology Policy; 2006–2007 | Succeeded by Fumio Kishida |
| Preceded by Iwao Matsuda | Minister of State for Food Safety; 2006–2007 | Succeeded by Shinya Izumi |
| Preceded by Kuniko Inoguchi | Minister of State for Gender Equality and Social Affairs; 2006–2007 | Succeeded by Yōko Kamikawa |
| New office | Minister of State for Innovation; 2006–2007 | Position abolished |
| Preceded by Yoshitaka Shindō | Minister for Internal Affairs and Communications; 2014–2017 | Succeeded by Seiko Noda |
| Preceded by Masatoshi Ishida | Minister for Internal Affairs and Communications; 2019–2020 | Succeeded by Ryota Takeda |
| Preceded by Takayuki Kobayashi | Minister of State for Science and Technology Policy; Minister of State for Space Policy; Minister of State for Economic Security; 2022–2024 | Succeeded by Minoru Kiuchi |
| Preceded by Kenji Wakamiya | Minister of State for Intellectual Property Strategy; 2022–2024 | Succeeded by Minoru Kiuchi |
| Preceded by Naoki Okada | Minister of State for "Cool Japan" Strategy; 2023–2024 | Succeeded by Minoru Kiuchi |
| Preceded by Shigeru Ishiba | Prime Minister of Japan; 2025–present | Incumbent |
Party political offices
| Preceded by Akira Amari | Chief of the Public Relations Headquarters, Liberal Democratic Party; 2012 | Succeeded by Yuriko Koike |
| Preceded by Akira Amari | Chairman of the Policy Research Council, Liberal Democratic Party; 2012–2014 | Succeeded by Tomomi Inada |
| Preceded by Hakubun Shimomura | Chairman of the Policy Research Council, Liberal Democratic Party; 2021–2022 | Succeeded by Koichi Hagiuda |
| Preceded by Shigeru Ishiba | President of the Liberal Democratic Party; 2025–present | Incumbent |
