= Kei Satō (politician) =

Japanese politician (born 1979)

- 佐藤 啓
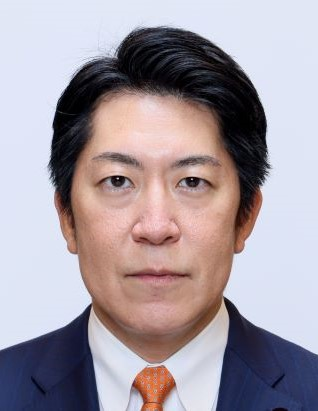
- Official portrait, 2025

Deputy Chief Cabinet Secretary (Political affairs, House of Councillors)
- In office 21 October 2025 – 17 September 2026
- Prime Minister: Sanae Takaichi
- Preceded by: Kazuhiko Aoki
- Succeeded by: Yūsuke Nakanishi

Member of the House of Councillors
- Incumbent
- Assumed office 26 July 2016
- Preceded by: Kiyoshige Maekawa
- Constituency: Nara at-large

Personal details
- Born: 4 July 1979 (age 47) Nara City, Nara, Japan
- Party: Liberal Democratic
- Education: University of Tokyo; Carnegie Mellon University; University of Southern California

Kei Satō (born 4 July 1979) is a Japanese politician who has served as a member of the House of Councillors since 2016, representing Nara Prefecture.

== Career ==
Satō was born on 4 July 1979 in Nara Prefecture. He graduated from the faculty of economics at the University of Tokyo in 2003, and later also obtained degrees from Carnegie Mellon University and USC Gould School of Law.

After his graduation, Satō joined the Ministry of Internal Affairs and Communications in 2003. In 2011, he moved to the municipal government of Hitachiōta, Ibaraki, becoming director general of the policy planning and later general affairs departments. In 2014, he became executive secretary to the special advisor of the Prime Minister. He was elected as a member of the House of Councillors representing Nara in 2016, winning 292,440 votes. He was appointed to the three senior roles of Parliamentary Vice-Minister of Economy, Trade and Industry (METI); Parliamentary Vice-Minister of Cabinet Office; and Parliamentary Vice-Minister for Reconstruction on September 18, 2020.

=== Assassination of Shinzo Abe ===
On 8 July 2022, former prime minister Shinzo Abe gave a speech in Nara supporting Satō's reelection campaign. During the speech, Abe was shot and killed by an assassin. The election took place two days later, with Satō winning his reelection bid. On 1 July the following year, Satō led the unveiling of Abe's memorial in Mikasa Cemetery.
