= Nara 1st district =

Japanese electoral district

- Parliamentary constituency for the House of Representatives
- Numbered map of Nara Prefecture single-member districts
- Electorate: 394,347 (as of September 1, 2022)

Current constituency
- Created: 1994
- Number of members: 1
- Party: LDP
- Representative: Shigeki Kobayashi

Nara 1st district (奈良[県第]1区 Nara[-ken dai-]ikku) is a single-member electoral district for the House of Representatives, the lower house of the National Diet of Japan, located in Nara Prefecture. The district consists of the city of Ikoma and the prefectural capital Nara City (without the former village of Tsuge that is in Nara 2nd district).

The district has been frequently represented by Sumio Mabuchi who was a minister of state in the Kan Cabinet in from 2010 to 2011.

== List of representatives ==
Representative	Party	Dates	Notes
Sanae Takaichi	NFP	1996 – 2000	Left NFP and joined LDP in 1996, re-elected in the Kinki proportional representation block
Masahiro Morioka	LDP	2000–2003	Re-elected by PR
Sumio Mabuchi	DPJ	2003 – 2016	
Sumio Mabuchi	DP	2016 – 2017	
Shigeki Kobayashi	LDP	2017 – 2021	Gained a seat in the PR block.
Sumio Mabuchi	CDP	2021 – 2026	
Shigeki Kobayashi	LDP	2026 –	

== Election results ==
2026
Party	Candidate	Votes	%	±%
LDP	Shigeki Kobayashi	131,313	53.3	▲21.7
Centrist Reform	Sumio Mabuchi (incumbent)	64,325	26.1	▼12.9
DPP	Aoi Sugimoto	29,976	12.2	
Sanseitō	Yōji Kurokawa	11,181	4.5	▼0.4
JCP	Kazuhiro Tanigawa	9,541	3.9	▼1.9
Registered electors		387,379		
Turnout			64.36	▲3.96
LDP gain from Centrist Reform				

2024
Party	Candidate	Votes	%	±%
CDP	Sumio Mabuchi	90,323	38.96	▼0.73
LDP (Komeito)	Shigeki Kobayashi (won a seat in Kinki PR block)	73,214	31.58	▼3.48
Ishin	Atsushi Takano	43,400	18.72	▼7.25
JCP	Yoshiko Inoue	13,511	5.83	New
Sanseitō	Masako Hayashimoto	11,366	4.90	New
Majority		17,109	7.38	▲3.47
Registered electors		390,044		
Turnout		231,814	60.40	▼0.90
CDP hold				

2021
Party	Candidate	Votes	%	±%
CDP	Sumio Mabuchi	93,050	39.0	▼0.7
LDP	Shigeki Kobayashi (won a seat in Kinki PR block)	83,718	35.1	▼5.7
Ishin	Kiyoshige Maekawa (won a seat in Kinki PR block)	62,000	26.0	▲16.3
Turnout		238,768	61.30	▲4.74
CDP gain from LDP				

2017
Party	Candidate	Votes	%	±%
LDP	Shigeki Kobayashi	90,558	40.8	▼0.4
Kibō no Tō	Sumio Mabuchi	88,082	39.7	▼8.7
JCP	Yoshiko Inoue	21,782	9.8	▼0.6
Ishin	Tadao Yoshino	21,484	9.7	New
Turnout		221,906	56.56	▼0.26
LDP gain from Kibō no Tō				

2014
Party	Candidate	Votes	%	±%
Democratic	Sumio Mabuchi	79,265	48.4	▲10.5
LDP	Shigeki Kobayashi	67,473	41.2	▲7.6
JCP	Kazuhiko Tanigawa	16,996	10.4	▲3.3
Turnout		163,734	56.82	▼6.03
Democratic hold				

2012
Party	Candidate	Votes	%	±%
Democratic (People's New)	Sumio Mabuchi	68,712	37.9	▼22.8
LDP (Kōmeitō)	Shigeki Kobayashi (won Kinki PR seat)	61,043	33.6	▲2.7
Restoration (Your)	Yūji Ōno	38,791	21.4	New
JCP	Emiko Itō	12,954	7.1	▼0.3
Turnout		181,500	62.85	▼5.53
Democratic hold				

2009
Party	Candidate	Votes	%	±%
Democratic	Sumio Mabuchi	120,812	60.7	▲13.5
LDP (Kōmeitō)	Masahiro Morioka	61,464	30.9	▼2.8
JCP	Yoshiko Inoue	14,732	7.4	▼0.3
Happiness Realization	Mayumi Kurioka	2,137	1.1	New
Turnout		202,354	68.38	▼0.16
Democratic hold				

2005
Party	Candidate	Votes	%	±%
Democratic	Sumio Mabuchi	73,062	37.2	▼11
LDP	Chubee Kagita (elected by PR)	66,215	33.7	▼6
Independent	Masahiro Morioka	41,914	21.4	New
JCP	Ayumi Hosono	15,071	7.7	▼4.4
Turnout		202,810	68.54	▼10.15
Democratic hold				

2003
Party	Candidate	Votes	%	±%
Democratic	Sumio Mabuchi	79,529	48.2	▲15.5
LDP	Sanae Takaichi	65,538	39.7	▼4.4
JCP	Masamichi Satō	20,010	12.1	▼7.2
Turnout		172,474	58.39	
Democratic gain from LDP				

2000
Party	Candidate	Votes	%	±%
LDP	Masahiro Morioka	73,851	44.1	▲13.4
Democratic	Sumio Mabuchi	54,684	32.7	▲21.1
JCP	Masamichi Satō	32,337	19.3	▼1.4
Liberal League	Hiroshi Mukai	6,401	3.8	New
Turnout				
LDP gain from New Frontier				

1996
Party	Candidate	Votes	%	±%
New Frontier	Sanae Takaichi	60,507	37.0	New
LDP	Masahiro Morioka	50,249	30.7	New
JCP	Daiichi Tsuji (elected by PR)	33,802	20.7	New
Democratic	Satoru Ienishi (elected by PR)	18,994	11.6	New
Turnout		166,087	59.03	
New Frontier win		Swing		
