= Makoto Taki =

Japanese politician (born 1938)

- 滝 実
- Official portrait, 2012

Minister of Justice
- In office 24 October 2012 – 26 December 2012
- Prime Minister: Yoshihiko Noda
- Preceded by: Keishu Tanaka
- Succeeded by: Sadakazu Tanigaki
- In office 4 June 2012 – 1 October 2012
- Prime Minister: Yoshihiko Noda
- Preceded by: Toshio Ogawa
- Succeeded by: Keishu Tanaka

Member of the House of Representatives
- In office 21 October 1996 – 16 November 2012
- Preceded by: Constituency established
- Succeeded by: Sanae Takaichi
- Constituency: Nara 2nd (1996–2003); Kinki PR (2003–2009); Nara 2nd (2009–2012)

Personal details
- Born: 15 September 1938 (age 88) Tokyo, Japan
- Party: Democratic
- Other political affiliations: LDP (1996–2005); NPN (2005–2007); Independent (2007–2009)
- Education: University of Tokyo

Makoto Taki (滝 実, Taki Makoto; born 15 September 1938) is a former Japanese politician who served in the House of Representatives in the Diet (national legislature). A native of Ōta, Tokyo and graduate of the University of Tokyo he was elected for the first time in 1996.

== Career ==
Taki was appointed as Minister of Justice under the second cabinet of prime minister Yoshihiko Noda on 4 June 2012. On 1 October 2012, he was replaced by Keishu Tanaka. After Tanaka was tainted by scandals relating to political donations and organized crime links, Taki was reappointed to the position on 24 October 2012. He left office on 26 December 2012.

House of Representatives (Japan)
New district	Member of the House of Representatives from Nara 2nd district 1996–2003	Succeeded by Tetsuji Nakamura
Preceded by 30-member district	Member of the House of Representatives from Kinki; 2003–2009	Succeeded by 29-member district
Preceded by Sanae Takaichi	Member of the House of Representatives from Nara 2nd district 2009–present	Incumbent
Preceded by Kozo Yamamoto	Chairperson of the House of Representatives Judiciary Committee; 2009–2010	Succeeded by Ken Okuda
Political offices
Preceded by Yukio Jitsukawa	Senior Vice Minister of Justice; 2004–2005	Succeeded by Shigeyuki Tomita
Preceded by Toshio Ogawa	Senior Vice Minister of Justice; 2011–2012	Succeeded by Hiroyuki Tani
Preceded by Toshio Ogawa	Minister of Justice; 4 June – 1 October 2012	Succeeded by Keishu Tanaka
Preceded by Keishu Tanaka	Minister of Justice; 24 October – 26 December 2012	Succeeded by Sadakazu Tanigaki
