= Sumio Mabuchi =

Japanese politician

- 馬淵 澄夫
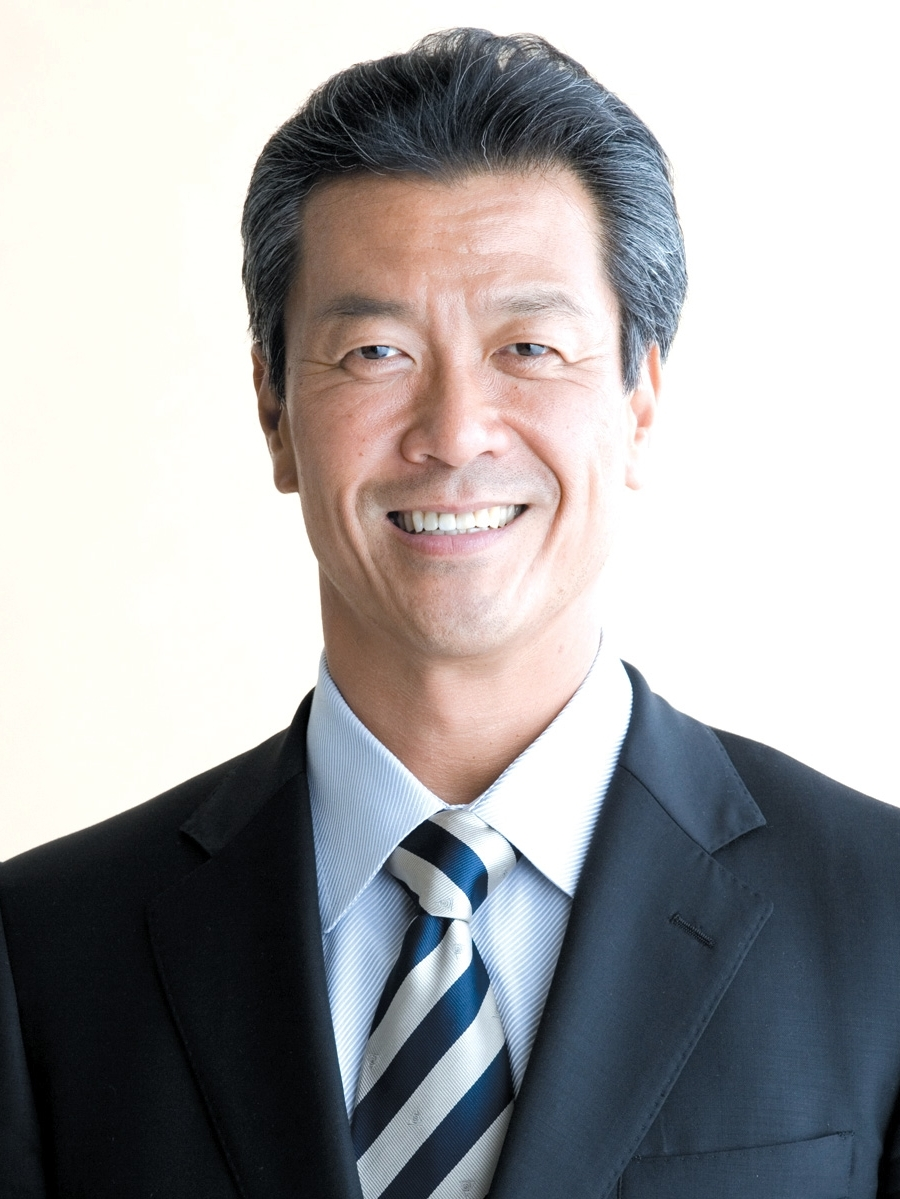
- Official portrait, 2010

Minister of Land, Infrastructure, Transport and Tourism
- In office 17 September 2010 – 14 January 2011
- Prime Minister: Naoto Kan
- Preceded by: Seiji Maehara
- Succeeded by: Akihiro Ohata

Member of the House of Representatives
- In office 5 February 2019 – 23 January 2026
- Preceded by: Shinji Tarutoko
- Succeeded by: Shigeki Kobayashi
- Constituency: Kinki PR (2019–2021); Nara 1st (2021–2026)
- In office 9 November 2003 – 28 September 2017
- Preceded by: Masahiro Morioka
- Succeeded by: Shigeki Kobayashi
- Constituency: Nara 1st

Personal details
- Born: 23 August 1960 (age 66) Nara, Japan
- Party: CRA (since 2026)
- Other political affiliations: DPJ (2000–2016); DP (2016–2017); KnT (2017–2018); Independent (2019–2020); CDP (2020–2026)
- Children: 6
- Education: Yokohama National University
- Website: Official website

Sumio Mabuchi (馬淵 澄夫, Mabuchi Sumio; born 23 August 1960) is a Japanese politician and a member of the House of Representatives in the Diet (national legislature).

== Early life and education ==
A native of Nara, Mabuchi was born on 23 August 1960. He holds a bachelor's degree in civil engineering, which he received from Yokohama National University in March 1984.

== Career ==
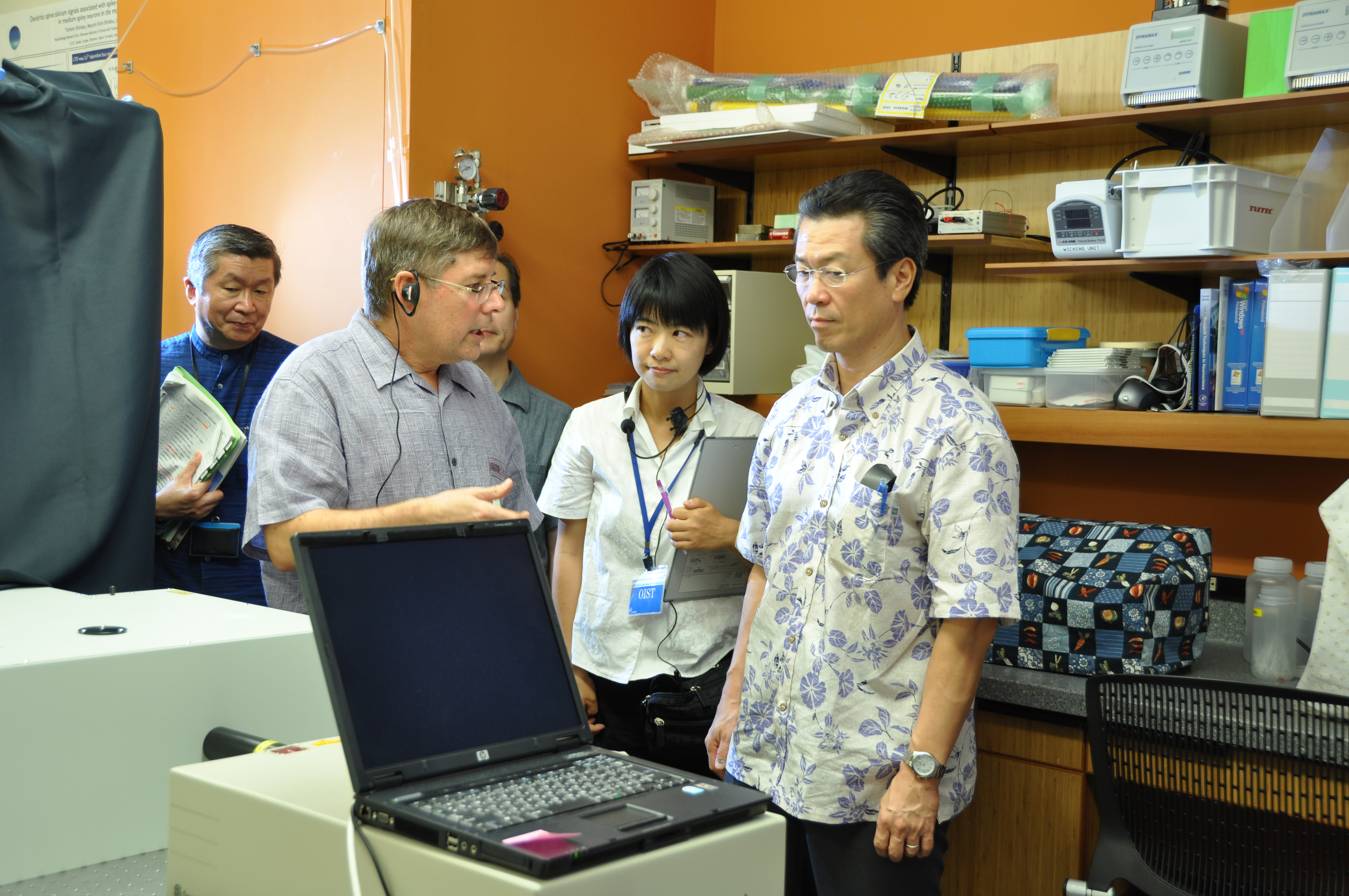
Mabuchi (right) visiting the Okinawa Institute of Science and Technology in 2010

Until 2000, Mabuchi worked in private sector and became director of the firm he was working for at age 32. He was elected to the House of Representatives for the first time in 2003 after an unsuccessful run in 2000. He was appointed senior vice minister of land, infrastructure, transport and tourism in September 2009.

On 17 September 2010, Mabuchi was named as the new minister of land, infrastructure, transport and tourism in the reshuffled Naoto Kan cabinet. Mabuchi left prime minister Kan's cabinet on 14 January 2011, after the then-opposition Liberal Democratic Party (LDP) passed a censure motion against him following the leaking of Japanese Coast Guard footage of the 2010 Senkaku boat collision incident. and ran unsuccessfully to replace him in the DPJ presidential election after Kan stepped down, losing to Yoshihiko Noda, who replaced Kan as Prime Minister. After the Democratic Party of Japan suffered a major defeat to the LDP under Noda at 2012 Japanese general election. Noda resigned to accept responsibility for the defeat.

The resulting DPJ presidential election was held on 25 December 2012, which was contested by Mabuchi and Banri Kaieda. It was won by Kaieda with 90 votes to Mabuchi's 54 votes.

Mabuchi continued to hold his seat until he was narrowly defeated in the 2017 general election. He had the highest ratio of margin of defeat (sekihairitsu) (97.27%) among all defeated candidates in the election. Mabuchi returned to the House in February 2019 after the resignation of Shinji Tarutoko, who was contesting the Osaka 12th district by-election. Being the candidate with the next largest sekihairitsu in Kibō no Tō's 2017 Kinki proportional representation list, Mabuchi was next in line to fill Tarutoko's PR seat. Mabuchi chose to sit as an independent.

== Nickname ==
Mabuchi is a bodybuilder, and has been nicknamed "The Terminator". On the other hand, he calls himself "lone gorilla".

== Personal life ==
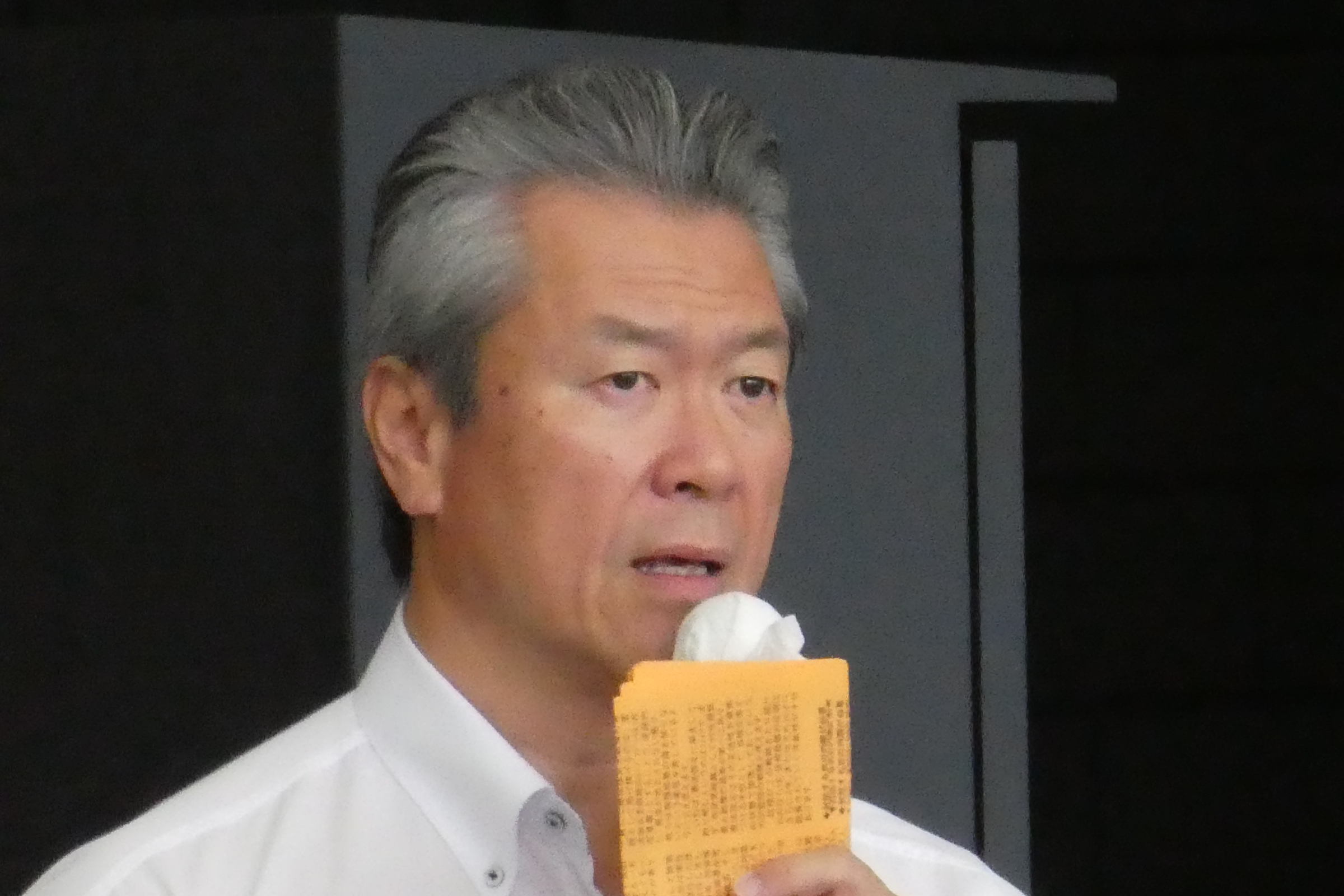
Mabuchi in 2019

Mabuchi is married and has six children, five of whom are girls. His spare-time activities include surfing and cooking.

Political offices
Preceded by Seiji Maehara	Minister of Land, Infrastructure, Transport and Tourism; 2010–2011	Succeeded by Akihiro Ōhata
Preceded by Seiji Maehara	Minister of State for Okinawa and Northern Territories Affairs; 2010–2011	Succeeded by Yukio Edano
Preceded by Yasushi Kaneko; Tokio Kanō	Senior Vice Minister of Land, Infrastructure, Transport and Tourism; 2009–2010; Served alongside: Kiyomi Tsujimoto→Taizō Mikazuki	Succeeded by Wakio Mitsui; Shūji Ikeguchi
House of Representatives (Japan)
Preceded by Masahiro Morioka	Representative for Nara 1st district 2003–2017	Succeeded by Shigeki Kobayashi
Preceded by 28-member district (seat vacated by Shinji Tarutoko)	Representative for Kinki proportional representation block 2019–	Incumbent
