= Kanagawa 5th district =

- Parliamentary constituency for the Japanese House of Representatives
- Numbered map of the Kanagawa Prefecture single seats in Yokohama
- Prefecture: Kanagawa
- Proportional District: Southern Kanto
- Electorate: 363,392

Current constituency
- Created: 1994
- Seats: One
- Party: LDP
- Representatives: Manabu Sakai
- Municipalities: Izumi-ku and Totsuka-ku of Yokohama

Kanagawa 5th district (神奈川県第5区, Kanagawa-ken dai-goku or simply 神奈川5区, Kanagawa-goku) is a single-member constituency of the House of Representatives in the national Diet of Japan located in Kanagawa Prefecture.

== Areas covered ==
=== Since 2022 ===
- Yokohama
  - Izumi-ku
  - Totsuka-ku

=== 1994 - 2022 ===
- Yokohama
  - Izumi-ku
  - Seya-ku
  - Totsuka-ku

== List of representatives ==
Election	Representative	Party	Notes
1996	Keishu Tanaka	New Frontier	
1996	Keishu Tanaka	New Fraternity	
2000	Keishu Tanaka	Democratic	
2003	Keishu Tanaka	Democratic	
2005	Manabu Sakai	LDP	
2009	Keishu Tanaka	Democratic	
2012	Manabu Sakai	LDP	
2014	Manabu Sakai	LDP	
2017	Manabu Sakai	LDP	
2021	Manabu Sakai	LDP	
2024	Manabu Sakai	LDP	
2026	Manabu Sakai	LDP	

== Election results ==
=== 2026 ===
2026
Party	Candidate	Votes	%	±%
LDP	Manabu Sakai (Incumbent)	99,726	49.7	▲8.95
Centrist Reform	Makoto Yamazaki	53,593	26.7	▼7.42
Ishin	Kunie Kusaka	34,078	17	▼0.14
JCP	Michiko Takamiya	13,234	7.99 6.6	▼1.39
Majority		46,133	23	▲16.37
Registered electors		362,706		
Turnout		200,631	56.94	▲0.71
LDP hold				

=== 2024 ===
2024
Party	Candidate	Votes	%	±%
LDP	Manabu Sakai (Incumbent)	80,495	40.75	▼12.72
CDP	Makoto Yamazaki (Won PR seat)	67,399	34.12	▼12.41
Ishin	Kunie Kusaka	33,863	17.14	New
JCP	Michiko Takamiya	15,794	7.99	N/A
Majority		13,096	6.63	
Registered electors		362,692		
Turnout			56.23	▲0.18
LDP hold				

=== 2021 ===
2021
Party	Candidate	Votes	%	±%
LDP	Manabu Sakai (Incumbent)	136,288	53.47	▲1.86
CDP	Makoto Yamazaki (Won PR seat)	118,619	46.53	New
Majority		17,669	6.94	
Registered electors		467,198		
Turnout			56.05	▲4.08
LDP hold				

=== 2017 ===
2017
Party	Candidate	Votes	%	±%
LDP	Manabu Sakai (Incumbent)	120,068	51.61	▲3.85
Kibō no Tō	Kenji Yoshioka	67,085	28.84	New
JCP	Seigo Yokoyama	45,497	19.56	▲6.00
Majority		52,983	22.77	
Registered electors		462,505		
Turnout			51.97	▼2.31
LDP hold				

=== 2014 ===
2014
Party	Candidate	Votes	%	±%
LDP	Manabu Sakai (Incumbent)	112,963	47.76	▲7.00
Innovation	Masashi Mito (Won PR seat)	56,647	23.95	New
JCP	Seigo Yokoyama	32,075	13.56	▲6.18
Independent	Yayoi Gotoda	27,188	11.49	New
Future Generations	Toshihisa Kono	7,656	3.24	New
Majority		56,316	23.81	
Registered electors		450,157		
Turnout			54.28	▼6.61
LDP hold				

=== 2012 ===
2012
Party	Candidate	Votes	%	±%
LDP	Manabu Sakai	107,796	40.76	▲2.81
Restoration	Daichi Yuzawa	46,632	17.63	New
Your	Toichiro Ikeda	43,786	16.56	New
Democratic	Keishu Tanaka (Incumbent)	30,494	11.53	▼39.41
JCP	Seigo Yokoyama	19,512	7.38	▼2.28
Tomorrow	Toshihisa Kono	16,268	6.14	New
Majority		61,164	23.13	
Registered electors				
Turnout			60.89	▼9.24
LDP gain from Democratic				

=== 2009 ===
2009
Party	Candidate	Votes	%	±%
Democratic	Keishu Tanaka	156,328	50.94	▲12.26
LDP	Manabu Sakai (Incumbent)	116,468	37.95	▼13.13
JCP	Hiroshi Iwasaki	29,657	9.66	▼0.58
Happiness Realization	Takashi Kadomori	4,448	1.45	New
Majority		39,860	12.99	
Registered electors				
Turnout			70.13	
Democratic gain from LDP				

=== 2005 ===
2005
Party	Candidate	Votes	%	±%
LDP	Manabu Sakai	151,617	51.08	▲13.91
Democratic	Keishu Tanaka (Incumbent)	114,816	38.68	▼11.65
JCP	Takeshi Ōmori	30,407	10.24	▼2.26
Majority		36,801	12.40	
Registered electors				
Turnout				
LDP gain from Democratic				

=== 2003 ===
2003
Party	Candidate	Votes	%	±%
Democratic	Keishu Tanaka (Incumbent)	123,905	50.33	▼1.60
LDP	Manabu Sakai	91,513	37.17	▲8.63
JCP	Takeshi Ōmori	30,770	12.50	▼7.03
Majority		32,392	13.16	
Registered electors				
Turnout				
Democratic hold				

=== 2000 ===
2000
Party	Candidate	Votes	%	±%
Democratic	Keishu Tanaka (Incumbent)	128,010	51.93	New
LDP	Issei Suzuki	70,343	28.54	▲2.63
JCP	Takeshi Ōmori (Won PR seat)	48,146	19.53	▲3.08
Majority		57,667	23.39	
Registered electors				
Turnout				
Democratic hold				

=== 1996 ===
1996
Party	Candidate	Votes	%	±%
New Frontier	Keishu Tanaka	81,289	35.86	New
LDP	Issei Suzuki	58,732	25.91	New
Democratic	Osamu Asari	49,369	21.78	New
JCP	Takeshi Ōmori (Won PR seat)	37,263	16.45	New
Majority		22,557	9.95	
Registered electors				
Turnout				
New Frontier win (new seat)				
