= Tetsuji Nakamura =

Japanese politician

- 中村 哲治
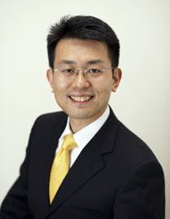
- Official portrait, 2009

Member of the House of Councillors
- In office 29 July 2007 – 4 December 2012
- Preceded by: Shōgo Arai
- Succeeded by: Iwao Horii
- Constituency: Nara at-large

Member of the House of Representatives
- In office 25 June 2000 – 11 September 2005
- Preceded by: Multi-member district
- Succeeded by: Sanae Takaichi
- Constituency: Kinki PR (2000–2003); Nara 2nd (2003–2005)

Personal details
- Born: 24 July 1971 (age 55) Ikoma, Nara, Japan
- Party: Democratic (2000–2012)
- Other political affiliations: PLF (2012); TPJ (2012–2013); PLP (2013–2015); Independent (2015–2016); DP (2016–2018)
- Education: Kyoto University

Tetsuji Nakamura (中村 哲治, Nakamura Tetsuji; born 24 July 1971) is a former Japanese politician of the Democratic Party of Japan, who served as a member of the House of Representatives and the House of Councillors in the Diet (national legislature).

== Career ==
A native of Ikoma, Nara and graduate of Kyoto University, he was a member of the House of Representatives for the Nara 2nd district, but lost re-election in 2005. He was elected to the House of Councillors for the Nara at-large district in 2007. In 2012 Nakamura resigned to attempt to retake his seat in the 2nd district in the 2012 Japanese general election but he was unsuccessful.
