= Keishu Tanaka =

Japanese politician (1938–2022)

- 田中 慶秋
- Official portrait, 2012

Minister of Justice
- In office 1 October 2012 – 24 October 2012
- Prime Minister: Yoshihiko Noda
- Preceded by: Makoto Taki
- Succeeded by: Makoto Taki

Member of the House of Representatives
- In office 30 August 2009 – 16 November 2012
- Preceded by: Manabu Sakai
- Succeeded by: Manabu Sakai
- Constituency: Kanagawa 5th
- In office 20 October 1996 – 8 August 2005
- Preceded by: Constituency established
- Succeeded by: Manabu Sakai
- Constituency: Kanagawa 5th
- In office 18 December 1983 – 24 January 1990
- Preceded by: Takamochi Takahashi
- Succeeded by: Motohisa Ikeda
- Constituency: Kanagawa 4th

Member of the Kanagawa Prefectural Assembly
- In office 1971–1983

Personal details
- Born: 6 March 1938 Sōma, Fukushima, Japan
- Died: 4 January 2022 (aged 83) Yokohama, Kanagawa, Japan
- Party: Democratic
- Other political affiliations: DSP (1983–1994); New Frontier (1994–1998); New Fraternity (1998)
- Education: Tokai University

Keishu Tanaka (田中 慶秋, Tanaka Keishū; 6 March 1938 – 4 January 2022) was a Japanese politician, who served in the House of Representatives in the Diet (national legislature) as a member of the Democratic Party. He was Minister of Justice under Prime Minister Yoshihiko Noda from 1 to 23 October 2012 before resigning due to scandals over financial donations and links to organized crime.

== Early life and political career ==
Tanaka was a native of Sōma District, Fukushima. He graduated from Tokai University.

He was elected for the first time in 1983.

== As a cabinet minister ==
On 1 October 2012, Prime Minister Yoshihiko Noda in his third cabinet lineup, appointed Tanaka as Minister of Justice to succeed Makoto Taki. He also became Minister for the Abduction Issue succeeding Jin Matsubara.

=== Taiwanese donations ===
On 4 October 2012, Tanaka said that a local branch of the DPJ he heads in Kanagawa prefecture had received 420,000 yen in donations from 2006 to 2009 from a company run by Taiwanese. The money was returned on 3 October 2012, two days after he became Minister of Justice. Under the Political Funds Control Act of 1948, politicians are banned from receiving donations from foreign individuals and organizations composed mostly of foreign citizens. The possible punishments are prison terms of up to three years, or fines of up to 500,000 yen. At a 4 October 2012 press conference he said that he was not considering resigning.

=== Yakuza connections ===
On 11 October 2012, the weekly magazine Shūkan Shinchō reported that 30 years ago Tanaka had connections to a group affiliated to the Inagawa-kai yakuza syndicate, that he had made an appearance and made a speech at a party hosted by a yakuza boss, and that he had also acted as a matchmaker for an executive member of the group. He said that he would not have taken the actions if he had been aware of the yakuza connections. He denied using yakuza to pursue his own interests or to mediate their disputes.

=== Resignation ===
The opposition had demanded that he explain his actions to an upper house panel on 18 October 2012. Tanaka's schedule became full and he could not appear. The following day, on 19 October 2012 he entered hospital complaining of ill health. He was checked into Tokai University Tokyo Hospital complaining of chest pains. It was widely expected that he would either tender his resignation or that he would be sacked as a minister. He resigned on 23 October 2012, citing health reasons. He was succeeded by Makoto Taki, who had also been his predecessor in the role.

== Personal life and death ==
Tanaka died on 4 January 2022, at the age of 83.

Political offices
Preceded by Makoto Taki	Minister of Justice; 1 – 24 October 2012	Succeeded by Makoto Taki
