= Iwao Horii =

Japanese politician (born 1965)

- 堀井 巌
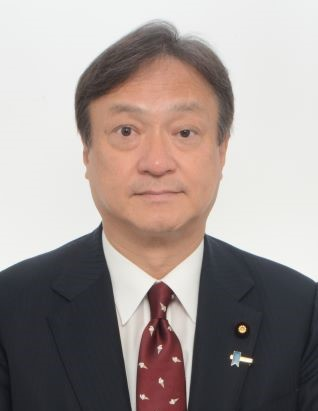
- Official portrait, 2025

Member of the House of Councillors
- Incumbent
- Assumed office 29 July 2013
- Preceded by: Tetsuji Nakamura
- Constituency: Nara at-large

Personal details
- Born: 22 October 1965 (age 60) Kashihara, Nara, Japan
- Party: Liberal Democratic
- Education: University of Tokyo

Iwao Horii is a Japanese politician who is a member of the House of Councillors of Japan.

== Career ==
In 1988, he graduated from the University of Tokyo and joined Ministry of Home Affairs. He served as Vice Minister of Foreign Affairs in 2023. He visited the Marshall Islands in 2018.
