= Shōgo Arai =

Japanese politician

- 荒井 正吾

Governor of Nara Prefecture
- In office 3 May 2007 – 2 May 2023
- Monarchs: Akihito; Naruhito
- Preceded by: Yoshiya Kakimoto
- Succeeded by: Makoto Yamashita

Member of the House of Councillors
- In office 29 July 2001 – 9 March 2007
- Preceded by: Yukihisa Yoshida
- Succeeded by: Tetsuji Nakamura
- Constituency: Nara at-large

Personal details
- Born: 18 January 1945 (age 81) Yao, Osaka, Japan
- Party: Liberal Democratic
- Education: University of Tokyo; Syracuse University

Shōgo Arai (荒井 正吾, Arai Shōgo; born 18 January 1945 in Yao, Osaka) is a Japanese politician and a former governor of Nara Prefecture in Japan.

== Early life ==
Arai was born in Yao Osaka in 1945. He is a graduate of the University of Tokyo, and joined the Ministry of Transport after graduation. He attended the Maxwell School of Citizenship and Public Affairs Syracuse University as a ministry official.

== Political career ==
Leaving the ministry in 2001, he was elected to the House of Councillors in the Diet of Japan (national legislature) for the first time in the same year. He served in that body until 2007, when he was elected Governor of Nara Prefecture.

Arai served as Nara’s Governor from 2007 until 2023 when he was succeeded by Makoto Yamashita.
