= Manabu Sakai =

Japanese politician

- 坂井 学
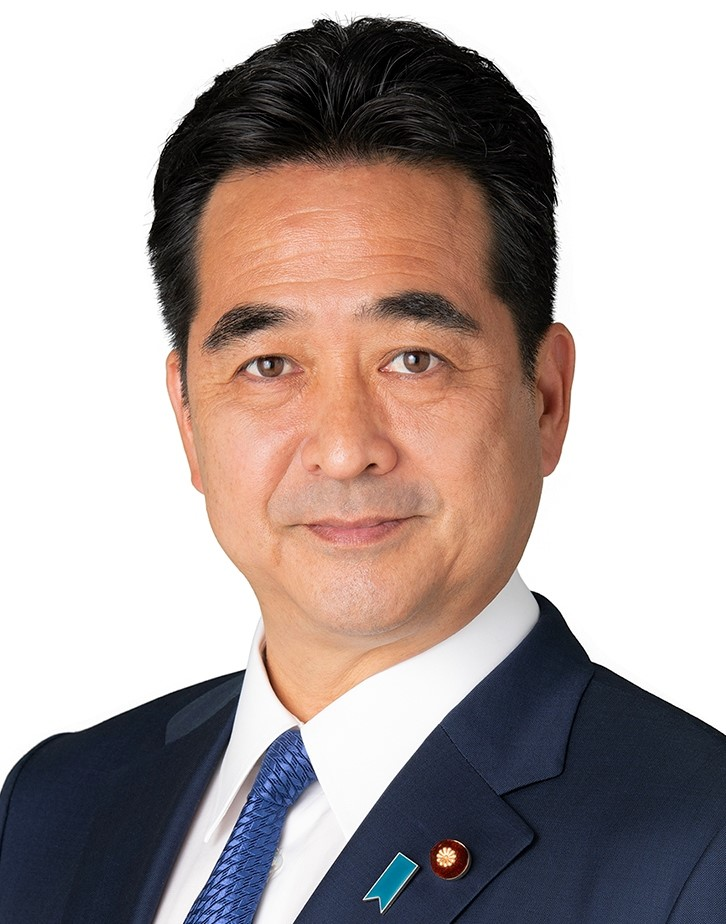
- Official portrait, 2021

Chairman of the National Public Safety Commission
- In office 1 October 2024 – 21 October 2025
- Prime Minister: Shigeru Ishiba
- Preceded by: Yoshifumi Matsumura
- Succeeded by: Jiro Akama

Deputy Chief Cabinet Secretary (Political affairs, House of Representatives)
- In office 16 September 2020 – 4 October 2021
- Prime Minister: Yoshihide Suga
- Preceded by: Akihiro Nishimura
- Succeeded by: Seiji Kihara

Member of the House of Representatives
- Incumbent
- Assumed office 19 December 2012
- Preceded by: Keishu Tanaka
- Constituency: Kanagawa 5th
- In office 11 September 2005 – 21 July 2009
- Preceded by: Keishu Tanaka
- Succeeded by: Keishu Tanaka
- Constituency: Kanagawa 5th

Personal details
- Born: 4 September 1965 (age 61) Fuchū, Tokyo, Japan
- Party: Liberal Democratic
- Education: University of Tokyo

Manabu Sakai (坂井 学, Sakai Manabu; born 4 September 1965) is a Japanese politician of the Liberal Democratic Party, a member of the House of Representatives in the Diet (national legislature). A native of Fuchū, Tokyo and graduate of the University of Tokyo, he was elected for the first time in 2005. He served as the Deputy Chief Cabinet Secretary for Political affairs from 2020 to 2021.
