= Nara 2nd district =

Japanese electoral district

- Parliamentary constituency for the House of Representatives
- Numbered map of Nara Prefecture single-member districts
- Electorate: 382,819 (as of September 1, 2022)

Current constituency
- Created: 1994
- Number of members: 1
- Party: LDP
- Representative: Sanae Takaichi

Nara 2nd district (Japanese: 奈良2区, Hepburn: Nara ni-ku), more formally 奈良県第2区 (Nara-ken dai-ni-ku) is a single-member electoral district in Nara Prefecture that was created in 1994. It has been represented in the House of Representatives, the lower house of the National Diet of Japan since 2012 by Sanae Takaichi, the Prime Minister and President of the Liberal Democratic Party since 2025.

After the introduction of first-past-the-post single-member districts, Nara 2nd district was first represented by Liberal Democratic newcomer Makoto Taki. In 2003, he lost the district to Democrat Tetsuji Nakamura, but won a seat in the Kinki proportional representation block. Taki was a postal privatization rebel in 2005 and joined the New Party Nippon ("New Party Japan"). The 2nd district went to Liberal Democrat Sanae Takaichi who had been a member of the House of Representatives from 1993 to 2003 (Nara At-large district as an independent in 1993, Nara 1st district for the New Frontier Party in 1996, Kinki PR block for the LDP in 2000). Taki only finished third, but again won a proportional seat – the only one of New Party Nippon's three seats in the country the party could hold. In 2009, Taki joined the Democratic Party and narrowly regained the 2nd district for the Democrats. Takaichi who had been a minister in the Abe cabinet remained Representative via the Kinki PR block. In 2012, Taki retired and Takaichi easily retook the district.

== Area ==
After redistricting in 2017, the district covers the following:

- Yamatokōriyama
- Tenri
- Kashiba
- Yamabe District
- Ikoma District
- Shiki District
- Former village of Tsuge (now a part of Nara City)

== List of representatives ==
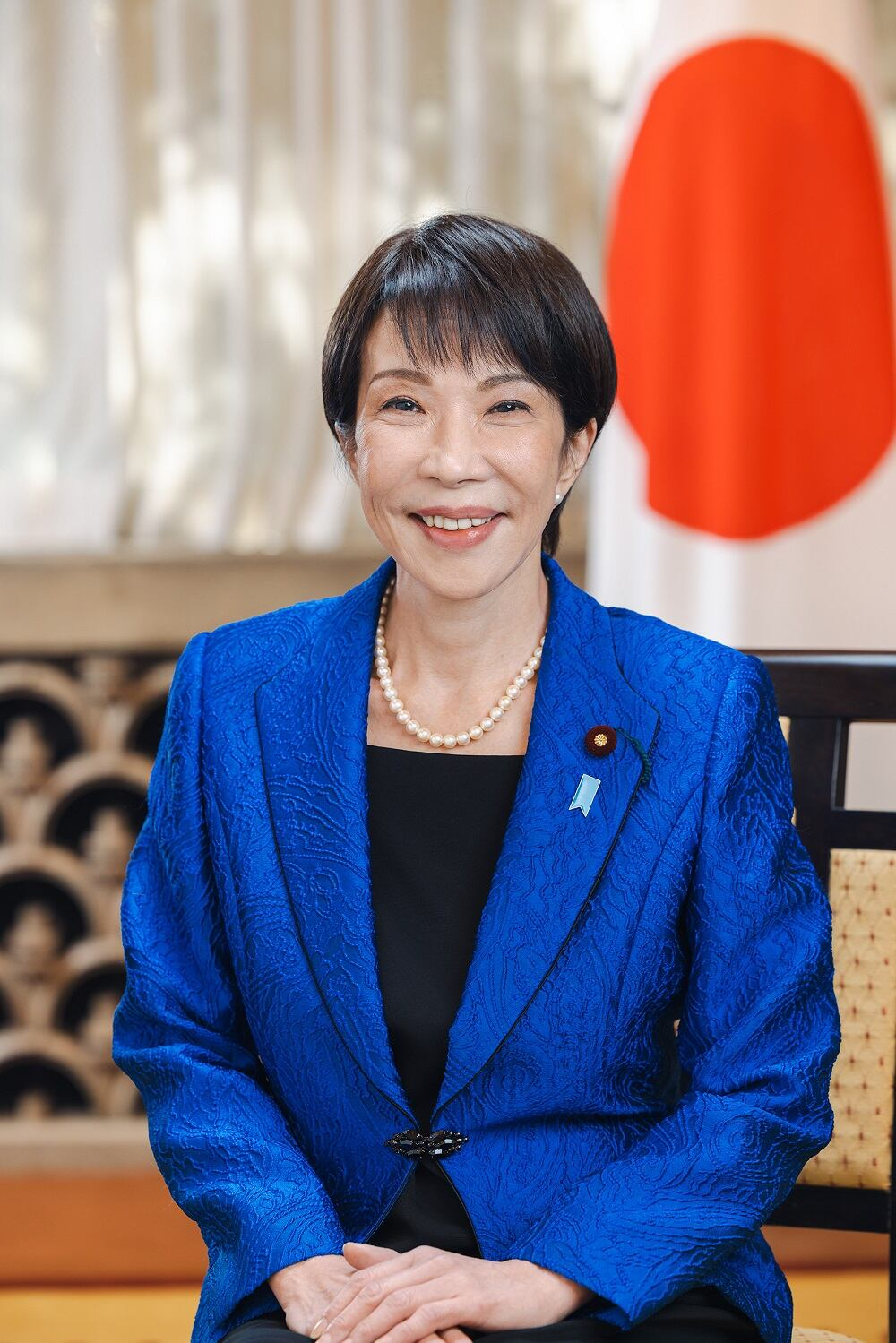
Sanae Takaichi has represented the constituency since 2012.

Election	Representative	Party	Notes
1996	Makoto Taki	LDP	Re-elected in the Kinki PR block
2003	Tetsuji Nakamura	DPJ	Failing re-election by PR
2005	Sanae Takaichi	LDP	Minister of State for Okinawa and Northern Territories Affairs (2006–2007); Minister of State for Science and Technology Policy (2006–2007); Minister of State for Science and Technology Policy (2006–2007); Minister of State for Gender Equality and Social Affairs (2006–2007); Minister of State for Food Safety (2006–2007); Minister of State for Innovation (2006–2007); Re-elected by PR
2009	Makoto Taki	DPJ	Minister of Justice (2012); Retired
2012	Sanae Takaichi	LDP	Minister for Internal Affairs and Communications (2014–2017 and 2019–2020); Minister of State for Economic Security (2022–2024); President of the Liberal Democratic Party (2025–present); Prime Minister of Japan (2025–present)

== Election results ==
2026
Party	Candidate	Votes	%	±%
LDP	Sanae Takaichi	193,708	87.0	▲26.81
JCP	Eiko Ikeda	28,921	13.0	▲6.3
Registered electors		373,535		
Turnout		222,629	62.40	▲4.53
LDP hold				

2024
Party	Candidate	Votes	%	±%
LDP	Sanae Takaichi	128,554	60.19	▼4.41
CDP	Mitsunori Ozaki	36,371	17.03	▼7.72
Ishin	Hattori Chika	34,354	16.08	New
JCP	Eiko Ikeda	14,313	6.70	▼3.91
Turnout		213,592	57.87	▼0.82
LDP hold				

2021
Party	Candidate	Votes	%	±%
LDP	Sanae Takaichi	141,858	64.6	▲4.5
CDP	Misato Ioku	54,326	24.8	New
JCP	Jirō Miyamoto	23,285	10.6	▼4.1
Turnout			58.69	▲3.80
LDP hold				

2017
Party	Candidate	Votes	%	±%
LDP	Sanae Takaichi	124,508	60.1	▼2.1
Kibō no Tō	Masayuki Matsumoto	52,384	25.3	New
JCP	Junichi Shimotori	21,937	14.7	▲0.7
Turnout			54.89	▼0.51
LDP hold				

2014
Party	Candidate	Votes	%	±%
LDP	Sanae Takaichi	96,218	61.3	▲14.6
People's Life	Tetsuji Nakamura	38,781	24.7	New
JCP	Nobutake Izumi	21,937	14.0	▲7.3
Turnout			55.40	▼8.50
LDP hold				

2012
Party	Candidate	Votes	%	±%
LDP (Kōmeitō)	Sanae Takaichi	86,747	46.7	▲2
Restoration (Your)	Ken Namikawa	45,014	24.2	New
Democratic (People's New)	Takeru Hyakutake	22,321	12.0	▼34.5
Tomorrow (NP-Daichi)	Tetsuji Nakamura	19,200	10.3	New
JCP	Akemi Nakano	12,444	6.7	▼0.7
Turnout			63.9	▼8.7
LDP gain from Democratic				

2009
Party	Candidate	Votes	%	±%
Democratic (People's New)	Makoto Taki	98,728	46.5	▲11.7
LDP (Kōmeitō)	Sanae Takaichi (elected by PR)	94,879	44.7	▲0.2
JCP	Fumiko Nishi	15,626	7.4	▲1.3
Happiness Realization	Takako Tanaka	2,971	1.4	New
Turnout		216,526	72.6	▲1.57
Democratic gain from LDP				

2005
Party	Candidate	Votes	%	±%
LDP	Sanae Takaichi	92,096	44.5	▲1.6
Democratic	Tetsuji Nakamura	72,074	34.8	▼13.6
NP-Nippon	Makoto Taki (elected by PR)	29,995	14.5	New
JCP	Akemi Nakano	12,657	6.1	▼2.7
Turnout		211,226	71.03	▲10.72
LDP gain from Democratic				

2003
Party	Candidate	Votes	%	±%
Democratic	Tetsuji Nakamura	83,168	48.4	
LDP	Makoto Taki (elected by PR)	73,646	42.9	
JCP	Jirō Miyamoto	15,044	8.8	
Turnout		178,668	60.31	
