= Kiyoshige Maekawa =

Japanese politician

- 前川 清成
- Official portrait, 2012

Member of the House of Representatives
- In office 5 November 2021 – 4 October 2023
- Preceded by: Multi-member district
- Succeeded by: Hideki Nakajima
- Constituency: Kinki PR

Member of the House of Councilors
- In office 26 July 2004 – 25 July 2016
- Preceded by: Minao Hattori
- Succeeded by: Kei Satō
- Constituency: Nara at-large

Personal details
- Born: 22 December 1962 (age 63) Kashihara, Nara, Japan
- Party: Innovation (since 2020)
- Other political affiliations: DPJ (2004–2016); DP (2016–2017); Kibō no Tō (2017–2018); Independent (2018–2020)
- Education: Kansai University

Kiyoshige Maekawa (前川 清成, Maekawa Kiyoshige; born December 22, 1962) is a Japanese politician and a former member of both the House of Representatives and House of Councillors in the Diet. He joined the Japan Innovation Party in 2020, but had previously been a member of the Democratic Party of Japan.

== Career ==
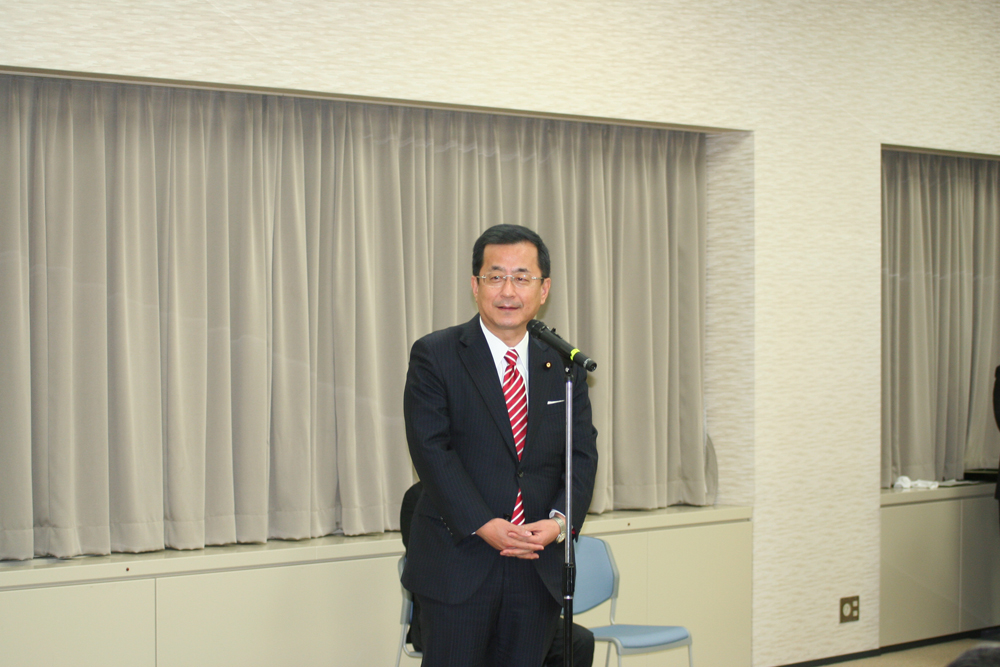
Kiyoshige Maekawa (in Tōkyō Metropolis on November 5, 2012)

A native of Kashihara, Nara and graduate of Kansai University, he was elected for the first time in 2004.
