= Masahiro Morioka (politician) =

Japanese politician

- 森岡 正宏
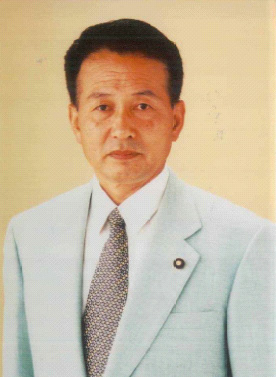
- Official portrait, c. 2004

Member of the House of Representatives
- In office 25 June 2000 – 10 October 2005
- Preceded by: Sanae Takaichi
- Succeeded by: Multi-member district
- Constituency: Nara 1st (2000–2003); Kinki PR (2003–2005)

Personal details
- Born: 29 January 1943 (age 83) Nara, Japan
- Party: Liberal Democratic
- Education: Doshisha University

Masahiro Morioka (森岡 正宏, Morioka Masahiro) is a former Japanese politician who served in the House of Representatives as a member of the Liberal Democratic Party. He was the secretary for the Ministry of Health, Labour, and Welfare. He claimed that family is the foundation of securing the nation of Japan. He disputed the legitimacy of the International Military Tribunal for the Far East, saying that the tribunal helped place a masochistic view of history in the Japanese people's minds.
