= Nara Prefectural Assembly =

Prefectural parliament of Nara, Japan

The Nara Prefectural Assembly (奈良県議会, Nara-ken Gikai) is the prefectural parliament of Nara Prefecture.

== Members ==
As of 19 October 2019

Constituency	Members	Party
Nara and Yamabe	Takeo Deguchi	LDP
Nara and Yamabe	Norihisa Ikeda	LDP
Nara and Yamabe	Misato Ioku	Shinsei Nara
Nara and Yamabe	Teruyo Kobayashi	JCP
Nara and Yamabe	Takashi Nakagawa	Nippon Ishin no Kai
Nara and Yamabe	Yoshio Ogita	LDP Nara
Nara and Yamabe	Masahiro Ōkuni	NKP
Nara and Yamabe	Takumi Tajiri	Shinsei Nara
Nara and Yamabe	Yoshifumi Uemura	LDP
Nara and Yamabe	Sachiho Yamamura	JCP
Nara and Yamabe	Masutoshi Yamanaka	NKP
Yamatokōriyama	Yoshitsugu Fujino	Shinsei Nara
Yamatokōriyama	Yonezō Koizumi	LDP Nara
Yamatokōriyama	Masafumi Nakano	LDP
Yamatotakada	Atsushi Ōta	JCP
Yamatotakada	Tadanori Yoneda	LDP
Tenri	Kunio Iwata	LDP Nara
Tenri	Nobuyoshi Kawaguchi	LDP Kizuna
Kashihara and Takaichi	Yoshiaki Kikkō	NKP
Kashihara and Takaichi	Yoshifumi Moriyama	Shinsei Nara
Kashihara and Takaichi	Vacant	Vacant
Kashihara and Takaichi	Nobuaki Yamamoto	Sōsei Nara
Sakurai	Akira Nakamura	LDP Nara
Sakurai	Keiji Wada	Sōsei Nara
Gojō	Toshitsugu Akimoto	LDP Nara
Gose	Shōji Kawaguchi	Sōsei Nara
Ikoma-shi	Higuchi Kiyohito	LDP
Ikoma-shi	Tamotsu Sakaguchi	Sōsei Nara
Ikoma-shi	Mitsunori Satō	Nippon Ishin no Kai
Ikoma-shi	Tamoshi Tsubutani	LDP Nara
Katsuragi	Nishikawa Hitoshi	LDP Nara
Kashiba	Hiroyasu Okuyama	LDP Nara
Kashiba	Mitsunori Osaki	Shinsei Nara
Uda and Uda	Tadamitsu Tanaka	LDP
Ikoma-gun	Makoto Kobayashi	Nippon Ishin no Kai
Ikoma-gun	Naoki Komura	LDP
Shiki	Masanori Ioka	LDP
Shiki	Munehiro Matsumoto	LDP Kizuna
Kitakatsuragi	Mitsuko Imai	Nippon Ishin no Kai
Kitakatsuragi	Hiroyuki Inui	LDP Nara
Kitakatsuragi	Tsutomu Shimizu	JCP
Yoshino	Kenji Kuninaka	LDP
Yoshino	Atsushi Uranishi	Sōsei Nara
