= Law Concerning the Punishment of Damage to the National Flag =

Japanese law ratified in 2026

Law Concerning the Punishment of Damage to the National Flag 国旗の損壊等の処罰に関する法律
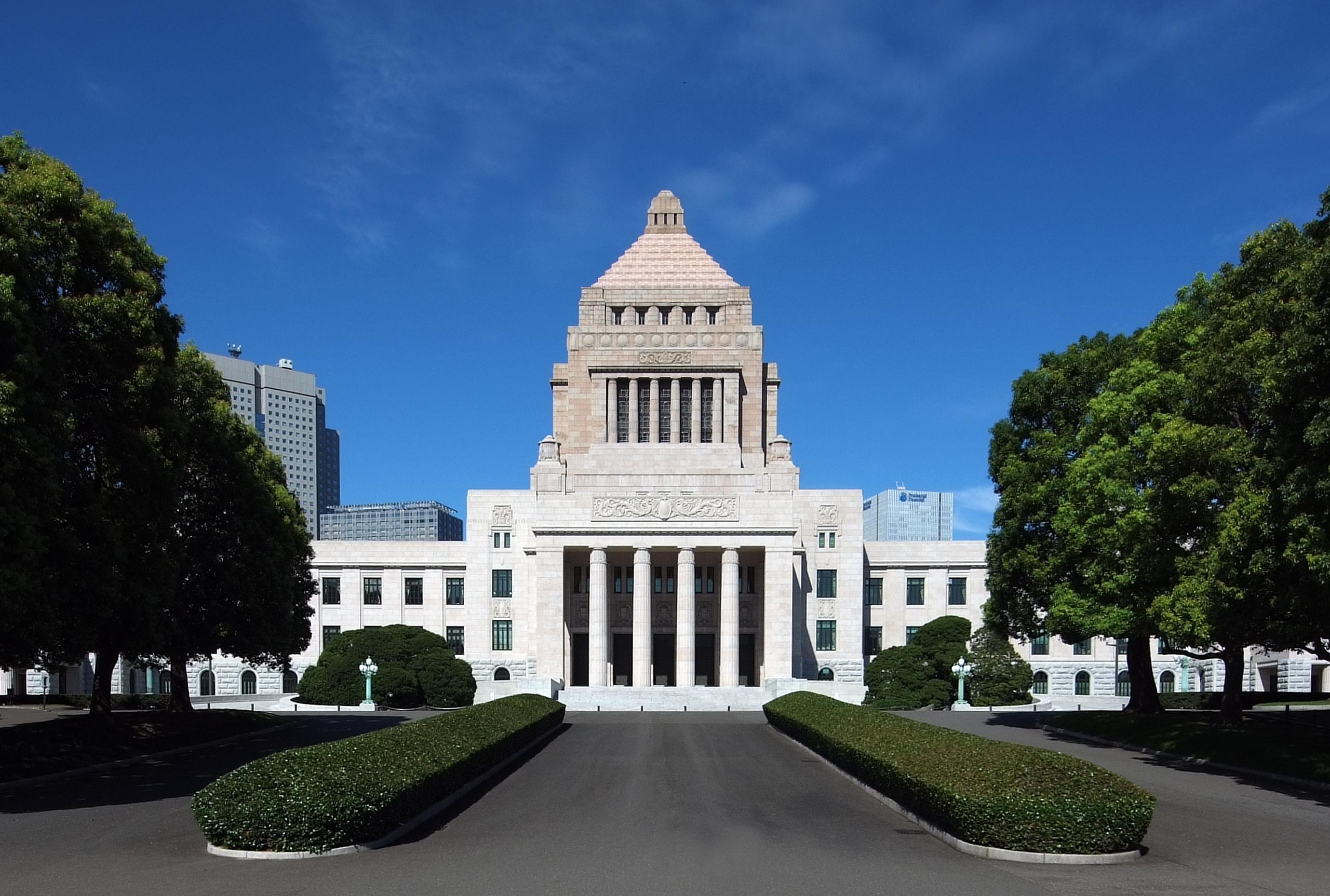

National Diet
- Citation: Law No. 69 of 2026
- Enacted by: House of Representatives
- Enacted: 30 June 2026
- Enacted by: House of Councillors
- Enacted: 17 July 2026
- Effective: 13 August 2026

Legislative history

Initiating chamber: House of Representatives
- Bill title: Law Concerning the Punishment of Damage to the National Flag

Summary
- To prohibit the desecration of the national flag
- Status: Current legislation

The Law Concerning the Punishment of Damage to the National Flag (国旗の損壊等の処罰に関する法律, Kokki no Sonkai-tō no Shobatsu ni Kansuru Hōritsu) is a law that prohibits the desecration of Japan's national flag.

== Text of the law ==
The law states that anyone who "publicly damages, removes or defaces the national flag" in a way that "causes significant discomfort or feelings of hatred among others" could potentially face up to 2 years in prison or a fine of up to ¥200,000 yen.

== Vote ==
The Liberal Democratic Party (LDP) and its coalition partner Japan Innovation Party (JIP) were joined by the Democratic Party for the People (DPFP) and Sanseitō in submitting the bill. The House of Representatives passed the bill on 30 June 2026 during the National Diet. However, the vote was boycotted by all opposition parties, including the Centrist Reform Alliance, the DPFP and Sanseitō to protest the governing coalition's steering of parliamentary debate.

The legislation was then sent to the House of Councillors and passed on 17 July 2026. It was enacted as law on 13 August.
