= Nara at-large district =

Japan House of Councillors constituency

- 奈良県選挙区
- Parliamentary constituency for the House of Councillors
- Prefecture: Nara
- Electorate: 1,121,510 (as of September 2022)

Current constituency
- Created: 1947
- Seats: 2
- Councillors: Class of 2019: Iwao Horii (LDP); Class of 2022: Kei Satō (LDP)

Nara at-large district is a constituency in the House of Councillors of Japan, the upper house of the Diet of Japan (national legislature). The district elects two councillors, with one seat contested at each regular House of Councillors election.

In the 2025 House of Councillors election, incumbent Liberal Democratic Party member Iwao Horii was re-elected to a third term, receiving 175,450 votes, or 26.6% of the calid voe. Democratic Party for the People candidate Aoi Sugimoto finished second with 142,740 votes, followed by Japan Innovation Party candidate Masaki Taira with 127,173 votes. Horii's re-election retained the seat for the LDP, although the party's Nara prefectural organisation subsequently described the result as reflecting declining voter confidence in the party,

The assassination of Shinzo Abe also occurred in Nara during the 2022 election campaign while he was campaigning for LDP candidate Kei Satō, who subsequently won the district's seat.

At the 2025 election, the district had 1,105,690 eligible voters, with a turnout of 61.52%.
