= 2026 Japanese general election in Kinki =

- 8 February 2026

All 73 seats to the House of Representatives
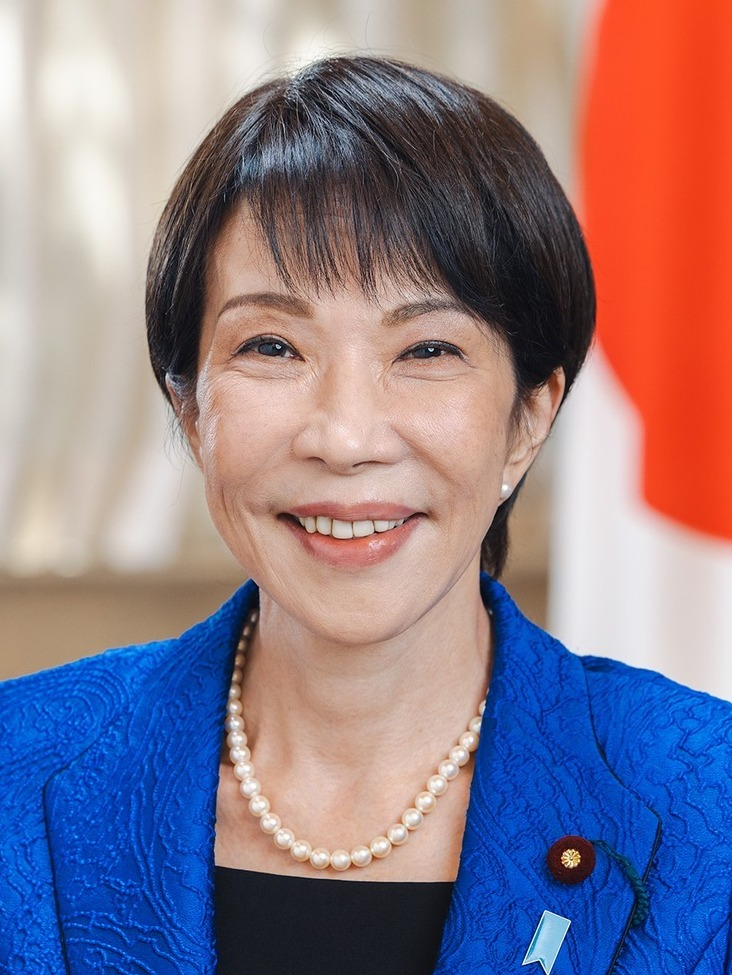

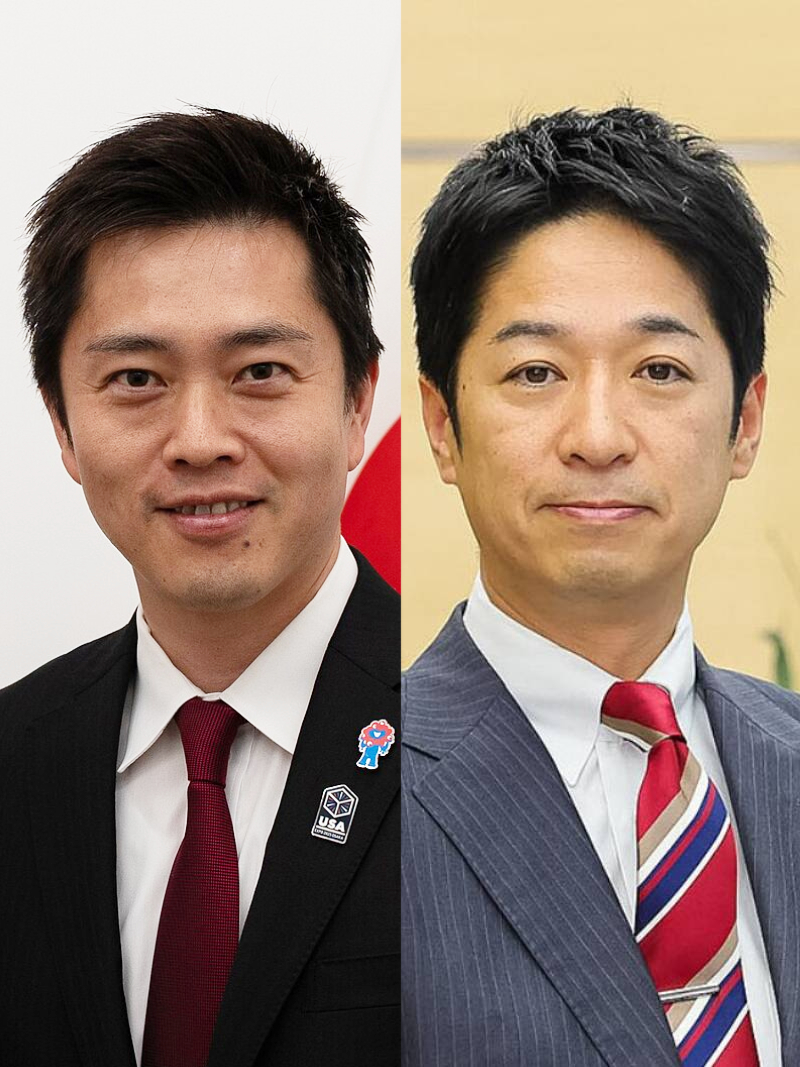

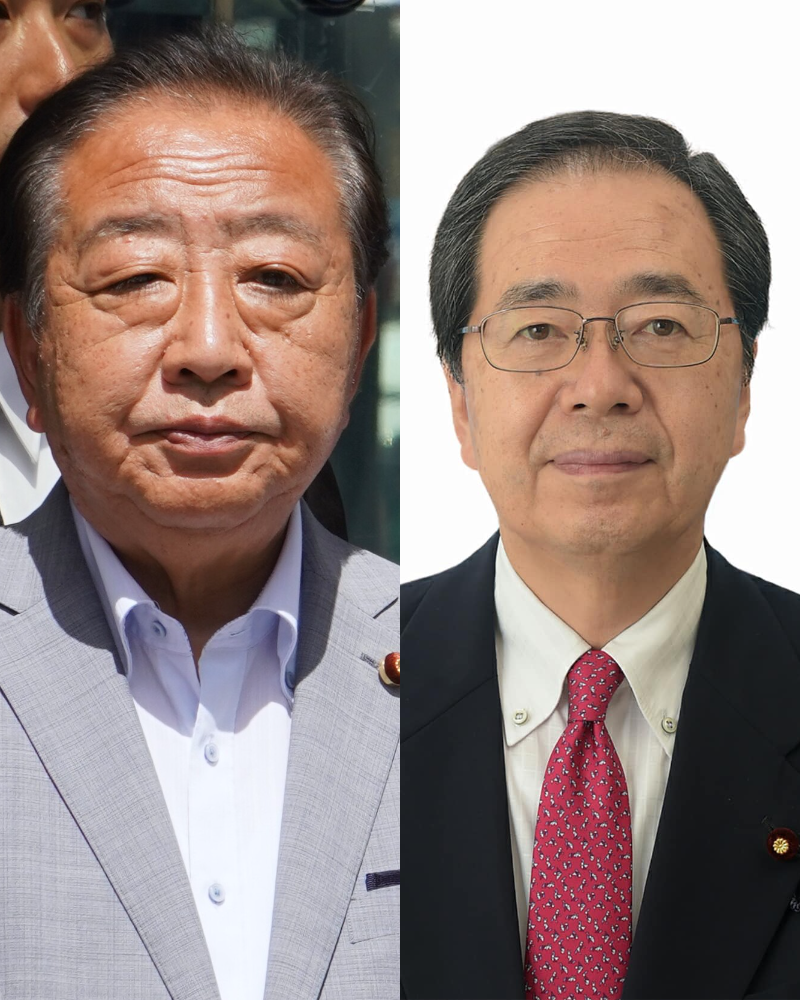

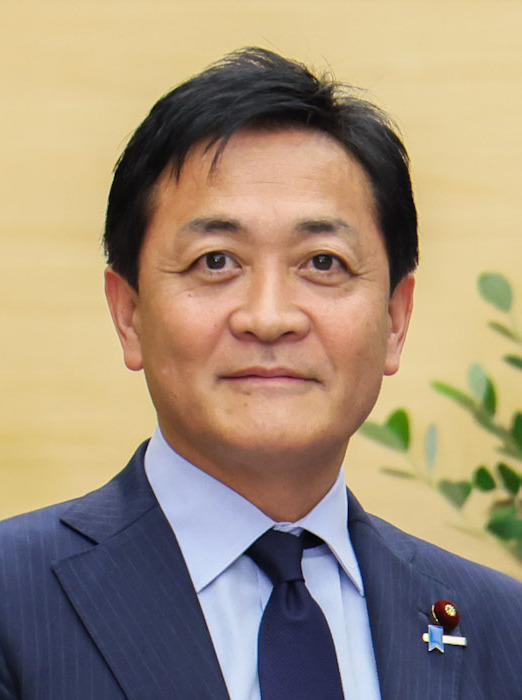

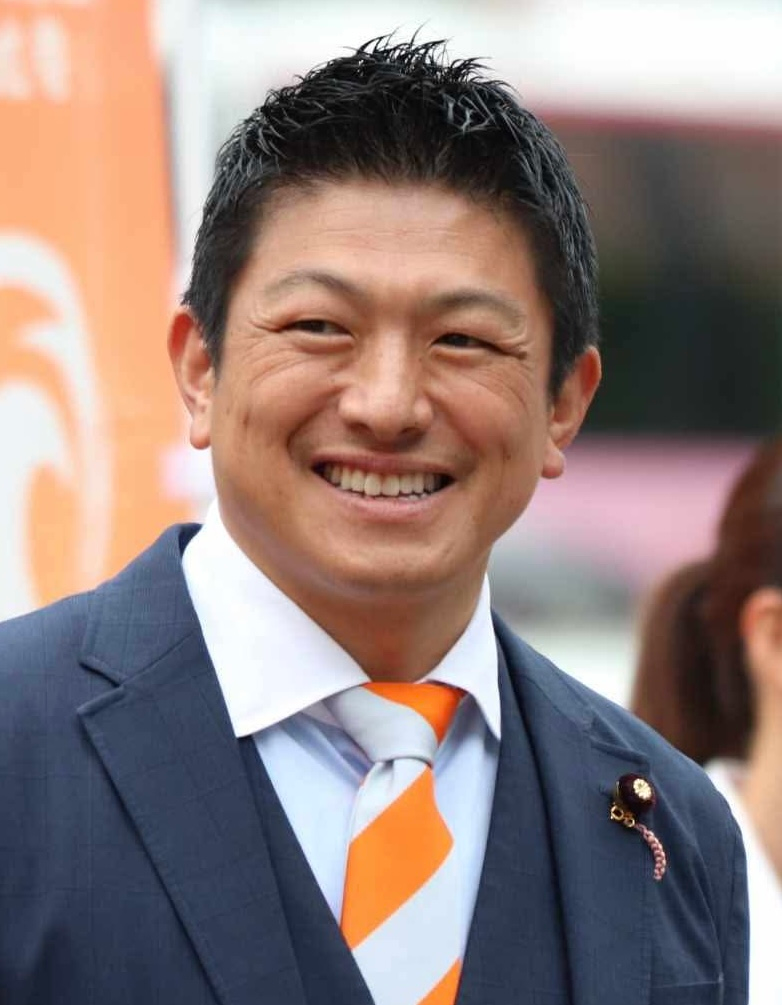

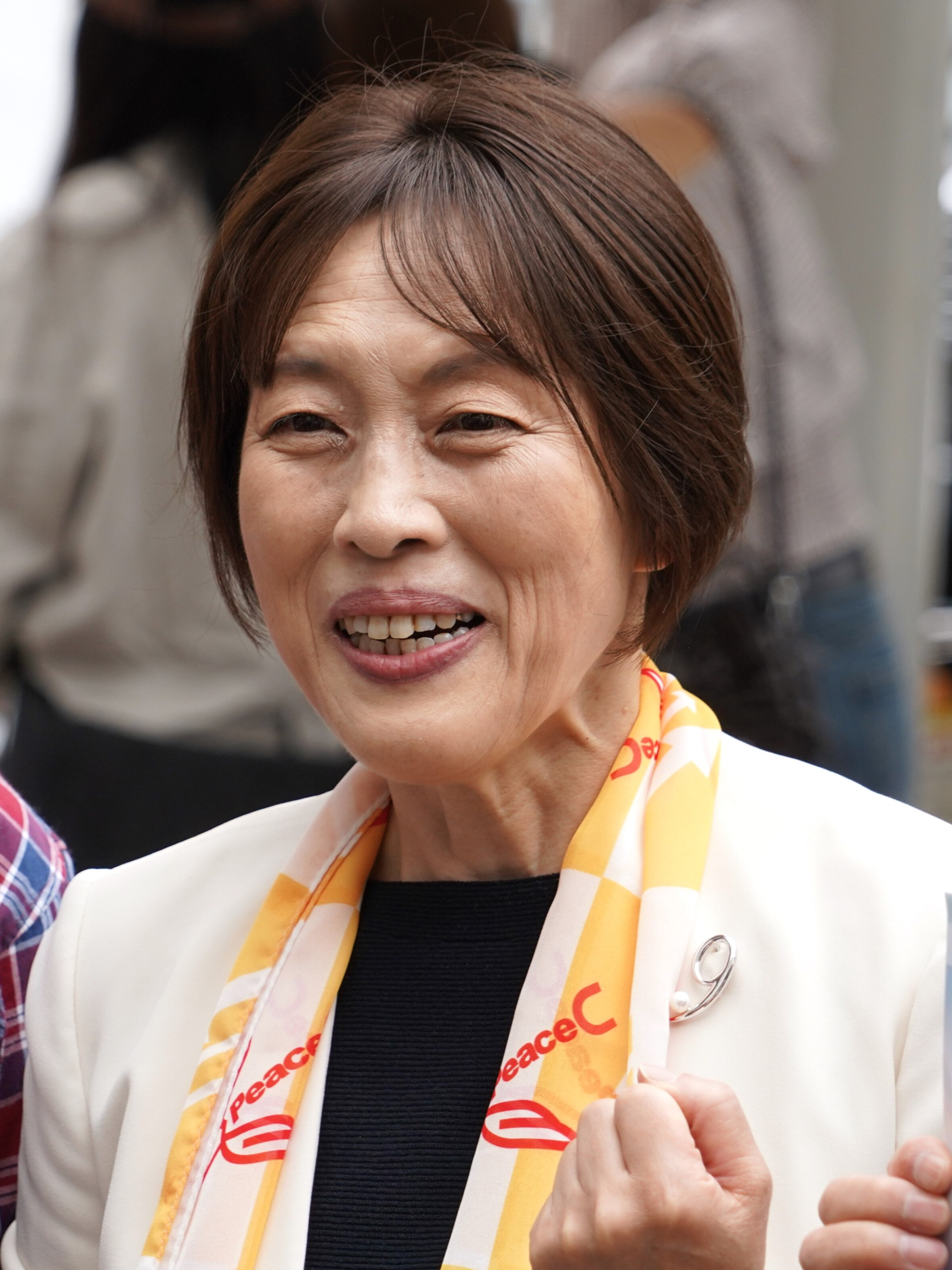

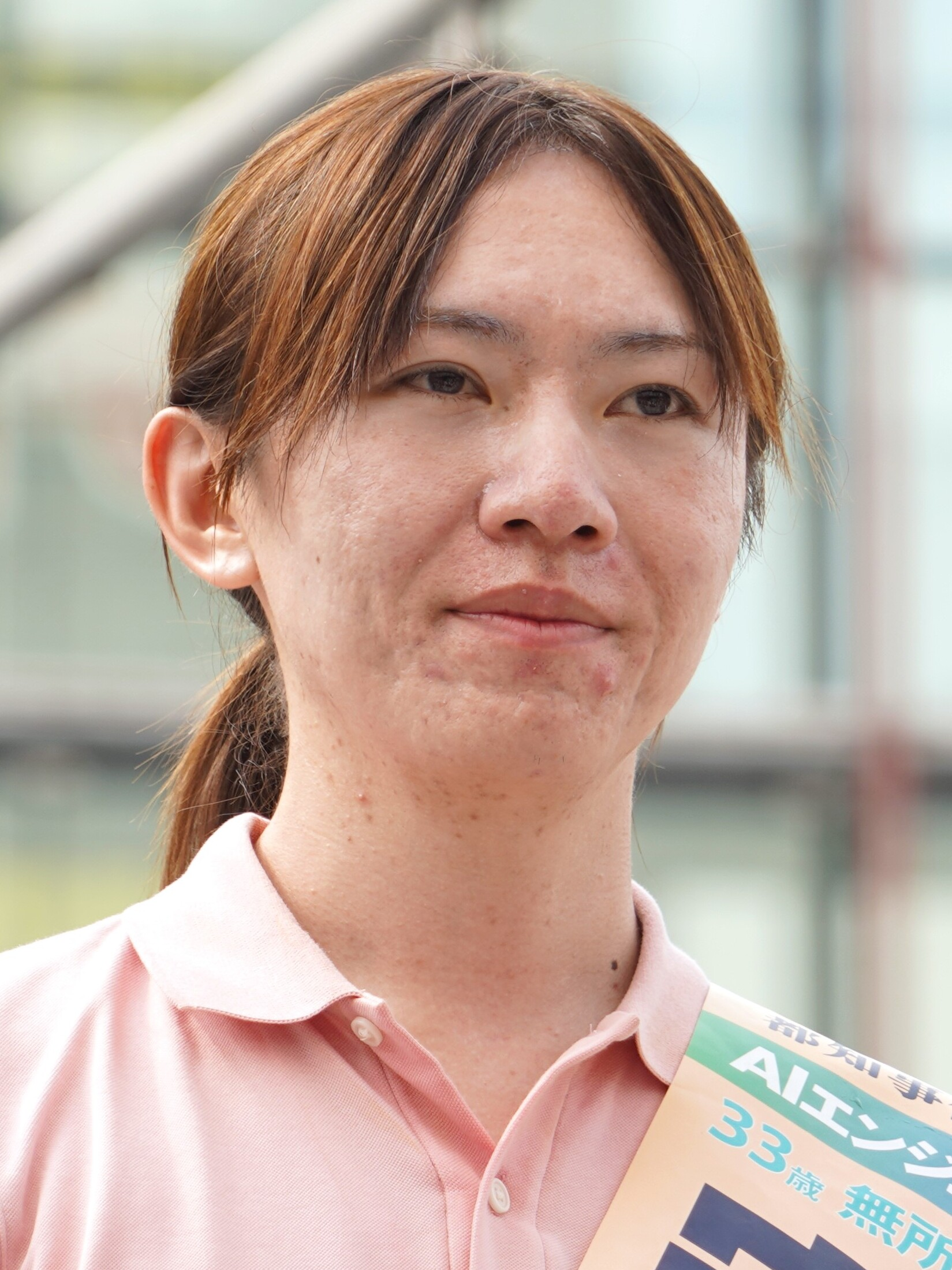

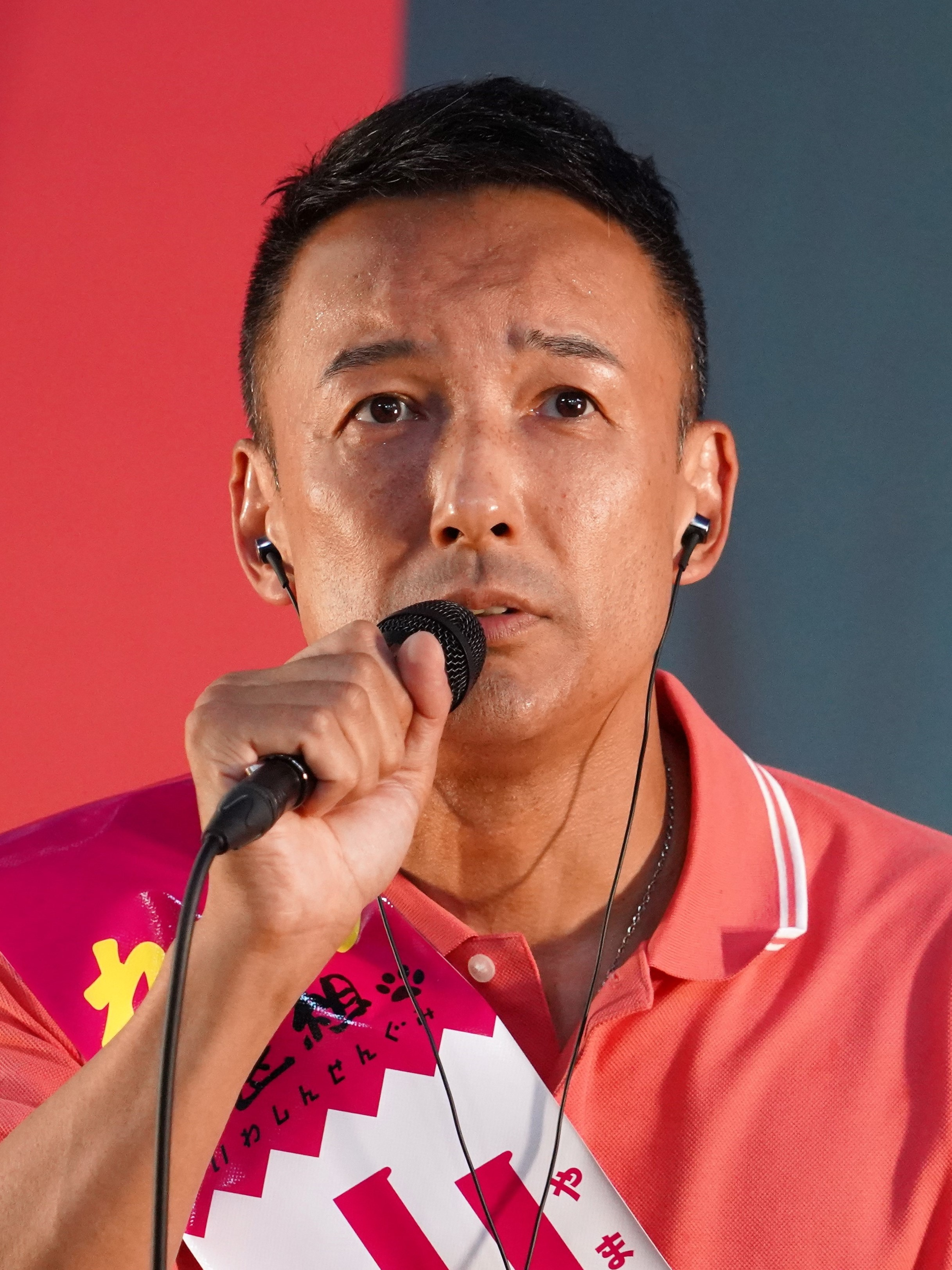
	Majority party	Minority party	Third party
Party	LDP	Ishin	Centrist Reform
Last election	20 seats	28 seats	14 seats (Note: As CDP and Komeito)
Con. vote	3,451,128; 37.82%	2,583,489; 28.31%	1,112,734; 12.20%
Con. seats	23	20	1
PR vote	2,842,876; 30.41%	2,168,635; 23.20%	1,332,752; 14.26%
PR seats	10	8	5
Total seats	33	28	6
Seat change	▲13	0	▼8
	Fourth party	Fifth party	Sixth party
Party	DPP	Sanseito	JCP
Last election	2 seats	1 seat	2 seats
Con. vote	281,200; 3.08%	552,975; 6.06%	744,603; 8.16%
Con. seats	0	0	0
PR vote	651,785; 6.97%	631,179; 6.75%	480,188; 5.14%
PR seats	2	2	1
Total seats	2	2	1
Seat change	0	▲1	▼1
	Seventh party	Eighth party	Ninth party
Party	Team Mirai	CPJ	Reiwa
Last election	Did not exist	1 seat	2 seats
Con. vote	28,386; 0.31%	–	52,179; 0.57%
Con. seats	0	–	0
PR vote	553,496; 5.92%	259,052; 2.77%	247,048; 2.64%
PR seats	0	0	0
Total seats	0	0	0
Seat change	0	▼1	▼2

This page contains the detailed results for the 2026 Japanese general election in the Kinki proportional representation block.

The Kinki block covers the prefectures of Shiga, Kyoto, Osaka, Hyogo, Nara and Wakayama and elects 28 members by party-list proportional representation. In addition to the block seats, Kinki has 45 constituencies each electing a single member by first-past-the-post voting.

== Overall results ==
Party	Constituency			Proportional			Total seats
Party	Votes	%	Seats	Votes	%	Seats	Total seats
Liberal Democratic Party	3,451,128	37.82	23	2,842,876	30.41	10	33
Nippon Ishin no Kai	2,583,489	28.31	20	2,168,635	23.20	8	28
Centrist Reform Alliance	1,112,734	12.20	1	1,332,752	14.26	5	6
Democratic Party For the People	281,200	3.08	0	651,785	6.97	2	2
Sanseito	552,975	6.06	0	631,179	6.75	2	2
Team Mirai	28,386	0.31	0	553,496	5.92	0	0
Japanese Communist Party	744,603	8.16	0	480,188	5.14	1	1
Conservative Party of Japan				259,052	2.77	0	0
Reiwa Shinsengumi	52,179	0.57	0	247,048	2.64	0	0
Tax Cuts Japan and Yukoku Alliance				105,647	1.13	0	0
Social Democratic Party	30,493	0.33	0	75,014	0.80	0	0
Independent	256,711	2.81	1				1
Others	30,509	0.33	0				0
Total	9,124,407	100.00	45	9,347,672	100.00	28	73
Invalid/blank votes							
Voter turnout							
Registered voters							

== Single-member constituencies ==
Single-member constituency results in Kinki
Constituency	Previous member		Elected member		Votes	%	Margin	Status
Shiga 1st	Alex Saito	Ishin	Toshitaka Ōoka	LDP	76,367	42.0	29,150	LDP gain from Ishin
Shiga 2nd	Kenichiro Ueno	LDP	Kenichiro Ueno	LDP	141,853	60.1	94,721	LDP hold
Shiga 3rd	Nobuhide Takemura	LDP	Nobuhide Takemura	LDP	108,917	48.6	71,933	LDP hold
Kyoto 1st	Yasushi Katsume	LDP	Yasushi Katsume	LDP	78,098	37.0	49,199	LDP hold
Kyoto 2nd	Seiji Maehara	Ishin	Seiji Maehara	Ishin	49,415	35.7	12,524	Ishin hold
Kyoto 3rd	Kenta Izumi	CRA	Kenta Izumi	CRA	68,533	36.6	6,127	CRA hold
Kyoto 4th	Keiro Kitagami	LDP	Keiro Kitagami	LDP	142,149	73.7	91,459	LDP hold
Kyoto 5th	Taro Honda	LDP	Taro Honda	LDP	84,865	77.0	59,502	LDP hold
Kyoto 6th	Kazunori Yamanoi	CRA	Hiromichi Sonozaki	LDP	124,175	47.9	32,253	LDP gain from CRA
Osaka 1st	Inoue Hidetaka	Ishin	Inoue Hidetaka	Ishin	93,383	40.2	28,900	Ishin hold
Osaka 2nd	Tadashi Morishima	Ind.	Ryo Takami	Ishin	115,244	51.9	74,572	Ishin gain from Ind.
Osaka 3rd	Toru Azuma	Ishin	Toru Azuma	Ishin	75,462	40.4	29,747	Ishin hold
Osaka 4th	Teruo Minobe	Ishin	Teruo Minobe	Ishin	87,309	37.2	16,269	Ishin hold
Osaka 5th	Satoshi Umemura	Ishin	Satoshi Umemura	Ishin	93,472	42.5	45,421	Ishin hold
Osaka 6th	Kaoru Nishida	Ishin	Kaoru Nishida	Ishin	87,431	42.6	44,812	Ishin hold
Osaka 7th	Takemitsu Okushita	Ishin	Takemitsu Okushita	Ishin	88,242	39.1	9,660	Ishin hold
Osaka 8th	Joji Uruma	Ishin	Joji Uruma	Ishin	93,189	38.6	15,501	Ishin hold
Osaka 9th	Kei Hagiwara	Ishin	Kei Hagiwara	Ishin	102,204	48.2	22,945	Ishin hold
Osaka 10th	Taku Ikeshita	Ishin	Taku Ikeshita	Ishin	86,557	45.1	36,233	Ishin hold
Osaka 11th	Hiroshi Nakatsuka	Ishin	Hiroshi Nakatsuka	Ishin	113,436	49.4	71,627	Ishin hold
Osaka 12th	Fumitake Fujita	Ishin	Fumitake Fujita	Ishin	88,775	50.2	50,608	Ishin hold
Osaka 13th	Ryohei Iwatani	Ishin	Ryohei Iwatani	Ishin	77,433	37.9	12,240	Ishin hold
Osaka 14th	Hitoshi Aoyagi	Ishin	Hitoshi Aoyagi	Ishin	121,049	57.8	62,476	Ishin hold
Osaka 15th	Yasuto Urano	Ishin	Yasuto Urano	Ishin	92,248	47.9	18,870	Ishin hold
Osaka 16th	Masaki Kuroda	Ishin	Masaki Kuroda	Ishin	73,063	41.2	25,219	Ishin hold
Osaka 17th	Nobuyuki Baba	Ishin	Nobuyuki Baba	Ishin	78,362	49.0	35,647	Ishin hold
Osaka 18th	Takashi Endo	Ishin	Takashi Endo	Ishin	121,948	58.4	63,059	Ishin hold
Osaka 19th	Nobuhisa Ito	Ishin	Tomu Tanigawa	LDP	58,410	36.9	713	LDP gain from Ishin
Hyōgo 1st	Nobuhiko Isaka	CRA	Masahito Moriyama	LDP	73,219	33.5	4,108	LDP gain from CRA
Hyōgo 2nd	Kazuyoshi Akaba	CRA	Keishi Abe	Ishin	82,982	45.0	36,674	Ishin gain from CRA
Hyōgo 3rd	Yoshihiro Seki	LDP	Yoshihiro Seki	LDP	74,806	46.9	40,534	LDP hold
Hyōgo 4th	Hisayuki Fujii	LDP	Hisayuki Fujii	LDP	147,544	69.3	98,357	LDP hold
Hyōgo 5th	Koichi Tani	LDP	Koichi Tani	LDP	93,501	44.6	38,717	LDP hold
Hyōgo 6th	Shu Sakurai	CRA	Masaki Ogushi	LDP	91,440	36.4	27,996	LDP gain from CRA
Hyōgo 7th	Kenji Yamada	LDP	Kenji Yamada	LDP	112,151	42.4	40,931	LDP hold
Hyōgo 8th	Hiromasa Nakano	CRA	Shigeharu Aoyama	LDP	85,970	43.3	37,876	LDP gain from CRA
Hyōgo 9th	Yasutoshi Nishimura	LDP	Yasutoshi Nishimura	LDP	116,526	58.3	61,919	LDP hold
Hyōgo 10th	Kisaburo Tokai	LDP	Kisaburo Tokai	LDP	75,309	41.0	37,402	LDP hold
Hyōgo 11th	Takeaki Matsumoto	LDP	Takeaki Matsumoto	LDP	86,090	43.5	30,333	LDP hold
Hyōgo 12th	Tsuyoshi Yamaguchi	LDP	Tsuyoshi Yamaguchi	LDP	78,957	53.1	25,075	LDP hold
Nara 1st	Sumio Mabuchi	CRA	Shigeki Kobayashi	LDP	131,313	53.3	66,988	LDP gain from CRA
Nara 2nd	Sanae Takaichi	LDP	Sanae Takaichi	LDP	193,708	87.0	164,787	LDP hold
Nara 3rd	Taido Tanose	LDP	Taido Tanose	LDP	120,018	62.8	82,951	LDP hold
Wakayama 1st	Daichi Yamamoto	LDP	Daichi Yamamoto	LDP	95,836	46.2	64,484	LDP hold
Wakayama 2nd	Hiroshige Sekō	Ind.	Hiroshige Sekō	Ind.	162,257	82.2	127,048	Ind. hold

=== Shiga Prefecture ===
Shiga Prefecture
Party	Constituency			Proportional	
Party	Votes	%	Seats	Votes	%
Liberal Democratic Party	327,137	51.00	3	236,085	36.42
Nippon Ishin no Kai	131,099	20.44	0	101,354	15.63
Centrist Reform Alliance	76,727	11.96	0	82,538	12.73
Democratic Party For the People	38,911	6.07	0	57,672	8.90
Sanseito	30,202	4.71	0	47,678	7.35
Team Mirai				42,041	6.49
Japanese Communist Party	29,441	4.59	0	31,730	4.89
Reiwa Shinsengumi	7,989	1.25	0	21,612	3.33
Conservative Party of Japan				15,095	2.33
Tax Cuts Japan and Yukoku Alliance				6,916	1.07
Social Democratic Party				5,559	0.86
Total	641,506	100.00	3	648,280	100.00
Invalid/blank votes					
Voter turnout					
Registered voters					

Shiga 1st district
Party	Candidate	Constituency		Proportional	
Party	Candidate	Votes	%	Votes	%
Liberal Democratic Party	Toshitaka Ōoka	76,367	42.03	62,961	34.07
Nippon Ishin no Kai	Alex Saito	47,217	25.99	29,649	16.04
Centrist Reform Alliance				23,305	12.61
Democratic Party For the People	Akinari Kawai	38,911	21.42	19,191	10.39
Team Mirai				13,156	7.12
Sanseito				11,686	6.32
Japanese Communist Party	Akiko Kinose	19,198	10.57	10,954	5.93
Reiwa Shinsengumi				5,530	2.99
Conservative Party of Japan				4,512	2.44
Tax Cuts Japan and Yukoku Alliance				2,099	1.14
Social Democratic Party				1,747	0.95
Total		181,693	100.00	184,790	100.00
Invalid/blank votes					
Voter turnout			57.78		
Registered voters		323,075		323,075	
LDP gain from Ishin					

Shiga 2nd district
Party	Candidate	Constituency		Proportional	
Party	Candidate	Votes	%	Votes	%
Liberal Democratic Party	Kenichiro Ueno	141,853	60.14	92,338	38.68
Centrist Reform Alliance	Michio Hirao	47,132	19.98	31,751	13.30
Nippon Ishin no Kai	Kyosuke Okaya	46,898	19.88	36,198	15.16
Democratic Party For the People				18,846	7.89
Sanseito				16,981	7.11
Team Mirai				13,516	5.66
Japanese Communist Party				11,197	4.69
Reiwa Shinsengumi				8,191	3.43
Conservative Party of Japan				5,183	2.17
Tax Cuts Japan and Yukoku Alliance				2,499	1.05
Social Democratic Party				2,046	0.86
Total		235,883	100.00	238,746	100.00
Invalid/blank votes					
Voter turnout			56.48		
Registered voters		427,537		427,537	
LDP hold					

Shiga 3rd district
Party	Candidate	Constituency		Proportional	
Party	Candidate	Votes	%	Votes	%
Liberal Democratic Party	Nobuhide Takemura	108,917	48.64	80,786	35.95
Nippon Ishin no Kai	Shingo Deji	36,984	16.52	35,507	15.80
Sanseito	Yuko Kitano	30,202	13.49	19,011	8.46
Centrist Reform Alliance	Tomoyuki Haya	29,595	13.22	27,482	12.23
Democratic Party For the People				19,635	8.74
Team Mirai				15,369	6.84
Japanese Communist Party	Yuu Ibuki	10,243	4.57	9,579	4.26
Reiwa Shinsengumi	Narumi Yasumochi	7,989	3.57	7,891	3.51
Conservative Party of Japan				5,400	2.40
Tax Cuts Japan and Yukoku Alliance				2,318	1.03
Social Democratic Party				1,766	0.79
Total		223,930	100.00	224,744	100.00
Invalid/blank votes					
Voter turnout			57.73		
Registered voters		392,963		392,963	
LDP hold					

=== Kyoto Prefecture ===
Kyoto Prefecture
Party	Constituency			Proportional	
Party	Votes	%	Seats	Votes	%
Liberal Democratic Party	528,584	48.09	4	361,012	32.26
Centrist Reform Alliance	207,539	18.88	1	170,309	15.22
Nippon Ishin no Kai	103,046	9.37	1	167,242	14.94
Japanese Communist Party	150,734	13.71	0	102,297	9.14
Democratic Party For the People	13,644	1.24	0	83,729	7.48
Team Mirai	28,386	2.58	0	76,106	6.80
Sanseito	50,362	4.58	0	72,695	6.50
Reiwa Shinsengumi	4,016	0.37	0	31,763	2.84
Conservative Party of Japan				30,834	2.76
Tax Cuts Japan and Yukoku Alliance				13,347	1.19
Social Democratic Party				9,820	0.88
Total	1,099,196	100.00	6	1,119,154	100.00
Invalid/blank votes					
Voter turnout					
Registered voters					

Kyoto 1st district
Party	Candidate	Constituency		Proportional	
Party	Candidate	Votes	%	Votes	%
Liberal Democratic Party	Yasushi Katsume	78,098	36.99	64,313	30.36
Centrist Reform Alliance	Kozo Hiratake	28,899	13.69	26,322	12.42
Nippon Ishin no Kai	Takashi Sasaki	26,147	12.38	31,716	14.97
Japanese Communist Party	Toshinori Kamano	21,382	10.13	21,222	10.02
Team Mirai	Sachiko Horiba	17,208	8.15	19,165	9.05
Democratic Party For the People	Takatoshi Katsura	13,644	6.46	17,467	8.24
Independent	Satoshi Hamada	12,885	6.10		
Sanseito	Aohito Taniguchi	12,881	6.10	13,827	6.53
Conservative Party of Japan				7,020	3.31
Reiwa Shinsengumi				6,039	2.85
Tax Cuts Japan and Yukoku Alliance				2,837	1.34
Social Democratic Party				1,927	0.91
Total		211,144	100.00	211,855	100.00
Invalid/blank votes					
Voter turnout			55.55		
Registered voters		385,158		385,158	
LDP hold					

Kyoto 2nd district
Party	Candidate	Constituency		Proportional	
Party	Candidate	Votes	%	Votes	%
Nippon Ishin no Kai	Seiji Maehara	49,415	35.67	21,578	15.46
Liberal Democratic Party	Yoji Fujita	36,891	26.63	40,881	29.30
Japanese Communist Party	Akiko Horikawa	18,847	13.60	16,146	11.57
Centrist Reform Alliance	Yuriko Kono	18,185	13.13	19,255	13.80
Team Mirai	Yusuke Sakai	11,178	8.07	11,377	8.15
Democratic Party For the People				10,376	7.44
Sanseito				8,216	5.89
Reiwa Shinsengumi	Chihiro Tsujimura	4,016	2.90	4,689	3.36
Conservative Party of Japan				3,814	2.73
Tax Cuts Japan and Yukoku Alliance				1,718	1.23
Social Democratic Party				1,498	1.07
Total		138,532	100.00	139,548	100.00
Invalid/blank votes					
Voter turnout			55.30		
Registered voters		255,259		255,259	
Ishin hold					

Kyoto 3rd district
Party	Candidate	Constituency		Proportional	
Party	Candidate	Votes	%	Votes	%
Centrist Reform Alliance	Kenta Izumi	68,533	36.64	33,179	17.69
Liberal Democratic Party	Mamoru Shigemoto	62,406	33.36	58,456	31.16
Nippon Ishin no Kai	Motoki Kimura	27,484	14.69	27,957	14.90
Japanese Communist Party	Nobuhide Nishiyama	15,670	8.38	15,995	8.53
Democratic Party For the People				14,027	7.48
Sanseito	Satoru Higuchi	12,951	6.92	12,122	6.46
Team Mirai				12,017	6.41
Conservative Party of Japan				5,105	2.72
Reiwa Shinsengumi				4,968	2.65
Tax Cuts Japan and Yukoku Alliance				2,181	1.16
Social Democratic Party				1,570	0.84
Total		187,044	100.00	187,577	100.00
Invalid/blank votes					
Voter turnout			54.74		
Registered voters		346,480		346,480	
LDP hold					

Kyoto 4th district
Party	Candidate	Constituency		Proportional	
Party	Candidate	Votes	%	Votes	%
Liberal Democratic Party	Keiro Kitagami	142,149	73.71	64,329	31.59
Nippon Ishin no Kai				30,822	15.14
Centrist Reform Alliance				29,315	14.40
Japanese Communist Party	Koichi Yoshida	50,690	26.29	20,048	9.85
Democratic Party For the People				15,898	7.81
Sanseito				13,824	6.79
Team Mirai				12,970	6.37
Reiwa Shinsengumi				6,221	3.06
Conservative Party of Japan				5,848	2.87
Tax Cuts Japan and Yukoku Alliance				2,492	1.22
Social Democratic Party				1,839	0.90
Total		192,839	100.00	203,606	100.00
Invalid/blank votes					
Voter turnout			53.63		
Registered voters		384,986		384,986	
LDP hold					

Kyoto 5th district
Party	Candidate	Constituency		Proportional	
Party	Candidate	Votes	%	Votes	%
Liberal Democratic Party	Taro Honda	84,865	76.99	44,195	38.33
Centrist Reform Alliance				16,927	14.68
Nippon Ishin no Kai				15,449	13.40
Japanese Communist Party	Ken Yamauchi	25,363	23.01	10,266	8.90
Democratic Party For the People				7,766	6.73
Sanseito				7,214	6.26
Team Mirai				5,664	4.91
Reiwa Shinsengumi				3,136	2.72
Conservative Party of Japan				2,560	2.22
Tax Cuts Japan and Yukoku Alliance				1,241	1.08
Social Democratic Party				895	0.78
Total		110,228	100.00	115,313	100.00
Invalid/blank votes					
Voter turnout			52.31		
Registered voters		223,914		223,914	
LDP hold					

Kyoto 6th district
Party	Candidate	Constituency		Proportional	
Party	Candidate	Votes	%	Votes	%
Liberal Democratic Party	Hiromichi Sonozaki	124,175	47.87	88,838	34.00
Centrist Reform Alliance	Kazunori Yamanoi	91,922	35.44	45,311	17.34
Nippon Ishin no Kai				39,720	15.20
Sanseito	Daina	24,530	9.46	17,492	6.70
Japanese Communist Party	Ryoichi Kamijou	18,782	7.24	18,620	7.13
Democratic Party For the People				18,195	6.96
Team Mirai				14,913	5.71
Reiwa Shinsengumi				6,710	2.57
Conservative Party of Japan				6,487	2.48
Tax Cuts Japan and Yukoku Alliance				2,878	1.10
Social Democratic Party				2,091	0.80
Total		259,409	100.00	261,255	100.00
Invalid/blank votes					
Voter turnout			58.52		
Registered voters		451,308		451,308	
LDP gain from CRA					

=== Osaka Prefecture ===
Osaka Prefecture
Party	Constituency			Proportional	
Party	Votes	%	Seats	Votes	%
Nippon Ishin no Kai	1,746,504	44.91	18	1,301,168	32.34
Liberal Democratic Party	1,019,019	26.20	1	949,883	23.61
Centrist Reform Alliance	289,892	7.45	0	535,117	13.30
Sanseito	307,579	7.91	0	270,778	6.73
Democratic Party For the People	109,240	2.81	0	250,773	6.23
Team Mirai				225,477	5.60
Japanese Communist Party	311,640	8.01	0	194,218	4.83
Conservative Party of Japan				118,838	2.95
Reiwa Shinsengumi	29,964	0.77	0	102,839	2.56
Tax Cuts Japan and Yukoku Alliance				45,689	1.14
Social Democratic Party	30,493	0.78	0	28,335	0.70
Independents	40,672	1.05	0		
Other parties	4,299	0.11	0		
Total	3,889,302	100.00	19	4,023,115	100.00
Invalid/blank votes					
Voter turnout					
Registered voters					

Osaka 1st district
Party	Candidate	Constituency		Proportional	
Party	Candidate	Votes	%	Votes	%
Nippon Ishin no Kai	Inoue Hidetaka	93,383	40.22	74,942	31.22
Liberal Democratic Party	Hiroyuki Onishi	64,483	27.78	57,747	24.06
Centrist Reform Alliance				23,449	9.77
Sanseito	Yuki Nakamura	27,950	12.04	18,221	7.59
Democratic Party For the People	Tomoo Shiono	27,902	12.02	18,083	7.53
Team Mirai				17,226	7.18
Conservative Party of Japan				9,627	4.01
Japanese Communist Party	Yoshinori Takauchi	18,444	7.94	9,541	3.97
Reiwa Shinsengumi				6,118	2.55
Tax Cuts Japan and Yukoku Alliance				3,607	1.50
Social Democratic Party				1,467	0.61
Total		232,162	100.00	240,028	100.00
Invalid/blank votes					
Voter turnout			54.33		
Registered voters		446,375		446,375	
Ishin hold					

Osaka 2nd district
Party	Candidate	Constituency		Proportional	
Party	Candidate	Votes	%	Votes	%
Nippon Ishin no Kai	Ryo Takami	115,244	51.95	76,300	32.01
Liberal Democratic Party				53,045	22.25
Independent	Tadashi Morishima	40,672	18.33		
Centrist Reform Alliance				33,882	14.21
Sanseito	Atsushi Itsubashi	36,999	16.68	17,530	7.35
Democratic Party For the People				13,809	5.79
Team Mirai				12,739	5.34
Japanese Communist Party	Youta Ogawa	28,925	13.04	12,030	5.05
Conservative Party of Japan				7,547	3.17
Reiwa Shinsengumi				6,867	2.88
Tax Cuts Japan and Yukoku Alliance				3,065	1.29
Social Democratic Party				1,581	0.66
Total		221,840	100.00	238,395	100.00
Invalid/blank votes					
Voter turnout			54.98		
Registered voters		439,978		439,978	
Ishin gain from Ind.					

Osaka 3rd district
Party	Candidate	Constituency		Proportional	
Party	Candidate	Votes	%	Votes	%
Nippon Ishin no Kai	Toru Azuma	75,462	40.36	60,985	32.33
Liberal Democratic Party	Akira Yanagimoto	45,715	24.45	40,551	21.50
Centrist Reform Alliance	Yuuko Utsonomiya	30,714	16.43	29,552	15.67
Sanseito	Takafumi Yamamuro	18,345	9.81	13,453	7.13
Japanese Communist Party	Yui Watanabe	16,758	8.96	10,480	5.56
Democratic Party For the People				10,012	5.31
Team Mirai				8,371	4.44
Conservative Party of Japan				6,017	3.19
Reiwa Shinsengumi				5,810	3.08
Tax Cuts Japan and Yukoku Alliance				2,203	1.17
Social Democratic Party				1,212	0.64
Total		186,994	100.00	188,646	100.00
Invalid/blank votes					
Voter turnout			53.89		
Registered voters		355,049		355,049	
Ishin hold					

Osaka 4th district
Party	Candidate	Constituency		Proportional	
Party	Candidate	Votes	%	Votes	%
Nippon Ishin no Kai	Teruo Minobe	87,309	37.19	83,035	34.21
Liberal Democratic Party	Yasuhide Nakayama	71,040	30.26	53,228	21.93
Centrist Reform Alliance				24,436	10.07
Democratic Party For the People	Tadashi Okamoto	28,240	12.03	17,712	7.30
Team Mirai				17,082	7.04
Sanseito	Miki Fujita	24,019	10.23	16,899	6.96
Japanese Communist Party	Minori Yamada	19,832	8.45	11,170	4.60
Conservative Party of Japan				8,539	3.52
Reiwa Shinsengumi				5,986	2.47
Other	Kazuya Hashiguchi	4,299	1.83		
Tax Cuts Japan and Yukoku Alliance				3,101	1.28
Social Democratic Party				1,546	0.64
Total		234,739	100.00	242,734	100.00
Invalid/blank votes					
Voter turnout			58.87		
Registered voters		416,717		416,717	
Ishin hold					

Osaka 5th district
Party	Candidate	Constituency		Proportional	
Party	Candidate	Votes	%	Votes	%
Nippon Ishin no Kai	Satoshi Umemura	93,472	42.55	72,666	31.49
Liberal Democratic Party	Mio Sugita	48,051	21.87	48,712	21.11
Centrist Reform Alliance				31,591	13.69
Democratic Party For the People	Hidemichi Maeda	24,018	10.93	16,798	7.28
Sanseito	Keiko Matsuyama	18,421	8.39	15,957	6.91
Team Mirai				12,633	5.47
Reiwa Shinsengumi	Akiko Ōishi	19,867	9.04	8,759	3.80
Japanese Communist Party	Ryusuke Minato	15,854	7.22	12,136	5.26
Conservative Party of Japan				7,469	3.24
Tax Cuts Japan and Yukoku Alliance				2,717	1.18
Social Democratic Party				1,341	0.58
Total		219,683	100.00	230,779	100.00
Invalid/blank votes					
Voter turnout			53.92		
Registered voters		432,748		432,748	
Ishin hold					

Osaka 6th district
Party	Candidate	Constituency		Proportional	
Party	Candidate	Votes	%	Votes	%
Nippon Ishin no Kai	Kaoru Nishida	87,431	42.55	68,666	33.03
Liberal Democratic Party	Masashi Nagai	42,619	20.74	44,205	21.27
Centrist Reform Alliance	Hiromi Sakamoto	37,890	18.44	33,746	16.23
Sanseito	Maiko Tsukiashi	24,635	11.99	14,483	6.97
Democratic Party For the People				12,440	5.98
Team Mirai				10,420	5.01
Japanese Communist Party	Atsushi Kamei	12,899	6.28	9,234	4.44
Conservative Party of Japan				5,889	2.83
Reiwa Shinsengumi				5,315	2.56
Tax Cuts Japan and Yukoku Alliance				2,253	1.08
Social Democratic Party				1,223	0.59
Total		205,474	100.00	207,874	100.00
Invalid/blank votes					
Voter turnout			54.84		
Registered voters		384,311		384,311	
Ishin hold					

Osaka 7th district
Party	Candidate	Constituency		Proportional	
Party	Candidate	Votes	%	Votes	%
Nippon Ishin no Kai	Takemitsu Okushita	88,242	39.14	71,927	30.95
Liberal Democratic Party	Naomi Tokashiki	78,582	34.86	55,110	23.71
Centrist Reform Alliance				25,452	10.95
Team Mirai				17,034	7.33
Democratic Party For the People				16,895	7.27
Sanseito	Masaru Ishikawa	30,439	13.50	16,714	7.19
Japanese Communist Party	Tatsuma Kawasoe	28,167	12.49	13,389	5.76
Conservative Party of Japan				6,554	2.82
Reiwa Shinsengumi				5,068	2.18
Tax Cuts Japan and Yukoku Alliance				2,420	1.04
Social Democratic Party				1,842	0.79
Total		225,430	100.00	232,405	100.00
Invalid/blank votes					
Voter turnout			60.22		
Registered voters		389,482		389,482	
Ishin hold					

Osaka 8th district
Party	Candidate	Constituency		Proportional	
Party	Candidate	Votes	%	Votes	%
Nippon Ishin no Kai	Joji Uruma	93,189	38.59	76,724	30.67
Liberal Democratic Party	Keiichiro Korai	77,688	32.17	60,643	24.24
Centrist Reform Alliance				30,990	12.39
Democratic Party For the People	Jun Sato	29,080	12.04	19,205	7.68
Team Mirai				17,888	7.15
Japanese Communist Party	Setsuyo Hirakawa	22,319	9.24	10,797	4.32
Sanseito	Mirei Sakakibara	19,206	7.95	15,582	6.23
Conservative Party of Japan				7,167	2.86
Reiwa Shinsengumi				6,232	2.49
Tax Cuts Japan and Yukoku Alliance				2,929	1.17
Social Democratic Party				2,036	0.81
Total		241,482	100.00	250,193	100.00
Invalid/blank votes					
Voter turnout			60.09		
Registered voters		419,934		419,934	
Ishin hold					

Osaka 9th district
Party	Candidate	Constituency		Proportional	
Party	Candidate	Votes	%	Votes	%
Nippon Ishin no Kai	Kei Hagiwara	102,204	48.22	70,777	31.91
Liberal Democratic Party	Junpei Higashida	79,259	37.39	54,793	24.71
Centrist Reform Alliance				25,893	11.68
Democratic Party For the People				15,340	6.92
Team Mirai				15,282	6.89
Sanseito				13,451	6.07
Japanese Communist Party				9,159	4.13
Conservative Party of Japan				6,106	2.75
Reiwa Shinsengumi				4,999	2.25
Social Democratic Party	Keigo Nishio	30,493	14.39	3,462	1.56
Tax Cuts Japan and Yukoku Alliance				2,508	1.13
Total		211,956	100.00	221,770	100.00
Invalid/blank votes					
Voter turnout			60.24		
Registered voters		372,205		372,205	
Ishin hold					

Osaka 10th district
Party	Candidate	Constituency		Proportional	
Party	Candidate	Votes	%	Votes	%
Nippon Ishin no Kai	Taku Ikeshita	86,557	45.06	60,045	30.90
Centrist Reform Alliance	Kanako Otsuji	50,324	26.20	29,259	15.06
Liberal Democratic Party	Yonosuke Kono	38,442	20.01	46,407	23.88
Democratic Party For the People				13,052	6.72
Team Mirai				12,324	6.34
Sanseito	Tomoya Inoue	16,751	8.72	11,342	5.84
Japanese Communist Party				8,641	4.45
Conservative Party of Japan				4,970	2.56
Reiwa Shinsengumi				4,349	2.24
Tax Cuts Japan and Yukoku Alliance				1,992	1.03
Social Democratic Party				1,926	0.99
Total		192,074	100.00	194,307	100.00
Invalid/blank votes					
Voter turnout			62.06		
Registered voters		316,783		316,783	
Ishin hold					

Osaka 11th district
Party	Candidate	Constituency		Proportional	
Party	Candidate	Votes	%	Votes	%
Nippon Ishin no Kai	Hiroshi Nakatsuka	113,436	49.35	76,080	32.74
Liberal Democratic Party	Naotaka Matsumoto	41,809	18.19	53,400	22.98
Centrist Reform Alliance	Noriatsu Murakami	38,540	16.77	35,123	15.12
Sanseito	Satomi Yamaoka	21,753	9.46	14,204	6.11
Democratic Party For the People				14,171	6.10
Team Mirai				13,097	5.64
Japanese Communist Party	Manabu Kitao	14,310	6.23	10,967	4.72
Conservative Party of Japan				5,817	2.50
Reiwa Shinsengumi				5,280	2.27
Tax Cuts Japan and Yukoku Alliance				2,440	1.05
Social Democratic Party				1,789	0.77
Total		229,848	100.00	232,368	100.00
Invalid/blank votes					
Voter turnout			59.73		
Registered voters		393,359		393,359	
Ishin hold					

Osaka 12th district
Party	Candidate	Constituency		Proportional	
Party	Candidate	Votes	%	Votes	%
Nippon Ishin no Kai	Fumitake Fujita	88,775	50.16	60,023	33.50
Liberal Democratic Party	Shinpei Kitakawa	38,167	21.56	41,368	23.09
Centrist Reform Alliance	Shinji Tarutoko	37,976	21.46	28,229	15.76
Sanseito				10,935	6.10
Democratic Party For the People				9,660	5.39
Japanese Communist Party	Toru Oota	12,082	6.83	8,677	4.84
Team Mirai				8,140	4.54
Conservative Party of Japan				4,876	2.72
Reiwa Shinsengumi				4,352	2.43
Tax Cuts Japan and Yukoku Alliance				1,863	1.04
Social Democratic Party				1,040	0.58
Total		177,000	100.00	179,163	100.00
Invalid/blank votes					
Voter turnout			54.81		
Registered voters		331,318		331,318	
Ishin hold					

Osaka 13th district
Party	Candidate	Constituency		Proportional	
Party	Candidate	Votes	%	Votes	%
Nippon Ishin no Kai	Ryohei Iwatani	77,433	37.88	68,663	32.85
Liberal Democratic Party	Kōichi Munekiyo	65,193	31.89	52,792	25.25
Centrist Reform Alliance	Hiranao Honda	26,573	13.00	28,041	13.41
Sanseito	Akitsuna Tatsuoka	14,949	7.31	13,935	6.67
Democratic Party For the People				10,814	5.17
Team Mirai				9,071	4.34
Japanese Communist Party	Terumi Takarai	10,197	4.99	9,019	4.31
Reiwa Shinsengumi	Ai Yahata	10,097	4.94	6,652	3.18
Conservative Party of Japan				6,599	3.16
Tax Cuts Japan and Yukoku Alliance				2,394	1.15
Social Democratic Party				1,056	0.51
Total		204,442	100.00	209,036	100.00
Invalid/blank votes					
Voter turnout			53.54		
Registered voters		394,984		394,984	
Ishin hold					

Osaka 14th district
Party	Candidate	Constituency		Proportional	
Party	Candidate	Votes	%	Votes	%
Nippon Ishin no Kai	Hitoshi Aoyagi	121,049	57.76	75,967	34.09
Liberal Democratic Party	Motoyuki Odachi	58,573	27.95	53,470	23.99
Centrist Reform Alliance				28,651	12.86
Sanseito				14,698	6.60
Japanese Communist Party	Kouichi Naitou	29,935	14.28	12,541	5.63
Democratic Party For the People				11,983	5.38
Team Mirai				10,482	4.70
Conservative Party of Japan				6,104	2.74
Reiwa Shinsengumi				5,343	2.40
Tax Cuts Japan and Yukoku Alliance				2,317	1.04
Social Democratic Party				1,287	0.58
Total		209,557	100.00	222,843	100.00
Invalid/blank votes					
Voter turnout			55.01		
Registered voters		410,475		410,475	
Ishin hold					

Osaka 15th district
Party	Candidate	Constituency		Proportional	
Party	Candidate	Votes	%	Votes	%
Nippon Ishin no Kai	Yasuto Urano	92,248	47.91	68,873	33.88
Liberal Democratic Party	Tomoaki Shimada	73,378	38.11	50,916	25.05
Centrist Reform Alliance				26,453	13.01
Sanseito				12,639	6.22
Japanese Communist Party	Takashi Hirayama	26,929	13.99	11,247	5.53
Democratic Party For the People				10,380	5.11
Team Mirai				8,936	4.40
Conservative Party of Japan				5,452	2.68
Reiwa Shinsengumi				4,788	2.36
Tax Cuts Japan and Yukoku Alliance				2,253	1.11
Social Democratic Party				1,332	0.66
Total		192,555	100.00	203,269	100.00
Invalid/blank votes					
Voter turnout			54.85		
Registered voters		375,445		375,445	
Ishin hold					

Osaka 16th district
Party	Candidate	Constituency		Proportional	
Party	Candidate	Votes	%	Votes	%
Nippon Ishin no Kai	Masaki Kuroda	73,063	41.24	54,790	30.48
Centrist Reform Alliance	Hiroyuki Moriyama	47,844	27.01	27,675	15.40
Liberal Democratic Party	Haruhisa Hada	36,006	20.32	42,880	23.85
Sanseito	Wakako Ikegami	20,249	11.43	12,248	6.81
Democratic Party For the People				11,036	6.14
Team Mirai				10,027	5.58
Japanese Communist Party				8,723	4.85
Conservative Party of Japan				5,366	2.99
Reiwa Shinsengumi				3,936	2.19
Tax Cuts Japan and Yukoku Alliance				1,962	1.09
Social Democratic Party				1,110	0.62
Total		177,162	100.00	179,753	100.00
Invalid/blank votes					
Voter turnout			56.13		
Registered voters		324,169		324,169	
Ishin hold					

Osaka 17th district
Party	Candidate	Constituency		Proportional	
Party	Candidate	Votes	%	Votes	%
Nippon Ishin no Kai	Nobuyuki Baba	78,362	49.00	54,516	32.28
Liberal Democratic Party	Asami Shigi	42,715	26.71	40,077	23.73
Centrist Reform Alliance				24,449	14.47
Sanseito	Kazumi Tomoto	20,464	12.80	11,821	7.00
Democratic Party For the People				9,237	5.47
Japanese Communist Party	Mitsuyoshi Inoue	18,380	11.49	9,059	5.36
Team Mirai				8,189	4.85
Conservative Party of Japan				4,619	2.73
Reiwa Shinsengumi				4,160	2.46
Tax Cuts Japan and Yukoku Alliance				1,688	1.00
Social Democratic Party				1,094	0.65
Total		159,921	100.00	168,909	100.00
Invalid/blank votes					
Voter turnout			53.44		
Registered voters		319,656		319,656	
Ishin hold					

Osaka 18th district
Party	Candidate	Constituency		Proportional	
Party	Candidate	Votes	%	Votes	%
Nippon Ishin no Kai	Takashi Endo	121,948	58.42	73,071	32.98
Liberal Democratic Party	Takatsugu Uchida	58,889	28.21	57,043	25.74
Centrist Reform Alliance				27,868	12.58
Sanseito				15,492	6.99
Democratic Party For the People				12,237	5.52
Japanese Communist Party	Hideki Baba	27,906	13.37	11,297	5.10
Team Mirai				9,923	4.48
Conservative Party of Japan				5,855	2.64
Reiwa Shinsengumi				5,267	2.38
Tax Cuts Japan and Yukoku Alliance				2,367	1.07
Social Democratic Party				1,159	0.52
Total		208,743	100.00	221,579	100.00
Invalid/blank votes					
Voter turnout			52.90		
Registered voters		424,263		424,263	
Ishin hold					

Osaka 19th district
Party	Candidate	Constituency		Proportional	
Party	Candidate	Votes	%	Votes	%
Liberal Democratic Party	Tomu Tanigawa	58,410	36.91	43,496	27.34
Nippon Ishin no Kai	Nobuhisa Ito	57,697	36.46	53,118	33.39
Centrist Reform Alliance	Masayo Kobane	20,031	12.66	20,378	12.81
Sanseito	Yoshinori Matsuoka	13,399	8.47	11,174	7.02
Democratic Party For the People				7,909	4.97
Team Mirai				6,613	4.16
Japanese Communist Party	Miki Kitamura	8,703	5.50	6,111	3.84
Conservative Party of Japan				4,265	2.68
Reiwa Shinsengumi				3,558	2.24
Tax Cuts Japan and Yukoku Alliance				1,610	1.01
Social Democratic Party				832	0.52
Total		158,240	100.00	159,064	100.00
Invalid/blank votes					
Voter turnout			54.69		
Registered voters		295,056		295,056	
LDP gain from Ishin					

=== Hyogo Prefecture ===
Hyogo Prefecture
Party	Constituency			Proportional	
Party	Votes	%	Seats	Votes	%
Liberal Democratic Party	1,035,513	42.62	11	834,997	33.85
Nippon Ishin no Kai	546,706	22.50	1	440,016	17.84
Centrist Reform Alliance	444,043	18.27	0	396,411	16.07
Democratic Party For the People	58,077	2.39	0	174,564	7.08
Sanseito	133,359	5.49	0	173,131	7.02
Team Mirai				156,959	6.36
Japanese Communist Party	147,422	6.07	0	103,389	4.19
Conservative Party of Japan				69,874	2.83
Reiwa Shinsengumi				65,524	2.66
Tax Cuts Japan and Yukoku Alliance				28,502	1.16
Social Democratic Party				23,182	0.94
Independents	41,929	1.73	0		
Other parties	12,530	0.52	0		
Total	2,429,789	100.00	12	2,466,549	100.00
Invalid/blank votes					
Voter turnout					
Registered voters					

Hyogo 1st district
Party	Candidate	Constituency		Proportional	
Party	Candidate	Votes	%	Votes	%
Liberal Democratic Party	Masahito Moriyama	73,219	33.46	73,132	33.17
Centrist Reform Alliance	Nobuhiko Isaka	69,111	31.58	32,339	14.67
Nippon Ishin no Kai	Yuichiro Ichitani	44,364	20.27	37,038	16.80
Team Mirai				18,982	8.61
Democratic Party For the People				16,357	7.42
Sanseito	Yasuhiko Hara	20,877	9.54	14,230	6.45
Japanese Communist Party	Hiromi Fujisue	11,283	5.16	10,471	4.75
Conservative Party of Japan				7,366	3.34
Reiwa Shinsengumi				5,393	2.45
Tax Cuts Japan and Yukoku Alliance				2,945	1.34
Social Democratic Party				2,247	1.02
Total		218,854	100.00	220,500	100.00
Invalid/blank votes					
Voter turnout			57.02		
Registered voters		390,435		390,435	
LDP gain from CRA					

Hyogo 2nd district
Party	Candidate	Constituency		Proportional	
Party	Candidate	Votes	%	Votes	%
Liberal Democratic Party				61,564	32.69
Nippon Ishin no Kai	Keishi Abe	82,982	45.01	31,427	16.69
Centrist Reform Alliance	Jiro Funakawa	46,308	25.12	35,245	18.71
Independent	Yasunaga Bo	41,929	22.74		
Democratic Party For the People				12,634	6.71
Sanseito				12,297	6.53
Team Mirai				11,254	5.98
Japanese Communist Party	Hiroki Imura	13,141	7.13	9,316	4.95
Conservative Party of Japan				5,520	2.93
Reiwa Shinsengumi				5,122	2.72
Tax Cuts Japan and Yukoku Alliance				2,221	1.18
Social Democratic Party				1,741	0.92
Total		184,360	100.00	188,341	100.00
Invalid/blank votes					
Voter turnout			50.66		
Registered voters		375,717		375,717	
Ishin gain from CRA					

Hyogo 3rd district
Party	Candidate	Constituency		Proportional	
Party	Candidate	Votes	%	Votes	%
Liberal Democratic Party	Yoshihiro Seki	74,806	46.90	53,193	32.28
Nippon Ishin no Kai	Yuichiro Wada	34,272	21.48	27,693	16.81
Centrist Reform Alliance				26,322	15.97
Democratic Party For the People	Koichi Mukoyama	34,177	21.43	14,725	8.94
Team Mirai				11,066	6.72
Sanseito				10,421	6.32
Japanese Communist Party	Kenji Kato	16,262	10.19	8,577	5.20
Conservative Party of Japan				4,860	2.95
Reiwa Shinsengumi				4,278	2.60
Tax Cuts Japan and Yukoku Alliance				1,945	1.18
Social Democratic Party				1,708	1.04
Total		159,517	100.00	164,788	100.00
Invalid/blank votes					
Voter turnout			54.81		
Registered voters		303,830		303,830	
LDP hold					

Hyogo 4th district
Party	Candidate	Constituency		Proportional	
Party	Candidate	Votes	%	Votes	%
Liberal Democratic Party	Hisayuki Fujii	147,544	69.33	80,319	36.83
Centrist Reform Alliance	Takashi Nakayama	49,187	23.11	37,034	16.98
Nippon Ishin no Kai				33,170	15.21
Sanseito				15,381	7.05
Democratic Party For the People				14,793	6.78
Team Mirai				12,511	5.74
Japanese Communist Party	Yuko Hibi	16,081	7.56	8,702	3.99
Reiwa Shinsengumi				5,885	2.70
Conservative Party of Japan				5,853	2.68
Tax Cuts Japan and Yukoku Alliance				2,382	1.09
Social Democratic Party				2,071	0.95
Total		212,812	100.00	218,101	100.00
Invalid/blank votes					
Voter turnout			54.46		
Registered voters		405,203		405,203	
LDP hold					

Hyogo 5th district
Party	Candidate	Constituency		Proportional	
Party	Candidate	Votes	%	Votes	%
Liberal Democratic Party	Koichi Tani	93,501	44.56	76,440	36.21
Nippon Ishin no Kai	Ryota Endo	54,784	26.11	37,113	17.58
Centrist Reform Alliance	Yasushi Kawato	38,936	18.56	36,655	17.36
Democratic Party For the People				13,398	6.35
Sanseito				13,205	6.26
Other	Hideaki Takahashi	12,530	5.97		
Team Mirai				11,238	5.32
Japanese Communist Party	Mineo Muraoka	10,090	4.81	8,631	4.09
Reiwa Shinsengumi				5,332	2.53
Conservative Party of Japan				4,702	2.23
Tax Cuts Japan and Yukoku Alliance				2,294	1.09
Social Democratic Party				2,097	0.99
Total		209,841	100.00	211,105	100.00
Invalid/blank votes					
Voter turnout			58.76		
Registered voters		364,315		364,315	
LDP hold					

Hyogo 6th district
Party	Candidate	Constituency		Proportional	
Party	Candidate	Votes	%	Votes	%
Liberal Democratic Party	Masaki Ogushi	91,440	36.40	80,089	31.70
Nippon Ishin no Kai	Koichiro Ichimura	63,444	25.26	50,579	20.02
Centrist Reform Alliance	Shu Sakurai	58,565	23.31	39,363	15.58
Sanseito	Koichiro Tani	26,935	10.72	18,340	7.26
Team Mirai				17,791	7.04
Democratic Party For the People				17,310	6.85
Japanese Communist Party	Akihiko Yoshimi	10,809	4.30	9,812	3.88
Conservative Party of Japan				7,277	2.88
Reiwa Shinsengumi				6,460	2.56
Tax Cuts Japan and Yukoku Alliance				2,887	1.14
Social Democratic Party				2,742	1.09
Total		251,193	100.00	252,650	100.00
Invalid/blank votes					
Voter turnout			57.62		
Registered voters		442,652		442,652	
LDP gain from CRA					

Hyogo 7th district
Party	Candidate	Constituency		Proportional	
Party	Candidate	Votes	%	Votes	%
Liberal Democratic Party	Kenji Yamada	112,151	42.39	82,595	30.97
Nippon Ishin no Kai	Kei Miki	71,220	26.92	55,833	20.94
Centrist Reform Alliance	Satoru Okada	46,563	17.60	35,378	13.27
Team Mirai				23,052	8.64
Democratic Party For the People				19,745	7.40
Sanseito	Ryo Sakai	20,779	7.85	17,379	6.52
Japanese Communist Party	Sadao Hirano	13,830	5.23	11,282	4.23
Conservative Party of Japan				8,657	3.25
Reiwa Shinsengumi				6,618	2.48
Tax Cuts Japan and Yukoku Alliance				3,311	1.24
Social Democratic Party				2,817	1.06
Total		264,543	100.00	266,667	100.00
Invalid/blank votes					
Voter turnout			60.99		
Registered voters		441,174		441,174	
LDP hold					

Hyogo 8th district
Party	Candidate	Constituency		Proportional	
Party	Candidate	Votes	%	Votes	%
Liberal Democratic Party	Shigeharu Aoyama	85,970	43.31	55,851	27.84
Nippon Ishin no Kai	Junko Tokuyasu	48,094	24.23	41,880	20.88
Centrist Reform Alliance	Yoshie Hirokawa	42,989	21.66	36,027	17.96
Sanseito				13,621	6.79
Democratic Party For the People				13,176	6.57
Team Mirai				12,519	6.24
Japanese Communist Party	Masae Bando	11,252	5.67	10,244	5.11
Reiwa Shinsengumi	Uiko Hasegawa	10,210	5.14	6,716	3.35
Conservative Party of Japan				6,583	3.28
Tax Cuts Japan and Yukoku Alliance				2,331	1.16
Social Democratic Party				1,668	0.83
Total		198,515	100.00	200,616	100.00
Invalid/blank votes					
Voter turnout			52.93		
Registered voters		382,841		382,841	
LDP gain from CRA					

Hyogo 9th district
Party	Candidate	Constituency		Proportional	
Party	Candidate	Votes	%	Votes	%
Liberal Democratic Party	Yasutoshi Nishimura	116,526	58.26	74,653	37.08
Centrist Reform Alliance	Keigo Hashimoto	54,607	27.30	32,904	16.34
Nippon Ishin no Kai				28,978	14.39
Sanseito	Takahito Yamadera	21,087	10.54	15,733	7.81
Democratic Party For the People				14,749	7.33
Team Mirai				11,489	5.71
Japanese Communist Party	Kazutaka Ito	7,787	3.89	7,723	3.84
Reiwa Shinsengumi				5,541	2.75
Conservative Party of Japan				5,475	2.72
Tax Cuts Japan and Yukoku Alliance				2,350	1.17
Social Democratic Party				1,744	0.87
Total		200,007	100.00	201,339	100.00
Invalid/blank votes					
Voter turnout			57.02		
Registered voters		358,092		358,092	
LDP hold					

Hyogo 10th district
Party	Candidate	Constituency		Proportional	
Party	Candidate	Votes	%	Votes	%
Liberal Democratic Party	Kisaburo Tokai	75,309	41.05	64,502	35.00
Nippon Ishin no Kai	Kenji Horii	37,907	20.66	30,258	16.42
Centrist Reform Alliance	Keiko Oki	37,777	20.59	31,977	17.35
Sanseito	Seiya Fujiwara	25,244	13.76	15,758	8.55
Democratic Party For the People				12,613	6.84
Team Mirai				9,778	5.31
Japanese Communist Party	Fumiyo Okuda	7,240	3.95	6,280	3.41
Reiwa Shinsengumi				4,905	2.66
Conservative Party of Japan				4,682	2.54
Tax Cuts Japan and Yukoku Alliance				1,942	1.05
Social Democratic Party				1,594	0.86
Total		183,477	100.00	184,289	100.00
Invalid/blank votes					
Voter turnout			54.81		
Registered voters		340,488		340,488	
LDP hold					

Hyogo 11th district
Party	Candidate	Constituency		Proportional	
Party	Candidate	Votes	%	Votes	%
Liberal Democratic Party	Takeaki Matsumoto	86,090	43.50	74,076	36.34
Nippon Ishin no Kai	Hiroki Sumiyoshi	55,757	28.17	37,119	18.21
Centrist Reform Alliance				28,710	14.09
Sanseito	Satoshi Yamashita	18,437	9.32	16,281	7.99
Democratic Party For the People	Tatsuki Nakahara	23,900	12.08	15,771	7.74
Team Mirai				10,761	5.28
Japanese Communist Party	Kazushige Nigauri	13,712	6.93	6,594	3.24
Conservative Party of Japan				5,715	2.80
Reiwa Shinsengumi				5,029	2.47
Tax Cuts Japan and Yukoku Alliance				2,330	1.14
Social Democratic Party				1,436	0.70
Total		197,896	100.00	203,822	100.00
Invalid/blank votes					
Voter turnout			52.38		
Registered voters		393,587		393,587	
LDP hold					

Hyogo 12th district
Party	Candidate	Constituency		Proportional	
Party	Candidate	Votes	%	Votes	%
Liberal Democratic Party	Tsuyoshi Yamaguchi	78,957	53.07	58,583	37.96
Nippon Ishin no Kai	Kotaro Ikehata	53,882	36.22	28,928	18.74
Centrist Reform Alliance				24,457	15.85
Sanseito				10,485	6.79
Democratic Party For the People				9,293	6.02
Team Mirai				6,518	4.22
Japanese Communist Party	Kiyoyuki Oota	15,935	10.71	5,757	3.73
Reiwa Shinsengumi				4,245	2.75
Conservative Party of Japan				3,184	2.06
Tax Cuts Japan and Yukoku Alliance				1,564	1.01
Social Democratic Party				1,317	0.85
Total		148,774	100.00	154,331	100.00
Invalid/blank votes					
Voter turnout			58.38		
Registered voters		269,062		269,062	
LDP hold					

=== Nara Prefecture ===
Nara Prefecture
Party	Constituency			Proportional	
Party	Votes	%	Seats	Votes	%
Liberal Democratic Party	445,039	67.44	3	294,009	43.60
Nippon Ishin no Kai	37,067	5.62	0	102,590	15.21
Centrist Reform Alliance	64,325	9.75	0	84,814	12.58
Democratic Party For the People	29,976	4.54	0	53,521	7.94
Sanseito	11,181	1.69	0	35,115	5.21
Team Mirai				33,983	5.04
Japanese Communist Party	60,480	9.16	0	28,304	4.20
Conservative Party of Japan				15,530	2.30
Reiwa Shinsengumi				14,244	2.11
Tax Cuts Japan and Yukoku Alliance				6,787	1.01
Social Democratic Party				5,458	0.81
Independents	11,853	1.80	0		
Total	659,921	100.00	3	674,355	100.00
Invalid/blank votes					
Voter turnout					
Registered voters					

Nara 1st district
Party	Candidate	Constituency		Proportional	
Party	Candidate	Votes	%	Votes	%
Liberal Democratic Party	Shigeki Kobayashi	131,313	53.31	101,379	41.06
Nippon Ishin no Kai				35,886	14.53
Centrist Reform Alliance	Sumio Mabuchi	64,325	26.11	34,572	14.00
Democratic Party For the People	Aoi Sugimoto	29,976	12.17	20,977	8.50
Team Mirai				15,068	6.10
Sanseito	Yoji Kurokawa	11,181	4.54	12,033	4.87
Japanese Communist Party	Kazuhiro Tanigawa	9,541	3.87	11,439	4.63
Conservative Party of Japan				6,005	2.43
Reiwa Shinsengumi				5,018	2.03
Tax Cuts Japan and Yukoku Alliance				2,532	1.03
Social Democratic Party				2,020	0.82
Total		246,336	100.00	246,929	100.00
Invalid/blank votes					
Voter turnout			64.36		
Registered voters		387,379		387,379	
LDP gain from CRA					

Nara 2nd district
Party	Candidate	Constituency		Proportional	
Party	Candidate	Votes	%	Votes	%
Liberal Democratic Party	Sanae Takaichi	193,708	87.01	98,860	43.08
Nippon Ishin no Kai				38,162	16.63
Centrist Reform Alliance				25,716	11.21
Democratic Party For the People				19,052	8.30
Sanseito				12,974	5.65
Team Mirai				10,779	4.70
Japanese Communist Party	Eiko Ikeda	28,921	12.99	9,497	4.14
Conservative Party of Japan				5,294	2.31
Reiwa Shinsengumi				5,026	2.19
Tax Cuts Japan and Yukoku Alliance				2,293	1.00
Social Democratic Party				1,824	0.79
Total		222,629	100.00	229,477	100.00
Invalid/blank votes					
Voter turnout			62.40		
Registered voters		373,535		373,535	
LDP hold					

Nara 3rd district
Party	Candidate	Constituency		Proportional	
Party	Candidate	Votes	%	Votes	%
Liberal Democratic Party	Taido Tanose	120,018	62.85	93,770	47.37
Nippon Ishin no Kai	Daisuke Harayama	37,067	19.41	28,542	14.42
Centrist Reform Alliance				24,526	12.39
Democratic Party For the People				13,492	6.82
Sanseito				10,108	5.11
Team Mirai				8,136	4.11
Japanese Communist Party	Atsushi Oota	22,018	11.53	7,368	3.72
Independent	Hiroaki Yagi	11,868	6.21		
Conservative Party of Japan				4,231	2.14
Reiwa Shinsengumi				4,200	2.12
Tax Cuts Japan and Yukoku Alliance				1,962	0.99
Social Democratic Party				1,614	0.82
Total		190,956	100.00	197,949	100.00
Invalid/blank votes					
Voter turnout			59.40		
Registered voters		338,448		338,448	
LDP hold					

=== Wakayama Prefecture ===
Wakayama Prefecture
Party	Constituency			Proportional	
Party	Votes	%	Seats	Votes	%
Liberal Democratic Party	95,836	23.68	1	166,890	40.10
Centrist Reform Alliance	30,208	7.46	0	63,563	15.27
Nippon Ishin no Kai	19,067	4.71	0	56,265	13.52
Sanseito	20,292	5.01	0	31,782	7.64
Democratic Party For the People	31,352	7.75	0	31,526	7.57
Japanese Communist Party	44,886	11.09	0	20,250	4.87
Team Mirai				18,930	4.55
Reiwa Shinsengumi				11,066	2.66
Conservative Party of Japan				8,881	2.13
Tax Cuts Japan and Yukoku Alliance				4,406	1.06
Social Democratic Party				2,660	0.64
Independents	162,257	40.09	1		
Total	404,693	100.00	2	416,219	100.00
Invalid/blank votes					
Voter turnout					
Registered voters					

Wakayama 1st district
Party	Candidate	Constituency		Proportional	
Party	Candidate	Votes	%	Votes	%
Liberal Democratic Party	Daichi Yamamoto	95,836	46.25	76,783	36.97
Democratic Party For the People	Yumi Hayashi	31,352	15.13	18,747	9.03
Centrist Reform Alliance	Yukiko Kaname	30,208	14.58	32,643	15.72
Sanseito	Masako Hayashimoto	20,292	9.79	17,259	8.31
Nippon Ishin no Kai	Yoshihiro Urahira	19,067	9.20	29,711	14.31
Team Mirai				9,960	4.80
Japanese Communist Party	Hisashi Mae	9,677	4.67	9,243	4.45
Reiwa Shinsengumi				5,314	2.56
Conservative Party of Japan				4,590	2.21
Tax Cuts Japan and Yukoku Alliance				2,245	1.08
Social Democratic Party				1,196	0.58
Other	Takeshi Shoji	795	0.38		
Total		207,227	100.00	207,691	100.00
Invalid/blank votes					
Voter turnout			53.78		
Registered voters		391,509		391,509	
LDP hold					

Wakayama 2nd district
Party	Candidate	Constituency		Proportional	
Party	Candidate	Votes	%	Votes	%
Independent	Hiroshige Sekō	162,257	82.17		
Liberal Democratic Party				90,107	43.21
Centrist Reform Alliance				30,920	14.83
Nippon Ishin no Kai				26,554	12.73
Sanseito				14,523	6.96
Democratic Party For the People				12,779	6.13
Japanese Communist Party	Yoshihiro Hatano	35,209	17.83	11,007	5.28
Team Mirai				8,970	4.30
Reiwa Shinsengumi				5,752	2.76
Conservative Party of Japan				4,291	2.06
Tax Cuts Japan and Yukoku Alliance				2,161	1.04
Social Democratic Party				1,464	0.70
Total		197,466	100.00	208,528	100.00
Invalid/blank votes					
Voter turnout			57.62		
Registered voters		370,660		370,660	
Ind. hold					

== Proportional representation ==
Proportional representation results
Party	Votes	Seats	Rank	Elected member	Constituency	Ratio
LDP	2,842,876 (30.4%)	10	1	Hiroo Kotera		
LDP	2,842,876 (30.4%)	10	2	Masatoshi Ishida		
LDP	2,842,876 (30.4%)	10	3	Mamoru Shigemoto	Kyoto 3rd	91.0%
LDP	2,842,876 (30.4%)	10	3	Naomi Tokashiki	Osaka 7th	89.0%
LDP	2,842,876 (30.4%)	10	3	Koichi Munekiyo	Osaka 13th	84.1%
LDP	2,842,876 (30.4%)	10	3	Keiichiro Korai	Osaka 8th	83.3%
LDP	2,842,876 (30.4%)	10	3	Yasuhide Nakayama	Osaka 4th	81.3%
LDP	2,842,876 (30.4%)	10	3	Tomoaki Shimada	Osaka 15th	79.5%
LDP	2,842,876 (30.4%)	10	3	Junpei Higashida	Osaka 9th	77.5%
LDP	2,842,876 (30.4%)	10	3	Yoji Fujita	Kyoto 2nd	74.6%
Ishin	2,168,635 (23.2%)	7 → 8	1	Daisuke Harayama	Nara 3rd	30.8%
Ishin	2,168,635 (23.2%)	7 → 8	2	Nobuhisa Ito	Osaka 19th	98.7%
Ishin	2,168,635 (23.2%)	7 → 8	2	Koichiro Ichimura	Hyogo 6th	69.3%
Ishin	2,168,635 (23.2%)	7 → 8	2	Kotaro Ikehata	Hyogo 12th	68.2%
Ishin	2,168,635 (23.2%)	7 → 8	2	Hiroki Sumiyoshi	Hyogo 11th	64.7%
Ishin	2,168,635 (23.2%)	7 → 8	2	Kei Miki	Hyogo 7th	63.5%
Ishin	2,168,635 (23.2%)	7 → 8	2	Alex Saito	Shiga 1st	61.8%
Ishin	2,168,635 (23.2%)	7 → 8	2	Yuichiro Ichitani	Hyogo 1st	60.5%
CRA	1,332,752 (14.3%)	4 → 5	1	Kazuyoshi Akaba		
CRA	1,332,752 (14.3%)	4 → 5	2	Hiromasa Nakano		
CRA	1,332,752 (14.3%)	4 → 5	3	Kanae Yamamoto		
CRA	1,332,752 (14.3%)	4 → 5	4	Shinichi Isa		
CRA	1,332,752 (14.3%)	4 → 5	5	Tooru Kunishige		
DPFP	651,785 (7.0%)	2	1	Akinari Kawai	Shiga 1st	50.9%
DPFP	651,785 (7.0%)	2	1	Koichi Mukoyama	Hyogo 3rd	45.6%
Sansei	631,179 (6.8%)	2	1	Masaru Ishikawa	Osaka 7th	34.4%
Sansei	631,179 (6.8%)	2	1	Tani Koichiro	Hyogo 6th	29.4%
Mirai	553,496 (5.9%)	2 → 0 (Note: Forfeited two seats due to lack of eligible candidates. Both candidates failed to surpass the required 10% of votes in their single-member constituency races.)				
JCP	480,188 (5.1%)	1	1	Kotaro Tatsumi		

Liberal Democratic Party 2,842,876 (30.41%) 10 seats
Rank	Candidate	Constituency	Ratio
1	Hiroo Kotera		
2	Masatoshi Ishida		
3	Toshitaka Ōoka	Shiga 1st	Won
3	Kenichiro Ueno	Shiga 2nd	Won
3	Nobuhide Takemura	Shiga 3rd	Won
3	Yasushi Katsume	Kyoto 1st	Won
3	Keiro Kitagami	Kyoto 4th	Won
3	Taro Honda	Kyoto 5th	Won
3	Hiromichi Sonozaki	Kyoto 6th	Won
3	Tomu Tanigawa	Osaka 19th	Won
3	Masahito Moriyama	Hyogo 1st	Won
3	Yoshihiro Seki	Hyogo 3rd	Won
3	Hisayuki Fujii	Hyogo 4th	Won
3	Koichi Tani	Hyogo 5th	Won
3	Masaki Ogushi	Hyogo 6th	Won
3	Kenji Yamada	Hyogo 7th	Won
3	Shigeharu Aoyama	Hyogo 8th	Won
3	Yasutoshi Nishimura	Hyogo 9th	Won
3	Kisaburo Tokai	Hyogo 10th	Won
3	Takeaki Matsumoto	Hyogo 11th	Won
3	Tsuyoshi Yamaguchi	Hyogo 12th	Won
3	Shigeki Kobayashi	Nara 1st	Won
3	Sanae Takaichi	Nara 2nd	Won
3	Taido Tanose	Nara 3rd	Won
3	Daichi Yamamoto	Wakayama 1st	Won
3	Mamoru Shigemoto	Kyoto 3rd	91.0
3	Naomi Tokashiki	Osaka 7th	89.0
3	Koichi Munekiyo	Osaka 13th	84.1
3	Keiichiro Korai	Osaka 8th	83.3
3	Yasuhide Nakayama	Osaka 4th	81.3
3	Tomoaki Shimada	Osaka 15th	79.5
3	Junpei Higashida	Osaka 9th	77.5
3	Yoji Fujita	Kyoto 2nd	74.6
3	Hiroyuki Onishi	Osaka 1st	69.0
3	Akira Yanagimoto	Osaka 3rd	60.5
3	Asami Shigi	Osaka 17th	54.5
3	Mio Sugita	Osaka 5th	51.4
3	Haruhisa Hada	Osaka 16th	49.2
3	Masashi Nagai	Osaka 6th	48.7
3	Motoyuki Odachi	Osaka 14th	48.3
3	Takatsugu Uchida	Osaka 18th	48.2
3	Yonosuke Kono	Osaka 10th	44.4
3	Shinpei Kitakawa	Osaka 12th	42.9
3	Naotaka Matsumoto	Osaka 11th	36.8

Nippon Ishin no Kai 2,168,635 (23.20%) 7 seats (plus 1)
Rank	Candidate	Constituency	Ratio
1	Daisuke Harayama	Nara 3rd	30.8
2	Seiji Maehara	Kyoto 2nd	Won
2	Inoue Hidetaka	Osaka 1st	Won
2	Ryo Takami	Osaka 2nd	Won
2	Toru Azuma	Osaka 3rd	Won
2	Teruo Minobe	Osaka 4th	Won
2	Satoshi Umemura	Osaka 5th	Won
2	Kaoru Nishida	Osaka 6th	Won
2	Takemitsu Okushita	Osaka 7th	Won
2	Joji Uruma	Osaka 8th	Won
2	Kei Hagiwara	Osaka 9th	Won
2	Taku Ikeshita	Osaka 10th	Won
2	Hiroshi Nakatsuka	Osaka 11th	Won
2	Fumitake Fujita	Osaka 12th	Won
2	Ryohei Iwatani	Osaka 13th	Won
2	Hitoshi Aoyagi	Osaka 14th	Won
2	Yasuto Urano	Osaka 15th	Won
2	Masaki Kuroda	Osaka 16th	Won
2	Nobuyuki Baba	Osaka 17th	Won
2	Takashi Endo	Osaka 18th	Won
2	Nobuhisa Ito	Osaka 19th	98.7
2	Koichiro Ichimura	Hyogo 6th	69.3
2	Kotaro Ikehata	Hyogo 12th	68.2
2	Hiroki Sumiyoshi	Hyogo 11th	64.7
2	Kei Miki	Hyogo 7th	63.5
2	Alex Saito	Shiga 1st	61.8
2	Yuichiro Ichitani	Hyogo 1st	60.5
2	Ryota Endo	Hyogo 5th	58.5
2	Junko Tokuyasu	Hyogo 8th	55.9
2	Kenji Horii	Hyogo 10th	50.3
2	Yuichiro Wada	Hyogo 3rd	45.8
2	Motoki Kimura	Kyoto 3rd	40.1
2	Shingo Deji	Shiga 3rd	33.9
2	Takashi Sasaki	Kyoto 1st	33.4
2	Kyosuke Okaya	Shiga 2nd	33.0
2	~~Yoshihiro Urahira~~ (Note: Ineligible for election - failed to surpass the required 10% of votes in their single-member constituency race.)	Wakayama 1st	19.9

Centrist Reform Alliance 1,332,752 (14.26%) 4 seats (plus 1)
Rank	Candidate	Constituency	Ratio
1	Kazuyoshi Akaba		
2	Hiromasa Nakano		
3	Kanae Yamamoto		
4	Shinichi Isa		
5	Tooru Kunishige		
6	Sumio Mabuchi	Nara 1st	48.9
7	Kenta Izumi	Kyoto 3rd	Won
7	Nobuhiko Isaka	Hyogo 1st	94.3
7	Kazunori Yamanoi	Kyoto 6th	74.0
7	Hiroyuki Moriyama	Osaka 16th	65.4
7	Shu Sakurai	Hyogo 6th	64.0
7	Kanako Otsuji	Osaka 10th	58.1
7	Jiro Funakawa	Hyogo 2nd	55.8
7	Keiko Oki	Hyogo 10th	50.1
7	Yoshie Hirokawa	Hyogo 8th	50.0
7	Keigo Hashimoto	Hyogo 9th	46.8
7	Hiromi Sakamoto	Osaka 6th	43.3
7	Shinji Tarutoko	Osaka 12th	42.7
7	Yasushi Kawato	Hyogo 5th	41.6
7	Satoru Okada	Hyogo 7th	41.5
7	Yuuko Utsonomiya	Osaka 3rd	40.7
7	Kozo Hiratake	Kyoto 1st	37.0
7	Yuriko Kono	Kyoto 2nd	36.8
7	Hiranao Honda	Osaka 13th	34.3
7	Masayo Kobane	Osaka 19th	34.2
7	Noriatsu Murakami	Osaka 11th	33.9
7	Takashi Nakayama	Hyogo 4th	33.3
7	Michio Hirao	Shiga 2nd	33.2
7	Yukiko Kaname	Wakayama 1st	31.5
7	Tomoyuki Haya	Shiga 3rd	27.1

Democratic Party For the People 651,785 (6.97%) 2 seats
Rank	Candidate	Constituency	Ratio
1	Akinari Kawai	Shiga 1st	50.9
1	Koichi Mukoyama	Hyogo 3rd	45.6
1	Yumi Hayashi	Wakayama 1st	32.7
1	Tadashi Okamoto	Osaka 4th	32.3
1	Jun Sato	Osaka 8th	31.2
1	Tomoo Shiono	Osaka 1st	29.8
1	Tatsuki Nakahara	Hyogo 11th	27.7
1	Hidemichi Maeda	Osaka 5th	25.6
1	Aoi Sugimoto	Nara 1st	22.8
1	~~Takatoshi Katsura~~	Kyoto 1st	17.5

Sanseito 631,179 (6.75%) 2 seats
Rank	Candidate	Constituency	Ratio
1	Masaru Ishikawa	Osaka 7th	34.4
1	Tani Koichiro	Hyogo 6th	29.4
1	Wakako Ikegami	Osaka 16th	27.7
1	~~Masako Hayashimoto~~	Wakayama 1st	21.2
1	~~Yoji Kurokawa~~	Nara 1st	8.5
6	Ryuta Kuroishi		
7	Aburatani Seiichiro		

Team Mirai 553,496 (5.92%) 2 seats (2 unfilled)
Rank	Candidate	Constituency	Ratio
1	~~Sachiko Horiba~~	Kyoto 1st	22.0
2	~~Yusuke Sakai~~	Kyoto 2nd	22.6

Japanese Communist Party 480,188 (5.14%) 1 seat
Rank	Candidate	Constituency	Ratio
1	Kotaro Tatsumi		
2	Akiko Horikawa	Kyoto 2nd	38.1
3	Tadashi Shimizu		
4	Kaeko Fujitani		

Conservative Party of Japan 259,052 (2.77%) 0 seats
Rank	Candidate	Constituency	Ratio
1	Koichi Shimada		
2	Minori Sasaki		
3	Mitsuaki Fujimura		

Reiwa Shinsengumi 247,048 (2.64%) 0 seats
Rank	Candidate	Constituency	Ratio
1	~~Akiko Ōishi~~	Osaka 5th	21.3
1	~~Ai Yahata~~	Osaka 13th	13.0
1	~~Uiko Hasegawa~~	Hyogo 8th	11.9
4	Minako Saigo		

Tax Cuts Japan and Yukoku Alliance 105,647 (1.13%) 0 seats
Rank	Candidate	Constituency	Ratio
1	Takashi Okuno		

Social Democratic Party 75,014 (0.80%) 0 seats
Rank	Candidate	Constituency	Ratio
1	Keigo Nishio	Osaka 9th	29.8
