= Shinichi Isa =

Japanese politician

- 伊佐 進一
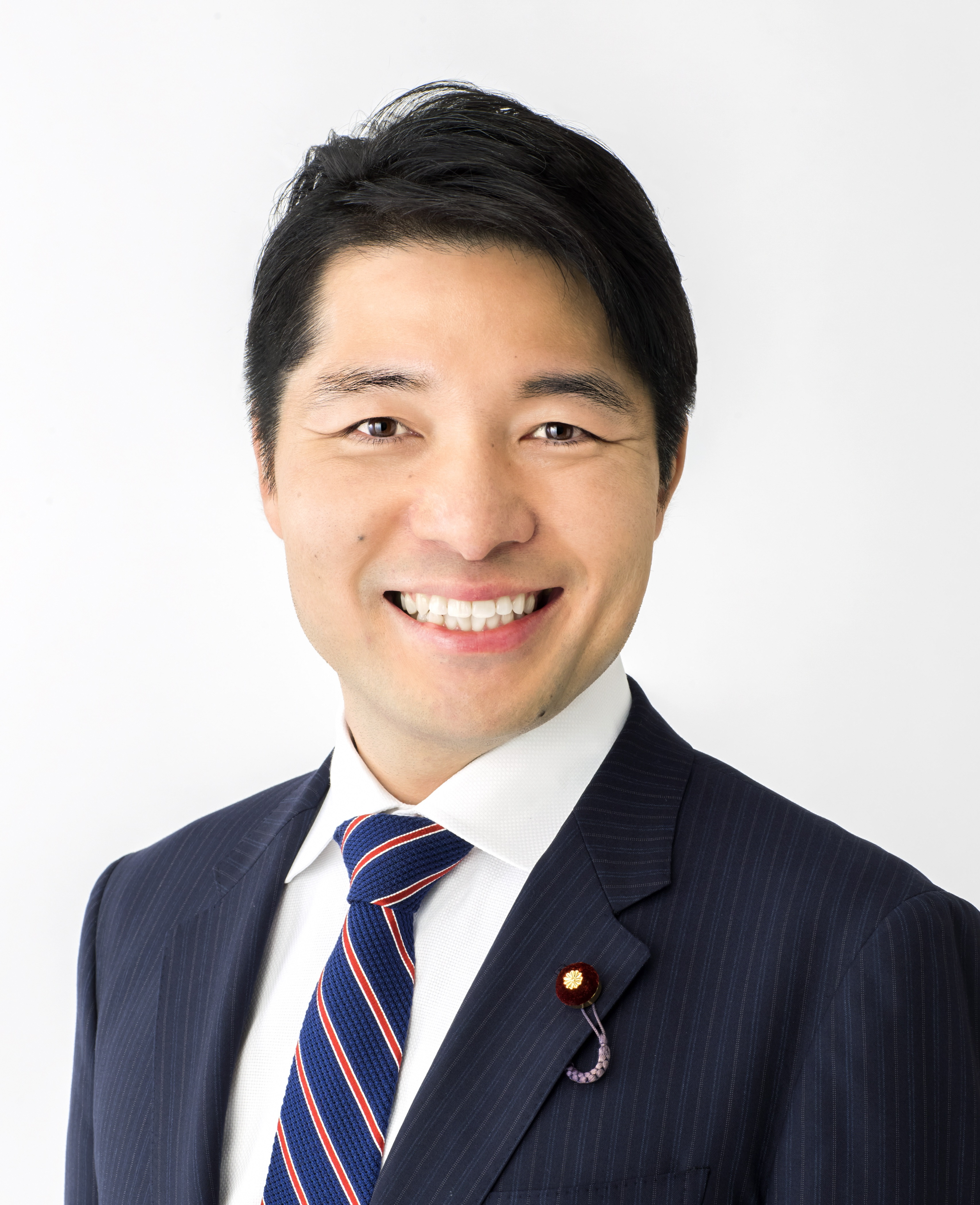
- Official portrait, 2016

Chair of the Centrist Reform Alliance Public Relations Committee
- Incumbent
- Assumed office 18 February 2026
- Preceded by: Office established

Member of the House of Representatives
- Incumbent
- Assumed office 9 February 2026
- Preceded by: Multi-member district
- Constituency: Kansai PR
- In office 17 December 2012 – 9 October 2024
- Preceded by: Fumiyoshi Murakami
- Succeeded by: Kaoru Nishida
- Constituency: Osaka 6th

Personal details
- Born: 10 December 1974 (age 51) Moriguchi, Osaka, Japan
- Party: Komeito (until 2026; since 2026)
- Other political affiliations: CRA (2026)
- Education: University of Tokyo; Johns Hopkins University
- Website: Shinichi Isa website

Shinichi Isa (伊佐 進一, Isa Shinichi; born 10 December 1974) is a Japanese politician of the Centrist Reform Alliance, who serves as a member of the House of Representatives.

== Early years ==
On 10 December 1974, Isa was born in Moriguchi, Osaka. After graduating from University of Tokyo's School of Engineering, he joined the Science and Technology Agency in 1997. He earned his master's degree from the Johns Hopkins University's Paul H. Nitze School of Advanced International Studies (SAIS) in 2003. In 2005, he was appointed as deputy director of the Space Development and Utilization Division within the Research and Development Bureau of the Ministry of Education, Culture, Sports, Science and Technology (MEXT). He then became the First Secretary at the Embassy of Japan in China in 2007. Afterward, following his service as deputy director of the General Affairs Division in the Minister's Secretariat of MEXT, he was appointed as Secretary to the Vice-Minister of MEXT in 2010.

== Political career ==
In the 2012 general election, Isa ran on the Osaka 6th district as Yutaka Fukushima's successor and gained the seat.

In the 2014 general election, he was reelected and secured his second-term.

In the 2017 general election, he was reelected and secured his third-term.

In October 2018, he was appointed as Parliamentary Secretary for Finance in the Fourth Abe first reshuffled cabinet and served until September 2019.

In the 2021 general election, he was reelected and secured his fourth-term.

In August 2022, he was appointed as the State Minister of Health, Labour and Welfare and State Minister of Cabinet Office in the Second Kishida first reshuffled cabinet and served until September 2023.

In the 2024 general election, he lost to Ishin's Kaoru Nishida.

In January 2026, he joined the Centrist Reform Alliance, a new party established by the CDP and Komeito. In the 2026 general election, he won a seat in the PR.

On 18 February 2026, he was appointed as the Chair of the Centrist Reform Alliance (CRA) Public Relations Committee by CRA's new leader Junya Ogawa.
