= Hyōgo 9th district =

Legislative district of Japan

Hyōgo 9th District
- Parliamentary constituency for the Japanese House of Representatives
- Numbered map of Hyōgo Prefecture single-member districts
- Prefecture: Hyōgo
- Proportional District: Kinki
- Electorate: 363,654

Current constituency
- Created: 1994
- Seats: One
- Party: Liberal Democratic
- Representative: Yasutoshi Nishimura
- Municipalities: Akashi, Awaji, Sumoto, and Minamiawaji

Hyōgo 9th district (兵庫県第9区, Hyōgo-ken dai-kyūku or simply 兵庫9区, Hyōgo-kyūku) is a single-member constituency of the House of Representatives, the lower house of the national Diet of Japan.

== List of representatives ==
Election	Representative	Party	Notes
1996	Ichizō Miyamoto	New Frontier	
2000	Ichizō Miyamoto	Liberal Democratic	
2003	Yasutoshi Nishimura	Independent	
2005	Yasutoshi Nishimura	Liberal Democratic	
2009	Yasutoshi Nishimura	Liberal Democratic	
2012	Yasutoshi Nishimura	Liberal Democratic	
2014	Yasutoshi Nishimura	Liberal Democratic	
2017	Yasutoshi Nishimura	Liberal Democratic	
2021	Yasutoshi Nishimura	Liberal Democratic	
2024	Yasutoshi Nishimura	Independent	
2026	Yasutoshi Nishimura	Liberal Democratic	

== Election results ==
2026
Party	Candidate	Votes	%	±%
LDP	Yasutoshi Nishimura	116,526	58.3	▲12.7
Centrist Reform	Keigo Hashimoto	54,607	27.3	▼9.1
Sanseitō	Takahito Yamadera	21,087	10.5	
JCP	Kazutaka Itō	7,787	3.9	▼1.1
Registered electors		358,092		
Turnout			57.02	▲1.57
LDP hold				

2024
Party	Candidate	Votes	%	±%
Independent (endorsed by Komeito and local LDP offices)	Yasutoshi Nishimura (incumbent)	88,676	45.57	▼30.73
CDP	Keigo Hashimoto (endorsed by SDP)	70,738	36.35	New
Innovation	Kiichiro Kako	25,515	13.11	New
Communist	Yoshinobu Takata	9,653	4,96	▼18.74
Majority		17,938	9.22	▼43.32
Registered electors		360,121		
Turnout		194,582	55.45	▲2.22

2021
Party	Candidate	Votes	%	±%
Liberal Democratic	Yasutoshi Nishimura (Incumbent)	141,973	76.27	▲6.72
Communist	Yukari Fukuhara	44,172	23.73	▼1.51
Registered electors		363,347		
Turnout			53.23	▲4.06
LDP hold				

2017
Party	Candidate	Votes	%	±%
Liberal Democratic	Yasutoshi Nishimura (Incumbent)	122,026	69.55	▼5.21
Kibō no Tō	Yasushi Kawato	30,937	17.63	New
Independent	Noriyuki Kikuchi	22,497	12.82	New
Registered electors		365,836		
Turnout			49.17	▼0.41
LDP hold				

2014
Party	Candidate	Votes	%	±%
Liberal Democratic	Yasutoshi Nishimura (Incumbent)	126,491	74.76	▲15.38
Communist	Michiyo Shinmachi	42,694	25.24	▲17.17
Registered electors		358,073		
Turnout			49.58	▼8.31
LDP hold				

2012
Party	Candidate	Votes	%	±%
Liberal Democratic	Yasutoshi Nishimura (Incumbent)	120,590	59.38	▼1.27
Restoration	Shunji Tani	45,097	22.20	New
Democratic	Hiroshi Hamamoto	21,016	10.35	▼15.94
Communist	Michiyo Shinmachi	16,393	8.07	▲1.87
Turnout			57.89	▼7.35
LDP hold				

2009
Party	Candidate	Votes	%	±%
Liberal Democratic	Yasutoshi Nishimura (Incumbent)	137,190	60.65	▲2.37
People's New	Ichizō Miyamoto	76,991	34.03	New
Happiness Realization	Yoshiaki Takagi	12,033	5.32	New
Turnout			65.24	
LDP hold				

2005
Party	Candidate	Votes	%	±%
Liberal Democratic	Yasutoshi Nishimura (Incumbent)	136,605	58.28	▲27.46
Democratic	Mitsunari Hatanaka	61,617	26.29	▲3.94
New Party Nippon	Ichizō Miyamoto	21,647	9.23	New
Communist	Tetsuo Ōsugi	14,539	6.20	▲0.22
Turnout				
LDP hold				

2003
Party	Candidate	Votes	%	±%
Independent	Yasutoshi Nishimura	86,631	40.84	▲10.19
Liberal Democratic	Ichizō Miyamoto (Incumbent)	65,374	30.82	▼2.43
Democratic	Mitsunari Hatanaka	47,406	22.35	▼1.68
Communist	Naoki Kakei	12,694	5.98	▼4.90
Turnout				
Independent gain from LDP				

2000
Party	Candidate	Votes	%	±%
Liberal Democratic	Ichizō Miyamoto (Incumbent)	70,119	33.25	▼1.10
Independent	Yasutoshi Nishimura	64,630	30.65	New
Democratic	Kinzō Fujimoto	50,677	24.03	New
Communist	Yukimi Ichikawa	22,946	10.88	▼1.81
Liberal League	Shūichi Ashimura	2,502	1.19	New
Turnout				
LDP hold				

1996
Party	Candidate	Votes	%	±%
New Frontier	Ichizō Miyamoto	75,274	38.41	New
Liberal Democratic	Kenzaburo Hara (elected by Kinki PR block)	67,329	34.35	New
Democratic	Kiyoshi Wakamiya	28,515	14.55	New
Communist	Susumu Ishii	24,865	12.69	New
Turnout				
