= Nobuhide Takemura =

Japanese politician (born 1972)

- 武村 展英
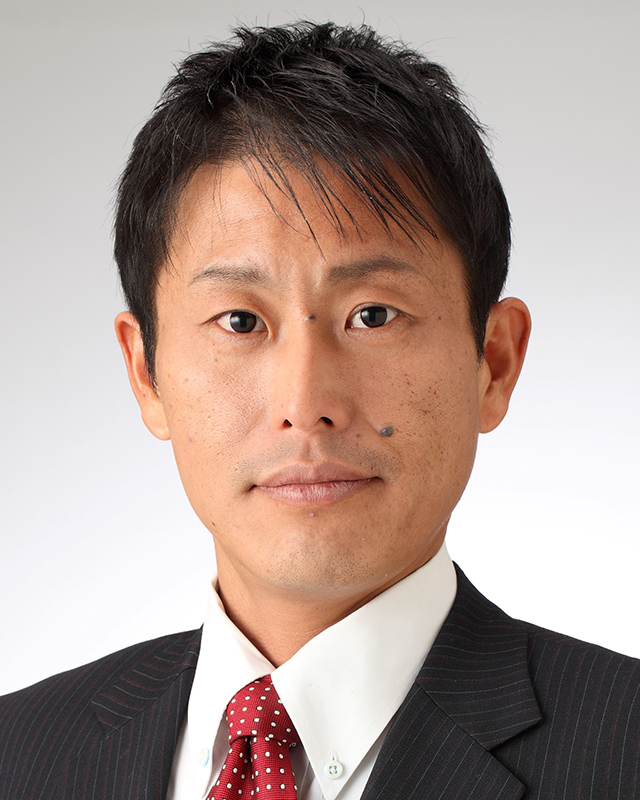
- Official portrait, 2012

Member of the House of Representatives
- Incumbent
- Assumed office 19 December 2012
- Preceded by: Taizō Mikazuki
- Constituency: Shiga 3rd

Personal details
- Born: 21 January 1972 (age 54) Kusatsu, Shiga, Japan
- Party: Liberal Democratic
- Education: Keio University

Nobuhide Takemura (武村展英, Takemura Nobuhide; born 21 January 1972) is a Japanese politician serving as a member of the House of Representatives since 2012. From 2003 to 2010, he worked as a Certified Public Accountant at Ernst & Young ShinNihon.
