= Yuko Kitano =

Japanese politician (born 1985)

- 北野 裕子
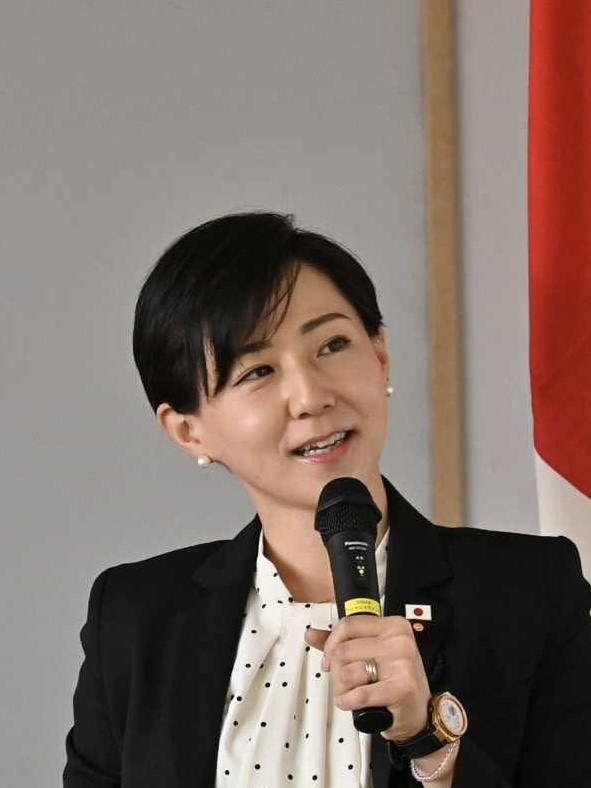
- Kitano in 2025

Member of the House of Representatives
- In office 1 November 2024 – 23 January 2026
- Constituency: Kinki PR

Personal details
- Born: 19 September 1985 (age 41) Kyoto, Japan
- Party: Sanseitō
- Education: Kyoto Koka Women's University

Yuko Kitano (北野裕子, Kitano Yuko; born 19 September 1985) is a Japanese politician who served as a member of the House of Representatives from 2024 to 2026. She is the chairwoman of Sanseitō in Shiga Prefecture.
