= Osaka 6th district =

- Parliamentary constituency for the Japanese House of Representatives
- Numbered map of the Osaka city single seats
- Prefecture: Osaka
- Proportional District: Kinki
- Electorate: 386,047

Current constituency
- Created: 1994
- Seats: One
- Party: Ishin
- Representative: Kaoru Nishida
- Municipalities: Asahi-ku and Tsurumi-ku of Osaka, Kadoma, and Moriguchi.

Osaka 6th district (大阪府第6区, Osaka-fu dai-rokku or simply 大阪6区, Osaka-rokku ) is a single-member constituency of the House of Representatives in the national Diet of Japan located in Osaka Prefecture.

== Areas covered ==
=== Since 1994 ===
- Part of Osaka
  - Asahi-ku
  - Tsurumi-ku
- Kadoma
- Moriguchi

== List of representatives ==
Election	Representative	Party	Notes
1996	Yutaka Fukushima	New Frontier	
2000	Yutaka Fukushima	Komeito	
2003	Yutaka Fukushima	Komeito	
2005	Yutaka Fukushima	Komeito	
2009	Fumiyoshi Murakami	Democratic	
2009	Fumiyoshi Murakami	PLF	
2009	Fumiyoshi Murakami	Tomorrow	
2012	Shinichi Isa	Komeito	
2014	Shinichi Isa	Komeito	
2017	Shinichi Isa	Komeito	
2021	Shinichi Isa	Komeito	
2024	Kaoru Nishida	Ishin	
2026	Kaoru Nishida	Ishin	

== Election results ==
=== 2026 ===
2026
Party	Candidate	Votes	%	±%
Ishin	Kaoru Nishida	87,431	42.6	▲3.2
LDP	Masashi Nagai	42,619	20.7	
Centrist Reform	Hiromi Sakamoto	37,890	18.4	▲8.4
Sanseitō	Maiko Tsukiashi	24,635	12.0	▲4.4
JCP	Atsushi Kamei	12,899	6.3	▼1.9
Registered electors		384,311		
Turnout			54.84	▲2.15
Ishin hold				

=== 2024 ===
2024
Party	Candidate	Votes	%	±%
Ishin	Kaoru Nishida	77,905	39.33	New
Komeito	Shinichi Isa	69,058	34.87	
CDP	Yoko Fukutome	19,877	10.04	
JCP	Koichi Watashi	16,205	8.18	N/A
Sanseitō	Maiko Tsukiashi	15,016	7.58	New
Majority		8,847	4.46	
Registered electors		385,768		
Turnout			52.69	▼1.58
Ishin gain from Komeito				

=== 2021 ===
2021
Party	Candidate	Votes	%	±%
Komeito	Shinichi Isa	106,878	54.82	
CDP	Fumiyoshi Murakami	59,191	30.36	New
Independent	Kentaro Hoshi	28,895	14.82	New
Majority		47,687	24.46	
Registered electors		391,045		
Turnout			54.27	▲7.04
Komeito hold				

=== 2017 ===
2017
Party	Candidate	Votes	%	±%
Komeito	Shinichi Isa	104,052	61.00	
CDP	Fumiyoshi Murakami (Won PR seat)	66,536	39.00	New
Majority		37,516	22.00	
Registered electors		393,255		
Turnout			47.23	▼1.89
Komeito hold				

=== 2014 ===
2014
Party	Candidate	Votes	%	±%
Komeito	Shinichi Isa	94,308	56.35	
JCP	Koichi Watashi	42,265	25.25	
People's Life	Fumiyoshi Murakami	30,792	18.40	New
Majority		52,043	31.10	
Registered electors		384,725		
Turnout			49.12	
Komeito hold				

=== 2012 ===
2012
Party	Candidate	Votes	%	±%
Komeito	Shinichi Isa	116,855	59.56	
Tomorrow	Fumiyoshi Murakami (Won PR seat)	44,565	22.71	New
JCP	Yōko Kitahara	34,783	17.73	
Majority		72,290	36.85	
Registered electors				
Turnout				
Komeito gain from Tomorrow				

=== 2009 ===
2009
Party	Candidate	Votes	%	±%
Democratic	Fumiyoshi Murakami	109,143	43.30	
Komeito	Yutaka Fukushima	107,336	42.58	
JCP	Hiroyuki Yano	26,490	10.51	
Happiness Realization	Tomoko Uesugi	9,087	3.61	New
Majority		1,807	0.72	
Registered electors				
Turnout				
Democratic gain from Komeito				

=== 2005 ===
2005
Party	Candidate	Votes	%	±%
Komeito	Yutaka Fukushima	127,157	52.70	
Democratic	Fumiyoshi Murakami	84,562	35.05	
JCP	Junji Iguchi	29,543	12.25	
Majority		42,595	17.65	
Registered electors				
Turnout				
Komeito hold				

=== 2003 ===
2003
Party	Candidate	Votes	%	±%
Komeito	Yutaka Fukushima	101,292	49.37	
Democratic	Fumiyoshi Murakami	75,098	36.60	New
JCP	Otomi Ōta	28,789	14.03	
Majority		26,194	12.77	
Registered electors				
Turnout				
Komeito hold				

=== 2000 ===
2000
Party	Candidate	Votes	%	±%
Komeito	Yutaka Fukushima	96,432	49.69	New
JCP	Takashi Yanagase	66,268	34.15	
Liberal League	Hiroyuki Ikeda	31,354	16.16	
Majority		30,164	15.54	
Registered electors				
Turnout				
Komeito hold				

=== 1996 ===
1996
Party	Candidate	Votes	%	±%
New Frontier	Yutaka Fukushima	85,173	41.51	New
LDP	Keiichiro Konishi	48,985	23.87	New
JCP	Takashi Yanagase	39,440	19.22	New
Democratic	Motoyuki Fujikawa	28,413	13.85	New
Liberal League	Seiji Harada	3,167	1.54	New
Majority		36,188	17.64	
Registered electors				
Turnout				
New Frontier win (new seat)				
