= Kenji Yamada (politician) =

Japanese politician (born 1966)

- 山田 賢司
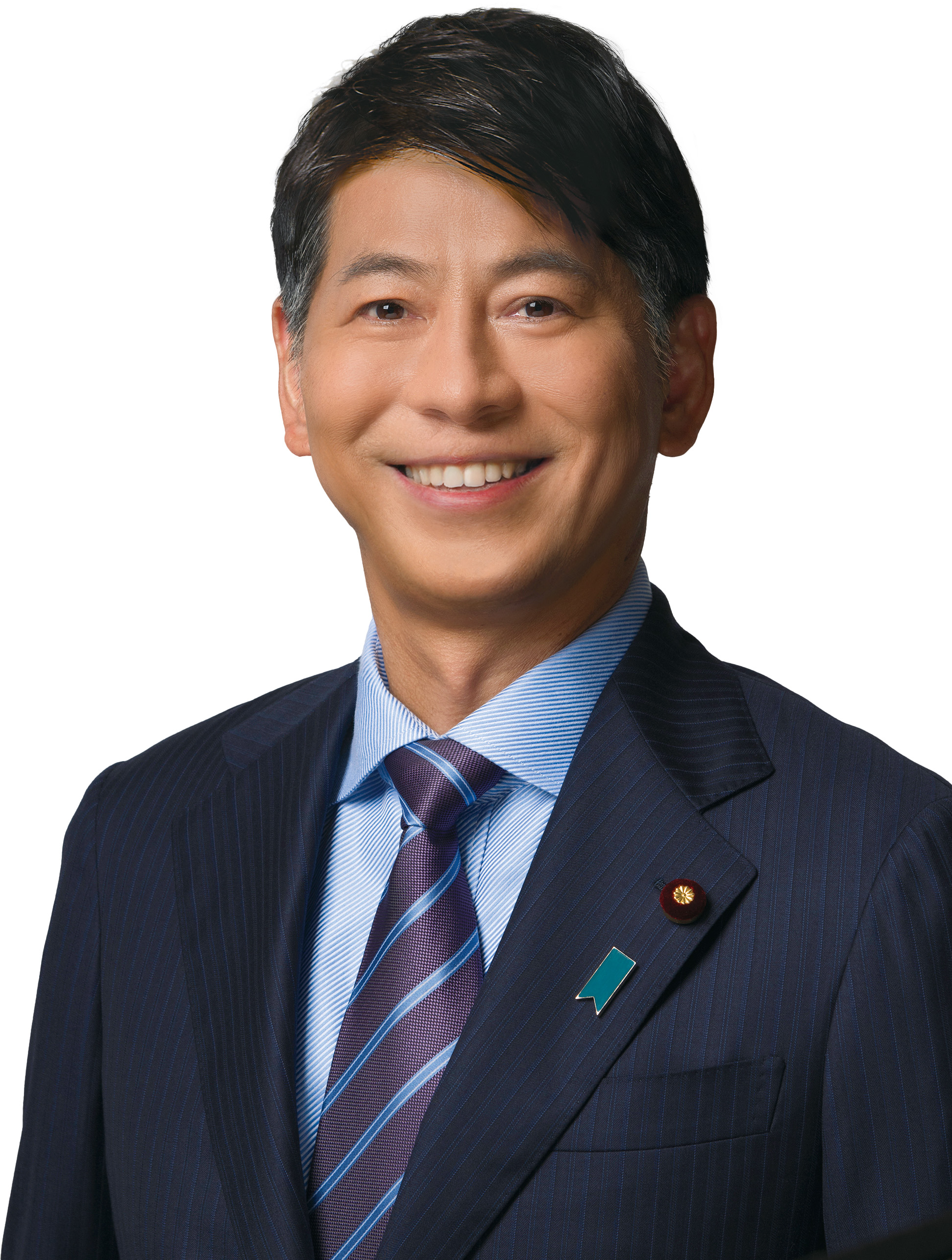
- Official portrait, 2012

Member of the House of Representatives
- Incumbent
- Assumed office 18 December 2012
- Preceded by: Toshirō Ishii
- Constituency: Hyōgo 7th

Personal details
- Born: 20 April 1966 (age 60) Osaka Prefecture, Japan
- Party: Liberal Democratic (Shikōkai)
- Education: Kobe University

Kenji Yamada (山田賢司, Yamada Kenji; born 20 April 1966) is a Japanese politician serving as a member of the House of Representatives since 2012. Yamada is a deputy secretary-general of the Liberal Democratic Party.
