= Yasutoshi Nishimura =

Japanese politician

- 西村 康稔
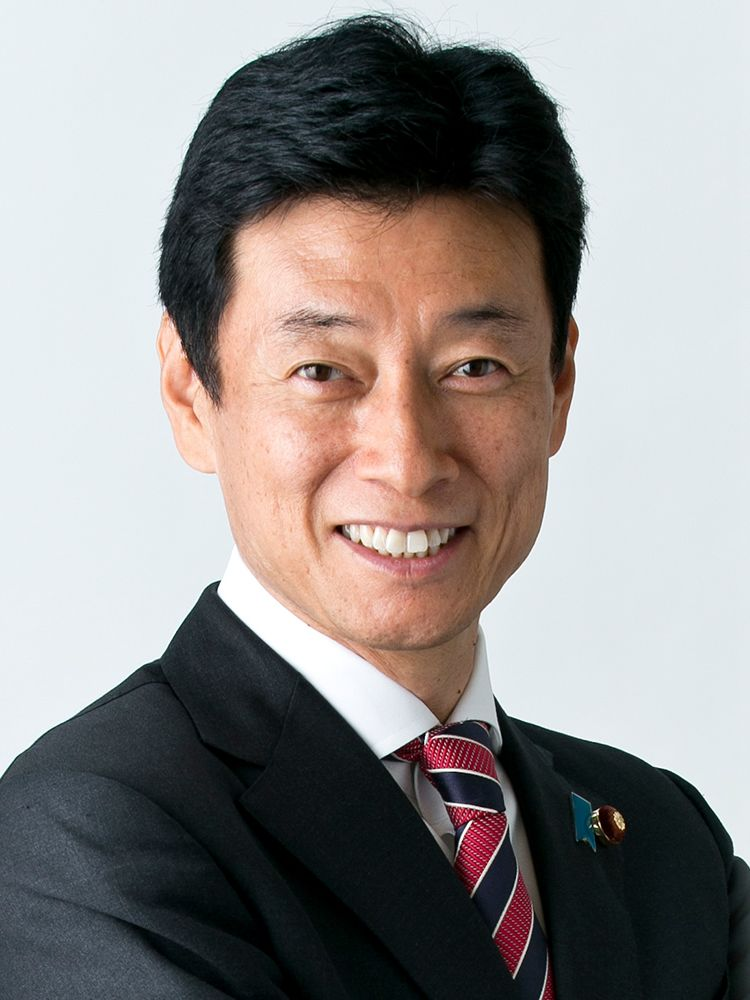
- Official portrait, 2019

Minister of Economy, Trade and Industry
- In office 10 August 2022 – 14 December 2023
- Prime Minister: Fumio Kishida
- Preceded by: Koichi Hagiuda
- Succeeded by: Ken Saito

Minister of State for Economic and Fiscal Policy
- In office 11 September 2019 – 4 October 2021
- Prime Minister: Shinzo Abe; Yoshihide Suga
- Preceded by: Toshimitsu Motegi
- Succeeded by: Daishiro Yamagiwa

Deputy Chief Cabinet Secretary (Political affairs, House of Representatives)
- In office 3 August 2017 – 11 September 2019
- Prime Minister: Shinzo Abe
- Preceded by: Kōichi Hagiuda
- Succeeded by: Akihiro Nishimura

Member of the House of Representatives
- Incumbent
- Assumed office 10 November 2003
- Preceded by: Ichizō Miyamoto
- Constituency: Hyōgo 9th

Personal details
- Born: 15 October 1962 (age 63) Akashi, Hyōgo, Japan
- Party: Liberal Democratic
- Education: University of Tokyo

Yasutoshi Nishimura (西村 康稔, Nishimura Yasutoshi; born 15 October 1962) is a Japanese politician who serves as chairman of the Liberal Democratic Party (LDP) Election Strategy Committee since 2026. He was previously Minister of Economy, Trade and Industry from 2022 to 2023 and as Minister of State for Economic and Fiscal Policy from 2019 to 2021. He has been a member of the House of Representatives since 2003, representing Hyogo 9th district.

Nishimura resigned from his cabinet posts in December 2023 amid allegations of a slush fund involving himself and several other ministers and members of the LDP.

== Early life and career ==
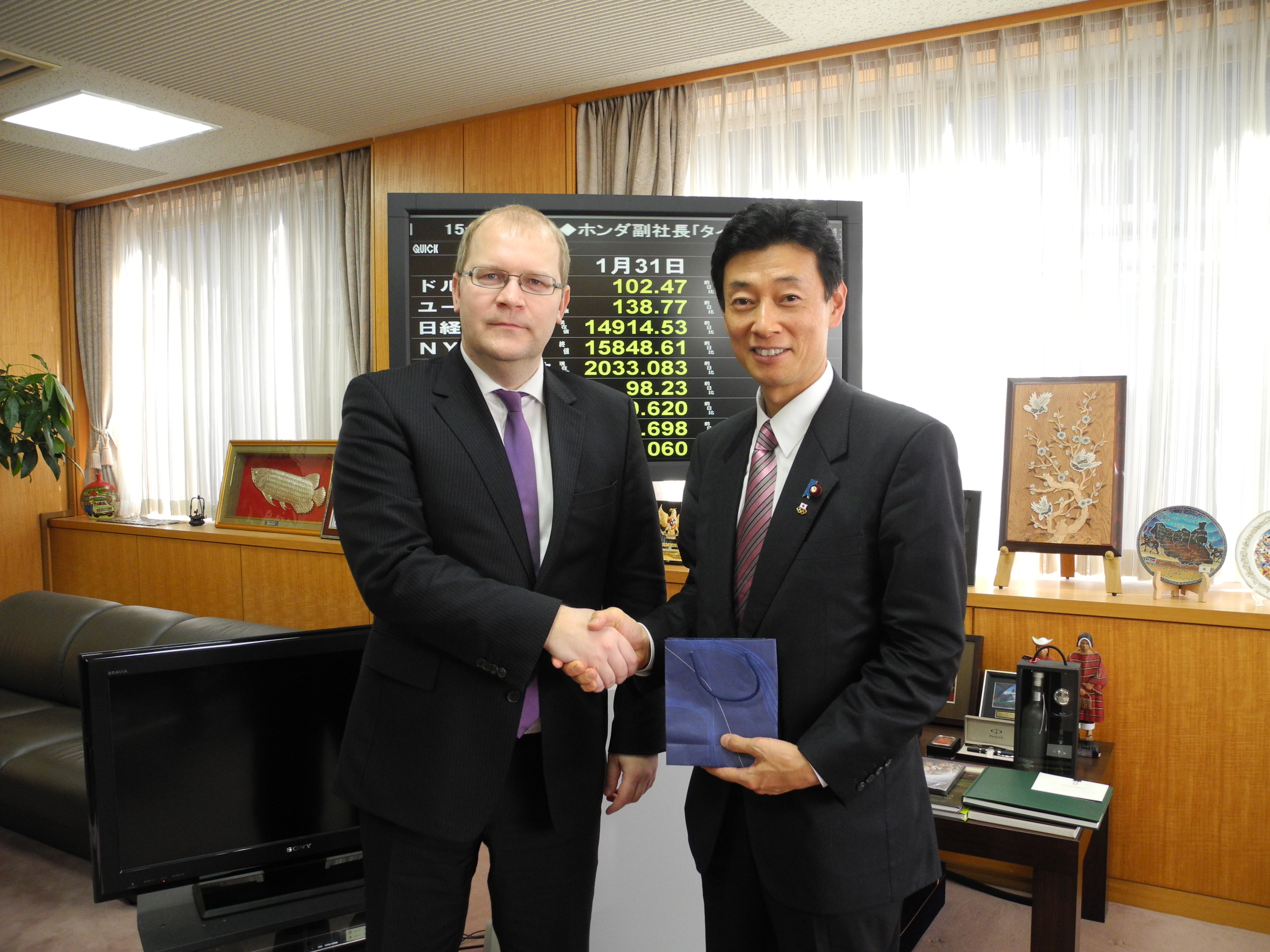
Nishimura with Urmas Paet (31 January 2014)

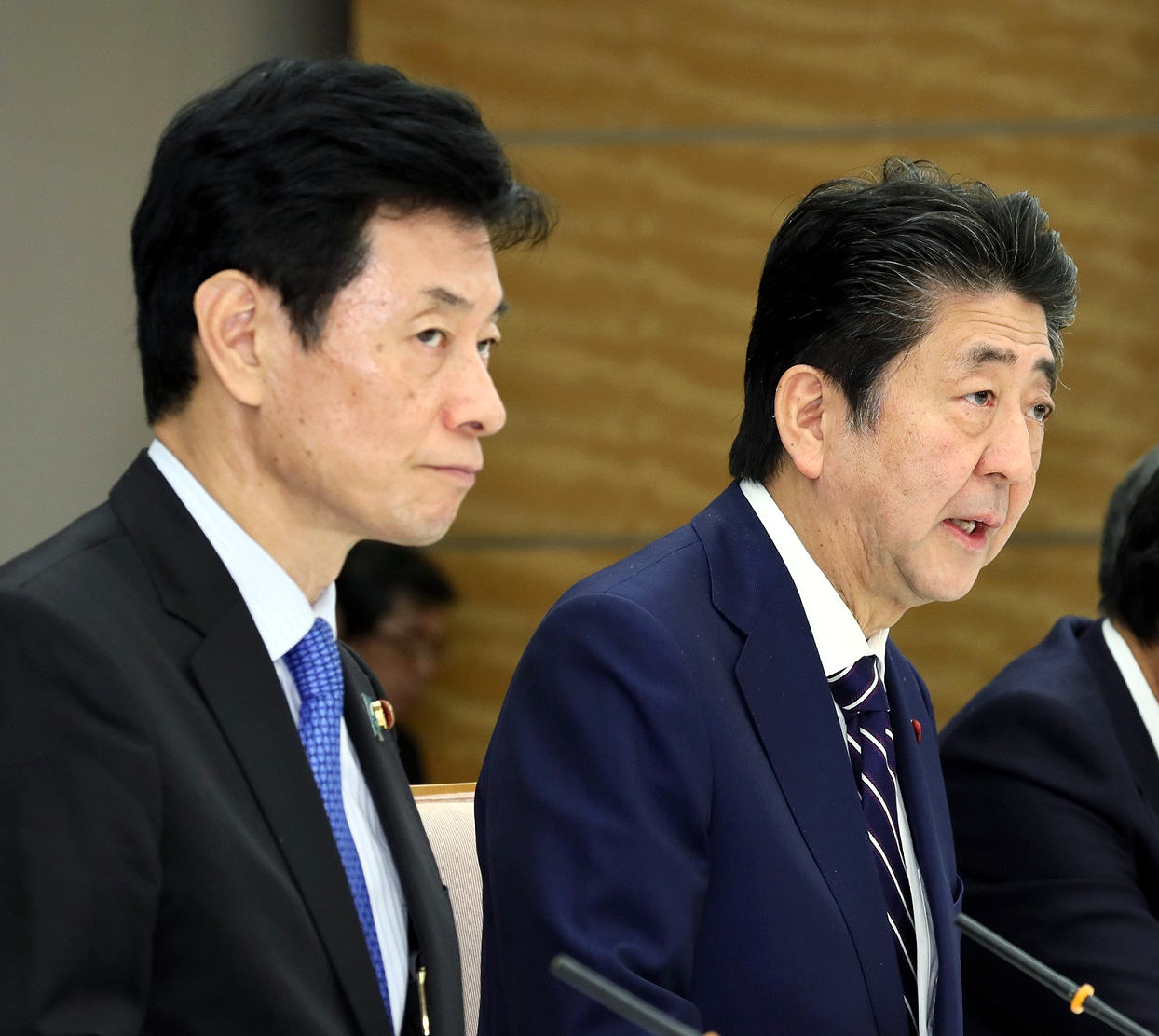
Nishimura with Shinzō Abe (29 October 2019)

A native of Akashi, Hyōgo and a relative of Akira Fukida, a former Minister of Home Affairs, Nishimura graduated from the University of Tokyo, Faculty of Law in 1985.

Nishimura joined the Ministry of International Trade and Industry in 1985 and graduated from Graduate School of Public Affairs, University of Maryland in 1992 while in the ministry. In 2003 he was elected for the first time as an independent after running unsuccessfully in 2000. He later joined the LDP.

Nishimura was running for the LDP presidential elections which was held September 28, 2009, and came in third after Sadakazu Tanigaki, who was elected, and Kōno Tarō. In the 2021 presidential election, Nishimura was the lead sponsor for Sanae Takaishi.

Nishimura also served as acting director, Land, Infrastructure and Transport Division of LDP, Parliamentary Secretary for Foreign Affairs (Fukuda Cabinet), Deputy Chairman, Policy Research Council of LDP, Minister of Economy, Trade and Industry of LDP's Shadow Cabinet, Senior Vice Minister of Cabinet Office.

Since September 2019, Nishimura is serving as minister for economic and fiscal policy; economic revitalization; social security reform; the Trans-Pacific Partnership; and as minister for COVID-19 pandemic response from March 2020 until October 2021.

On 8 July 2021, Nishimura announced the government would seek financial institutions "to lobby [their] customers that operate bars and restaurants to comply with government requests to temporarily close" and possibly to withhold loans to holdouts, as well as to request beverage wholesale companies to stop trading with such businesses. The government retracted the policy a day later, however, with the chief cabinet secretary Katsunobu Kato stating "he had instructed Nishimura to be more careful about what he says during news conferences".

In August 2021, Nishimura became the first Suga cabinet minister to visit the controversial Yasukuni Shrine that enshrine the WWII war criminals. The visit was made the day after his remarks urging people to stay-at-home orders during the Obon season amid COVID-19 Delta surge across Japan. On 1 October 2021, Nishimura announced that Japan will likely becoming a living with COVID-19 endemic phase.

Prior to the Fukushima nuclear accident in 2011, Nishimura has stated to push for restarts of more than 10 nuclear reactors. Nishimura said the government will keep its stakes in Sakhalin-II, one of the world’s largest integrated and export-oriented oil and gas projects, owned by Gazprom, Shell, Mitsui and Mitsubishi.

In June 2022, Nishimura was criticized for hosting on his official website for 10 years a gallery of street photography of women, apparently without their consent, titled "Picture book of beauties from around the world." Nishimura's August 2022 visit to Yasukuni became the first from the Kishida cabinet.

=== Slush fund scandal ===
In November 2023, prosecutors began voluntarily questioning members of several factions of the LDP, including the largest faction of which Nishimura was a member, on suspicion of receiving slush fund money in the form of revenues from fundraising parties totaling over ¥100 million that had not been reported in political funding statements. News media reported the following month, citing sources, that Nishimura was suspected to have received unreported payments.

On 9 December 2023, it was reported that Prime Minister Fumio Kishida was preparing to replace Nishimura in his Cabinet. On 14 December, Nishimura and several others resigned from their cabinet posts. In April 2024, his party membership was suspended for one year due to the scandal.

=== Later career ===
After Sanae Takaichi was elected LDP president in October 2025, Nishimura was appointed executive vice chairman (委員長代行) of the LDP Election Strategy Committee. After the landslide victory for the LDP in the February 2026 general election, Nishimura was promoted to chairman.

== Ideology ==
Nishimura is affiliated to the openly revisionist lobby Nippon Kaigi, He advocates its main causes, which are: the revision of the constitution, the right for collective self-defense (revision of Article 9), visits to Yasukuni Shrine.

Political offices
Preceded by Kōichi Hagiuda	Deputy Chief Cabinet Secretary (Political Affairs, House of Representatives); 2017–2019	Succeeded by Akihiro Nishimura
Preceded by Toshimitsu Motegi	Minister of State for Economic and Fiscal Policy; 2019–2021	Succeeded by Daishiro Yamagiwa
Preceded by Kōichi Hagiuda	Minister of Economy, Trade and Industry; 2022–2023	Succeeded by Ken Saitō
Party political offices
Preceded by Keiji Furuya	Chairman of the LDP Election Strategy Committee; 2026–present	Incumbent
