= Tomoaki Shimada =

Japanese politician (born 1969)

- 島田 智明

Parliamentary Vice-Minister for Foreign Affairs
- Incumbent
- Assumed office 22 October 2025
- Prime Minister: Sanae Takaichi
- Preceded by: Akiko Ikuina

Member of the House of Representatives
- Incumbent
- Assumed office 27 October 2024
- Constituency: Kinki PR

Mayor of Kawachinagano
- In office 3 August 2016 – 2 August 2024
- Preceded by: Keiji Shibata
- Succeeded by: Shuhei Nishino

Personal details
- Born: 2 December 1969 (age 56) Kawachinagano, Osaka, Japan
- Party: Liberal Democratic
- Education: Kyoto University (B.Eng. in 1993); University of Tokyo (M.Sc. in 1995); National University of Singapore (M.B.A. in 2000); INSEAD (Ph.D. in 2005)
- Website: Official website of Tomoaki Shimada (in Japanese)

Tomoaki Shimada (島田 智明, Shimada Tomoaki; born 2 December 1969) is a Japanese politician of the Liberal Democratic Party (LDP), who serves as a member of the House of Representatives since 2024. He was appointed as Parliamentary Vice-Minister for Foreign Affairs in the First and Second Takaichi cabinet. He was previously a mayor of Kawachinagano, Osaka from 2016 to 2024 for two consecutive terms.

== Early life and education ==
After completing his B.Eng. degree in information science at Kyoto University and his M.Sc. degree in information science at University of Tokyo, Shimada worked at A.T. Kearney, a management consulting company in Tokyo. He then worked in Singapore as a manager for a manufacturing company (Framatome Connectors International), an IT company (Fujitsu Computers), and a venture company in the area of marketing and sales. During this time, he also earned an M.B.A. (part-time) degree from National University of Singapore. In 2005 Shimada earned his Ph.D. degree from INSEAD in France. He worked for International University of Japan as Assistant Professor of Management from 2005 to 2006, and Kobe University as Associate Professor of Operations Management from 2007 to 2016.

== Personal life ==
Shimada is married with one daughter. He ran more than 60 full marathons, and his best record is 2:50:57 in Itabashi City Marathon 2023.
