= Yutaka Fukushima =

Japanese politician (born 1958)

- 福島 豊
- Official portrait, 2000

Member of the House of Representatives
- In office 19 July 1993 – 21 July 2009
- Preceded by: Shigeaki Haruta
- Succeeded by: Fumiyoshi Murakami
- Constituency: Osaka 7th (1993–1996); Osaka 6th (1996–2009)

Personal details
- Born: 4 January 1958 (age 68) Sakai, Osaka, Japan
- Party: Komeito
- Other political affiliations: CGP (1993–1994); NFP (1994–1998)
- Education: Kyoto University

Yutaka Fukushima (福島 豊, Fukushima Yutaka; born 4 January 1958) is a former Japanese politician of the New Komeito Party, who served as a member of the House of Representatives in the Diet (national legislature). He was born in Sakai, Osaka but grew up in Saitama Prefecture. A graduate of Kyoto University, he worked as a doctor in Kyoto for ten years. In 1993, he was elected to the House of Representatives for the first time.
