= Koichiro Ichimura =

Japanese politician

- 市村 浩一郎
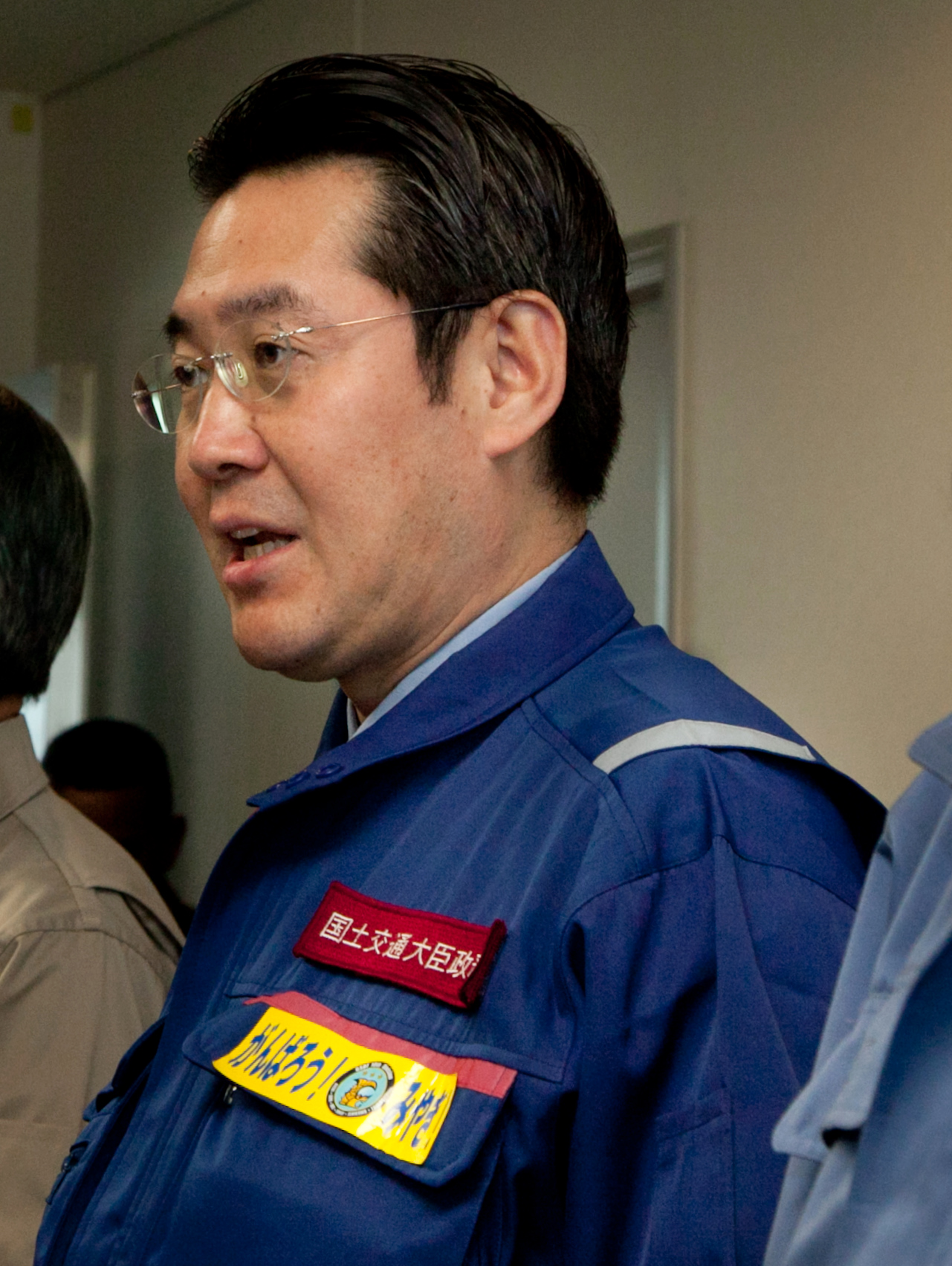
- Ichimura in 2011

Member of the House of Representatives
- Incumbent
- Assumed office 2 November 2021
- Preceded by: Masaki Ōgushi
- Constituency: Hyōgo 6th (2021–2024); Kinki PR (2024–present)
- In office 9 November 2003 – 16 November 2012
- Preceded by: Yuriko Koike
- Succeeded by: Masaki Ōgushi
- Constituency: Hyōgo 6th (2003–2005); Kinki PR (2005–2009); Hyōgo 6th (2009–2012)

Personal details
- Born: 16 July 1964 (age 62) Fukuoka, Japan
- Party: Innovation (since 2016)
- Other political affiliations: JNP (1992–1994); NFP (1994–1998); DPJ (1998–2014); Independent (2014–2016)
- Education: Hitotsubashi University

Koichiro Ichimura (市村 浩一郎, Ichimura Kōichirō; born 16 July 1964) is a Japanese politician of the Japan Innovation Party, who serves as a member of the House of Representatives in the Diet (national legislature). A native of Fukuoka, Fukuoka and graduate of Hitotsubashi University, he was elected to the House of Representatives for the first time in 2003 after an unsuccessful run in 2000.
