= Masaki Ogushi =

Japanese politician (born 1966)

- 大串 正樹
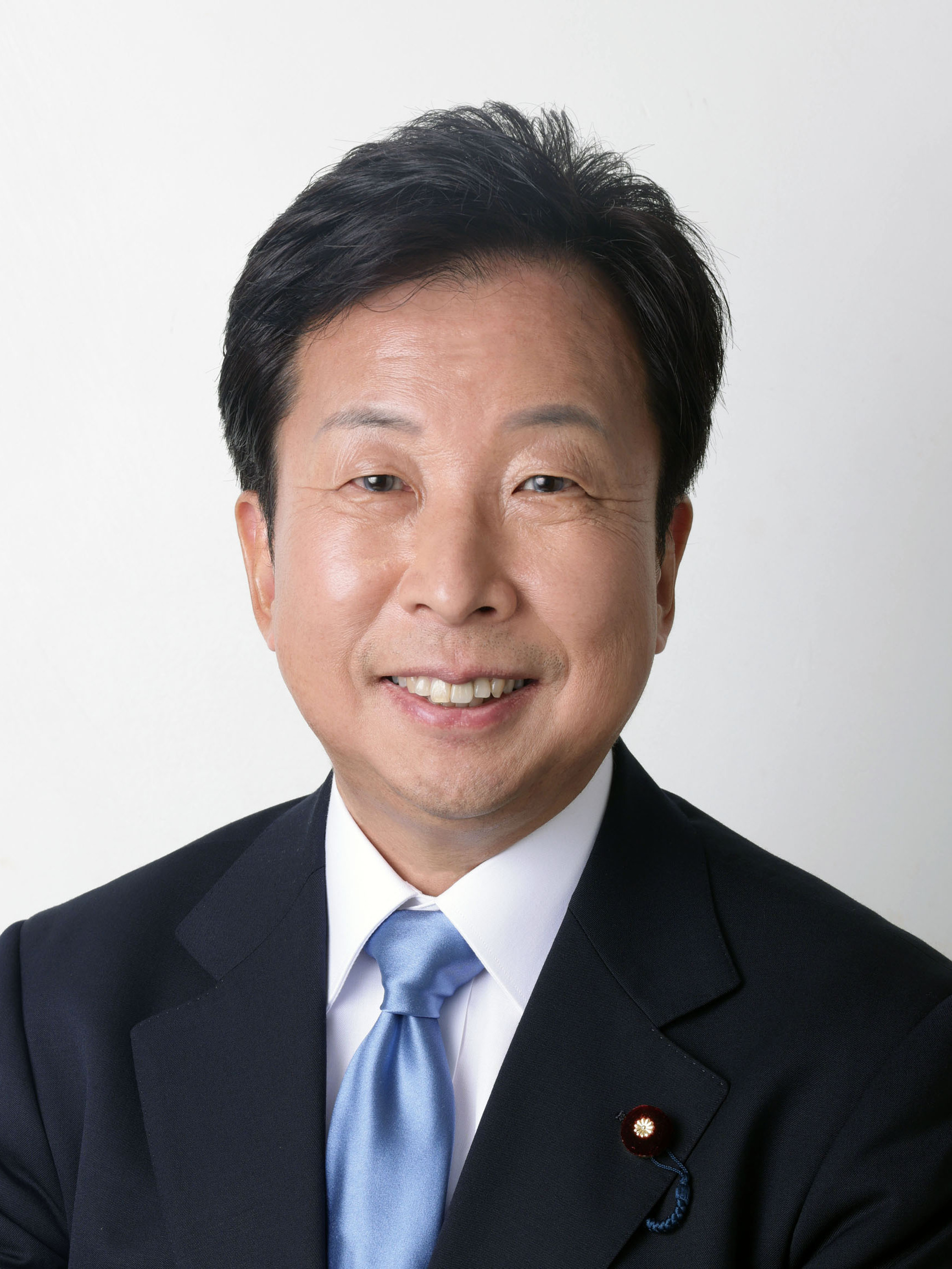
- Official portrait, 2024

Member of the House of Representatives
- Incumbent
- Assumed office 18 December 2012
- Preceded by: Koichiro Ichimura
- Constituency: Hyōgo 6th (2012–2021); Kinki PR (2021–2026); Hyōgo 6th (2026–present)

Personal details
- Born: 20 January 1966 (age 60) Nishinomiya, Hyōgo, Japan
- Party: Liberal Democratic
- Education: Tohoku University; Japan Advanced Institute of Science and Technology

Masaki Ogushi (大串正樹, Ogushi Masaki; born 20 January 1966) is a Japanese politician serving as state minister of economy, trade and industry and state minister of the Cabinet Office since 2024. He has been a member of the House of Representatives since 2012.
