= Keigo Hashimoto (politician) =

Japanese politician (born 1988)

- 橋本 慧悟
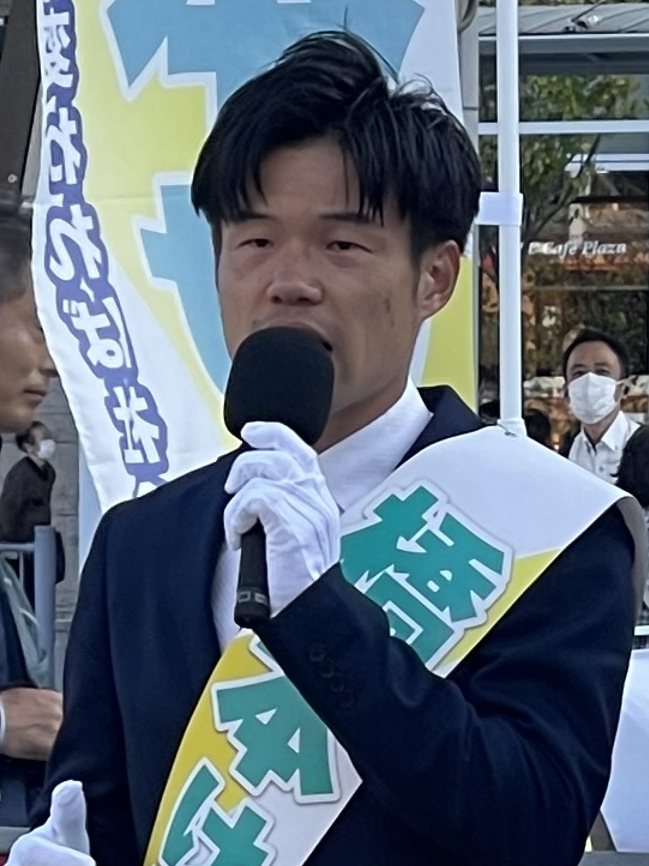
- Hashimoto in 2024

Member of the House of Representatives
- In office 1 November 2024 – 23 January 2026
- Constituency: Kinki PR

Member of the Hyōgo Prefectural Assembly
- In office 30 April 2023 – 15 October 2024
- Constituency: Akashi City

Personal details
- Born: 3 December 1988 (age 37) Ono, Hyōgo, Japan
- Party: CRA (since 2026)
- Other political affiliations: Independent (2023–2024); CDP (2024–2026)
- Education: Keio University

Keigo Hashimoto (橋本慧悟, Hashimoto Keigo; born 3 December 1988) is a Japanese politician who served as a member of the House of Representatives from 2024 to 2026. From 2023 to 2024, he was a member of the Hyogo Prefectural Assembly.
