= 2023 Democratic Party for the People leadership election =

Political party election in Japan

- 2 September 2023
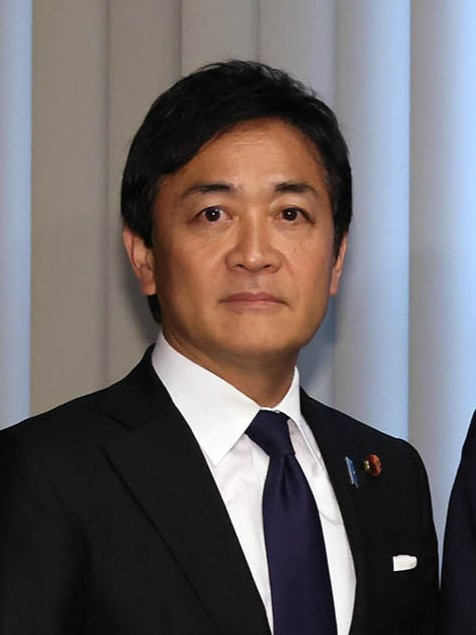

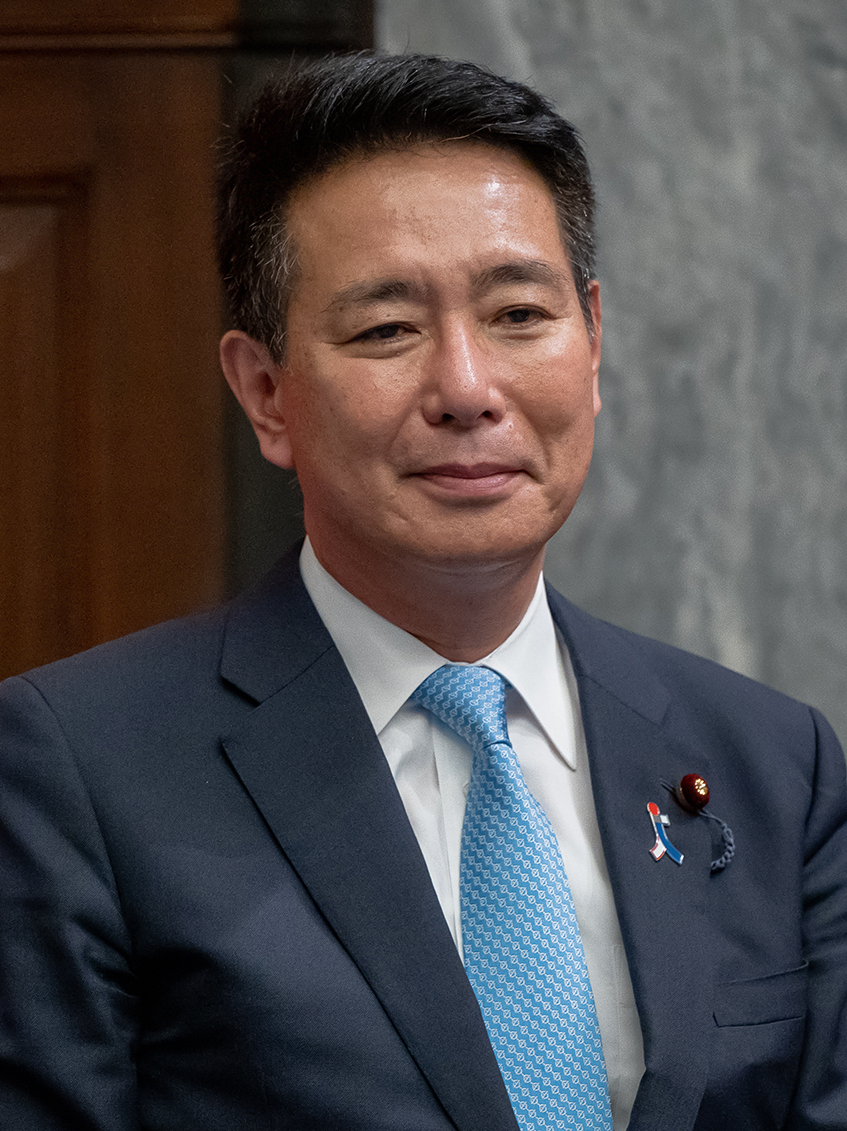
Candidate	Yuichiro Tamaki	Seiji Maehara
Leader's seat	Kagawa 2nd	Kyoto 2nd
Diet members	28	14
Party members	23	5
Local assembly	23	5
Candidates	6	7
Total points	80 (72.1%)	31 (27.9%)
Leader before election
Yuichiro Tamaki
Elected Leader
Yuichiro Tamaki

The 2023 Democratic Party For the People leadership election was held on 2 September 2023 in accordance with the end of the presidential term which had commenced in 2020. Incumbent president Yuichiro Tamaki was re-elected overwhelmingly against former foreign minister Seiji Maehara.

== Background ==
The second incarnation of the Democratic Party For the People (DPFP) was founded in September 2020 by Tamaki and fifteen other Diet members who refused to participate in the merger with the Constitutional Democratic Party. The party performed well in the 2021 lower house election, increasing its representation from eight seats to eleven. In February 2022, the DPFP voted in favour of the government budget, citing Prime Minister Fumio Kishida's promise to consider temporarily reducing the gasoline tax. This marked the first time a large opposition party had voted for the budget in decades, and was harshly criticised by other opposition parties. There was also internal dissent: deputy leader Seiji Maehara absented himself from the vote and openly criticised the decision. In the 2022 upper house election, Tamaki aimed to retain the seven seats the party was defending and win five million PR votes. The DPFP ultimately lost two seats and secured 3.16 million PR votes, which Tamaki defended as higher than the 2.59 million garnered in the previous lower house election.

== Electoral system ==
The election was conducted via a points system:

- Each of the party's members of the National Diet had a vote worth two points. (42 points total)
- Registered party members or supporters could vote via mail or online. Points for this tier were awarded to candidates in proportion to votes won. (28 points total)
- Each of the party's members of local councils or prefectural assemblies could vote via mail or online. Points for this tier were awarded to candidates in proportion to votes won. (28 points total)
- Each of the party's approved candidates for future Diet elections had a vote worth one point. (13 points total)

In order to win, a candidate must secure more than 50% of points. If no candidate won more than 50%, a runoff was to be held the same day. In the runoff, only Diet members and approved candidates could vote.

== Candidates ==
Candidate	Offices held
Yuichiro Tamaki (age 54); Kagawa Prefecture	Member of the House of Representatives (2009–); President of the Democratic Party for the People (2020–)
Seiji Maehara (age 61); Kyoto Prefecture	Member of the House of Representatives (1993–); Minister for Foreign Affairs (2010–11); President of the Democratic Party of Japan (2005–06); President of the Democratic Party (2017)

=== Sponsors ===
Yuichiro Tamaki (5/5)	Seiji Maehara (4/4)
Diet members: Motohisa Furukawa; Yoshifumi Hamano; Tetsuji Isozaki; Takanori Kawai; Ken Tanaka; Local assembly members: Tatsuo Ishiguro; Yasuhiro Kogayu; Takashi Murayama; Kyoko Ota; Shoei Sakagami	Diet members: Yukiko Kada; Shinji Nagatomo; Alex Saito; Atsushi Suzuki; Local assembly members: Hidetoshi Morimoto; Isao Onzuka; Tsuneo Sakai; Kenichi Tani

== Contest ==
Tamaki and Maehara registered their candidacies on 3 August. The contest revolved mainly around the party's approach to government and opposition. Maehara strongly criticised Tamaki's course, which he described as too close to the government. He stated that voting for the budget compromised the party's position. He called for the DPFP to firmly anchor itself in opposition and pursue a non-LDP and non-Communist coalition. He particularly favoured cooperation with Nippon Ishin no Kai, which shared many of the party's conservative positions. Tamaki defended pragmatic cooperation with the LDP in order to achieve the party's policy goals. He advocated "seek[ing] cooperation beyond the boundaries of ruling and opposition parties, based on a policy-driven approach". He also did not rule out forming a coalition with the LDP. In terms of policy, Tamaki supported continuing expansionist fiscal policy, believing it was on the verge of reversing wage deflation. He also called for increasing the consumption tax and doubling spending on education and science. Maehara proposed expanding social security and abolishing means testing, funded from Japan's foreign exchange reserves.

Both the Constitutional Democratic Party and Nippon Ishin were understood to prefer Maehara. The trade union federation RENGO, one of the party's major sources of support, remained publicly neutral for fear that internal conflicts could lead to a split in the party.

== Results ==
Tamaki was decisively re-elected, securing a two to one margin among the Diet caucus and more than 80% support from both party members and local assembly officials. The party's thirteen approved Diet candidates favoured Maehara seven to six. Overall, Tamaki won 80 of the 111 available points. Media attributed his commanding margin to endorsement from private sector-union affiliated Diet members, who consolidated around Tamaki during the race.

Candidate	Diet members			Party members & supporters			Local assembly members			Diet candidates			Total
Candidate	Votes	%	Points	Votes	%	Points	Votes	%	Points	Votes	%	Points	Total
Yuichiro Tamaki	14	66.7	28	13,757	80.6	23	202	82.1	23	6	46.2	6	80
Seiji Maehara	7	33.3	14	3,306	19.4	5	44	17.9	5	7	53.8	7	31
Total	21	100.0	42	17,063	100.0	28	246	100.0	28	13	100.0	13	111
Invalid	0			122			1			0			
Turnout	21	100.0		17,185	46.8		247	91.1		13	100.0		
Eligible	21			36,682			271			13			
