= Kyoto 1st district =

Japan House of Representatives constituency

- Parliamentary constituency for the Japanese House of Representatives
- Numbered map of Kyoto Prefecture single-member districts
- Prefecture: Kyoto
- Proportional District: Kinki
- Electorate: 389,304

Current constituency
- Created: 1994
- Seats: One
- Party: Liberal Democratic
- Representatives: Yasushi Katsume
- Municipalities: Kamigyō-ku, Kita-ku, Nakagyō-ku, Minami-ku, and Shimogyō-ku of Kyoto City

Kyoto 1st district (京都府第1区, Kyoto-fu dai-ikku or simply 京都1区, Kyoto-ikku ) is a single-member constituency of the House of Representatives in the national Diet of Japan located in Kyoto Prefecture.

== Areas covered ==
=== 1994–present ===
- Kyoto City
  - Kamigyō-ku
  - Kita-ku
  - Nakagyō-ku
  - Minami-ku
  - Shimogyō-ku

== List of representatives ==
Election	Representative	Party	Notes
1996	Bunmei Ibuki	Liberal Democratic	
2000	Bunmei Ibuki	Liberal Democratic	
2003	Bunmei Ibuki	Liberal Democratic	
2005	Bunmei Ibuki	Liberal Democratic	
2009	Tomoyuki Taira	Democratic	(Note: Taira left the Democratic Party in protest against Noda Cabinet’s decision to restart Kansai Electric Power Company's Ōi Nuclear Power Plant. After becoming an independent, he joined Your Party.)
2009	Tomoyuki Taira	Independent	(Note: Taira left the Democratic Party in protest against Noda Cabinet’s decision to restart Kansai Electric Power Company's Ōi Nuclear Power Plant. After becoming an independent, he joined Your Party.)
2009	Tomoyuki Taira	Your	(Note: Taira left the Democratic Party in protest against Noda Cabinet’s decision to restart Kansai Electric Power Company's Ōi Nuclear Power Plant. After becoming an independent, he joined Your Party.)
2012	Bunmei Ibuki	Liberal Democratic	
2014	Bunmei Ibuki	Liberal Democratic	
2017	Bunmei Ibuki	Liberal Democratic	
2021	Yasushi Katsume	Liberal Democratic	
2024	Yasushi Katsume	Liberal Democratic	
2026	Yasushi Katsume	Liberal Democratic	

== Election results ==
2026
Party	Candidate	Votes	%	±%
LDP	Yasushi Katsume	78,098	37.0	▲5.1
Centrist Reform	Kōzō Hiratake	28,899	13.7	
Ishin	Takashi Sasaki	26,147	12.4	▼6.7
JCP	Toshinori Kamano	21,382	10.1	▼5.0
Team Mirai	Sachiko Horiba	17,208	8.1	
DPP	Takatoshi Katsura	13,644	6.5	
Liberal	Satoshi Hamada	12,885	6.1	
Sanseitō	Aohito Taniguchi	12,881	6.1	▼0.9
Registered electors		385,158		
Turnout			55.55	▲3.30
LDP hold				

2024
Party	Candidate	Votes	%	±%
Liberal Democratic (endorsed by Komeito)	Yasushi Katsume	63,057	31.90	▼8.50
Innovation	Sachiko Horiba	37,876	19.10	▼9.95
Constitutional Democratic	Kōzō Hiratake	36,232	18.30	New
Communist	Hirofumi Isaka	29,988	15.20	▼15.35
Reiwa Shinsengumi	Narumi Yasumochi	14,531	7.30	New
Sanseitō	Yuji Adachi	13,825	7.00	New
Independent	Hiroko Yamashita	2,385	1.20	New
Majority		25,181	12.80	
Registered electors		387,109		
Turnout			52.25	▼3.65
LDP hold				

2021
Party	Candidate	Votes	%	±%
Liberal Democratic (endorsed by Komeito)	Yasushi Katsume	86,238	40.40	▼6.92
Communist	Keiji Kokuta (PR seat incumbent) (won PR seat)	65,201	30.55	▼2.72
Innovation	Sachiko Horiba (won PR seat)	62,007	29.05	New
Majority		21,037	9.85	
Registered electors		390,373		
Turnout			55.90	▲7.06
LDP hold				

2017
Party	Candidate	Votes	%	±%
Liberal Democratic (endorsed by Komeito)	Bunmei Ibuki (incumbent)	88,106	47.32	▲6.76
Communist	Keiji Kokuta (PR seat incumbent) (won PR seat)	61,938	33.27	▲3.89
Kibō no Tō	Seiko Shimamura	36,134	19.41	New
Majority		26,168	14.05	
Registered electors		393,178		
Turnout			48.84	▲0.14
LDP hold				

2014
Party	Candidate	Votes	%	±%
Liberal Democratic (endorsed by Komeito)	Bunmei Ibuki (incumbent)	73,684	40.56	▲7.34
Communist	Keiji Kokuta (PR seat incumbent) (won PR seat)	53,379	29.38	▲9.55
Innovation	Ikuta Tasaka	36,353	20.01	New
Independent	Tomoyuki Taira	17,307	9.53	New
Independent	Sumimura Ninagawa	960	0.53	New
Majority		20,305	11.18	
Turnout			48.70	
LDP hold				

2012
Party	Candidate	Votes	%	±%
Liberal Democratic (endorsed by Komeito)	Bunmei Ibuki (PR seat incumbent)	69,287	33.22	▼0.09
Restoration	Ikuta Tasaka	47,273	22.67	New
Communist	Keiji Kokuta (PR seat incumbent) (won PR seat)	41,349	19.83	▼2.38
Your	Tomoyuki Taira (incumbent)	24,591	11.79	New
Democratic (endorsed by PNP)	Megumi Yūno	24,129	11.57	▼31.46
Happiness Realization	Yūji Tanabe	1,932	0.93	▼0.52
Majority		22,014	10.55	
Turnout				
LDP gain from Your				

2009
Party	Candidate	Votes	%	±%
Democratic (endorsed by PNP)	Tomoyuki Taira	105,818	43.03	▲14.04
Liberal Democratic (endorsed by Komeito)	Bunmei Ibuki (incumbent) (won PR seat)	81,913	33.31	▼14.40
Communist	Keiji Kokuta (PR seat incumbent) (won PR seat)	54,605	22.21	▼1.09
Happiness Realization	Yumiko Tanemura	3,576	1.45	New
Majority		23,905	9.72	
Turnout				
Democratic gain from LDP				

2005
Party	Candidate	Votes	%	±%
Liberal Democratic	Bunmei Ibuki (incumbent)	112,848	47.71	▲5.44
Democratic	Kazuya Tamaki (PR seat incumbent)	68,563	28.99	▼3.09
Communist	Keiji Kokuta (PR seat incumbent) (won PR seat)	55,097	23.30	▼2.35
Majority		44,285	18.72	
Turnout				
LDP hold				

2003
Party	Candidate	Votes	%	±%
Liberal Democratic	Bunmei Ibuki (incumbent)	83,644	42.27	▲0.13
Democratic	Kazuya Tamaki (PR seat incumbent) (won PR seat)	63,487	32.08	▲7.59
Communist	Keiji Kokuta (PR seat incumbent) (won PR seat)	50,762	25.65	▼7.72
Majority		20,157	10.19	
Turnout				
LDP hold				

2000
Party	Candidate	Votes	%	±%
Liberal Democratic	Bunmei Ibuki (incumbent)	86,490	42.14	▲10.87
Communist	Keiji Kokuta (PR seat incumbent) (won PR seat)	68,493	33.37	▲3.42
Democratic	Kenji Hishida	50,256	24.49	New
Majority		17,997	8.77	
Turnout				
LDP hold				

1996
Party	Candidate	Votes	%	±%
Liberal Democratic	Bunmei Ibuki	63,094	31.27	New
Communist	Keiji Kokuta (won PR seat)	60,441	29.95	New
New Frontier	Yuzuru Takeuchi	47,103	23.34	New
Democratic	Tetsuro Fukuyama	29,275	14.51	New
Liberal League	Sumimura Ninagawa	1,877	0.93	New
Majority		2,653	1.32	
Turnout				
LDP win (new seat)				

== See also ==
- Kyoto 1st district (1947–1993)
