= Kyoto 6th district =

Japan House of Representatives constituency

- Parliamentary constituency for the Japanese House of Representatives
- Numbered map of Kyoto Prefecture single-member districts
- Prefecture: Kyoto
- Proportional District: Kinki
- Electorate: 457,995

Current constituency
- Created: 1994
- Seats: One
- Party: LDP
- Representatives: Hiromichi Sonosaki
- Municipalities: Joyo, Kizugawa, Kyōtanabe, Uji, Yawata, Kuse District, Sōraku District and Tsuzuki District

Kyoto 6th district (京都府第6区, Kyoto-fu dai-rokku or simply 京都6区, Kyoto-rokku ) is a single-member constituency of the House of Representatives in the national Diet of Japan located in Kyoto Prefecture.

== Areas covered ==
=== 2013–present ===
- Joyo
- Kizugawa
- Kyōtanabe
- Uji
- Yawata
- Kuse District
- Sōraku District
- Tsuzuki District

=== 2002–2013 ===
- Joyo
- Kyōtanabe
- Uji
- Yawata
- Kuse District
- Sōraku District
- Tsuzuki District

=== 1994–2002 ===
- Joyo
- Uji
- Yawata
- Kuse District
- Sōraku District
- Tsuzuki District

== List of representatives ==
Election	Representative	Party	Notes
1996	Kazuya Tamaki	New Frontier	
1996	Kazuya Tamaki	New Fraternity	
1996	Kazuya Tamaki	Democratic	
2000	Yoshiaki Hishida	Liberal Democratic	
2003	Kazunori Yamanoi	Democratic	
2005	Kazunori Yamanoi	Democratic	
2009	Kazunori Yamanoi	Democratic	
2012	Kazunori Yamanoi	Democratic	
2014	Kazunori Yamanoi	Democratic	
2014	Kazunori Yamanoi	Democratic	
2014	Kazunori Yamanoi	Kibō no Tō	
2017	Hiroshi Ando	Liberal Democratic	
2021	Kazunori Yamanoi	CDP	
2024	Kazunori Yamanoi	CDP	
2026	Hiromichi Sonosaki	Liberal Democratic	

== Election results ==
2026
Party	Candidate	Votes	%	±%
LDP	Hiromichi Sonozaki	124,175	47.9	▲21.08
Centrist Reform	Kazunori Yamanoi (Incumbent)	91,922	35.4	▼4.67
Sanseitō	Daina	24,530	9.5	▲1.04
Communist	Ryōichi Kamijō	18,782	7.2	▼1.56
Majority		32,253	12.50	▼0.82
Registered electors		451,308		
Turnout		259,409	58.52	▲4.0
LDP gain from Centrist Reform				

2024
Party	Candidate	Votes	%	±%
CDP	Kazunori Yamanoi (incumbent)	97,542	40.11	▼5.14
Liberal Democratic	Hiromichi Sonozaki	65,152	26.79	▼5.17
Innovation	Hideki Nakajima	38,590	15.87	▼6.92
Communist	Ryoichi Kamijo	21,405	8.80	New
Sanseitō	Hiroshi Ando	20,480	8.42	New
Majority		32,390	13.32	▲0.03
Registered electors		454,843		
Turnout		243,169	54.52	▼2.19
CDP hold				

2021
Party	Candidate	Votes	%	±%
CDP	Kazunori Yamanoi (PR seat incumbent)	116,111	45.25	New
Liberal Democratic (endorsed by Komeito)	Koichiro Shimizu	82,004	31.96	▼11.01
Innovation	Hideki Nakajima	58,487	22.79	New
Majority		34,107	13.29	
Registered electors		460,284		
Turnout			56.81	▲4.31
CDP gain from LDP				

2017
Party	Candidate	Votes	%	±%
Liberal Democratic (endorsed by Komeito)	Hiroshi Ando (PR seat incumbent)	101,977	42.97	▲1.86
Kibō no Tō	Kazunori Yamanoi (incumbent) (won PR seat)	100,338	42.28	New
Communist	Ryoichi Kamijo	34,998	14.75	▲0.13
Majority		1,639	0.69	
Registered electors		461,660		
Turnout			52.50	
LDP gain from Kibō no Tō				

2014
Party	Candidate	Votes	%	±%
Democratic	Kazunori Yamanoi (incumbent)	102,030	44.27	▲10.72
Liberal Democratic (endorsed by Komeito)	Hiroshi Ando (PR seat incumbent) (won PR seat)	94,736	41.11	▲10.81
Communist	Ryoichi Kamijo	33,690	14.62	▲4.54
Majority		7,294	3.16	
Turnout				
Democratic hold				

2012
Party	Candidate	Votes	%	±%
Democratic (endorsed by PNP)	Kazunori Yamanoi (incumbent)	89,672	33.55	▼23.84
Liberal Democratic (endorsed by Komeito)	Hiroshi Ando (won PR seat)	80,990	30.30	▲0.32
Restoration	Koichiro Shimizu	69,691	26.07	New
Communist	Ryoichi Kamijo	26,938	10.08	▼0.46
Majority		8,682	3.25	
Turnout				
Democratic hold				

2009
Party	Candidate	Votes	%	±%
Democratic (endorsed by PNP)	Kazunori Yamanoi (incumbent)	176,022	57.39	▲11.89
Liberal Democratic (endorsed by Komeito)	Kyoko Izawa (PR seat incumbent)	91,944	29.98	▼11.87
Communist	Yoshiyuki Hamada	32,322	10.54	▼2.11
Happiness Realization	Satoko Kitagawa	6,437	2.10	New
Majority		84,078	27.41	
Turnout				
Democratic hold				

2005
Party	Candidate	Votes	%	±%
Democratic	Kazunori Yamanoi (incumbent)	133,708	45.50	▼1.39
Liberal Democratic	Kyoko Izawa (won PR seat)	122,969	41.85	▲1.71
Communist	Masaaki Yaguchi	37,181	12.65	▼0.32
Majority		10,739	3.65	
Turnout				
Democratic hold				

2003
Party	Candidate	Votes	%	±%
Democratic	Kazunori Yamanoi (PR seat incumbent)	117,467	46.89	▲11.74
Liberal Democratic	Yoshiaki Hishida (incumbent)	100,541	40.14	▲1.93
Communist	Masaaki Yaguchi	32,499	12.97	▼5.64
Majority		16,926	6.75	
Turnout				
Democratic gain from LDP				

2000
Party	Candidate	Votes	%	±%
Liberal Democratic	Yoshiaki Hishida	96,082	38.21	▲14.80
Democratic	Kazuya Tamaki (incumbent) (won PR seat)	88,392	35.15	New
Communist	Yoshiyuki Hamada	46,787	18.61	▲1.44
Liberal	Tsutomu Matsumura	15,136	6.02	New
Liberal League	Takeshi Yotsui	5,056	2.01	New
Majority		7,690	3.06	
Turnout				
LDP gain from Democratic				

1996
Party	Candidate	Votes	%	±%
New Frontier	Kazuya Tamaki	73,583	32.35	New
Democratic	Kazunori Yamanoi	54,905	24.14	New
Liberal Democratic	Koichiro Shimizu	53,253	23.41	New
Communist	Yoshiyuki Hamada	39,051	17.17	New
New Socialist	Yūko Sonoda	6,691	2.94	New
Majority		18,678	8.21	
Turnout				
New Frontier win (new seat)				
