= Toshitaka Ōoka =

Japanese politician

- 大岡 敏孝
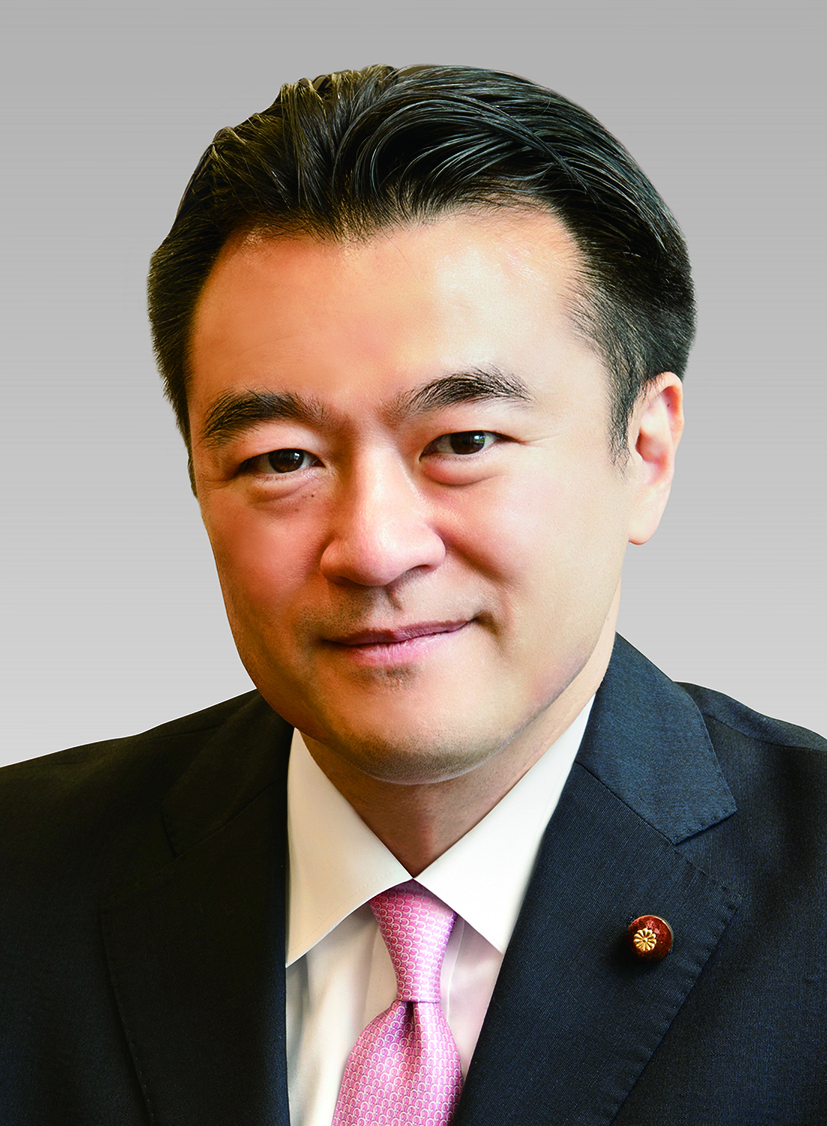
- Official portrait, 2019

Member of the House of Representatives
- Incumbent
- Assumed office 19 December 2012
- Preceded by: Tatsuo Kawabata
- Constituency: Shiga 1st (2012–2024); Kinki PR (2024–2026); Shiga 1st (2026–present)

Member of the Shizuoka Prefectural Assembly
- In office 30 April 2007 – 7 June 2012
- Constituency: Hamamatsu City Naka Ward

Member of the Hamamatsu City Council
- In office 1999–2003

Personal details
- Born: 16 April 1972 (age 54) Kōka, Shiga, Japan
- Party: Liberal Democratic
- Education: Waseda University

Toshitaka Ōoka (Japanese: 大岡敏孝) is a Japanese politician of the Liberal Democratic Party, who serves as a member of the House of Representatives from Shiga Prefecture. First elected in 2014, he was most recently elected in the 2021 election defeating Alex Saito who ran as the candidate of Democratic Party for the People. In 2024, he lost a rematch against Saito who this time represented Nippon Ishin no Kai.
