= Shiga 1st district =

Legislative district of Japan

- Parliamentary constituency for the House of Representatives
- Numbered map of Shiga Prefecture single-member districts
- Electorate: 325,442 (as of September 1, 2022)

Current constituency
- Created: 1994
- Number of members: 1
- Party: LDP
- Representative: Toshitaka Ōoka

Shiga 1st district (滋賀県第1区, Shiga-ken dai-ikku or simply 滋賀1区, Shiga-ikku) is a single-member constituency of the House of Representatives, the lower house of the national Diet of Japan. It is located in Western Shiga and covers the cities of Ōtsu, the prefectural capital, and Takashima. As of 2009, 314,742 eligible voters were registered in the district.

The district's first representative for the district after its creation in the electoral reform of 1994 was Democratic Socialist Tatsuo Kawabata who had represented the five-member SNTV Shiga At-large district since 1986. After the party realignments of the 1990s, he like most former Democratic Socialists eventually joined the Democratic Party (Minshutō) of Japan where he became a leading figure in the Democratic Socialist faction, also often referred to as Kawabata group. In the landslide "postal election" of 2005, Kawabata lost Shiga 1st district to Liberal Democrat Ken'ichirō Ueno, but regained it in the 2009 general election that swept the Democrats to power. Kawabata became a minister of state in the Hatoyama, Kan and Noda cabinets; Ueno who failed re-election by proportional representation was a candidate in the 2010 Shiga gubernatorial race, but lost to centre-left supported incumbent Yukiko Kada. In the landslide Democratic defeat of 2012, Kawabata lost the district to Liberal Democratic former Shizuoka assemblyman Toshitaka Ōoka. Despite his comparatively narrow margin of defeat that gave him rank 4 on the DPJ list in Kinki, Kawabata also failed to win a proportional seat as the Democratic Party was reduced to fourth party (12.0%) in the Kinki proportional vote and only won three of 29 seats.in

After Yukiko Kada had finished her second term as governor, she unsuccessfully challenged Ōoka for the seat in 2017, however she would win a seat in the House of Councillors two years later.

== List of representatives ==
Representative	Party	Dates	Notes
Tatsuo Kawabata	NFP	1996 – 2000	Joined the New Fraternity Party after the dissolution of the NFP, the Democratic Party in 1998
Tatsuo Kawabata	DPJ	2000 – 2005	Gained a seat in the Kinki PR block ("loss ratio" 94.5%)
Ken'ichirō Ueno	LDP	2005 – 2009	Failed re-election in the Kinki PR block ("loss ratio" 73.1%)
Tatsuo Kawabata	DPJ	2009 – 2012	Failed re-election in the Kinki PR block ("loss ratio" 90.5%)
Toshitaka Ōoka	LDP	2012 – 2024	Gained a seat in the Kinki PR block
Alex Saito	Ishin	2024 – 2026	Gained a seat in the Kinki PR block
Toshitaka Ōoka	LDP	2026 –	

== Election results ==
2026
Party	Candidate	Votes	%	±%
LDP	Toshitaka Ōoka	76,367	42.0	▲1.4
Ishin	Alex Saito (elected in Kinki PR block)	47,217	26.0	▼17.0
DPP	Akinari Kawai (elected in Kinki PR block)	38,911	21.4	
JCP	Akiko Kinose	19,198	10.6	▼5.8
Registered electors		323,075		
Turnout			57.78	▲2.68
LDP gain from Ishin				

2024
Party	Candidate	Votes	%	±%
Ishin	Alex Saito	74,126	43.0	
LDP	Toshitaka Ōoka (elected in Kinki PR block)	70,033	40.6	▼11.9
JCP	Akiko Kinose	28,359	16.4	
Registered electors		323,530		
Turnout			55.10	▼3.80
Ishin gain from LDP				

2021
Party	Candidate	Votes	%	±%
LDP	Toshitaka Ōoka	97,482	52.5	▲4.8
DPP	Alex Saito (elected in Kinki PR block)	84,106	45.1	
Anti-NHK	Chiho Hidaka	5,092	2.7	
Registered electors		324,354		
Turnout			58.90	▲2.95
LDP hold				

2017
Party	Candidate	Votes	%	±%
LDP	Toshitaka Ōoka	84,994	47.7	▲1.5
Independent	Yukiko Kada	79,724	44.7	
Social Democratic	Yoshiko Kosaka	13,483	7.6	
Registered electors		323,630		
Turnout			55.95	▲0.99
LDP hold				

2014
Party	Candidate	Votes	%	±%
LDP	Toshitaka Ōoka	78,567	46.2	▲11.3
Democratic	Tatsuo Kawabata (elected by PR)	69,543	40.9	▲9.0
JCP	Kōhei Satō	21,790	12.8	▲2.6
Turnout			54.96	▼7.71
LDP hold				

2012
Party	Candidate	Votes	%	±%
LDP (Kōmeitō)	Toshitaka Ōoka	67,259	34.9	
DPJ (PNP)	Tatsuo Kawabata	60,921	31.9	
JRP (YP)	Toshiki Okumura	43,003	22.3	
JCP	Michiyo Fushiki	19,643	10.2	
Independent	Yukimitsu Nishida	2,048	1.1	

2009
Party	Candidate	Votes	%	±%
DPJ	Tatsuo Kawabata	112,590	51.9	
LDP (Kōmeitō)	Ken'ichirō Ueno	82,262	37.9	
JCP	Takashi Kawauchi	19,920	9.2	
HRP	Yukinori Tainaka	2,037	0.9	
Turnout		219,324	71.14	

2005
Party	Candidate	Votes	%	±%
LDP	Ken'ichirō Ueno	94,671	46.1	
DPJ	Tatsuo Kawabata (elected by PR)	89,503	43.6	
JCP	Takashi Kawauchi	21,111	10.3	
Turnout		207,994	69.53	

2003
Party	Candidate	Votes	%	±%
DPJ	Tatsuo Kawabata	87,857	51.0	
LDP	Ken'ichirō Ueno	64,002	37.2	
JCP	Takashi Kawauchi	20,340	11.8	
Turnout		175,722	59.71	

2000
Party	Candidate	Votes	%	±%
DPJ	Tatsuo Kawabata	78,834	44.2	
LDP	Makoto Mekata	67,001	37.6	
JCP	Minoru Yoshihara	29,753	16.7	
LL	Yoshitaka Kurioka	2,627	1.5	

1996
Party	Candidate	Votes	%	±%
NFP	Tatsuo Kawabata	55,967	34.7	
LDP	Makoto Mekata (elected by PR)	53,476	33.2	
DPJ	Tsutomu Yamamoto (elected by PR)	28,231	17.5	
JCP	Toshikazu Inoue	23,590	14.6	
Turnout		164,565	61.64	
