= Hiroshi Ando (politician) =

Japanese politician (born 1965)

- 安藤 裕
- Official portrait, 2018

Member of the House of Councillors
- Incumbent
- Assumed office 29 July 2025
- Constituency: National PR

Member of the House of Representatives
- In office 16 December 2012 – 14 October 2021
- Preceded by: Multi-member district
- Succeeded by: Kazunori Yamanoi
- Constituency: Kinki PR (2012–2017); Kyoto 6th (2017–2021)

Personal details
- Born: 28 March 1965 (age 61) Yokohama, Kanagawa, Japan
- Party: Sanseitō (since 2024)
- Other political affiliations: LDP (2012–2021); NPK (2022–2024)
- Children: 2
- Education: Keio University
- Occupation: Tax advisor • Politician

Hiroshi Ando (安藤裕, Ando Hiroshi; born 28 March 1965) is a Japanese politician serving as a member of the House of Councillors since 2025. From 2012 to 2021, he was a member of the House of Representatives.
