= Satoshi Inoue =

Satoshi Inoue may refer to:

- Satoshi Inoue (musician) (井上 智, born 1959), Japanese jazz guitarist
- Satoshi Inoue (politician) (井上 哲士, born 1958), Japanese politician
- Satoshi Inoue (comedian)
