= Kyoto 2nd district =

One of Japanese districts

Kyoto 2nd District
- 京都府第2区
- Parliamentary constituency for the Japanese House of Representatives
- Prefecture: Kyoto
- Proportional District: Kinki
- Electorate: 263,524 (as of September 2022)

Current constituency
- Created: 1994
- Seats: One
- Party: Ishin
- Representative: Seiji Maehara

Kyōto 2nd district (京都府第2区 Kyōto-fu dai-ni-ku or simply 京都2区 Kyōto niku) is a constituency of the House of Representatives in the Diet of Japan. It is located in central Kyoto and consists of the Kyoto city wards of Sakyō, Higashiyama and Yamashina. As of 2012, 267,926 eligible voters were registered in the district.

Before the electoral reform of 1994, the area formed part of Kyoto 1st district where five representatives had been elected by single non-transferable vote (SNTV).

Kyoto had been a traditional stronghold of the Japanese Communist Party (JCP), but following the electoral reform that replaced the SNTV multi-member districts with FPTP single-member districts, the JCP could only win the new Kyoto 3rd district while losing the other three districts in Kyoto city (Kyoto 1, 2 and 4) in the 1996 general election, the first under the new system. In the 2nd district JCP newcomer Satoshi Inoue lost narrowly to Liberal Democrat Mikio Okuda, who had previously represented the old multi-member 1st district. Democrat Seiji Maehara ranked third, but won a seat via the Kinki PR block. After the main opposition New Frontier Party had dissolved and its successor groups had mainly been absorbed by the Democratic Party, Maehara won Kyoto 2 in the 2000 general election and has held onto the seat since. Maehara went on to become Democratic Party president in 2005, but resigned following the Livedoor scandal in 2006 and later was a minister of state in the Democratic-led Hatoyama and Kan cabinets.

== Areas covered ==
=== Current district ===
As of 5 January 2023, the areas covered by this district are as follows:

- Kyoto
  - Sakyō-ku
  - Higashiyama-ku
  - Yamashina-ku

== List of representatives ==
Representative	Party	Dates	Notes
Mikio Okuda	LDP	1996–2000	Retired from politics in 2000
Seiji Maehara	DPJ	2000–2016	Incumbent
Seiji Maehara	DP	2016–2017	Incumbent
Seiji Maehara	Ind.	2017	Incumbent
Seiji Maehara	Kibō	2017–2018	Incumbent
Seiji Maehara	DPP	2018–2023	Incumbent
Seiji Maehara	FEFA	2023–2024	Incumbent
Seiji Maehara	Ishin	2024–present	Incumbent

== Election results ==
2026
Party	Candidate	Votes	%	±%
Ishin	Seiji Maehara	49,415	35.7	▼10.2
LDP	Yōji Fujida (Won PR seat)	36,891	26.6	▲4.3
JCP	Akiko Horikawa	18,847	13.6	▼9.5
Centrist Reform	Yuriko Kōno	18,185	13.1	
Team Mirai	Yūsuke Sakai	11,178	8.1	
Reiwa	Chihiro Tsujimura	4,016	2.9	
Registered electors		255,259		
Turnout			55.30	▲2.25
Ishin hold				

2024
Party	Candidate	Votes	%	±%
Ishin	Seiji Maehara	60,922	45.9	
JCP	Akiko Horikawa (Won PR seat)	30,697	23.1	▲6.1
LDP	Eiji Sano	29,638	22.3	▼6.9
Sanseitō	Hiroaki Komatsu	8,270	6.2	
Independent	Yūsuke Honda	2,450	1.8	
Independent	Tetsuo Hirota	851	0.6	
Registered electors		257,842		
Turnout			53.05	▼3.09

2021
Party	Candidate	Votes	%	±%
DPP	Seiji Maehara	72,516	48.89	▲0.2
LDP	Mamoru Shigemoto	43,291	29.19	▼0.8
JCP	Takuaki Chisaka	25,260	17.03	▼4.3
Reiwa	Tatsuya Naka	7,263	4.90	
Turnout			57.14	▼1.21

2017
Party	Candidate	Votes	%	±%
Independent	Seiji Maehara	65,480	48.7	
LDP	Mamoru Shigemoto	40,336	30.0	
JCP	Takuaki Chisaka	28,600	21.28	

2014
Party	Candidate	Votes	%	±%
DPJ	Seiji Maehara	66,227	50.4	
LDP	Kōji Uenaka	37,180	28.3	
JCP	Toshifumi Hara	27,888	21.2	

2012
Party	Candidate	Votes	%	±%
DPJ – PNP	Seiji Maehara	72,170	49.4	
LDP	Kōji Uenaka	42,017	28.7	
JCP	Toshifumi Hara	24,633	16.8	
SDP	Dai Satō	7,416	5.1	

2009
Party	Candidate	Votes	%	±%
DPJ (PNP support)	Seiji Maehara	101,151		
LDP	Tomohiro Yamamoto	42,771		
JCP	Toshifumi Hara	25,856		
SDP	Takakage Fujita	5,028		
HRP	Yoshiteru Karube	1,045		
Turnout		178,905	66.31	

2005
Party	Candidate	Votes	%	±%
DPJ	Seiji Maehara	73,795		
LDP	Tomohiro Yamamoto (elected by PR)	69,330		
JCP	Toshifumi Hara	29,348		
Turnout		175,879	64.5	

2003
Party	Candidate	Votes	%	±%
DPJ	Seiji Maehara	73,934		
LDP	Naohiko Yamamoto	47,962		
JCP	Toshifumi Hara	26,768		
Turnout		151,842	55.37	

2000
Party	Candidate	Votes	%	±%
DPJ	Seiji Maehara	52,077		
LDP	Naohiko Yamamoto	48,057		
JCP	Satoshi Inoue	41,541		
LP	Tōru Taniguchi	11,296		
LL	Masae Toita	2,691		

1996
Party	Candidate	Votes	%	±%
LDP	Mikio Okuda	43,060		
JCP	Satoshi Inoue	42,211		
DPJ	Seiji Maehara (elected by PR)	31,257		
NFP	Kenji Hishida	30,713		
Turnout		150,165	54.75	
