= Yasushi Katsume =

Japanese politician

- 勝目 康
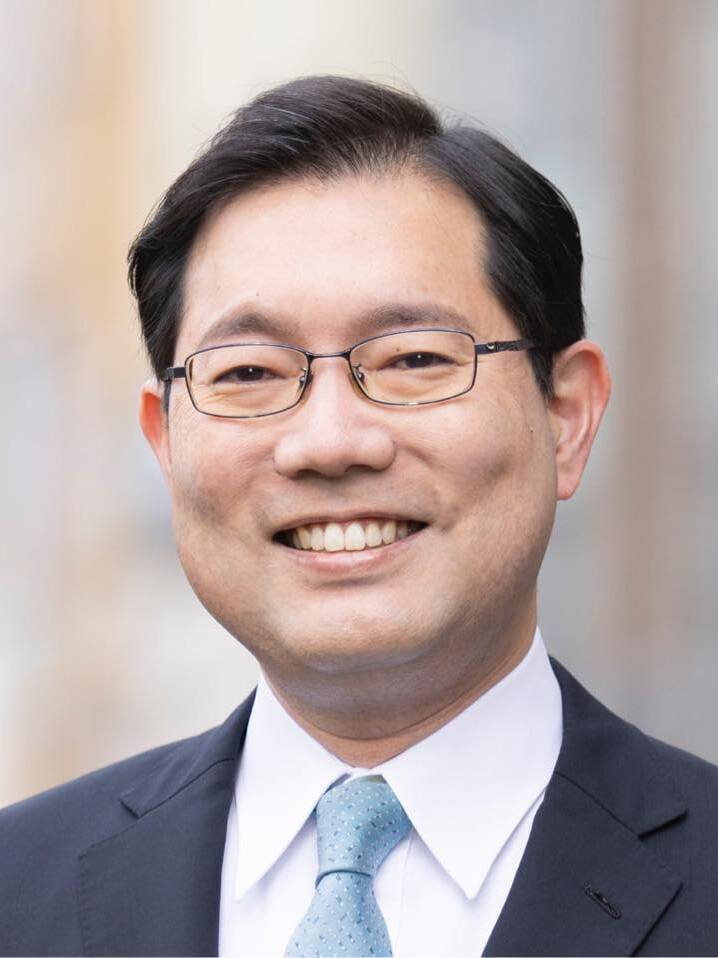
- Official portrait, 2024

Member of the House of Representatives
- Incumbent
- Assumed office 1 November 2021
- Preceded by: Bunmei Ibuki
- Constituency: Kyoto 1st

Personal details
- Born: 17 May 1974 (age 52) Nakagyō, Kyoto, Japan
- Party: Liberal Democratic
- Education: University of Tokyo
- Website: Yasushi Katsume website

Yasushi Katsume (勝目 康, Katsume Yasushi; born 17 May 1974) is a Japanese politician of the Liberal Democratic Party, who serves as a member of the House of Representatives.

== Early years ==
Katsume was born in Nakagyō-ku, Kyoto, Kyoto Prefecture.

After graduating from the Faculty of Law at the University of Tokyo, he joined the Ministry of Home Affairs (current Ministry of Internal Affairs and Communications) in 1997. He served from 1997 to 2021.

== Political career ==
On 4 July 2021, Katsume left the Ministry of Internal Affairs and Communications and announced his candidacy for Kyoto 1st district as Bunmei Ibuki's successor.

In the 2021 general election, Katsume defeated Keiji Kokuta (JCP) and Sachiko Horiba (Ishin) and gained Kyoto 1st's seat.

In the 2024 LDP presidential election, Katsume endorsed Takayuki Kobayashi as a recommender.

In the 2024 general election, Katsume was re-elected.

In November 2024, Katsume was appointed to Parliamentary Vice-Minister for the Environment, and Parliamentary Vice-Minister of Cabinet Office in Second Ishiba cabinet.

In the 2025 LDP presidential election, Katsume endorsed Kobayashi as a recommender again.

In the 2026 general election, Katsume was re-elected.
