= Isaji Tanaka =

Japanese politician (1906–1987)

- 田中 伊三次
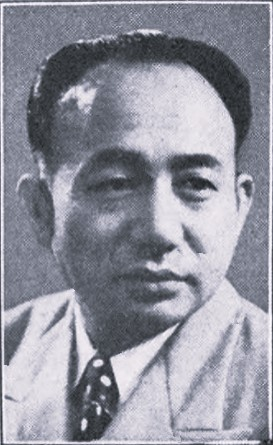
- Tanaka in 1954

Minister of Justice
- In office 22 December 1972 – 25 November 1973
- Prime Minister: Kakuei Tanaka
- Preceded by: Yuichi Kori
- Succeeded by: Umekichi Nakamura
- In office 3 December 1966 – 25 November 1967
- Prime Minister: Eisaku Satō
- Preceded by: Mitsujiro Ishii
- Succeeded by: Bunzo Akama

Vice Speaker of the House of Representatives
- In office 7 December 1963 – 20 December 1965
- Speaker: Naka Funada
- Preceded by: Kenzaburo Hara
- Succeeded by: Sunao Sonoda

Minister of Home Affairs
- In office 23 December 1956 – 10 July 1957
- Prime Minister: Tanzan Ishibashi; Nobusuke Kishi
- Preceded by: Masataka Ōta
- Succeeded by: Yūichi Kōri

Member of the House of Representatives
- In office 24 January 1949 – 28 November 1983
- Preceded by: Taminosuke Tsujii
- Succeeded by: Bunmei Ibuki
- Constituency: Kyoto 1st
- In office 1 May 1942 – 31 March 1947
- Preceded by: Naozaburō Era
- Succeeded by: Multi-member district
- Constituency: Kyoto 1st (1942–1946); Kyoto at-large (1946–1947)

Personal details
- Born: 3 January 1906 Kamigyō, Kyoto, Japan
- Died: 11 April 1987 (aged 81)
- Party: Liberal Democratic (1955–1980)
- Other political affiliations: Mushozoku Club (1942–1947); Democratic (1947–1950); Liberal (1950–1955); Independent (1980–1987)
- Education: Ritsumeikan University

Isaji Tanaka (田中 伊三次, Tanaka Isaji, 3 January 1906 – 11 April 1987) was a Japanese politician, cabinet minister, and Deputy Speaker of the House of Representatives. First elected in 1942, Ishii served 15 terms in the Japanese House of Representatives until retiring in 1983. From 1963 to 1965, he served as the 44th Deputy Speaker of the House of Representatives, and later served two stints as Minister of Justice under prime ministers Eisaku Satō and Kakuei Tanaka.

== Early life and education ==
Born in Shin-Karasuma, Kamigyo Ward, Kyoto City, Kyoto Prefecture on 3 January 1906, Isaji Tanaka attended Ritsumeikan Junior High School and Kyoto Prefectural Second Junior High School before attending Ritsumeikan University. In 1934, he graduated from Ritsumeikan's Faculty of Law and briefly ran his own law practice.

== Political career ==
After serving first as a member of the Kyoto City Council and then the Kyoto Prefectural Assembly, Tanaka was first elected to the House of Representatives in the 1942 general election. In this election, most members successfully elected had received a recommendation from the Imperial Rule Assistance Association, but Tanaka was elected without a recommendation.

After the war, Tanaka was purged by the US-led occupation of Japan and banned from holding public office, but was depurged in 1949. Reelected to his old seat representing Kyoto's 1st district, he went on to serve a total of 15 terms in the House of Representatives, variously representing the Democratic Party, the Liberal Party, and finally the Liberal Democratic Party from 1955 onward.

When Prime minister Shigeru Yoshida resigned in 1954, Ichirō Hatoyama of the Japan Democratic Party became prime minister and Taketora Ogata became president of the Liberal Party. Since Tanaka was an important member of Ogata's faction, he played a role in the merger of the two parties which founded the Liberal Democratic Party (LDP) in 1955. Then when Ogata died unexpectedly in January 1956, Mitsujirō Ishii inherited his faction in the LDP, including Tanaka, and Tanaka's small home in Tokyo's Akasaka district became the headquarters for Ishii's faction, known as the "Wednesday Club" (Suiyō Kurabu).

In December 1963, he became the Deputy Speaker of the House of Representatives under the Speaker of the House of Representatives Naka Funada, and served for approximately two years, until December 1965. In 1966, he was appointed Minister of Justice in cabinet of Prime Minister Eisaku Satō, and in 1972, he was appointed Minister of Justice again in the cabinet of Kakuei Tanaka.

In 1976, Tanaka was named chairman of the Special Committee on the Lockheed Scandal, which was established in the House of Representatives to investigate revelations that senior Japanese politicians had accepted bribes from the Lockheed Corporation, and gained attention for his sharp questioning of right-wing fixer Yoshio Kodama.

In 1980, during an unexpected dissolution of the Diet, Tanaka made clear his staunch opposition to both Prime Minister Masayoshi Ohira and former prime minister Kakuei Tanaka, who retained a strong influence on the Ohira administration, and left the LDP after refusing to be officially endorsed by the LDP. Forgoing 10 million yen in LDP electoral support, Tanaka ran as an independent conservative and secured reelection to a 15th term in the House. In 1983, Tanaka retired from politics and his local base in Kyoto prefecture was inherited by former Ministry of Finance bureaucrat Bunmei Ibuki.

Tanaka died on 11 April 1987 at the age of 81.
