= Satoru Ienishi =

Japanese politician

- 家西 悟

Member of the House of Councillors
- In office 26 July 2004 – 25 July 2010
- Constituency: National PR

Member of the House of Representatives
- In office 21 October 1996 – 10 October 2003
- Preceded by: Constituency established
- Succeeded by: Multi-member district
- Constituency: Kinki PR

Personal details
- Born: 6 May 1960 (age 66) Kyoto Prefecture, Japan
- Party: Democratic (1998–2016)
- Other political affiliations: DP 1996 (1996–1998); DP 2016 (2016–2018)

Satoru Ienishi (家西 悟, Ienishi Satoru; born 6 May 1960) is a Japanese politician of the Democratic Party of Japan, a member of the House of Councillors in the Diet (national legislature). A native of Kyoto Prefecture, he was elected for the first time in 1996.
