= Kyoto 1st district (1947–1993) =

Former Japan House of Representatives constituency

Kyōto 1st district was a constituency of the House of Representatives in the Diet of Japan. Between 1947 and 1993 it elected five Representatives by single non-transferable vote. It was located in Kyōto and consisted, as of 1993, of the cities of Kyōto city's wards of Sakyō, Higashiyama, Kamigyō, Kita, Nakagyō, Shimogyō, Minami and Yamashina. Today, the area is split between Kyōto 1st and 2nd single-member electoral districts.

Kyōto is the stronghold of the Japanese Communist Party and the 1st district was among the few in the country where the party ever nominated more than one candidate – successfully so in the 1972 and 1979 elections; but in 1990, it lost both candidates due to vote splitting. Facing dwindling support for the major parties in the 1970s, the LDP often nominated only two candidates, the JSP just one candidate in Kyoto 1st district.

== Summary of results during the 1955 party system ==
Representatives elected/candidates running.

General election		1958	1960	1963	1967	1969	1972	1976	1979	1980	1983	1986	1990	1993
LDP & conservative independents		3/4	2/3	2/3	2/2	2/2	1/2	1/1	1/2	2/2	2/2	2/2	2/2	2/2
Opposition	center-left	–	1/1	1/1	2/2	2/2	1/2	3/3	2/3	2/2	2/2	2/3	2/2	2/4
Opposition	JSP	2/3	1/2	1/2	0/2	0/1	1/1	0/1	0/1	0/1	0/1	0/1	1/1	0/1
Opposition	JCP	0/1	1/1	1/1	1/1	1/1	2/2	1/2	2/2	1/2	1/2	1/2	0/2	1/1
District magnitude		5												

== Elected representatives ==
Election year	Highest vote (top tōsen)	2nd	3rd	4th	5th
1947	Chōzaburō Mizutani (JSP)	Kazumi Takeuchi (JSP)	Hanji Ogawa (DP)	Taminosuke Tsujii (JSP)	Toyojirō Kawahashi (JLP)
1949	Kichinosuke Takagi (DLP)	Zentarō Taniguchi (JCP)	Isaji Tanaka (DP)	Hanji Ogawa (DP)	Chōzaburō Mizutani (JSP)
1952	Chōzaburō Mizutani (JSP, right)	Isaji Tanaka (LP)	Hanji Ogawa (Progressive)	Susumu Kagata (JSP, left)	Kichinosuke Takagi (LP)
1953	Chōzaburō Mizutani (JSP, right)	Isaji Tanaka (Yoshida LP)	Gen'ichirō Nakagawa (Yoshida LP)	Susumu Kagata (JSP, left)	Sannojō Nakamura (Progressive)
1955	Chōzaburō Mizutani (JSP, right)	Hanji Ogawa (JDP)	Susumu Kagata (JSP, left)	Sannojō Nakamura (JDP)	Isaji Tanaka (LP)
1958	Isaji Tanaka (LDP)	Chōzaburō Mizutani (JSP)	Hanji Ogawa (LDP)	Sannojō Nakamura (LDP)	Susumu Kagata (JSP)
1960	Yoneo Tsubono (JSP)	Isaji Tanaka (LDP)	Hanji Ogawa (LDP)	Chōzaburō Mizutani (DSP)	Zentarō Taniguchi (JCP)
1963	Zentarō Taniguchi (JCP)	Isaji Tanaka (LDP)	Eiichi Nagasue (DSP)	Hanji Ogawa (LDP)	Susumu Kagata (JSP)
1967	Isaji Tanaka (LDP)	Zentarō Taniguchi (JCP)	Hanji Ogawa (LDP)	Shin'ichi Higami (Kōmeitō)	Eiichi Nagasue (DSP)
1969	Zentarō Taniguchi (JCP)	Eiichi Nagasue (DSP)	Hanji Ogawa (LDP)	Shin'ichi Higami (Kōmeitō)	Isaji Tanaka (LDP)
1972	Zentarō Taniguchi (JCP)	Eiichi Nagasue (DSP)	Masaru Umeda (JCP)	Yukio Takemura (JSP)	Isaji Tanaka (LDP)
1976	Isaji Tanaka (LDP)	Yamato Kaji (NLC)	Katsuhiko Takeuchi (Kōmeitō)	Hiroko Fujiwara (JCP)	Eiichi Nagasue (DSP)
1979	Katsuhiko Takeuchi (Kōmeitō)	Masaru Umeda (JCP)	Eiichi Nagasue (DSP)	Hiroko Fujiwara (JCP)	Isaji Tanaka (LDP)
1980	Mikio Okuda (LDP)	Isaji Tanaka (Ind.)	Eiichi Nagasue (DSP)	Hiroko Fujiwara (JCP)	Katsuhiko Takeuchi (Kōmeitō)
1983	Bunmei Ibuki (LDP)	Katsuhiko Takeuchi (Kōmeitō)	Eiichi Nagasue (DSP)	Masaru Umeda (JCP)	Mikio Okuda (LDP)
1986	Mikio Okuda (LDP)	Bunmei Ibuki (LDP)	Katsuhiko Takeuchi (Kōmeitō)	Hiroko Fujiwara (JCP)	Eiichi Nagasue (DSP)
1990	Mikio Okuda (LDP)	Eiichi Nagasue (DSP)	Yukio Takemura (JSP)	Bunmei Ibuki (LDP)	Katsuhiko Takeuchi (Kōmeitō)
1993	Keiji Kokuta (JCP)	Seiji Maehara (JNP)	Bunmei Ibuki (LDP)	Yuzuru Takeuchi (Kōmeitō)	Mikio Okuda (LDP)

== Most recent election results ==
1993
Party	Candidate	Votes	%	±%
JCP	Keiji Kokuta	77,708	20.3	
JNP (NPH, SDF support)	Seiji Maehara	65,182	17.0	
LDP	Bunmei Ibuki	48,893	12.8	
Kōmeitō	Yuzuru Takeuchi	48,597	12.7	
LDP	Mikio Okuda	48,036	12.6	
JRP (SDF support)	Kenji Hishida	45,587	11.9	
JSP (SDF support)	Yukio Takemura	33,780	8.8	
DSP (SDF support)	Kiyohiro Hatanaka	12,776	3.3	
Independent	Hideo Matsumoto	1,641	0.4	
Independent	Haruyoshi Saitō	383	0.1	

1990
Party	Candidate	Votes	%	±%
LDP	Mikio Okuda	67,175	16.2	
DSP	Eiichi Nagasue	65,348	15.7	
JSP	Yukio Takemura	63,535	15.3	
LDP	Bunmei Ibuki	56,450	13.6	
Kōmeitō	Katsuhiko Takeuchi	53,020	12.8	
JCP	Masaru Umeda	48,719	11.7	
JCP	Hiroko Fujiwara	42,049	10.1	
Independent	Munenori Ōwan	18,828	4.5	

1986
Party	Candidate	Votes	%	±%
LDP	Mikio Okuda	58,861	16.3	
LDP	Bunmei Ibuki	51,514	14.2	
Kōmeitō	Katsuhiko Takeuchi	51,315	14.2	
JCP	Hiroko Fujiwara	49,739	13.7	
DSP	Eiichi Nagasue	46,160	12.8	
JCP	Masaru Umeda	46,099	12.7	
JSP	Yukio Takemura	32,263	8.9	
NLC	Yamato Kaji	25,911	7.2	
