= Seiji Maehara =

Japanese politician (born 1962)

- 前原 誠司
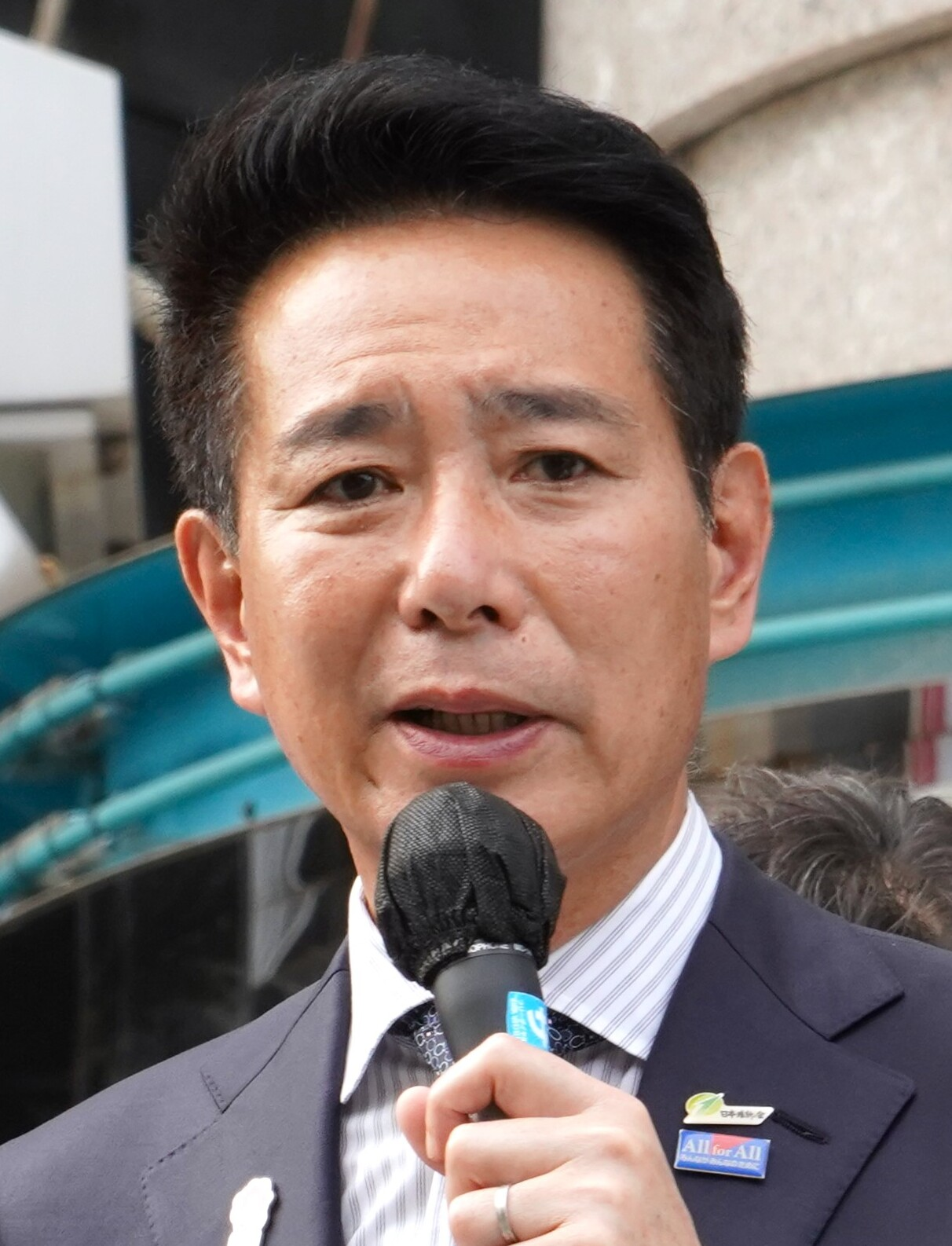
- Maehara in 2025

Co-leader of Nippon Ishin no Kai
- In office 1 December 2024 – 8 August 2025
- Leader: Hirofumi Yoshimura
- Preceded by: Hirofumi Yoshimura
- Succeeded by: Fujita Fumitake

Leader of Free Education for All
- In office 30 November 2023 – 3 October 2024
- Preceded by: Position established
- Succeeded by: Position abolished

President of the Democratic Party
- In office 1 September 2017 – 1 November 2017
- Preceded by: Renhō
- Succeeded by: Kohei Otsuka

President of the Democratic Party of Japan
- In office 17 September 2005 – 7 April 2006
- Preceded by: Katsuya Okada
- Succeeded by: Ichirō Ozawa

Minister of State for Economic and Fiscal Policy
- In office 1 October 2012 – 26 December 2012
- Prime Minister: Yoshihiko Noda
- Preceded by: Motohisa Furukawa
- Succeeded by: Akira Amari

Minister for Foreign Affairs
- In office 17 September 2010 – 7 March 2011
- Prime Minister: Naoto Kan
- Preceded by: Katsuya Okada
- Succeeded by: Yukio Edano (acting); Takeaki Matsumoto

Minister of Land, Infrastructure, Transport and Tourism
- In office 16 September 2009 – 17 September 2010
- Prime Minister: Yukio Hatoyama; Naoto Kan
- Preceded by: Kazuyoshi Kaneko
- Succeeded by: Sumio Mabuchi

Member of the House of Representatives
- Incumbent
- Assumed office 18 July 1993
- Preceded by: Eiichi Nagasue
- Constituency: Kyoto 1st (1993–1996); Kinki PR (1996–2000); Kyoto 2nd (2000–present)

Personal details
- Born: 30 April 1962 (age 64) Kyoto, Japan
- Party: Ishin (since 2024)
- Other political affiliations: JNP (1992–1994); NPS (1994–1998); DPJ (1998–2016); DP (2016–2017); Kibō (2017–2018); DPFP (2018–2023); FEFA (2023–2024)
- Education: Kyoto University (LLB)
- Website: Official website

Seiji Maehara (前原 誠司, Maehara Seiji; born 30 April 1962) is a Japanese politician who has served as a member of the House of Representatives of Japan since 1993. Maehara has served as a leader and a member of various political parties, and has run in several party leadership elections. As of 2026, he sits in the Diet as a member of Ishin no Kai.

Beginning his political career in Kyoto, Maehara was initially a member of smaller opposition parties before joining the Democratic Party of Japan (DPJ), serving as its leader from 2005 to 2006. After the DPJ was victorious in the 2009 general election, Maehara served as Minister of Land, Infrastructure, Transport and Tourism and Minister of Foreign Affairs under the cabinets of Prime Ministers Yukio Hatoyama and Naoto Kan, before resigning from the cabinet in March 2011 after he acknowledged receiving illegal donations from a South Korean national living in Japan. In 2016, Maehara contested for the leadership of the Democratic Party, the successor party of the DPJ, losing to Renho. He later replaced her as leader on 1 September 2017 until its dissolution later that month. After spending some time with Kibō no Tō and the Democratic Party for the People (DPFP), Maehara founded a new party in 2023, Free Education for All, which was broadly centrist and focused on building a coalition against the LDP. In preparation for the 2024 general election, the party merged with the Osaka-based Ishin no Kai party (Japan Innovation Party). Two months later, he was elected the party's co-leader and representative in the National Diet, serving alongside Osaka Governor Hirofumi Yoshimura. Maehara would resign the following summer to take responsibility for the party's lackluster results in the 2025 Upper House elections. Being succeed by Fujita Fumitake, Maehra has remained on the backbenches since.

Maehara is viewed as a "China war hawk" and a proponent of close ties with the United States. He is also often viewed as being politically conservative, while supporting socially liberal policies, such as the legalization of same-sex marriage.

== Early life and education ==
Maehara was born in Kyoto to parents from Tottori Prefecture.

He attended the law faculty of Kyoto University, where he majored in international politics. He attended the Matsushita Institute of Government and Management from 1987 to 1991.

== Early political career ==
=== Prefectural and National politics ===
Maehara won election to the Kyoto Prefectural Assembly in 1991 with the support of, among others, future Diet member Keiro Kitagami. At the time, he was the youngest prefectural assemblyman in Kyoto history.

He was elected to the House of Representatives as a member of the Japan New Party of Morihiro Hosokawa in 1993. In 1994, he left the party and formed the "Democratic Wave" with several other young parliamentarians, but later that year joined the Sakigake Party, which was briefly part of the majority government. In 1998, he joined the Democratic Party of Japan (DPJ) when it was formed that same year.

As a member of the DPJ he focused on security affairs and often negotiated with the government. In the shadow governments he has served as the Shadow Minister for Security Affairs and Shadow Minister for the Defense Agency.

=== President of the DPJ ===
After the crushing defeat of the DPJ in the 2005 snap election and the resignation of DPJ leader Katsuya Okada, the elected representatives of the party met to choose a new leader. The two candidates were Naoto Kan and Maehara. Maehara defeated the 58-year-old Kan by a razor-thin count of 96–94 in open balloting by party members from both Houses of the Diet, with two members abstaining and two others having cast invalid votes. Maehara was appointed DPJ president on 17 September 2005.

However, Maehara's term as party leader was short lived. Although he initially led the party's criticism of the Koizumi administration, particularly in regards to connections between LDP lawmakers and scandal-ridden Livedoor, the revelation that a fake email was used to try to establish this link greatly damaged his credibility. The scandal led to the resignation of Representative Hisayasu Nagata and of Maehara as party leader on 31 March. New elections for party leader were held on 7 April, in which Ichirō Ozawa was elected president.

== In government ==
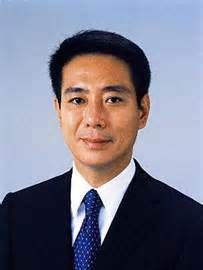
2009

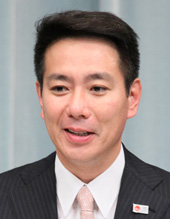
2010

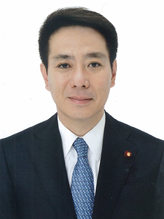
2011

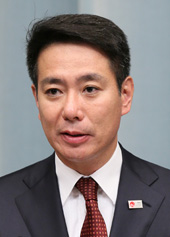
2012

Official portraits of Seiji Maehara

In the 2009 Japanese general election, the Democratic Party won a two-thirds majority of the House of Representatives, allowing the party to form a new government. Maehara subsequently joined the new cabinet.

=== Minister of Land, Infrastructure and Transport ===
Maehara was appointed Minister of Land, Infrastructure and Transport on 16 September 2009 by Prime Minister Yukio Hatoyama. In this role, he was the spokesman for a number of government initiatives, including:

- Cessation of construction work on Yamba Dam
- Opening Haneda Airport in Tokyo to long-haul international flights
- Bankruptcy restructuring of Japan Airlines
- Experimentation with reducing or eliminating tolls on the Japanese expressway network

=== Minister of Foreign Affairs ===
Then Prime Minister Naoto Kan reshuffled the cabinet effective 17 September 2010, making Maehara the youngest Minister of Foreign Affairs in postwar Japanese history. The main international relations event during his tenure as foreign minister was the 2010 Senkaku boat collision incident, which led to increased tensions between Japan and the People's Republic of China concerning their overlapping claims to the Senkaku Islands.

=== Resignation from the Cabinet ===
In March 2011, only four days before the 11 March earthquake and tsunami, Maehara resigned as Minister for Foreign Affairs after it emerged that he had accepted a political donation of ¥250,000 (approx. US$3,000) from a 72-year-old South Korean permanent resident of Japan who operated a restaurant in Kyoto. Maehara had known the woman since junior high school, but her foreign nationality made the donation illegal if it had been accepted intentionally. Maehara apologised to the nation for only holding the post for 6 months and for "provoking distrust" over his political funding. According to the Japan Times, the resignation would cause Japanese relations with the United States to weaken. The donation was revealed by an opposing party politician, Shoji Nishida; The Economist described the incident as a scandal based on a technicality that primarily illustrates the unsatisfactory treatment of Koreans in Japan.

=== Candidacy for Prime Minister ===
Following Kan's announced resignation in August 2011, Maehara initially planned to support Finance Minister Yoshihiko Noda, but broke off this support due to disagreement over whether to raise the consumption tax, and declared his own candidacy for the presidency of the DPJ on 22 August. He lost to Noda and Economy Minister Banri Kaieda in the first round of balloting on 29 August.

== In opposition ==
=== Leader of the Democratic Party ===
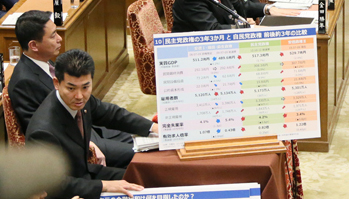
Maehara with Kenta Izumi in 2016.

In 2016, the DPJ merged with Japan Innovation Party forming the Democratic Party. Maehara attempted to make a comeback at the leadership in the first leadership election post-merger, but lost against former minister Renho.

Renho resigned in July 2017 after the DP suffered a bad result in the 2017 Tokyo assembly elections. A leadership election was immediately held to select the new leader of the party. Maehara was one of the candidates contesting the election, along with former Chief Cabinet Secretary Yukio Edano. Through his reliable support from conservative DP and former JIP members, Maehara comfortably won the leadership election with 60% of the points up for grabs. He returned as the leader of the largest opposition party almost 12 years after ascending to the post for the first time.

Maehara's second stint as president was short and rocky. One of his first acts as the new president was to appoint rising-star lawmaker Shiori Yamao as secretary-general in his new executive. Immediately after her nomination, tabloid magazine Shukan Bunshun published an allegation of affair against Yamao. Whilst the details were inconclusive, Yamao resigned from the party less than a week after the affair was reported, widely seen as an effort to halt further decline of DP's fledgling support. Maehara also faced a potential rival in Tokyo governor Yuriko Koike, who grew increasingly confident after her party's landslide win in the Tokyo Assembly elections and was rumoured of planning to form a conservative national party to face Prime Minister Shinzo Abe in the next general election.

Abe called a snap election less than three weeks to Maehara's ascension to the presidency. This threw the party into disarray, as it had not completed preparing its election platform. At the same day as Abe's election declaration, Koike finally launched a new party called Kibō no Tō (Party of Hope). Seeing Koike's high popularity at that time as a potential asset, Maehara coordinated with Koike on DP candidates' nominations for the election. Koike agreed to endorse DP candidates and Maehara effectively disbanded the party in order to allow the candidates run under the Kibō banner. However, despite Maehara's request, Koike imposed an ideological filter that effectively barred liberal-leaning members of the DP, such as Yukio Edano, from joining Kibō. This led Edano to form the Constitutional Democratic Party less than three weeks before election to house liberal DP members. Maehara himself ran as independent.

Koike's multiple blunders during the campaign led Kibō to fall well short of high initial expectations, becoming the second largest opposition party behind the Edano-led CDP. Maehara, whose political gamble had backfired, was under heavy pressure to resign from his position as DP president. Maehara resigned from his post and from the party on 28 October 2017, ending his tumultuous second term as leader of the Democratic Party.

=== DPFP and FEFA ===
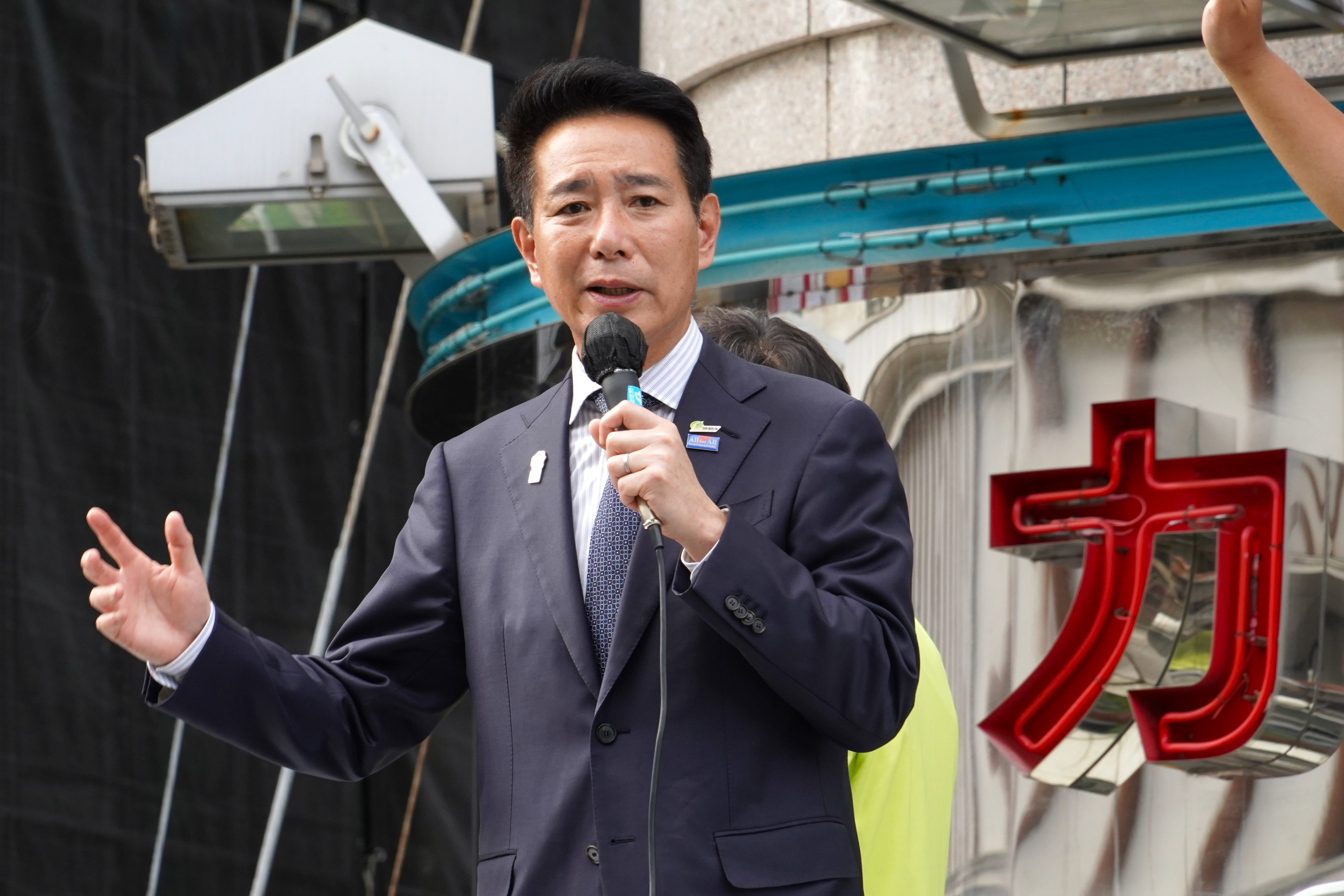
Maehara in June 2025.

Maehara joined Kibō in November 2017. When Kibō merged with the Democratic Party in May 2018 to form the Democratic Party for the People (DPFP), Maehara also joined the DPFP. He became critical of party leader Yuichiro Tamaki and his approach of collaborating with the LDP, and challenged Tamaki for the DPP leadership spot in 2023, claiming that he would focus on forming a collaborative front with other opposition parties outside of the JCP. Following his defeat to Tamaki, he and several other DPP parliamentarians, including former Governor Yukiko Kada, split from the group to form Free Education for All. The new party is believed to be focused on building an opposition coalition, but several difficulties have come up, including the closeness of Maehara to Nippon Ishin no Kai, to which a RENGO spokesman said that the Union would be forced to pull support from the new party if it is "swallowed up by Nippon Ishin". On 3 October 2024, the party merged into Nippon Ishin no Kai, with all, but Atsushi Suzuki, running under the Ishin banner.

=== Co-leader of Ishin no Kai ===
Maehara was elected as co-leader of Ishin after the 2024 general election. While Osaka Governor Hirofumi Yoshimura was elected party leader, Maehara was made the party's parliamentary representative in the National Diet.

He spoke at the Center for Strategic and International Studies in May 2025.

After the 2025 House of Councilors election, in which Ishin lost 2 seats in the Upper House, Maehara and three other party executives announced their intention to resign. After Maehara resigned as co-leader, former party Secretary-General Fujita Fumitake was elected to replace him on 8 August 2025.

Maehara was elected chairman of the House Committee on National Security in October 2025.

== Political positions ==
=== Constitutional reform and security policy ===
Maehara supports amending Article 9 of the Japanese Constitution. In his May 2025 address at the Center for Strategic and International Studies, he argued that constitutional amendment is necessary for Japan to assume defense obligations toward the United States, moving from "asymmetrical reciprocity to symmetrical reciprocity" in the US-Japan Security Treaty. He specifically supports explicitly recognizing the Japan Self-Defense Forces in the constitution and clearly stating "the right of self-defense and inherent right of the state, whether individual or collective."

As Foreign Minister in 2010, Maehara secured the first explicit US confirmation at the ministerial level that Article 5 of the Japan-US Security Treaty applies to the Senkaku Islands. In a joint press conference with then-Secretary of State Hillary Clinton, Clinton stated that "the Senkakus fall within the scope of Article 5 of the 1960 U.S.-Japan Treaty of Mutual Cooperation and Security."

=== US-Japan relations and defense spending ===
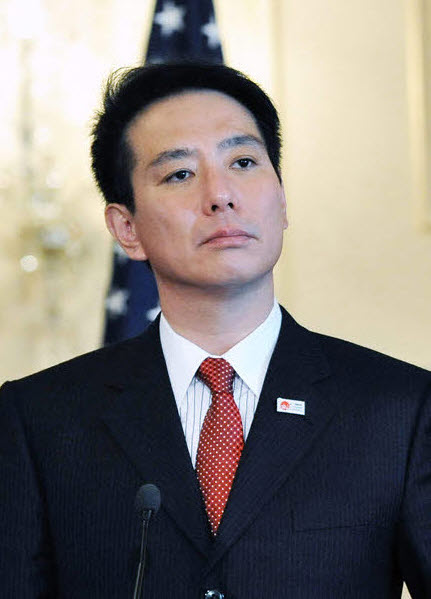
Maehara pictured at the US State Department in Washington, D.C., on 6 January 2010.

In April 2025, Maehara stated that the Japanese government should not pay more for the United States' military presence in the country, a demand made by President Donald Trump. However, he has argued that Japan should reconsider the current security treaty arrangement, noting that among US allies, "only Japan does not have a defense obligation towards the United States" while South Korea, the Philippines, and NATO members all have mutual defense obligations.

=== Economic policy ===
As Minister of State for Economic and Fiscal Policy in 2012, Maehara was critical of the Bank of Japan's monetary policy, pressing for more aggressive action to combat economic slowdown. He attended BOJ policy meetings as a government observer and called for "powerful policy easing to boost the economy."

As co-leader of the Japan Innovation Party, Maehara advocates for administrative reforms including "slimming administration, deregulation, and reviewing the relationship between national and local governments" while pursuing growth strategies that leverage private sector capabilities.

=== Education policy ===
Maehara is a strong proponent of tuition-free education, which has been a cornerstone policy of the Japan Innovation Party. He argues that Japan's education budget is inadequate, noting that among 38 OECD countries, Japan ranks second-lowest in public education expenditure as a percentage of GDP, with private expenditure comprising 63.4% of total education costs compared to the OECD average of 28.6%. Under his influence, Osaka Prefecture became the first in Japan to implement tuition-free high school and university education.

=== Political finance reform ===
Maehara has advocated for a ban on political donations by corporations.

== Personal life ==
Maehara met his wife, Ari, through Yasuyuki Nambu, the then-CEO of Pasona Group. Maehara credits Nambu for giving him the opportunity to meet his future wife. The couple met in June 1995 and have no children.

Maehara enjoys taking photographs of trains as a hobby. Despite belonging to different political parties, Maehara has a good personal relationship with former LDP President and Prime Minister Shigeru Ishiba; the two are known to bond over their shared love and appreciation of trains. He was also friends with former Prime Minister Shinzo Abe.

House of Representatives (Japan)
Preceded by Mikio Okuda; Eiichi Nagasue; Yukio Takemura; Bunmei Ibuki; Katsuhiko Takeuchi	Representative for Kyoto 1st district (multi-member); 1993–1996; Served alongside: Keiji Kokuta, Bunmei Ibuki, Yuzuru Takeuchi, Mikio Okuda	District eliminated
New constituency	Representative for the Kinki PR block 1996–2000	N/A
Preceded by Mikio Okuda	Representative for Kyoto 2nd district 2000–present	Incumbent
Preceded by Takashi Endo	Chairman of the Committee on National Security; 2025–2026	Succeeded by Akihiro Nishimura
Party political offices
Preceded by Katsuya Okada	Leader of the Democratic Party; 2005–2006	Succeeded by Ichirō Ozawa
Preceded by Renhō	Leader of the Democratic Party; 2017	Succeeded by Kohei Otsuka
Preceded by Hirofumi Yoshimura	Co-Leader of Nippon Ishin no Kai; 2024–2025	Succeeded by Fujita Fumitake
Preceded by Nobuyuki Baba	Head of the Diet Members Group, Nippon Ishin no Kai; 2024–2025	Succeeded by Fujita Fumitake
Political offices
Preceded by Kazuyoshi Kaneko	Minister of Land, Infrastructure, Transport and Tourism; 2009–2010	Succeeded by Sumio Mabuchi
Preceded by Katsuya Okada	Minister for Foreign Affairs; 2010–2011	Succeeded by Takeaki Matsumoto
