= Takashi Yano =

Japanese politician

- 矢野 隆司

Member of the House of Representatives
- In office 11 September 2005 – 21 July 2009
- Constituency: Kinki PR

Personal details
- Born: 29 August 1960 (age 66) Osaka, Japan
- Party: Liberal Democratic
- Education: Kwansei Gakuin University

Takashi Yano (矢野 隆司, Yano Takashi; born 29 August 1960) is a Japanese politician of the Liberal Democratic Party, a member of the House of Representatives in the Diet (national legislature). A native of Osaka, Osaka and graduate of Kwansei Gakuin University, he was elected to the House of Representatives for the first time in 2005.
