= Keiji Kokuta =

Japanese politician

- 穀田 恵二
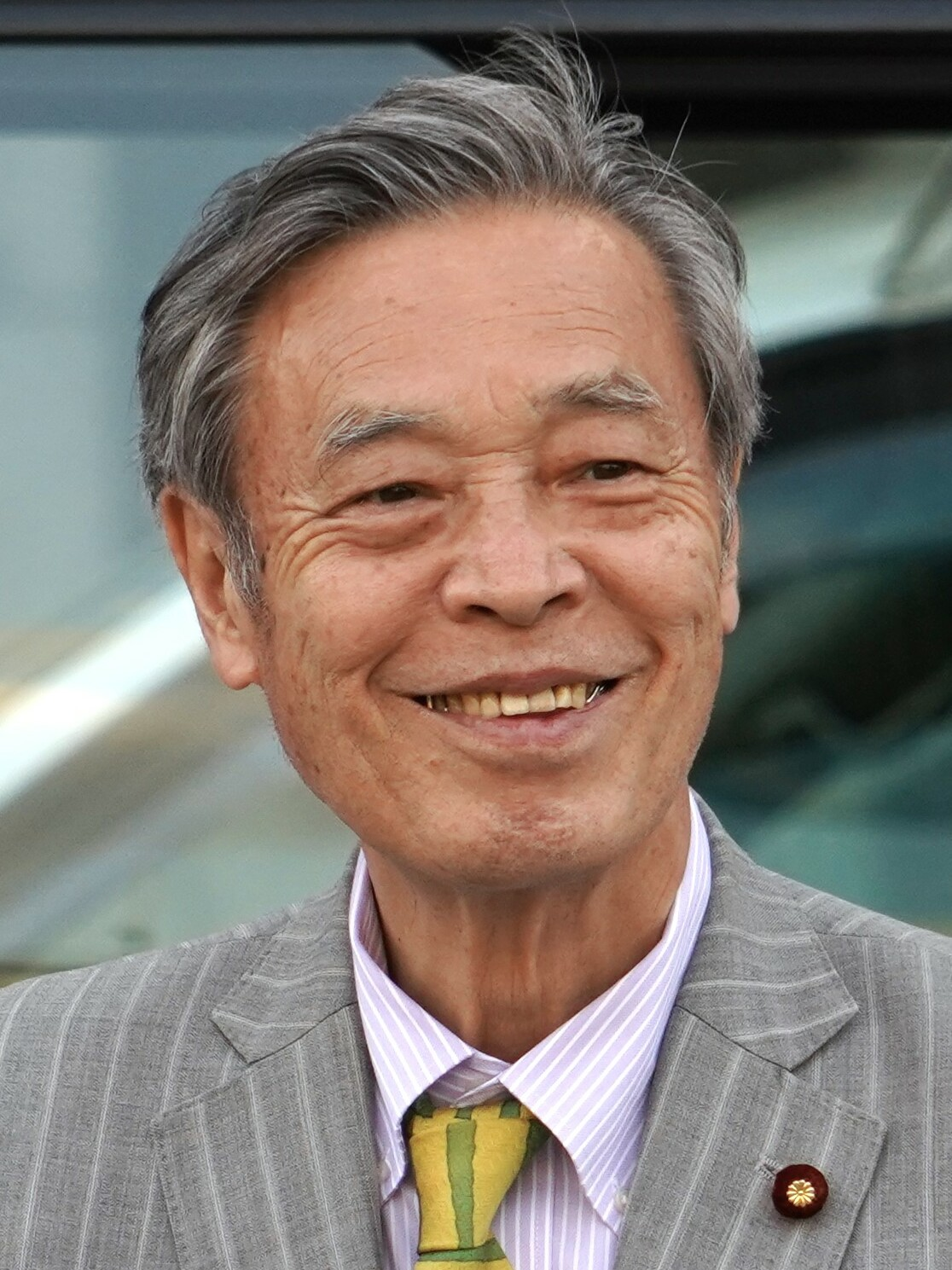
- Kokuta in 2023

Member of the House of Representatives
- In office 18 July 1993 – 9 October 2024
- Preceded by: Yukio Takemura
- Succeeded by: Multi-member district
- Constituency: Kyoto 1st (1993–1996); Kinki PR (1996–2024)

Member of the Kyoto City Assembly
- In office 1987–1991
- Constituency: Kita Ward

Personal details
- Born: 11 January 1947 (age 79) Mizusawa, Iwate, Japan
- Party: Communist
- Education: Ritsumeikan University
- Website: kokuta-keiji.jp

Keiji Kokuta (穀田 恵二, Kokuta Keiji; born 11 January 1947) is a Japanese politician and a former member of the House of Representatives for the Japanese Communist Party. He served 10 terms in the Japanese House of Representatives.

He has served as a member of various committees, including the Budget Committee, the Committee on Local Administration, the Special Committee on Disaster Prevention, and the Special Committee on Ethical Elections. He is currently the Chairman of the Party's Diet Strategy Committee, Chairman of the Election Strategy Committee, a member of the Permanent Executive Committee, and the head of the Committee for the Promotion of Traditional Crafts.

House of Representatives (Japan)
New title Introduction of proportional representation	Representative for the Kinki PR block 1996–2024	
Preceded by Mikio Okuda; Eiichi Nagasue; Yukio Takemura; Bunmei Ibuki; Katsuhiko Takeuchi	Representative for Kyoto 1st district 1993–1996; Served alongside: Seiji Maehara, Bunmei Ibuki, Yuzuru Takeuchi, Mikio Okuda	District eliminated
