= Alex Saito =

Spanish-Japanese politician (born 1985)

- 斎藤 アレックス
- Official portrait, 2026

Member of the House of Representatives
- Incumbent
- Assumed office 5 November 2021
- Preceded by: Multi-member district
- Constituency: Kinki PR (2021–2024); Shiga 1st (2024–2026); Kinki PR (2026–present)

Personal details
- Born: 30 June 1985 (age 41) Madrid, Spain
- Party: Ishin (since 2024)
- Other political affiliations: DPP (2018–2023); FEFA (2023–2024)
- Education: Doshisha University
- Website: saitoalex.com

Alex Saito (斎藤 アレックス, Saitō Arekkusu, born 30 June 1985) is a Spanish-Japanese politician who has served as a member of the House of Representatives of Japan since 2021. A member of Ishin no Kai (Japan Innovation Party) since 2024, Saito represented the Kinki proportional representation block from 2021 to 2024 as member of the Democratic Party For the People (DPFP), and has represented Shiga 1st district since 2025.

== Early life ==
Saito was born in Madrid, Spain on 30 June 1985 to a Spanish father and a Japanese mother. He moved to Japan in 1990, growing up in Osaka and Moriguchi in Osaka Prefecture. In 1999, due to economic downturn caused by the Lost Decades, his father's restaurant in Osaka closed and he returned to Spain, leaving Saito with a single-parent household. After observing his mother's hardships as a single parent amidst Japan's economic stagnation, Saito decided to pursue a career in politics.

== Political career ==
After graduating from the Faculty of Economics at Doshisha University, Saito worked at a security company before entering the Matsushita School of Government and Management in 2013, where he interned with U.S. Representative Chuck Fleischman and graduated in 2017. On April of the same year, Saito began serving as a secretary to House of Representatives member Seiji Maehara. In October 2018, the Democratic Party for the People announced that it would field Saito as a candidate in a constituency in Kyoto Prefecture for the 2019 Japanese House of Councillors election. However, the Constitutional Democratic Party also decided to field a candidate in the same constituency. In order to avoid splitting the votes between the two parties, Saito withdrew his candidacy in April 2019.

In the 2021 Japanese general election, Saito ran as a candidate for the DPFP. Although he lost to Toshitaka Ooka of the Liberal Democratic Party in the Shiga 1st district election, he was elected through the Kinki proportional representation block.

On 30 November 2023, Saito alongside 4 other members split from the DPFP to become a founding member of Free Education for All, in which he was appointed as Chairman of Political Affairs Research. In October 2024, it was announced that he had joined Nippon Ishin no Kai and would stand for the party in the 2024 election in the Shiga 1st district. In this instance, he won the rematch defeating the LDP's Ooka to win the district.

In 2025 Saito was made Chairman of the party’s Policy Research Council, as part of a wider leadership change in response to disappointing results in the Upper House election held that July.

== Political positions ==
Regarding amending Article 9 of the Constitution, which renounces Japan's right to wage offensive war, Saito stated in 2021 that he was "somewhat opposed" while being "somewhat in favor" of amending the Constitution to explicitly mention the Self-Defense Forces.

Saito supports the legalization of same-sex marriage in Japan.

Saito is an advocate for reducing dependence on nuclear energy.

== Electoral history ==
2024
Party	Candidate	Votes	%	±%
Ishin	Alex Saito	74,126	43.0	
LDP	Toshitaka Ōoka (elected in Kinki PR block)	70,033	40.6	▼11.9
JCP	Akiko Kinose	28,359	16.4	
Registered electors		323,530		
Turnout			55.10	▼3.80
Ishin gain from LDP				

House of Representatives (Japan)
Preceded by Multi member district	Representative for Kinki proportional representation block 2021–2024	Succeeded by Multi member district
Preceded by Toshitaka Ōoka	Representative for Shiga 1st 2024–present	Incumbent
Party political offices
Preceded by Hitoshi Aoyagi	Chairman of the Policy Research Council; 2025-present	Incumbent
