= Terufumi Horiuchi =

Japanese politician

- 堀内 照文

Member of the House of Representatives
- In office 19 December 2014 – 28 September 2017
- Constituency: Kinki PR

Personal details
- Born: 2 November 1972 (age 53) Osaka, Japan
- Party: Communist
- Education: Kobe University

Terufumi Horiuchi (堀内 照文, Horiuchi Terufumi; born November 2, 1972) is a member of the Japanese Communist Party, former serving in the House of Representatives.

He was born in the center of the Osaka (the second largest metropolitan area in Japan) in 1972. He graduated from Shumiyoshi High School, and Kobe University in 1991.

He was elected to this position in 2014, representing the Kinki region. Horiuchi was critical of Prime Minister Shinzo Abe's plan to reduce the turnover rate of people giving up their jobs to care for the elderly to zero by improving nursing care as unrealistic. He said that to make Abe's policy work, one would need to increase the wages of those working in nursing care and to give more state funding to facilities.
