= Tatsuo Kawabata =

Japanese politician (born 1945)

- 川端 達夫
- Official portrait, 2009

Vice Speaker of the House of Representatives
- In office 24 December 2014 – 28 September 2017
- Speaker: Nobutaka Machimura; Tadamori Ōshima
- Preceded by: Hirotaka Akamatsu
- Succeeded by: Hirotaka Akamatsu

Minister for Internal Affairs and Communications
- In office 2 September 2011 – 1 October 2012
- Prime Minister: Yoshihiko Noda
- Preceded by: Yoshihiro Katayama
- Succeeded by: Shinji Tarutoko

Minister of State for Science and Technology Policy
- In office 7 January 2010 – 17 September 2010
- Prime Minister: Yukio Hatoyama; Naoto Kan
- Preceded by: Naoto Kan
- Succeeded by: Banri Kaieda

Minister of Education, Culture, Sports, Science and Technology
- In office 16 September 2009 – 17 September 2010
- Prime Minister: Yukio Hatoyama; Naoto Kan
- Preceded by: Ryū Shionoya
- Succeeded by: Yoshiaki Takaki

Member of the House of Representatives
- In office 15 May 2014 – 28 September 2017
- Preceded by: Taizō Mikazuki
- Succeeded by: Multi-member district
- Constituency: Kinki PR
- In office 7 July 1986 – 16 November 2012
- Preceded by: Hachirō Nishida
- Succeeded by: Toshitaka Ōoka
- Constituency: Shiga at-large (1986–1996); Shiga 1st (1996–2005); Kinki PR (2005–2009); Shiga 1st (2009–2012)

Personal details
- Born: 24 January 1945 (age 81) Gamō, Shiga, Japan
- Party: Democratic (1998–2016)
- Other political affiliations: DSP (1986–1996); New Frontier (1996–1998); New Fraternity (1998); DP (2016–2018)
- Education: Kyoto University

Tatsuo Kawabata (川端 達夫, Kawabata Tatsuo; born 24 January 1945) is a former Japanese politician from the Democratic Party. A native of Ōmihachiman, Shiga, he attended Kyoto University and received a master's degree from it. His elder brother is former mayor of Ōmihachiman Gohei Kawabata.

== Early life ==
Born in Gamō-gun, Shiga Prefecture (now Ōmihachiman city). He graduated from Shiga Prefectural Hikone East High School, Kyoto University Faculty of Engineering. He joined Toray after completing a master's program at the Graduate School of Engineering, Kyoto University. Besides being involved in development research, he also worked on the trade union movement.

== Political career ==
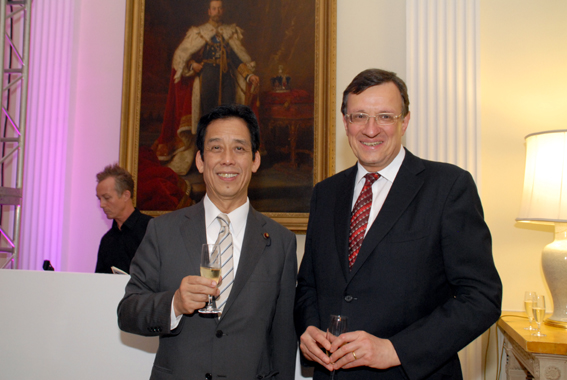
Kawabata with UK ambassador David Warren in 2012

Kawabata served as a member of the House of Representatives in the Diet (national legislature) from 1986 to 2012 and from 2014 to 2017.

In September 2011 Kawabata was appointed as Minister of Internal Affairs and Communications in the cabinet of newly appointed prime minister Yoshihiko Noda. He was relieved from the post on 1 October 2012. In September 2017, Kawabata announced that he would not run in the 2017 general election and would retire from politics.

House of Representatives (Japan)
| Preceded by Sōsuke Uno; Ganri Yamashita; Kōichi Noguchi; Hiroyoshi Sezaki; Hachirō Nishida | Member of the House of Representatives from the Shiga at-large district 1986–1996; Served alongside: Masayoshi Takemura, Ganri Yamashita, Sōsuke Uno, Tsutomu Yamamoto | Constituency abolished |
| New constituency | Member of the House of Representatives from Shiga 1st district (single-member); 1996–2005 | Succeeded by Kenichiro Ueno |
| Preceded by 29-member block | Member of the House of Representatives from the Kinki proportional block 2005–2009 | Succeeded by 29-member block |
| Preceded by Kenichiro Ueno | Member of the House of Representatives from Shiga 1st district (single-member); 2009–2012 | Succeeded by Toshitaka Ōoka |
| Preceded by 29-member block (vacancy created by Taizō Mikazuki, DPJ list) | Member of the House of Representatives from the Kinki proportional block 2014–2017 | Succeeded by Yukiko Kada |
Political offices
| Preceded by Ryū Shionoya | Minister of Education, Culture, Sports, Science and Technology; 2009–2010 | Succeeded by Yoshiaki Takaki |
| Preceded by Naoto Kan | Minister of State for Science and Technology Policy; 2010 | Succeeded by Banri Kaieda |
| Preceded by Yoshihiro Katayama | Minister for Internal Affairs and Communications; 2011–2012 | Succeeded by Shinji Tarutoko |
