= Kazunori Yamanoi =

Japanese politician (born 1962)

- 山井 和則
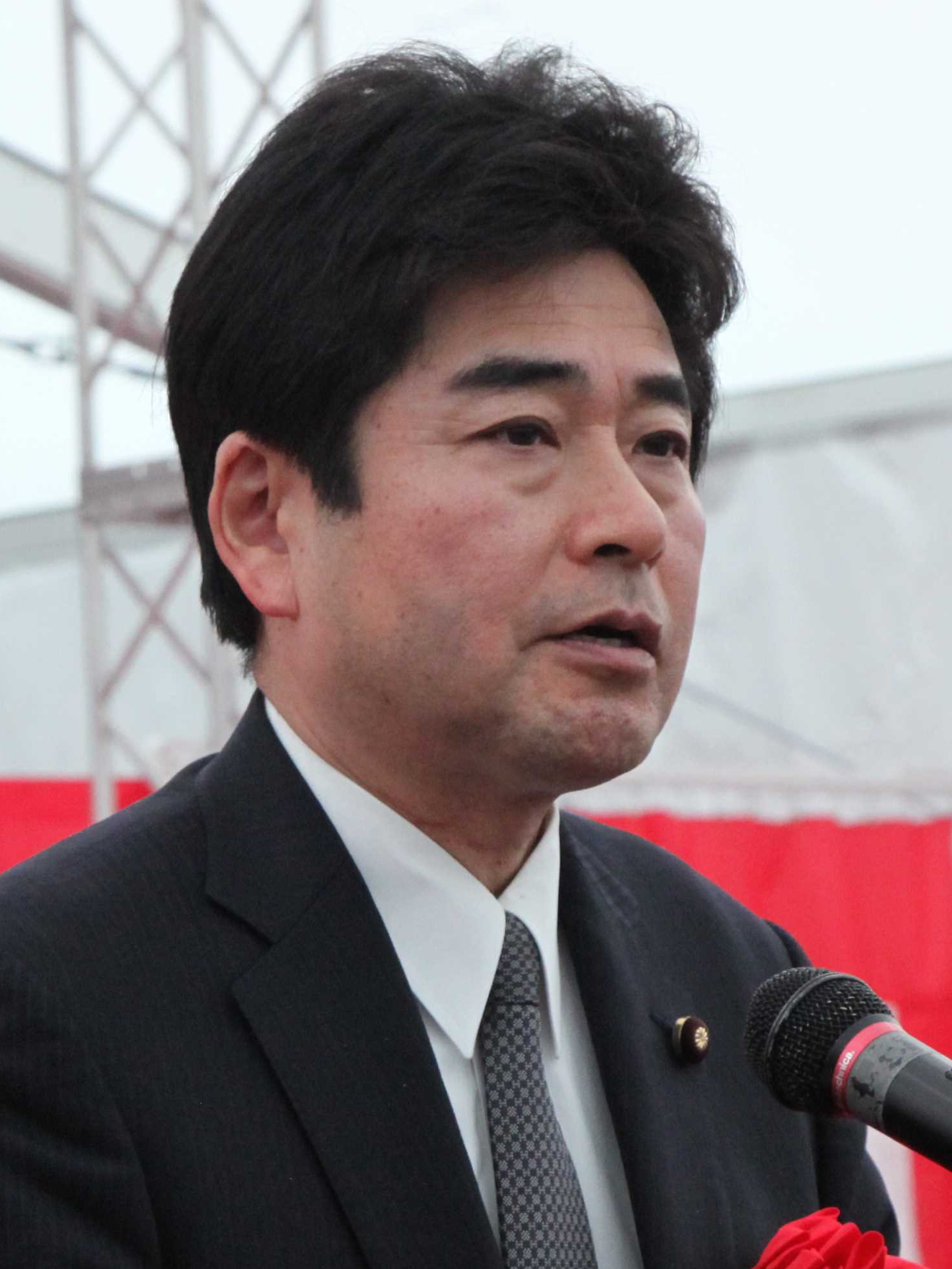
- Yamanoi in 2023

Spokesperson of the Centrist Reform Alliance
- Incumbent
- Assumed office 15 January 2026
- Co-leaders: Yoshihiko Noda; Tetsuo Saito
- Preceded by: Office established

Member of the House of Representatives
- In office 26 June 2000 – 23 January 2026
- Preceded by: Multi-member district
- Succeeded by: Hiromichi Sonosaki
- Constituency: Kinki PR (2000–2003); Kyoto 6th (2003–2017); Kinki PR (2017–2021); Kyoto 6th (2021–2026)

Personal details
- Born: 6 January 1962 (age 64) Osaka, Japan
- Party: CRA (since 2026)
- Other political affiliations: DP 1996 (1996–1998); DPJ (1998–2016); DP 2016 (2016–2017); KnT (2017–2018); DPP (2018–2019); Independent (2019–2020); CDP (2020–2026)
- Education: Kyoto University
- Website: yamanoi.net

Kazunori Yamanoi (山井 和則, Yamanoi Kazunori; born 6 January 1962) is a Japanese politician of the Centrist Reform Alliance, who serves as a member of the House of Representatives in the Diet (national legislature). A native of Osaka, he attended Kyoto University as both undergraduate and graduate. He also studied at Lund University in Sweden for two years. Yamanoi was elected to the House of Representatives for the first time in 2000 and served as Parliamentary Vice-Minister of Health, Labour and Welfare in the Yukio Hatoyama and Naoto Kan Cabinets from 2009 to 2010.
