= Satoshi Inoue (politician) =

Japanese politician

- 井上 哲士
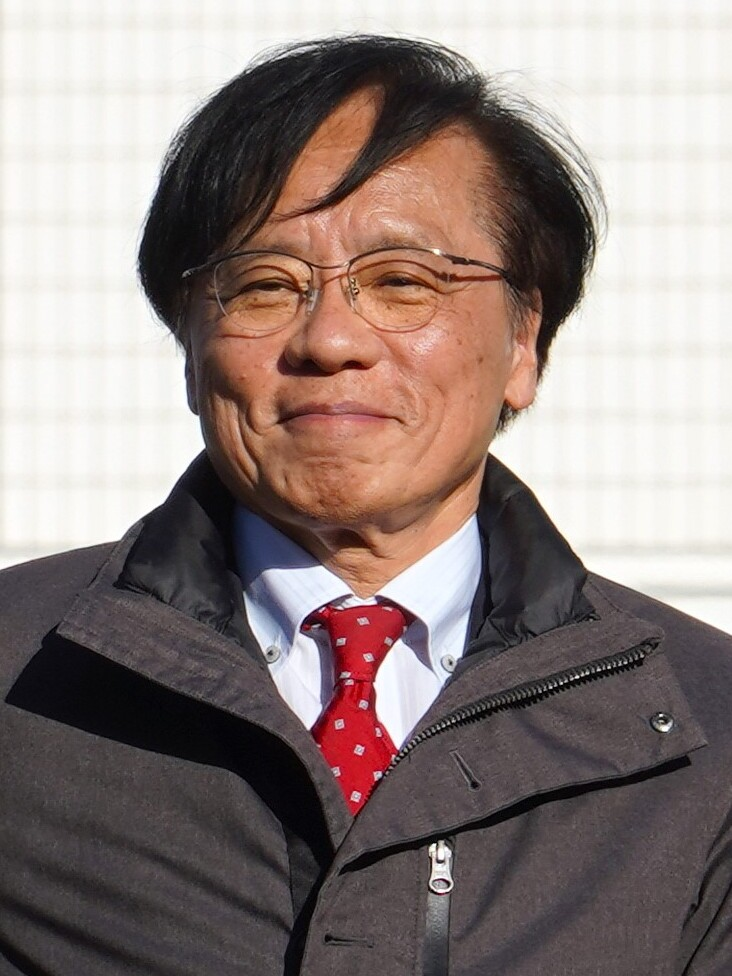
- Inoue in 2025

Member of the House of Councillors
- In office 29 July 2001 – 28 July 2025
- Constituency: National PR

Personal details
- Born: 8 August 1958 (age 67) Tokuyama, Yamaguchi, Japan
- Party: Communist
- Education: Kyoto University
- Website: inoue-satoshi.com

Satoshi Inoue (井上 哲士, Inoue Satoshi; born 5 May 1958 in Yamaguchi Prefecture) is a Japanese politician and a former member of the House of Councillors for the Japanese Communist Party. He had elected to this position forth times, in 2001, 2007, 2013, and 2019.
