= Bunmei Ibuki =

Japanese politician (born 1938)

- 伊吹 文明
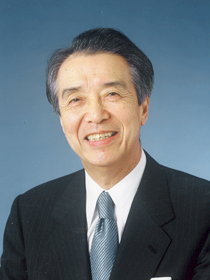
- Official portrait, 2006

Speaker of the House of Representatives
- In office 26 December 2012 – 21 November 2014
- Monarch: Akihito
- Deputy: Hirotaka Akamatsu
- Preceded by: Takahiro Yokomichi
- Succeeded by: Nobutaka Machimura
Ministerial offices
Minister of Finance
In office 2 August 2008 – 24 September 2008
Prime Minister	Yasuo Fukuda
Preceded by	Fukushiro Nukaga
Succeeded by	Shōichi Nakagawa
Minister of Education, Culture, Sports, Science and Technology
In office 26 September 2006 – 26 September 2007
Prime Minister	Shinzo Abe
Preceded by	Kenji Kosaka
Succeeded by	Kisaburo Tokai
Chairman of the National Public Safety Commission
In office 5 December 2000 – 26 April 2001
Prime Minister	Yoshirō Mori
Preceded by	Mamoru Nishida
Succeeded by	Jin Murai
Minister of Labour
In office 11 September 1997 – 30 July 1998
Prime Minister	Ryutaro Hashimoto
Preceded by	Yutaka Okano
Succeeded by	Akira Amari
Party political offices
Secretary-General of the Liberal Democratic Party
In office 24 September 2007 – 1 August 2008
President	Yasuo Fukuda
Preceded by	Tarō Asō
Succeeded by	Tarō Asō

Member of the House of Representatives
- In office 19 December 1983 – 14 October 2021
- Preceded by: Isaji Tanaka
- Succeeded by: Yasushi Katsume
- Constituency: Former Kyoto 1st (1983–1996); Kyoto 1st (1996–2009); Kinki PR (2009–2012); Kyoto 1st (2012–2021)

Personal details
- Born: 9 January 1938 (age 88) Shimogyō, Kyoto, Japan
- Party: Liberal Democratic
- Education: Kyoto University

Bunmei Ibuki (伊吹 文明, Ibuki Bunmei; born 9 January 1938) is a retired Japanese politician who served as the Speaker of the House of Representatives from 2012 to 2014.

== Early life and career ==
He was born in Kyoto to a family of textile wholesalers who had operated the business since the Edo period. He graduated with a BA from Kyoto University's economics department in 1960. At Kyoto University he was a member of the tennis club. Upon graduation Ibuki became a bureaucrat at the Ministry of Finance. He was dispatched to the Japanese embassy in London in 1965, where he stayed for four years.

== Political career ==
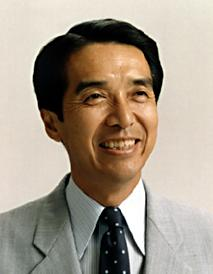
Ibuki in 1997

Ibuki entered politics in 1983 at former Finance Minister Michio Watanabe's behest. He is a member of the Liberal Democratic Party (LDP) and has served in a variety of government positions, including Minister of Labour (1997~98) and National Public Safety Commission chairman (2000~01).

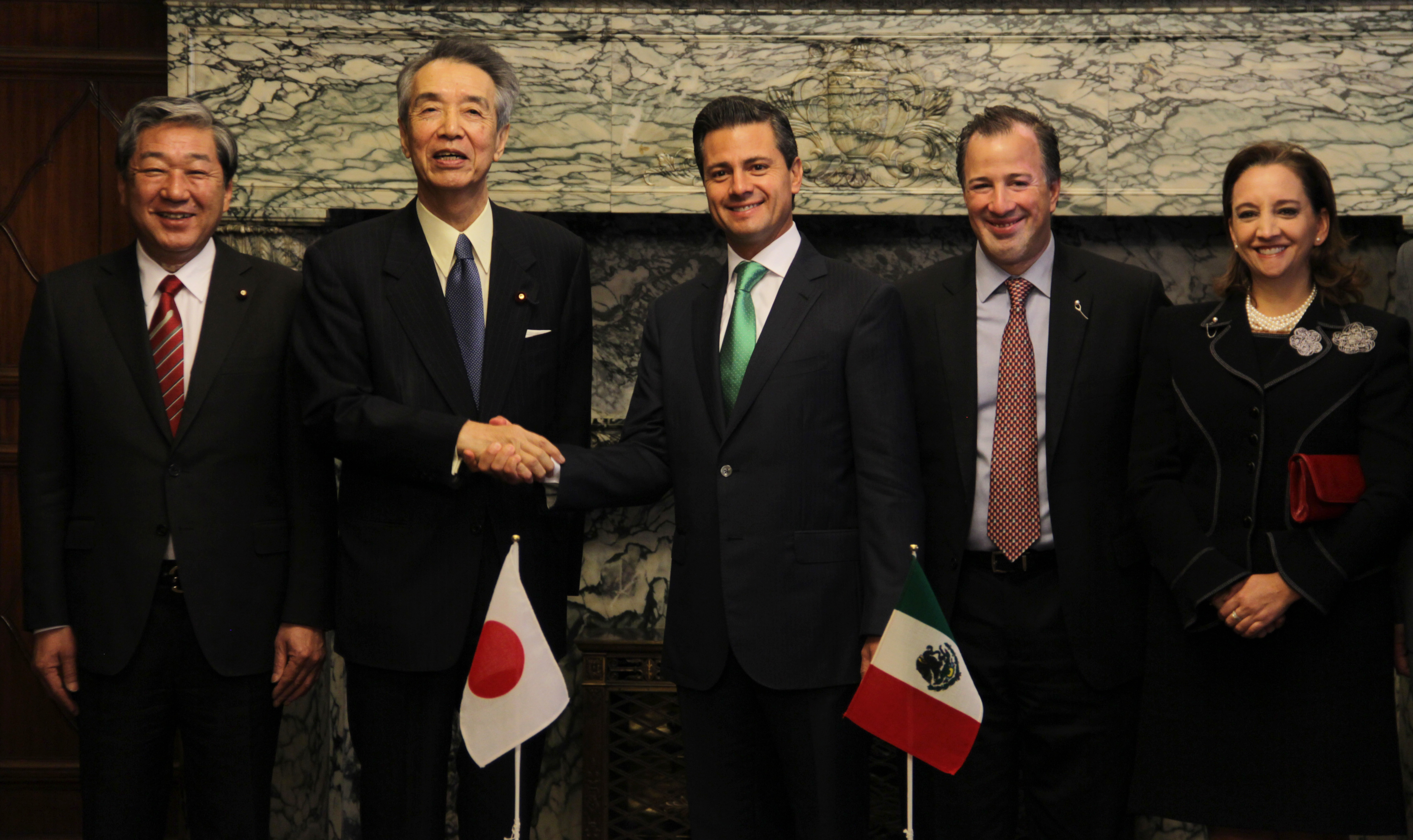
Ibuki with Enrique Peña Nieto in 2013

He was appointed Minister of Education, Culture, Sports, Science and Technology on 26 September 2006 as a part of Prime Minister Shinzō Abe's first cabinet. In this position, he promoted the controversial revision of the Fundamental Law of Education. He was subsequently appointed as Secretary-General of the LDP in September 2007; less than a year later, he was replaced in that position by Taro Aso and was instead appointed as Minister of Finance. He is known for his knowledge of finance and tax and welfare policies. He held the post of Finance Minister for less than two months, however, and was replaced by Shōichi Nakagawa in the Cabinet of Prime Minister Taro Aso, appointed on 24 September 2008.

On 26 December 2012, Bunmei Ibuki was elected Speaker of the House of Representatives of Japan. He presided over the day of his inauguration, the election of Prime Minister Shinzō Abe.

== Personal life ==
- Ibuki is a fluent English speaker. He is a member of the openly revisionist lobby Nippon Kaigi, and affiliated to the fundamentalist shinto lobby Shinto Seiji Renmei Kokkai Giin Kondankai (神道政治連盟国会議員懇談会).
- Ibuki is nicknamed "Ibu-King" due to his enduring political influence despite his now-advanced age.

== Election history ==
Election	Age	District	Political party	Number of votes	election results
1983 Japanese general election	45	Kyoto 1st district	LDP	58,059	winning
1986 Japanese general election	48	Kyoto 1st district	LDP	51,514	winning
1990 Japanese general election	52	Kyoto 1st district	LDP	56,450	winning
1993 Japanese general election	55	Kyoto 1st district	LDP	48,893	winning
1996 Japanese general election	58	Kyoto 1st district	LDP	63,094	winning
2000 Japanese general election	62	Kyoto 1st district	LDP	86,490	winning
2003 Japanese general election	65	Kyoto 1st district	LDP	83,644	winning
2005 Japanese general election	67	Kyoto 1st district	LDP	112,848	winning
2009 Japanese general election	71	Kyoto 1st district	LDP	81,913	elected by PR
2012 Japanese general election	74	Kyoto 1st district	LDP	69,287	winning
2014 Japanese general election	76	Kyoto 1st district	LDP	73,684	winning
2017 Japanese general election	79	Kyoto 1st district	LDP	88,106	winning

== Honours ==
- Japan: Grand Cordon of the Order of the Paulownia Flowers (29 April 2022)
- Netherlands: Knight Grand Cross of the Order of Orange-Nassau (29 October 2014)

Political offices
Preceded by Yutaka Okano	Minister of Labour; 1997–1998	Succeeded by Akira Amari
Preceded by Osamu Nishida	Chairman of the National Public Safety Commission; 2000–2001	Succeeded by Jin Murai
New title	Minister of State for Disaster Management; 2001	Succeeded by Jin Murai
Preceded by Kenji Kosaka	Minister of Education, Culture, Sports, Science and Technology; 2006–2007	Succeeded by Kisaburō Tokai
Preceded by Fukushiro Nukaga	Minister of Finance; 2008	Succeeded by Shoichi Nakagawa
Preceded by Takahiro Yokomichi	Speaker of the House of Representatives of Japan; 2012–2014	Succeeded by Nobutaka Machimura
Party political offices
Preceded by Taro Aso	Secretary-General of the Liberal Democratic Party; 2007–2008	Succeeded by Taro Aso
