= Yuzuru Takeuchi =

Japanese politician (born 1958)

- 竹内 譲
- Official portrait, 2015

Member of the House of Representatives
- In office 30 August 2009 – 23 January 2026
- Constituency: Kinki PR
- In office 18 July 1993 – 27 September 1996
- Preceded by: Katsuhiko Takeuchi
- Succeeded by: Constituency abolished
- Constituency: Kyoto 1st

Member of the Kyoto City Assembly
- In office 1999–2005
- Constituency: Kamigyō Ward

Personal details
- Born: 25 June 1958 (age 68) Kyoto, Japan
- Party: Komeito
- Other political affiliations: CGP (1993–1994); NFP (1994–1998)
- Education: Kyoto University

Yuzuru Takeuchi (竹内譲, Takeuchi Yuzuru; born 25 June 1958) is a Japanese politician. He had been a member of the House of Representatives from 2009 to 2026, having previously served from 1993 to 1996. He has served as chairman of the internal affairs and communications committee since 2024.
