= Kinki proportional representation block =

Japanese House of Representatives constituency

Kinki Proportional Representation Block
- Parliamentary constituency for the Japanese House of Representatives
- Map of House of Representatives proportional blocks, with the Kinki block highlighted
- Prefectures: Osaka, Kyoto, Hyōgo, Shiga, Nara, and Wakayama
- Electorate: 16,761,917 (2026)

Current constituency
- Created: 1994
- Number of members: 28

Kinki proportional representation block (Japanese: 比例代表近畿ブロック, Hepburn: Hirei Daihyō Kinki Burokku) is one of eleven proportional representation (PR) "blocks", multi-member constituencies for the House of Representatives in the Diet of Japan. It consists of the Kinki (or Kansai) region, and consists of the prefectures of Osaka, Kyoto, Hyōgo, Shiga, Nara, and Wakayama. Following the introduction of proportional voting, Kinki elected 33 representatives by PR in the 1996 general election, reduced to 30 in the election of 2000 when the total number of PR seats was reduced from 200 to 180. Kinki was reduced to 29 seats in 2003, and again to 28 in 2017.

== Overview ==
Kinki is usually defined as comprising the following regions: Osaka Prefecture, Hyōgo Prefecture, Kyoto Prefecture, Shiga Prefecture, Nara Prefecture, Wakayama Prefecture, and Mie Prefecture. While Wakayama is in the Kinki proportional representation block, Mie is in the Tōkai proportional representation block.

This block, comprising 20.7 million people and 28 seats, is the largest proportional representation group in Japan by both population and the number of seats. As it holds the most seats, the required vote quota to secure a seat here is lower than in other blocks. Nevertheless, political parties must nominate more candidates than 10% of the total seats to comply with the Public Offices Election Law.

== Results timeline ==
=== Vote share ===
Party	1996	2000	2003	2005	2009	2012	2014	2017	2021	2024	2026
NFP	33.04										
LDP	28.37	23.68	30.69	36.79	23.23	23.86	28.91	30.62	25.67	20.72	30.41
JCP	17.48	15.81	10.75	9.67	9.56	7.52	12.84	9.31	7.85	7.32	5.14
DPJ (Note: 1996 DP)	13.89	23.34	37.11	29.02	42.41	12.03	12.40				
SDP	6.16	9.13	4.07	5.70	3.68	1.36	1.47	0.93	1.08	1.12	0.80
NPS	2.67										
Komeito		16.07	17.39	14.95	12.98	12.66	14.64	13.79	12.32	11.62	
LP		9.52									
Nippon				3.87	1.20						
Your					4.17	6.52					
PNP					1.56						
Ishin (Note: 2012 JRP, 2014 JIP)						30.76	26.08	18.29	33.91	23.34	23.20
TPJ						4.94					
PLP							1.15				
CDP								15.81	11.63	14.06	
KnT								10.82			
DPFP									3.24	8.34	6.97
Reiwa									3.12	6.29	2.64
Sanseitō										3.95	6.75
CPJ										3.25	2.77
Centrist Reform Alliance											14.26
Mirai											5.92
Others	2.27 (Note: NSP 1.40, LL 0.66, DRP 0.21)	2.44 (Note: NCP 1.36, LL 1.08)			1.24 (Note: HRP 0.72, NRP 0.52)	0.34 (Note: HRP 0.34)	2.50 (Note: Generations 2.08, HRP 0.42)	0.44 (Note: HRP 0.44)	1.19 (Note: NHK 1.19)	1.13 (Note: Genyu 1.13)	
Turnout		59.05	57.42	66.61	67.82	59.11	51.32	50.00	56.06	53.69	56.45

=== Seat distribution ===
Election	Distribution	Seats
1996		33
2000		30
2003		29
2005		29
2009		29
2012		29
2014		29
2017		28
2021		28
2024		28
2026		28

== MPs elected ==
選挙回	1996	2000	2003	2005	2009	2012	2014	2017	2021
#1	Yasuko Ikenobō (New Frontier)	Sanae Takaichi (LDP)	Kazuya Tamaki (DPJ)	Mitsue Kondo (LDP)	Takanori Ohnishi (DPJ)	Hideo Higashikokubaru →Koichiro Shimizu (Restoration)	Takashi Nagao (LDP)	Shinsuke Ono (LDP)	Kee Miki (Ishin)
#2	Ryotaro Tanose (LDP)	Kazunori Yamanoi (DPJ)	Takuji Yanagimoto (LDP)	Shingo Nishimura (DPJ)	Mitsue Kondo (LDP)	Hirofumi Kado (LDP)	Sakihito Ozawa (Innovation)	Natsue Mori (Ishin)	Shinsuke Okuno (LDP)
#3	Mitsuo Higashinaka (JCP)	Yasuko Ikenobo (Kōmeitō)	Hajime Ishii (DPJ)	Nobuko Iwaki (LDP)	Mai Ohara (DPJ)	Shingo Nishimura （Restoration）	Yuzuru Takeuchi (Kōmeitō)	Hiroyuki Moriyama (CDP)	Yuichiro Wada (Ishin)
#4	Mikio Omi (New Frontier)	Keiji Kokuta (JCP)	Yasuko Ikenobo (Kōmeitō)	Yasuko Ikenobo (Kōmeitō)	Kimiyoshi Tamaki (DPJ)	Yuzuru Takeuchi (Kōmeitō)	Hiroyuki Ōnishi (LDP)	Noboru Kamitani (LDP)	Akira Yanagimoto (LDP)
#5	Shigehiko Okuyama (LDP)	Takuji Yanagimoto (LDP)	Masahiro Morioka (LDP)	Takeaki Matsumoto (DPJ)	Yasuko Ikenobo (Kōmeitō)	Kenta Izumi (DPJ)	Yasushi Adachi (Innovation)	Yuzuru Takeuchi (Kōmeitō)	Yuzuru Takeuchi (Kōmeitō)
#6	Satoru Ienishi (Democratic)	Tsutomu Yamamoto (DPJ)	Yasuhiro Kajiwara (DPJ)	Takuji Yanagimoto (LDP)	Takui Yanagimoto (LDP)	Naokazu Takemoto (LDP)	Keiji Kokuta (JCP)	Shinji Tarutoko →Sumio Mabuchi (Kibō)	Shū Sakurai (CDP)
#7	Tetsushi Kubo (New Frontier)	Shingo Nishimura (Liberal)	Ikuko Ishii (JCP)	Keiro Kitagami (DPJ)	Hideko Muroi (DPJ)	Naoto Sakaguchi (Restoration)	Kenta Izumi →Yoshiro Kitagami (DPJ)	Yukari Sato (LDP)	Hiroki Sumiyoshi (Ishin)
#8	Keisuke Sunada (LDP)	Tomoko Nakagawa (SDP)	Yuriko Koike (LDP)	Ikuko Ishii (JCP)	Keiji Kokuta (JCP)	Yasuhide Nakayama (LDP)	Noboru Kamitani (LDP)	Keiji Kokuta (JCP)	Masaki Ōgushi (LDP)
#9	Keiji Kokuta (JCP)	Nishi Hiroyoshi (Kōmeitō)	Fusaho Izumi (DPJ)	Osamu Uno (LDP)	Sadatoshi Kumagai (DPJ)	Kee Miki (Restoration)	Tomohiko Kinoshita (Innovation)	Hidetaka Inoue (Ishin)	Kenji Horii (Ishin)
#10	Masao Akamatsu (New Frontier)	Ikuko Ishii (JCP)	Masao Akamatsu (Kōmeitō)	Masao Akamatsu (Kōmeitō)	Sanae Takaichi (LDP)	Keiji Kokuta (JCP)	Tomoko Ukishima (Kōmeitō)	Shū Sakurai (CDP)	Keiji Kokuta (JCP)
#11	Makoto Mekata (LDP)	Yoshihide Sakagami (LDP)	Tomokatsu Kitagawa (LDP)	Koichiro Shimizu (LDP)	Hiroshi Hamamoto (DPJ)	Nobuhiko Isaka (Your Party)	Hiroshi Ando (LDP)	Yayoi Kimura (LDP)	Sachiko Horiba (Ishin)
#12	Miyoko Hida (Democratic)	Setsuya Kagita (DPJ)	Tenzo Okumura (DPJ)	Tatsui Kawabata (DPJ)	Nishi Hiroyoshi (Kōmeitō)	Tomoko Ukishima (Kōmeitō)	Hirofumi Yoshimura → Tamotsu Shiiki(Innovation)	Tomoko Ukishima (Kōmeitō)	Shigeki Kobayashi (LDP)
#13	Kiyomi Tsujimoto (SDP)	Akira Nishino (LDP)	Tetsuo Inami (DPJ)	Tomohiro Yamamoto (LDP)	Yoshihiko Watanabe (DPJ)	Hiroshi Miyake (Restoration)	Takeshi Miyamoto (JCP)	Shōhei Okashita (LDP)	Tomoko Ukishima (Kōmeitō)
#14	Hiroyoshi Nishi (New Frontier)	Satoru Ienishi (DPJ)	Takeshi Nishida (LDP)	Kiyomi Tsujimoto (SDP)	Naokazu Takemoto (LDP)	Taizō Mikazuki →Tatsuo Kawabata (DPJ)	Tatsuo Kawabata (DPJ)	Takashi Tanihata → Teruo Minobe(Ishin)	Hiroyuki Moriyama (CDP)
#15	Ikuko Ishii (JCP)	Yasuhide Yamana (Kōmeitō)	Nishi Hiroyoshi (Kōmeitō)	Ryuichi Doi (DPJ)	Mitsuei Kawakami →Vacant (DPJ)	Takashi Ōtsuka (LDP)	Tomu Tanigawa (LDP)	Kazunori Inoue (Kibō)	Ryota Endo (Ishin)
#16	Takashi Tanihata (LDP)	Hidekatsu Yoshii (JCP)	Keiji Kokuta (JCP)	Kyoko Izawa (LDP)	Hidekatsu Yoshii (JCP)	Sayuri Uenishi (Restoration)	Yasuto Urano (Innovation)	Fumiyoshi Murakami (CDP)	Hideyuki Tanaka (LDP)
#17	Takashi Yamamoto (New Frontier)	Susumu Shiota (Liberal)	Yoshikazu Tarui (DPJ)	Shigeki Sato (Kōmeitō)	Hirotaka Matsuoka (DPJ)	Fumiyoshi Murakami (Tomorrow)	Naoya Higuchi (Kōmeitō)	Tomu Tanigawa (LDP)	Yuichirō Ichitani (Ishin)
#18	Takuji Yanagimoto (LDP)	Okutani Toru →Tomokatsu Kitagawa (LDP)	Yasuhide Nakayama (LDP)	Keiji Kokuta (JCP)	Masatoshi Ishida (LDP)	Hiroshi Ando (LDP)	Shōhei Okashita (LDP)	Takeshi Miyamoto → Tadashi Shimizu(JCP)	Kōichi Munekiyo (LDP)
#19	Issei Inoue (Democratic)	Miyoko Hida (DPJ)	Kunihiko Muroi (DPJ)	Tsuyoshi Yamaguchi (DPJ)	Shigeki Sato (Kōmeitō)	Yuka Hayashibara (Restoration)	Sayuri Uenishi (Innovation)	Susumu Hamamura (Kōmeitō)	Kiyoshige Maekawa (Ishin)
#20	Sumi Fujita (JCP)	Renko Kitagawa (SDP)	Osamu Konishi (LDP)	Chubee Kagita →Yasuji Izumihara (LDP)	Juntaro Toyoda (DPJ)	Naoya Higuchi (Kōmeitō)	Tadashi Shimizu (JCP)	Yasushi Adachi (Ishin)	Yoko Wanibuchi (Kōmeitō)
#21	Shigeki Sato (New Frontier)	Tetsushi Kubo →Shigeki Sato (Kōmeitō)	Shigeki Sato (Kōmeitō)	Koichiro Ichimura (DPJ)	Kenta Matsunami (LDP)	Kiyomi Tsujimoto (DPJ)	Hirofumi Kado (LDP)	Hirofumi Kado (LDP)	Takeshi Miyamoto (JCP)
#22	Yoshihide Sakagami (LDP)	Yoko Fujiki (JCP)	Osamu Nakagawa (DPJ)	Kenshiro Matsunami (LDP)	Shunichi Higuchi (DPJ)	Shigeki Kobayashi (LDP)	Issei Tajima (DPJ)	Kanako Otsuji (CDP)	Hisashi Tokunaga (CDP)
#23	Osamu Yoshida (New Frontier)	Shonosuke Hayashi (LDP)	Takako Doi (SDP)	Makoto Taki (New Party)	Ryoichi Hattori （SDP）	Hiroki Iwanaga (Restoration)	Kenta Matsunami (Innovation)	Kazuhide Ōkuma (LDP)	Kōtarō Ikehada (Ishin)
#24	Kenzaburo Hara (LDP)	Kazuya Tamaki (DPJ)	Osamu Uno (LDP)	Nishi Hiroyoshi (Kōmeitō)	Bunmei Ibuki (LDP)	Takeshi Miyamoto (JCP)	Susumu Hamamura (Kōmeitō)	Yasuto Urano (Ishin)	Masahito Moriyama (LDP)
#25	Tsuji Daiichi (JCP)	Keisuke Sunada (LDP)	Ken Kishimoto (DPJ)	Yuji Fujii (LDP)	Yuzuru Takeuchi (Kōmeitō)	Hideto Shinbara (Restoration)	Kazuhide Ōkuma (LDP)	Kazunori Yamanoi （Kibō）	Masayuki Akagi (Ishin)
#26	Seiji Maehara (Democratic)	Tetsuji Nakamura (DPJ)	Hidekatsu Yoshii (JCP)	Osamu Fujimura (DPJ)	Takeshi Miyamoto (JCP)	Kenji Harada (LDP)	Nobuhisa Itō (Innovation)	Yoko Wanibuchi (Kōmeitō)	Alex Saitō (DPFP)
#27	Setsuya Kagita (New Frontier)	Masao Akamatsu (Kōmeitō)	Yasuhide Yamana (Kōmeitō)	Takashi Yano (LDP)	Koichi Tani (LDP)	Mitsunari Hatanaka (Your Party)	Masahito Moriyama (LDP)	Mamoru Shigemoto (LDP)	Tomu Tanigawa (LDP)
#28	Minoru Noda →Okutani Tōru (LDP)	Ikko Nakatsuka (Liberal)	Makoto Taki (LDP)	Okumura Tenzo (DPJ)	Masao Akamatsu (Kōmeitō)	Susumu Hamamura (Kōmeitō)	Terufumi Horiuchi (JCP)	Hideki Nagao (CDP)	Akiko Oishi (Reiwa)
#29	Tomoko Nakagawa (SDP)	Motoo Ohata (JCP)	Megumi Tsuji (DPJ)	Hidekatsu Yoshii (JCP)	Takashi Tanihata (LDP)	Mio Sugita (Innovation)	Hirofumi Hirano (DPJ)		
#30	Kyokudōzan Kazuyasu (New Frontier)	Yuki Ueda (SDP)							
#31	Yoko Fujiki (JCP)								
#32	Masaki Nakayama (LDP)								
#33	Tsutomu Yamamoto (Democratic)								

== Election results ==
=== 2026 ===
2026 results in the Kinki PR block
Party	Votes	Swing	%	Seats	+/–
Liberal Democratic Party (LDP)	2,842,876	30.41	▲9.69	10	▲4
Japan Innovation Party (Ishin)	2,168,635	23.20	▼0.14	8	▲1
Centrist Reform Alliance (CRA) (Note: Swings compared to CDP and Komeito)	1,332,752	14.26	▼11.42	5	▼2
Democratic Party For the People (DPFP)	651,785	6.97	▼1.37	2	0
Sanseitō	631,179	6.75	▲2.80	2	▲1
Team Mirai	553,496	5.92	New	0 (Note: Two of two seats forfeited due to lack of eligible candidates)	New
Japanese Communist Party (JCP)	480,188	5.14	▼2.18	1	▼1
Conservative Party of Japan (CPJ)	259,055	2.77	▼0.48	0	▼1
Reiwa Shinsengumi (Reiwa)	247,048	2.64	▼3.65	0	▼2
Tax Cuts Japan and Yukoku Alliance (Genyu)	105,647	1.13	New	0	New
Social Democratic Party (SDP)	75,014	0.80	▼0.32	0	0
Total	9,347,675	100.00		28	
Invalid votes	113,780	1.20			
Turnout	9,461,455	56.45	▲2.76		
Registered voters	16,761,917				

=== 2024 ===
2024 results in the Kinki PR block
Party	Votes	Swing	%	Seats	+/–
Japan Innovation Party (Ishin)	2,069,796	23.34	▼10.57	7	▼3
Liberal Democratic Party (LDP)	1,837,859	20.72	▼4.95	6	▼2
Constitutional Democratic Party of Japan (CDP)	1,247,328	14.06	▲2.43	4	▲1
Komeito	1,030,324	11.62	▼0.71	3	0
Democratic Party For the People (DPFP)	739,441	8.34	▲5.10	2	▲1
Japanese Communist Party (JCP)	649,195	7.32	▼0.53	2	0
Reiwa Shinsengumi (Reiwa)	557,899	6.29	▲3.17	2	▲1
Sanseitō	350,211	3.95	New	1	New
Conservative Party of Japan (CPJ)	288,326	3.25	New	1	New
Social Democratic Party (SDP)	99,161	1.12	▲0.04	0	0
Total	8,869,540	100.00		28	
Invalid votes	182,255	2.01			
Turnout	9,051,795	53.69	▼2.37		
Registered voters	16,858,894				

=== 2021 ===
2021 results in the Kinki PR block
Party	Votes	Swing	%	Seats	+/–
Japan Innovation Party (Ishin)	3,180,219	33.91	▲15.62	10	▲5
Liberal Democratic Party (LDP)	2,407,699	25.67	▼4.95	8	▼1
Komeito	1,155,683	12.32	▼1.47	3	▼1
Constitutional Democratic Party of Japan (CDP)	1,090,666	11.63	▼4.18	3	▼2
Japanese Communist Party (JCP)	736,156	7.85	▼1.46	2	0
Democratic Party For the People (DPFP)	303,480	3.24	New	1	New
Reiwa Shinsengumi (Reiwa)	292,483	3.12	New	1	New
NHK Party	111,539	1.19	New	0	New
Social Democratic Party (SDP)	100,980	1.08	▲0.14	0	0
Total	9,378,905	100.00		28	
Invalid votes	197,724	2.06			
Turnout	9,576,629	56.06	▲6.06		
Registered voters	17,081,677				

=== 2017 ===
2017 results in the Kinki PR block
Party	Votes	Swing	%	Seats	+/–
Liberal Democratic Party (LDP)	2,586,424	30.62	▲1.70	9	0
Japan Innovation Party (Ishin)	1,544,821	18.29	New	5	New
Constitutional Democratic Party of Japan (CDP)	1,335,360	15.81	New	5	New
Komeito	1,164,995	13.79	▼0.85	4	0
Kibō no Tō	913,860	10.82	New	3	New
Japanese Communist Party (JCP)	786,158	9.31	▼3.53	2	▼2
Social Democratic Party (SDP)	78,702	0.93	▼0.54	0	0
Happiness Realization Party (HRP)	36,774	0.44	▲0.01	0	0
Total	8,447,094	100.00		28	▼1
Invalid votes	150,474	1.75			
Turnout	8,597,568	50.00	▼1.32		
Registered voters	17,194,606				

=== 2014 ===
2014 results in the Kinki PR block
Party	Votes	Swing	%	Seats	+/–
Liberal Democratic Party (LDP)	2,442,006	28.91	▲5.06	9	▲2
Japan Innovation Party (JIP)	2,202,932	26.08	▼4.68	8	▼2
Komeito	1,236,217	14.64	▲1.98	4	0
Japanese Communist Party (JCP)	1,084,154	12.84	▲5.32	4	▲2
Democratic Party of Japan (DPJ)	1,047,361	12.40	▲0.37	4	▲1
Party for Future Generations	175,279	2.08	New	0	New
Social Democratic Party (SDP)	124,494	1.47	▲0.11	0	0
People's Life Party (PLP)	97,398	1.15	New	0	New
Happiness Realization Party (HRP)	35,830	0.42	▲0.08	0	0
Total	8,445,671	100.00		29	
Invalid votes	192,636	2.23			
Turnout	8,638,307	51.32	▼7.79		
Registered voters	16,832,477				

=== 2012 ===
2012 results in the Kinki PR block
Party	Votes	Swing	%	Seats	+/–
Japan Restoration Party (JRP)	2,999,020	30.76	New	10	New
Liberal Democratic Party (LDP)	2,326,005	23.86	▲0.63	7	▼2
Komeito	1,234,345	12.66	▼0.32	4	▼1
Democratic Party of Japan (DPJ)	1,173,051	12.03	▼30.38	3	▼8
Japanese Communist Party (JCP)	732,976	7.52	▼2.05	2	▼1
Your Party	635,381	6.52	▲2.35	2	▲2
Tomorrow Party of Japan (TPJ)	481,603	4.94	New	1	New
Social Democratic Party (SDP)	133,064	1.36	▼2.32	0	▼1
Happiness Realization Party (HRP)	33,509	0.34	▼0.38	0	0
Total	9,748,954	100.00		29	
Invalid votes	203,761	2.05			
Turnout	9,952,715	59.11	▼7.79		
Registered voters	16,837,834				

=== 2009 ===
2009 results in the Kinki PR block
Party	Votes	Swing	%	Seats	+/–
Democratic Party of Japan (DPJ)	4,733,415	42.41	▲13.39	11	▲2
Liberal Democratic Party (LDP)	2,592,451	23.23	▼13.57	9	▼2
Komeito	1,449,170	12.98	▼1.97	5	▲1
Japanese Communist Party (JCP)	1,067,443	9.56	▼0.10	3	0
Your Party	465,591	4.17	New	0	New
Social Democratic Party (SDP)	411,092	3.68	▼2.01	1	0
People's New Party (PNP)	169,380	1.52	New	0	New
New Party Nippon (Nippon)	133,708	1.20	▼2.67	0	▼1
Happiness Realization Party (HRP)	80,529	0.72	New	0	New
New Renaissance Party (NRP)	58,141	0.52	New	0	New
Total	11,160,920	100.00		29	
Invalid votes	250,392	2.19			
Turnout	11,411,312	67.82	▲1.21		
Registered voters	16,826,523				

=== 2005 ===
2005 results in the Kinki PR block
Party	Votes	Swing	%	Seats	+/–
Liberal Democratic Party (LDP)	4,003,209	36.79	▲6.10	11	▲2
Democratic Party of Japan (DPJ)	3,157,556	29.02	▼8.09	9	▼2
Komeito	1,626,678	14.95	▼2.43	4	▼1
Japanese Communist Party (JCP)	1,051,949	9.67	▼1.08	3	0
Social Democratic Party (SDP)	619,883	5.70	▲1.63	1	0
New Party Nippon (Nippon)	420,908	3.87	New	1	New
Total	10,880,183	100.00		29	
Invalid votes	260,874	2.34			
Turnout	11,141,057	66.61	▲9.19		
Registered voters	16,726,546				

=== 2003 ===
2003 results in the Kinki PR block
Party	Votes	Swing	%	Seats	+/–
Democratic Party of Japan (DPJ)	3,425,342	37.11	▲13.77	11	▲4
Liberal Democratic Party (LDP)	2,833,181	30.69	▲7.02	9	▲2
Komeito	1,604,469	17.38	▲1.31	5	0
Japanese Communist Party (JCP)	992,142	10.75	▼5.06	3	▼2
Social Democratic Party (SDP)	375,228	3.07	▼5.07	1	▼2
Total	9,230,362	100.00		29	▼1
Invalid votes	322,371	3.37			
Turnout	9,552,733	57.42	▼1.63		
Registered voters	16,636,274				

=== 2000 ===
2000 results in the Kinki PR block
Party	Votes	Swing	%	Seats	+/–
Liberal Democratic Party (LDP)	2,185,236	23.68	▼4.69	7	▼3
Democratic Party of Japan (DPJ)	2,154,312	23.34	▲9.45	7	▲2
Komeito	1,483,220	16.07	New	5	New
Japanese Communist Party (JCP)	1,458,970	15.81	▼1.56	5	▼1
Liberal Party (LP)	878,910	9.52	New	3	New
Social Democratic Party (SDP)	843,060	9.13	▲2.98	3	▲1
New Conservative Party (NCP)	125,824	1.36	New	0	New
Liberal League (LL)	99,791	1.08	▲0.42	0	0
Total	9,229,323	100.00		30	▼3
Invalid votes	466,930	4.82			
Turnout	9,696,253	59.05			
Registered voters	16,419,889				

=== 1996 ===
1996 results in the Kinki PR block
Party	Votes	%	Seats
New Frontier Party (NFP)	2,567,452	29.16	10
Liberal Democratic Party (LDP)	2,497,411	28.37	10
Japanese Communist Party (JCP)	1,539,172	17.48	6
Democratic Party (DP)	1,223,192	13.89	5
Social Democratic Party (SDP)	542,047	6.16	2
New Party Sakigake (NPS)	234,849	2.67	0
New Socialist Party (NSP)	122,989	1.40	0
Liberal League (LL)	58,320	0.66	0
Democratic Reform Party	18,844	0.21	0
Total	8,804,276	100.00	33
