= Next Japanese general election =

- On or before 8 February 2030

All 465 seats in the House of Representatives 233 seats needed for a majority
- Opinion polls
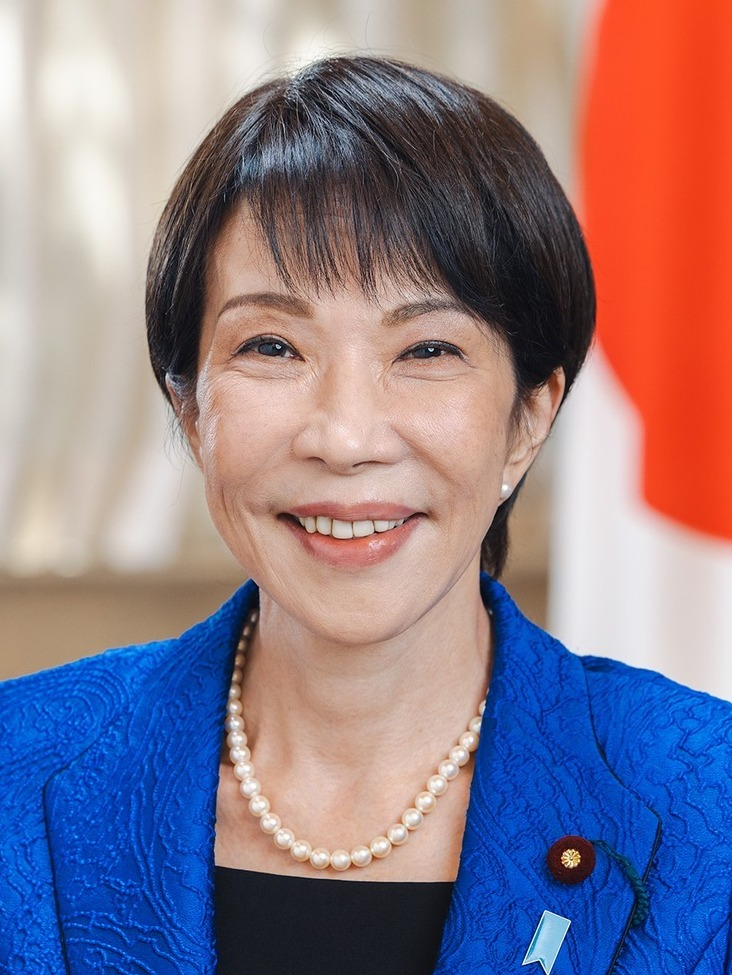

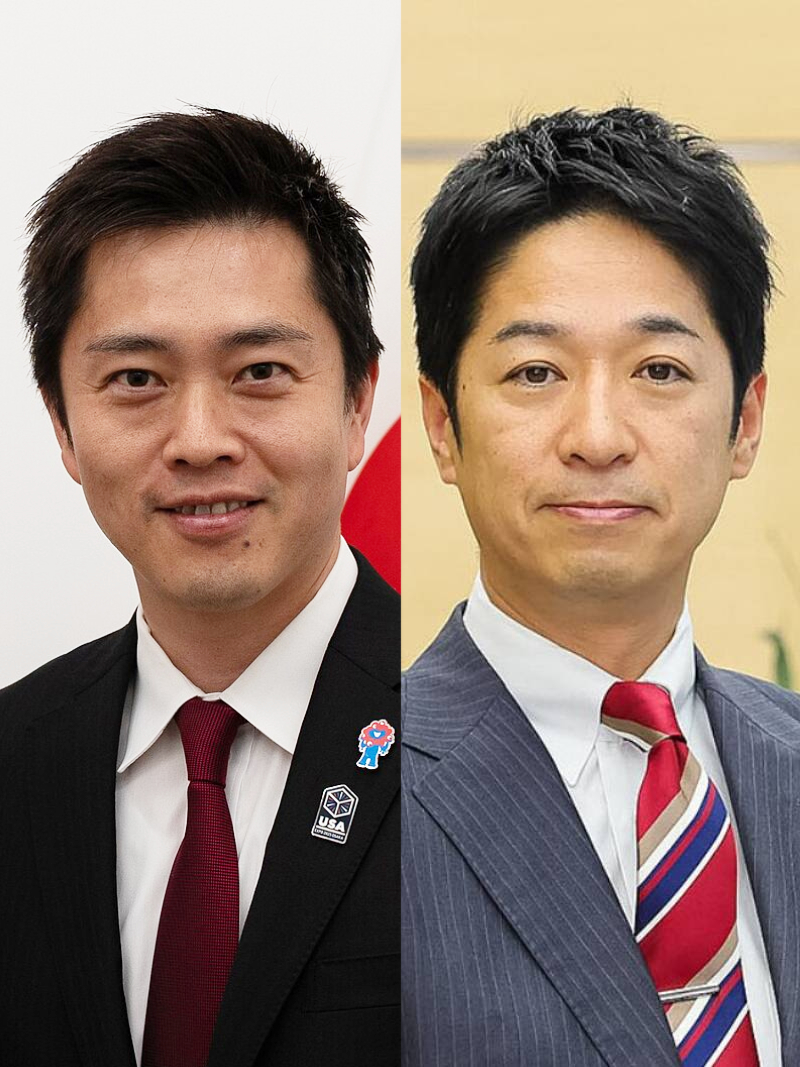

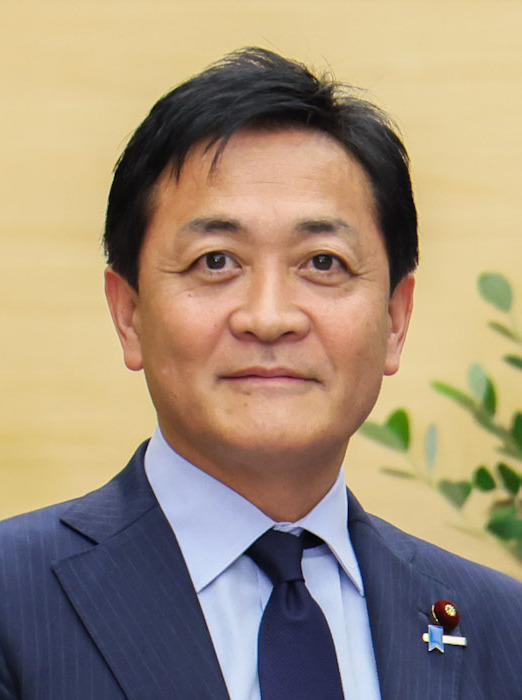

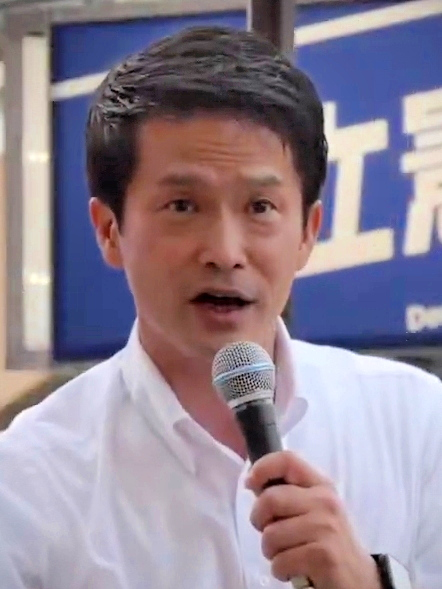

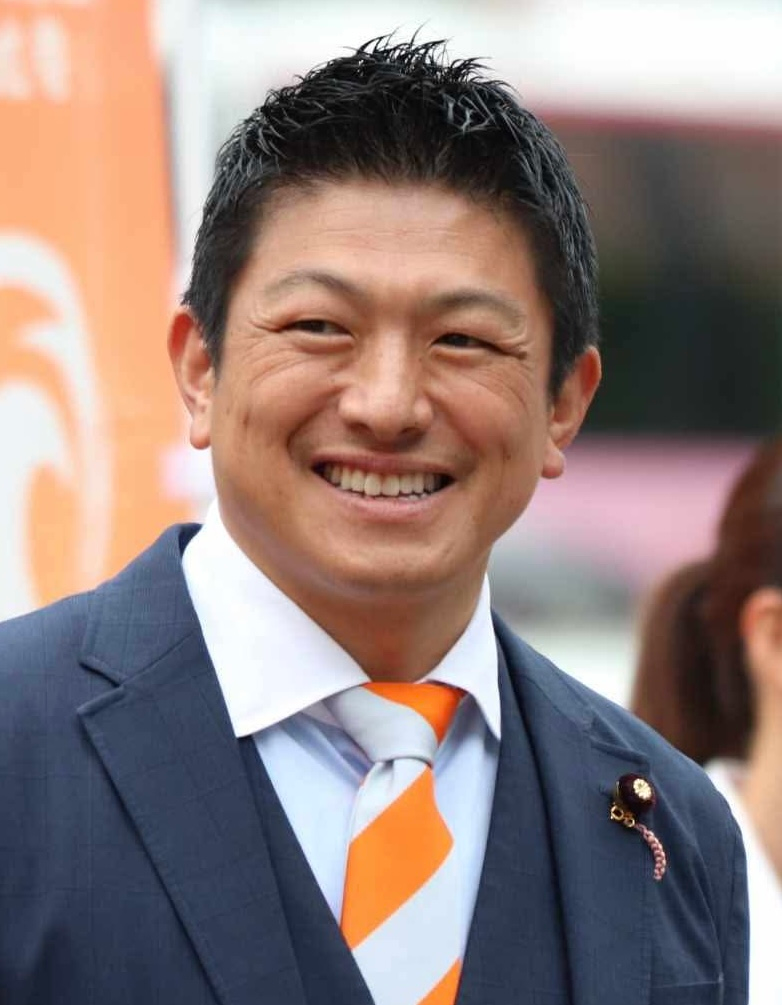

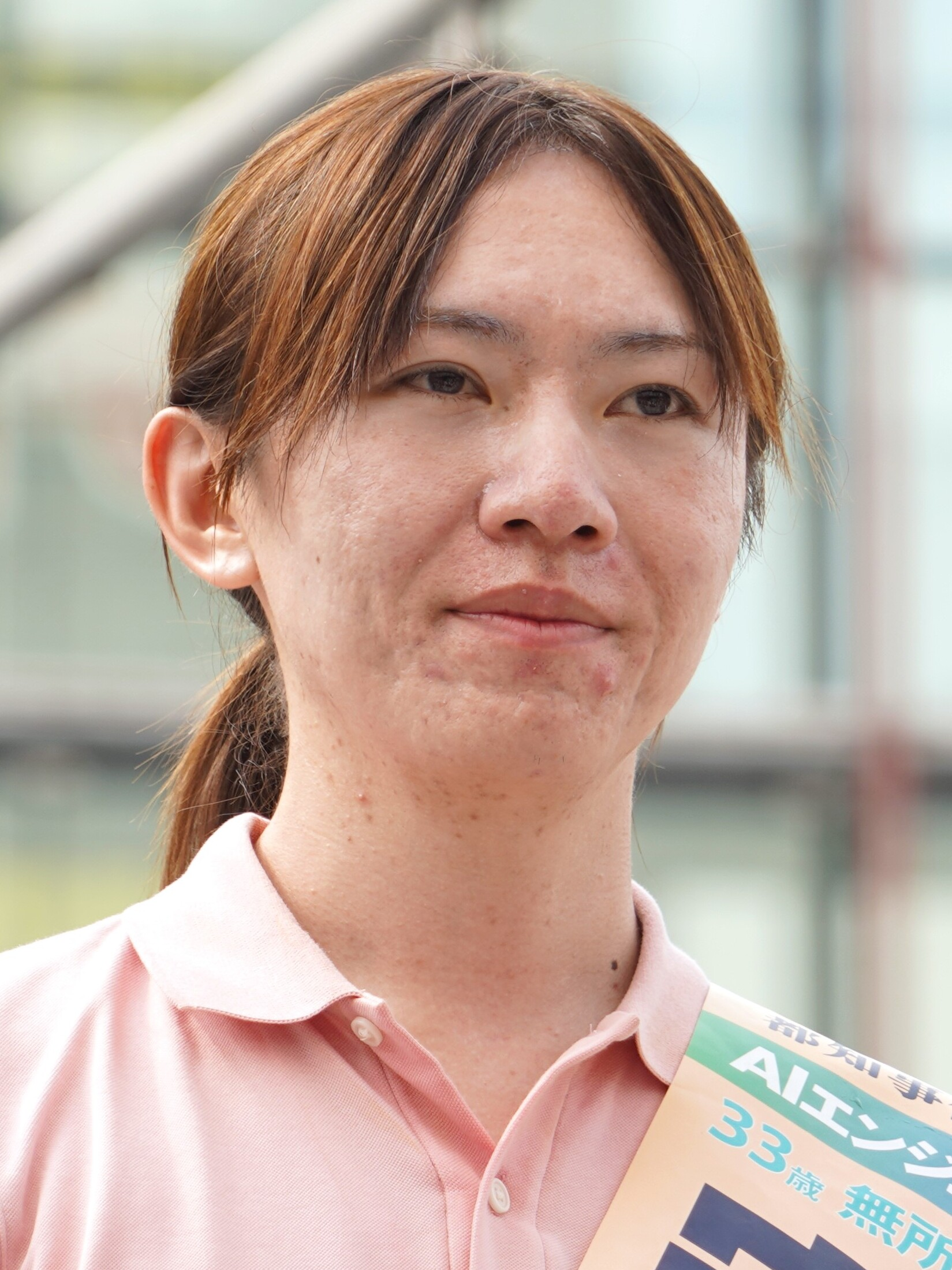

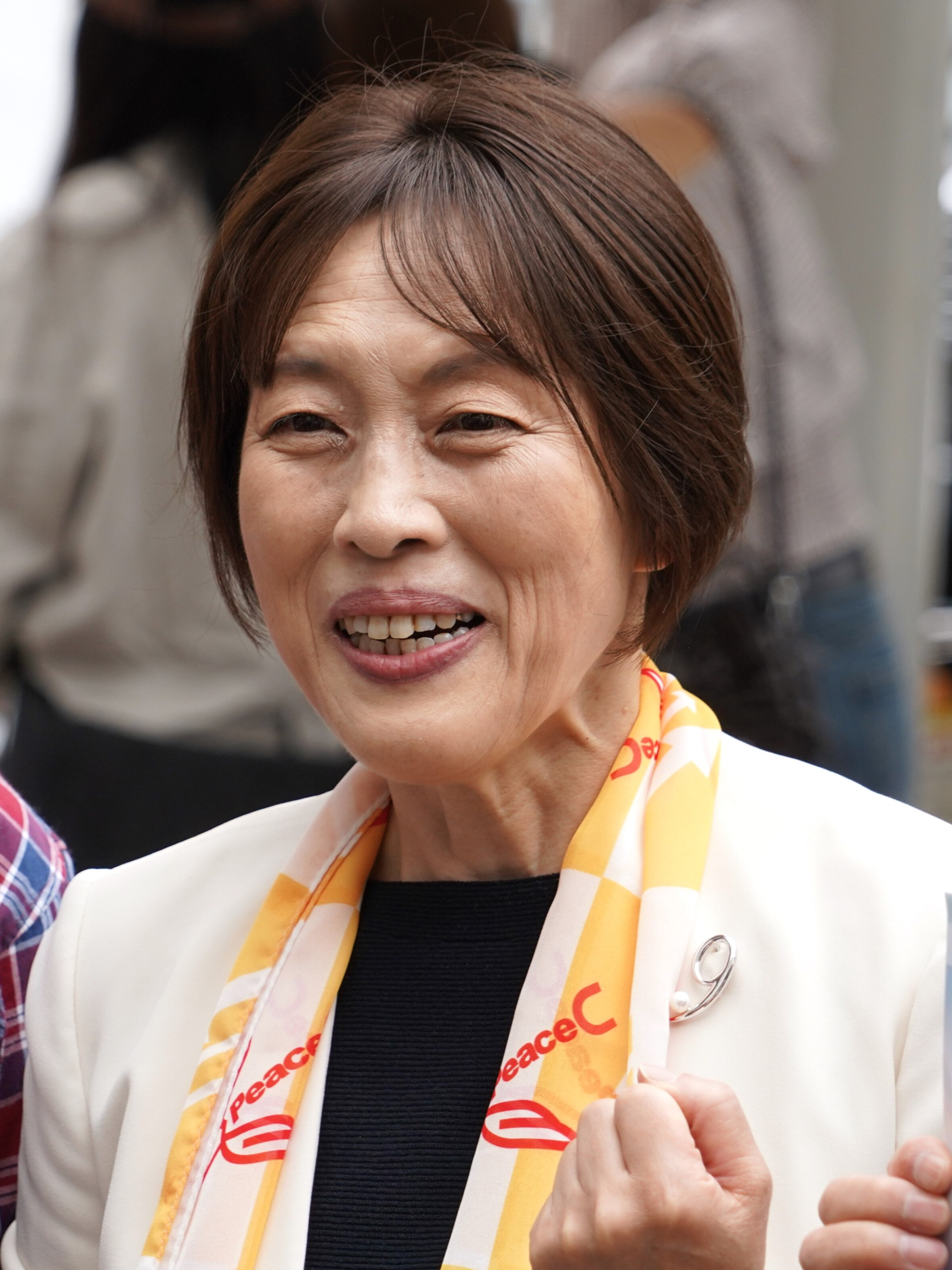

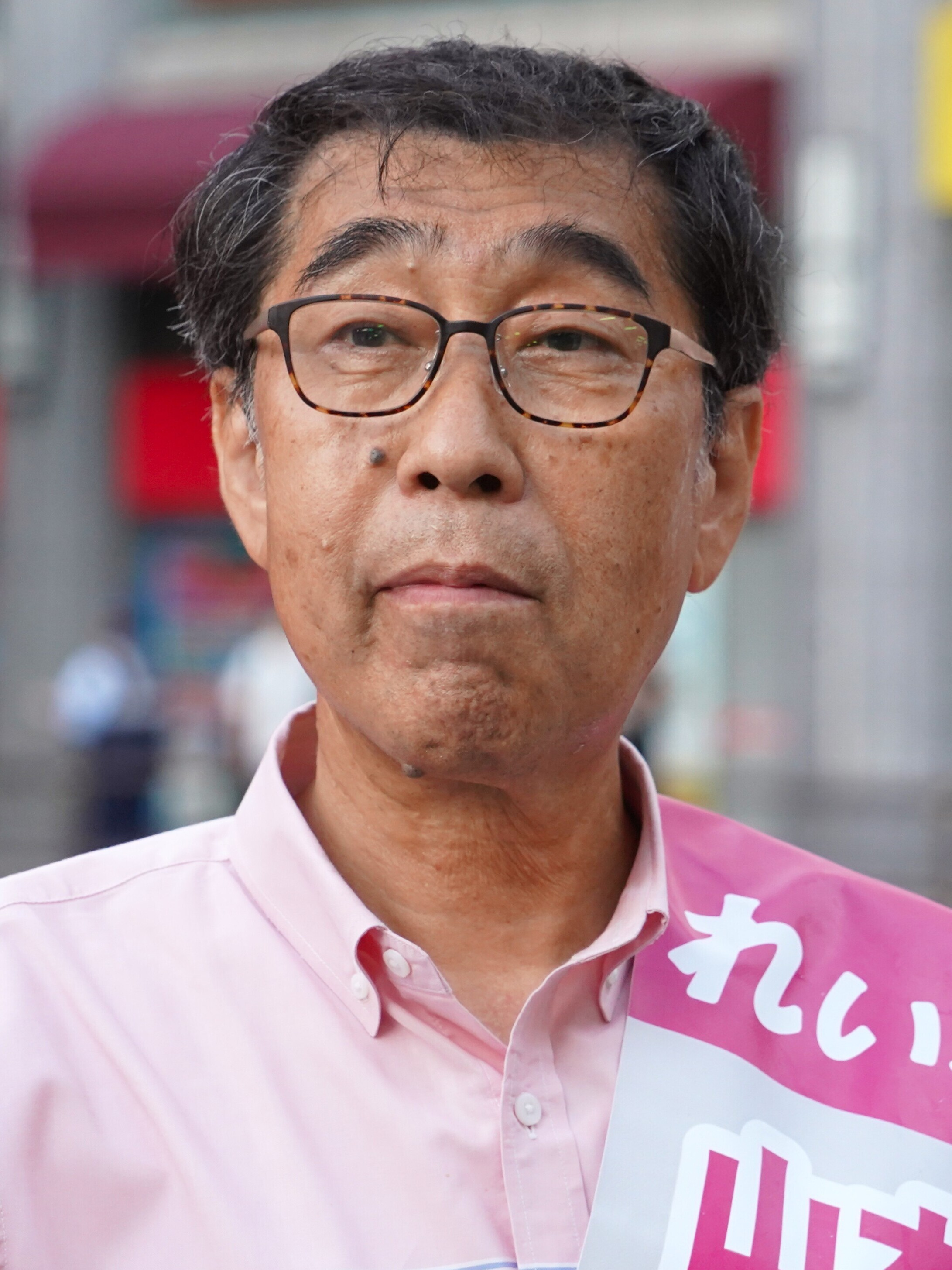
Leader	Sanae Takaichi	Hirofumi Yoshimura; Fumitake Fujita	Yuichiro Tamaki
Party	LDP	Ishin	DPP
Leader since	4 October 2025	1 December 2024; 8 August 2025	7 May 2018
Leader's seat	Nara 2nd	None (Note: Yoshimura serves as the governor of Osaka Prefecture); Osaka 12th	Kagawa 2nd
Last election	316 seats	36 seats	28 seats
Leader	Mitsunari Okamoto	Junya Ogawa	Sohei Kamiya
Party	Komeito	Democratic Reform	Sanseitō
Leader since	1 October 2026	17 September 2026	17 March 2020
Leader's seat	Tokyo PR	Kagawa 1st	None (Note: Sits in the Senate for the national PR block)
Last election	N/A	N/A	15 seats
Leader	Takahiro Anno	Tomoko Tamura	Joji Yamamoto
Party	Team Mirai	JCP	Life
Leader since	8 May 2025	18 January 2024	31 July 2026
Leader's seat	None	Tokyo PR	Southern Kanto PR
Last election	11 seats	4 seats	1 seat
Incumbent Prime Minister
Sanae Takaichi
LDP

General elections are scheduled to be held in Japan no later than 8 February 2030 to elect all 465 seats of the House of Representatives, the lower house of the National Diet. Voting will take place in all constituencies, including 289 single-seat electoral districts and 11 proportional blocks (176 seats). An election may occur before the scheduled date if the Prime Minister of Japan dissolves Parliament for a snap election or if the House of Representatives passes a motion of no confidence in the government.

== Background ==
=== Premiership of Sanae Takaichi ===
The 2026 general election resulted in a landslide victory for the ruling Liberal Democratic Party (LDP). The LDP regained its majority, which it had lost in 2024, securing the largest seat count in the party's 71-year history and a two-third supermajority in the lower house. The Liberal Democratic Party–Japan Innovation Party coalition (LDP–JIP) further held three-quarters of the total seats in the House of Representatives.

== Electoral system ==
The 465 seats of the House of Representatives are contested via parallel voting. Of these, 289 members are elected in single-member constituencies using first-past-the-post voting, while 176 members are elected in 11 multi-member constituencies via party list proportional representation. Candidates from parties with legal political party-list, which requires either ≥5 Diet members or ≥1 Diet member and ≥2% of the nationwide vote in one tier of a recent national election, are allowed to stand in a constituency and be present on the party list. If they lose their constituency vote, they may still be elected in the proportionally allocated seats; however, if such a dual candidate wins less than 10% of the vote in their majoritarian constituency, they are also disqualified as a proportional candidate.

== Political parties ==
Parties		Leader(s)	Ideology	Seats		Status
Parties		Leader(s)	Ideology	Last election	Current composition	Status
Liberal Democratic Party		Sanae Takaichi	Japanese nationalism	316 / 465	315 / 465	Governing coalition
Japan Innovation Party		Hirofumi Yoshimura; Fumitake Fujita	Libertarian conservatism	36 / 465	36 / 465	Governing coalition
Centrist Reform; Alliance	Komeito	Mitsunari Okamoto	Buddhist democracy	49 / 465	28 / 465	Opposition
Centrist Reform; Alliance	Democratic Reform Party	Junya Ogawa	Social liberalism	49 / 465	18 / 465	Opposition
Centrist Reform; Alliance	Centrist Reform Alliance	Sō Watanabe	Centrism	49 / 465	1 / 465	Opposition
Democratic Party For the People		Yuichiro Tamaki	Moderate conservatism	28 / 465	28 / 465	Opposition
Sanseitō		Sohei Kamiya	Right-wing populism	15 / 465	15 / 465	Opposition
Team Mirai		Takahiro Anno	E-Democracy	11 / 465	11 / 465	Opposition
Japanese Communist Party		Tomoko Tamura	Communism	4 / 465	4 / 465	Opposition
Party of Life		Joji Yamamoto	Left-wing populism	1 / 465	1 / 465	Opposition
Tax Cuts Japan and Yukoku Alliance		Kazuhiro Haraguchi; Takashi Kawamura	Conspiracism	1 / 465	1 / 465	Opposition
Independents and others		—N/a	—N/a	4 / 465	6 / 465	Mixed

== Opinion polling ==
LOESS curve of the party identification polling for the next Japanese general election with a 7-day average
