= 2019 Osaka 12th district by-election =

Local election in Japan

- 21 April 2019

Osaka 12th district
- Turnout: 47.00%
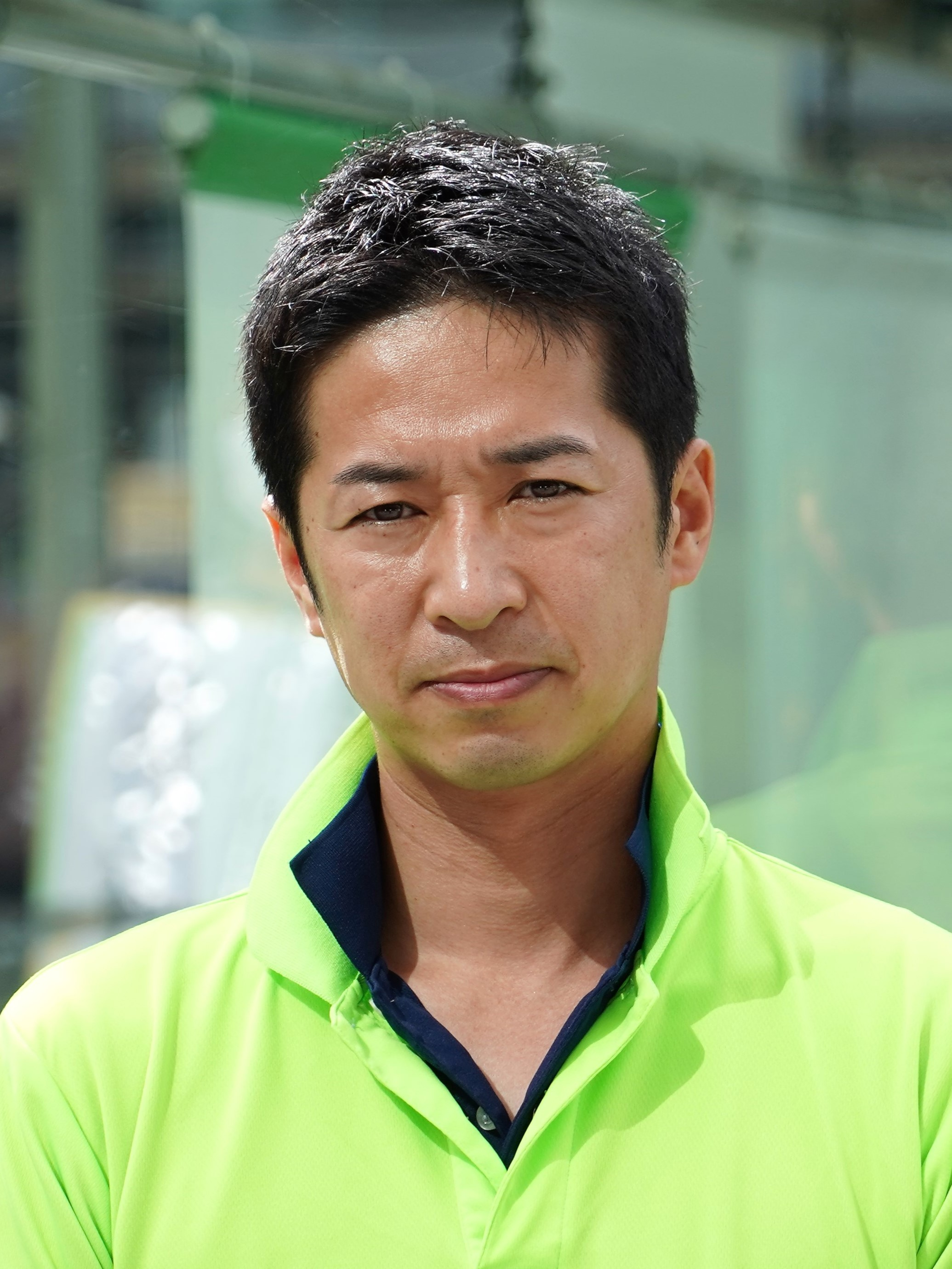

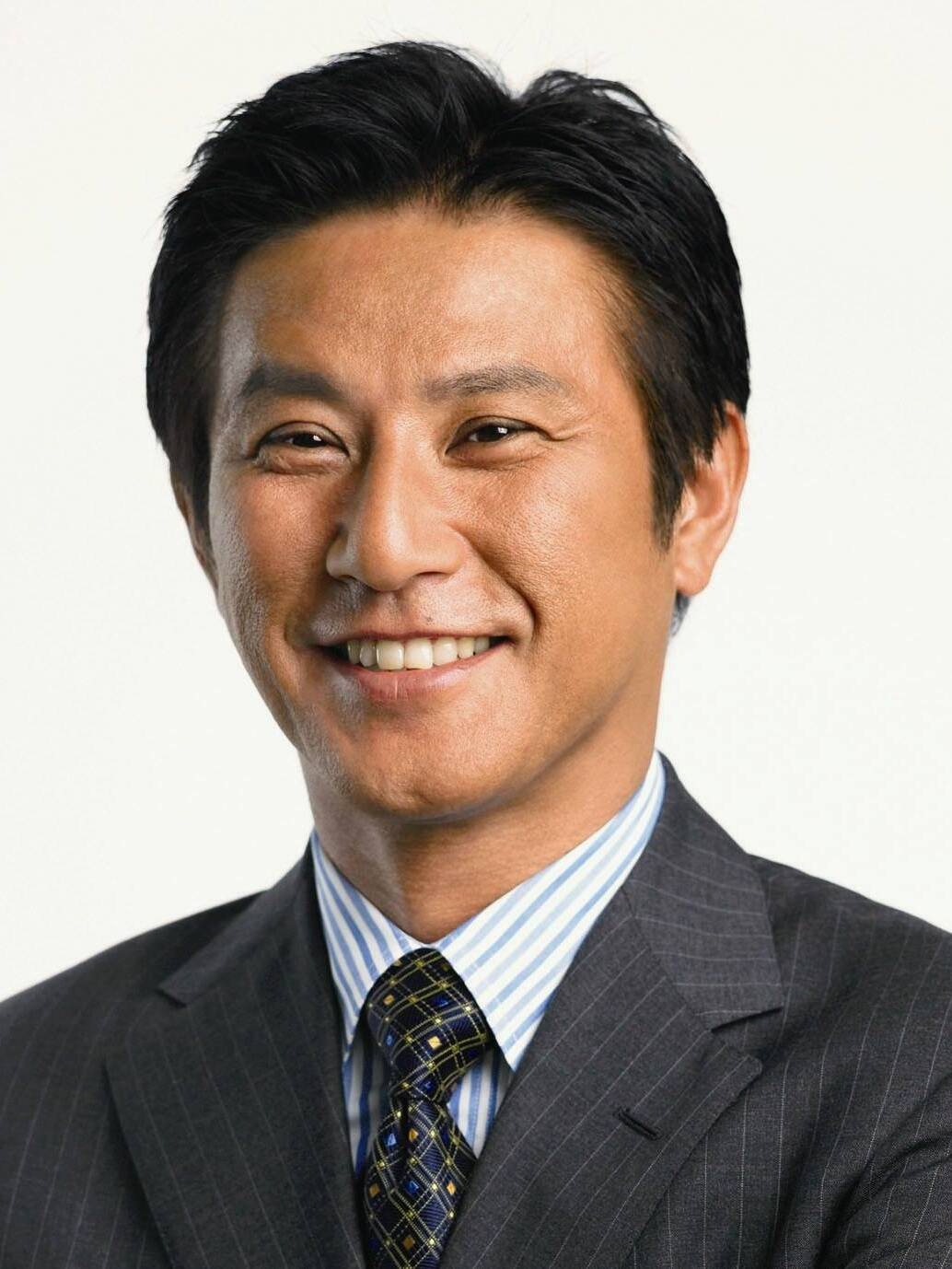
Nominee	Fumitake Fujita	Shinpei Kitagawa	Shinji Tarutoko
Party	Ishin	LDP	Independent
Popular vote	60,341	47,025	35,358
Percentage	38.49%	30.00%	22.56%
Representative before election
Tomokatsu Kitagawa
LDP
Elected Representative
Fumitake Fujita
Ishin

A by-election for the Osaka 12th district in the Japanese House of Representatives was held on 21 April 2019. The by-election was called following the death of the incumbent member Tomokatsu Kitagawa, a member of the Liberal Democratic Party (LDP), from peritonitis on 26 December 2018. Kitagawa had served the district almost continuously since 2005 (except between 2009–12) and defended the seat by a narrow 4.4% margin in the 2017 election, making the seat a potential battleground. The by-election was held on the same day with the second round of the unified local elections and another House by-election for the Okinawa 3rd district.

The by-election was won by Nippon Ishin no Kai's Fujita Fumitake, marking a gain for the party.

== Candidates ==
- Shinji Tarutoko (Independent), former Minister for Internal Affairs and Communications and representative for the district.
- Shinpei Kitagawa (LDP), event organiser and nephew of Tomokatsu Kitagawa.
- Fumitake Fujita (Ishin), company president.
- Takeshi Miyamoto (Independent - JCP), former member of the House of Representatives.

== Results ==
House of Representatives: Osaka 12th district by-election, 2019
Party	Candidate	Votes	%	±%
Ishin	Fujita Fumitake	60,341	38.5	
LDP	Shinpei Kitagawa	47,025	30.0	
Independent	Shinji Tarutoko	35,358	22.6	
JCP	Takeshi Miyamoto	14,027	8.9	
Total votes		156,751		
Turnout			47.00	−0.50
Ishin gain from LDP		Swing		
