= Zentarō =

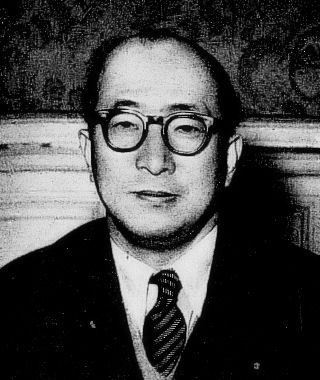
- Zentaro Kosaka (1912–2000), Japanese politician
- Pronunciation: dzeNtaɾoɯ (IPA)
- Gender: Male

Origin
- Origin: Japanese
- Meaning: Different meanings depending on the kanji used

Other names
- Alternative spelling: Zentaro (Kunrei-shiki) Zentaro (Nihon-shiki) Zentarō, Zentaro, Zentarou (Hepburn)

Zentarō, Zentaro or Zentarou is a masculine Japanese given name.

== Written forms ==
Zentarō can be written using different combinations of kanji characters. Here are some examples:

The characters used for "taro" (太郎) literally means "thick (big) son" and usually used as a suffix to a masculine name, especially for the first son. The "zen" part of the name can use a variety of characters, each of which will change the meaning of the name ("善" for virtuous, "全" for all, "前" and so on).

- 善太郎, "virtuous, big son"
- 全太郎, "all, big son"
- 然太郎, "so, big son"
- 前太郎, "in front, big son"

Other combinations...

- 善太朗, "virtuous, thick, bright"
- 善多朗, "virtuous, many, bright"
- 善汰朗, "virtuous, excessive, bright"
- 全太朗, "all, thick, bright"
- 然太朗, "so, thick, bright"

The name can also be written in hiragana ぜんたろう or katakana ゼンタロウ.

== Notable people with the name ==
- Zentaro Kamei (亀井 善太郎; born 1971), Japanese politician
- Zentaro Kosaka (小坂 善太郎; 1912–2000), Japanese politician
- Zentaro Watanabe (渡辺 善太郎; 1963–2021), Japanese musician
