= Fumitake Fujita =

Japanese businessman and politician

- 藤田 文武
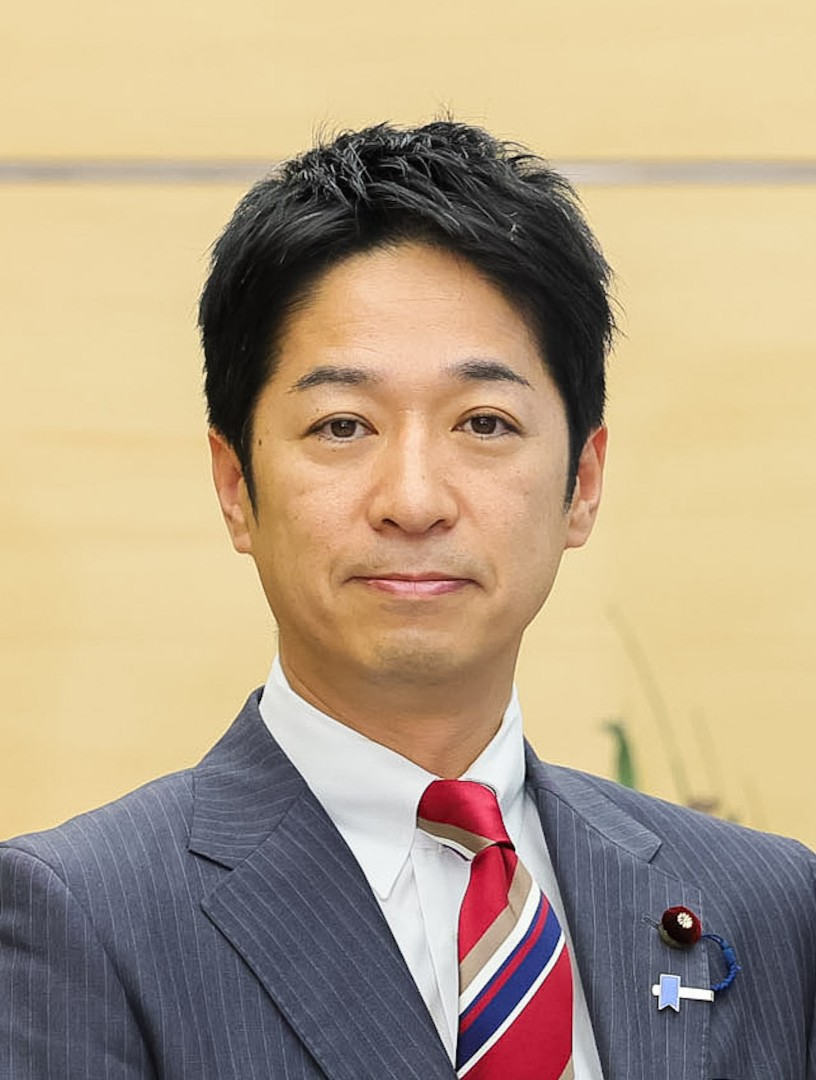
- Fujita in 2025

Co-Leader of Nippon Ishin no Kai
- Incumbent
- Assumed office 8 August 2025
- Leader: Hirofumi Yoshimura
- Preceded by: Seiji Maehara

Secretary-General of the Nippon Ishin no Kai
- In office 30 November 2021 – 1 December 2024
- Leader: Ichirō Matsui; Nobuyuki Baba
- Preceded by: Nobuyuki Baba
- Succeeded by: Ryohei Iwatani

Member of the House of Representatives
- Incumbent
- Assumed office 22 April 2019
- Preceded by: Tomokatsu Kitagawa
- Constituency: Osaka 12th

Personal details
- Born: 27 December 1980 (age 45) Neyagawa, Osaka, Japan
- Party: Ishin (National); Osaka Restoration Association (Local)
- Education: University of Tsukuba

Fumitake Fujita (藤田 文武, Fujita Fumitake; born 27 December 1980) is a Japanese businessman and politician. A member of Nippon Ishin no Kai (Japan Innovation Party), he has served as a member of the House of Representatives since 2019 and co-leader of Ishin since August 2025, serving alongside Osaka Governor Hirofumi Yoshimura. He previously served as the party’s Secretary-General from 2021 to 2024.

== Early life ==
He was born in Neyagawa in Osaka Prefecture. He graduated from Osaka Shijonawate High School, and then chose to attend the University of Tsukuba, majoring in sports industries. He was also a member of the Rugby teams in both High School and University.

After graduating from University, he served as a P.E instructor at Shijonawate, his former High School, as well as Makino and Daito High Schools, all three of which were in Osaka. He also coached the Rugby team at Shijonawate. In 2005, he briefly left Japan to study sports management in New Zealand and Australia, before returning to Japan and working at a venture company. He then established KTAJ Co., LTD, a sports management business, and became its representative director.

== Political career ==
In 2012, he entered the first term of the Ishin Political School. In 2017, he then decided to run in that year's general election for Osaka-12th as the Ishin candidate, facing off against LDP member Tomokatsu Kitagawa and JCP member Masanori Matsuo. He ultimately lost by five points, and was unable to secure a proportional block seat. When Kitagawa died in 2018, he announced his candidacy in the by-election which occurred after. He ran against Tomokatsu's nephew, Shinpei Kitagawa, and former Opposition member Shinji Tarutoko on top of JCP member Takeshi Miyamoto. He won by nearly 8%, marking a gain for the party.

In the 2021 Japanese general election, he won by nearly 20 points over Shinpei Kitagawa again. Once Toranosuke Katayama resigned as co-leader of the party and Nobuyuki Baba was appointed in his stead, the party chose to appoint Fujita as his replacement for Secretary-General. In the 2022 Ishin leadership election, he supported Baba.

He has been one of the foremost spokespersons in Nippon Ishin no Kai. He has also been extremely critical of the ruling LDP, stating that under no circumstances would Ishin form a coalition with the party, further saying that he would have to "see the election results before commenting on a coalition (with the CDP)."

After Ishin underperformed in the 2025 House of Councilors election, co-leader Seiji Maehara and three other party executives announced their intention to resign. Fujita was elected to replace Maehara on 8 August 2025, serving as the party's chief representative in the National Diet while Osaka Governor Hirofumi Yoshimura maintains his leadership position.

== Political positions ==
Fujita supports amending Article 9 of the Constitution of Japan, which renounces the nation's right to war. He believes it should be amended to clearly state the existence of the Self-Defense Forces. Additionally, Fujita is in favor of creating an emergency clause in the Constitution.

Believing nuclear energy is necessary for the time being, Fujita thinks it should be phased out over time and in the future.

While supportive of the introduction of a system of optional separate surnames for married couples, Fujita opposes the legalization of same-sex marriage and the concept of a female Emperor.

== Personal life ==
His family consists of his two sons and a wife. Fujita saw the company he was working at in 2008 briefly enter financial shock due to the Great Recession, and after starting his own business, ran multiple gyms, acupuncture clinics, and nurse care facilities.

== Electoral history ==
House of Representatives: Osaka 12th district by-election, 2019
Party	Candidate	Votes	%	±%
Ishin	Fujita Fumitake	60,341	38.5	
LDP	Shinpei Kitagawa	47,025	30.0	
Independent	Shinji Tarutoko	35,358	22.6	
JCP	Takeshi Miyamoto	14,027	8.9	
Total votes		156,751		
Turnout			47.00	−0.50
Ishin gain from LDP		Swing		

2021
Party	Candidate	Votes	%	±%
Ishin	Fumitake Fujita	94,003	51.2	▲12.7
LDP	Shinpei Kitagawa	59,304	32.3	▲2.3
CDP	Yūko Utsunomiya	17,730	9.7	
JCP	Masanori Matsuo	12,614	6.9	
Turnout			55.0	▲8.0

2024
Party	Candidate	Votes	%	±%
Ishin	Fumitake Fujita	86,380	52.35	▲1.15
LDP	Shinpei Kitagawa	55,658	33.73	▲1.44
JCP	Tooru Ohta	22,970	13.92	▲7.05
Turnout		165,008	51.10	▼3.90

House of Representatives (Japan)
Preceded by Tomokatsu Kitagawa	Representative for Osaka 12th 2019–present	Incumbent
Party political offices
Preceded by Nobuyuki Baba	Secretary-General of Ishin no Kai; 2021-2024	Succeeded by Ryohei Iwatani
Preceded by Seiji Maehara	Head of the Diet Members Group, Nippon Ishin no Kai; 2025–present	Incumbent
Preceded by Seiji Maehara	Co-leader of Ishin no Kai; 2025-present	Incumbent
