= Opinion polling for the next Japanese general election =

In the run up to the next Japanese general election, various organisations are carrying out opinion polling to gauge voting intention. Results of such polls are displayed in this article. The date range for these opinion polls is from the 2026 Japanese general election, held on 8 February, to the present day.

== Pollsters ==
The following table shows the pollsters who conduct opinion polls in Japan.

Pollster	Method	Database
ANN	RDD	https://www.tv-asahi.co.jp/hst/poll/
Asahi	RDD	https://www.asahi.com/yoron/database/
Jiji Press	Personal interview	https://www.jiji.com/jc/v7?id=2025jijiyoron
JNN	RDD	https://newsdig.tbs.co.jp/list/search?fulltext=JNN世論調査
Kyodo News (Note: Database from Chunichi Shimbun.)	RDD	https://www.chunichi.co.jp/digican/shuin2024_yoron
Mainichi	D-survey (Note: Online (smartphone based))	https://mainichi.jp/opinion-poll/
SSRC	D-survey	https://ssrc.jp/research/
NHK	RDD	https://www.nhk.or.jp/senkyo/shijiritsu/
Nikkei	RDD	https://vdata.nikkei.com/newsgraphics/cabinet-approval-rating/
TV Tokyo	RDD	https://txbiz.tv-tokyo.co.jp/search/detail?search_word=テレ東･日経世論調査
Sankei	RDD	https://www.sankei.com/politics/poll/
FNN	RDD	https://www.fnn.jp/subcategory/opinion_poll
Senkyo.com	RDD/Online (Note: Not included in this article.)	https://go2senkyo.com/research/
Yomiuri	RDD	https://www.yomiuri.co.jp/election/yoron-chosa/
NNN	RDD	https://www.ntv.co.jp/yoron/

== Party identification ==

=== 2026 ===
Fieldwork date	Polling firm	Sample size	LDP	Ishin	DPFP	Sansei	Mirai	DRP	JCP	Life	CDP	Komei	CPJ	SDP	Others	No party	Und./ no ans.	Lead
13–16 Nov	Jiji Press	1,142	21.9	2	3.2	1.9	1	0.1	1.6	0.2	2.3	3.1	0.4	0.3	0.3 (Note: CRA: 0.3%)	59.2	2.5	37.3
14–15 Nov	ANN	1,012	38.4	2.7	5.2	6.6	2.3	0.2	3.4	0.4	3.7	2.3	0.9	0.3	1.6 (Note: CRA: 0.2%; others: 1.4%)	27.6	4.4	10.8
14–15 Nov	Asahi	959	32	2	5	3	1	0	2	1	2	2	1	0	1 (Note: CRA: 1%)	41	7	9
14–15 Nov	Kyodo News	1,049	34.9	3.8	6.6	5.4	6.3	0.5	5.8	0.3	3.6	1.6	1.2	0.7	0.8 (Note: CRA: 0.5%; others: 0.3%)	25.2	3.3	9.7
14–15 Nov	Sankei/FNN	1,015	33.5	3.3	4	4.8	1.5	0.1	1.6	0.8	2.1	2.5	0.3	0.1	0.6 (Note: Centrist Reform Alliance: 0.4%; others: 0.2%)	39.6	5.2	6.1
13–15 Nov	Yomiuri/NNN	1,033	32	2	4	4	1	0	3	0	1	3	2	0	–	43	4	11
6–8 Nov	NHK	1,195	35.9	2.4	3.4	3	0.9	0.4	2.8	0.6	3.5	1.3	1	0.3	0.8 (Note: CRA: 0.5%; others: 0.3%)	37.1	6.6	1.2
31 Oct – 1 Nov	JNN	1,024	32.9	3.7	3.2	3.6	1.4	0.7	2	0.5	2.1	2.1	1	0.4	0.7	42.7	3	9.8
24–25 Oct	Mainichi/SSRC	2,001	23	5	5	3	4	1	2	0	4	2	2	0	0	47	–	24
23–25 Oct	Nikkei/TV Tokyo	945	39	3	7	4	3	0	3	0	5	1	2	0	–	28	5	11
17–18 Oct	ANN	1,018	36.8	3.7	4.9	4.2	1.6	0.3	3.4	1.2	5.1	1.8	1.3	0.6	1.6 (Note: CRA: 0.4%; others: 1.2%)	27.9	5.6	8.9
17–18 Oct	Asahi	1,108	32	4	4	2	1	0	3	0	2	3	1	0	1 (Note: CRA: 1%)	41	6	9
17–18 Oct	Kyodo News	1,050	32.1	6.7	8.4	6.1	5.2	0.9	2.9	0.3	4.2	4.6	1.8	0.2	1.3 (Note: CRA: 1.1%; others: 0.2%)	23.3	2	8.8
17–18 Oct	Sankei/FNN	1,014	34.5	2	3.5	4.2	1.2	0.1	2	0.5	2.7	2.8	0.6	0.4	0.9 (Note: CRA: 0.6%; others: 0.3%)	41	3.7	6.5'
17–18 Oct	Senkyo.com/JX	1,017	24.6	4.7	4.5	4.6	2.8	0.6	2.8	1.8	8.2	2.9	1.8	1.5	5.6	33.6	–	9
16–18 Oct	Yomiuri/NNN	1,019	34	4	3	5	1	0	1	1	2	2	1	0	–	41	5	7
14 Oct	Kazuo Yana resigns as Minister of Agriculture, Forestry and Fisheries.																	
10–12 Oct	NHK	1,184	35.3	2.7	2.7	2.6	1.2	0.5	2.6	0.3	3	2.3	0.7	0.3	0.8 (Note: CRA: 0.4%; others: 0.4%)	38.5	6.4	3.2
9–12 Oct	Jiji Press	1,168	22.1	1.6	1.9	2.7	1.7	0.1	1.4	0.2	1.5	3.4	0.4	0.3	0.1 (Note: CRA: 0.1%)	59.7	2.9	37.6
3–4 Oct	JNN	1,022	34.7	3.2	2.9	3.4	0.6	0.4	2.5	0.3	2.5	2.8	0.8	0.3	0.6	41.4	3.6	6.7
26–27 Sep	Asahi	1,095	30	3	2	4	2	0	2	0	2	2	1	0	1 (Note: CRA: 1%)	43	8	13
26–27 Sep	Mainichi/SSRC	1,944	26	5	4	4	4	1	3	0	4	2	2	1	1	44	–	18
19–20 Sep	ANN	1,034	43.2	4.6	4.1	3.7	2.1	0.3	3.4	0.9	3.2	2.7	2.1	0.8	2.1 (Note: CRA: 1.3%; others: 0.8%)	24.2	2.9	19
17–18 Sep	Nikkei/TV Tokyo	1,007	41	4	4	5	2	0	4	0	4	2	2	0	–	24	8	17
17–18 Sep	Yomiuri/NNN	1,001	35	4	4	5	1	0	2	0	2	2	1	0	1	40	3	5
17–18 Sep	Kyodo News	1,051	36.1	5.9	7.7	6.8	5.2	0.1	3.7	0.4	3.5	2.5	1.8	1	2.5 (Note: CRA: 2.5%)	19.4	3.4	16.7

Fieldwork date	Polling firm	Sample size	LDP	CRA	Ishin	DPFP	Sansei	Mirai	JCP	Reiwa	CDP	Komei	CPJ	SDP	Others	No party	Und./ no ans.	Lead
17 Sep	The Centrist Reform Alliance is dissolved. It is succeeded by Komeito and the Democratic Reform Party. The Second Takaichi cabinet is reshuffled.																	
11–14 Sep	Jiji Press	1,142	23.2	0.4	2.1	2.8	2.2	1.1	1.8	0.4	2.8	3.2	0.5	0.3	–	56.7	3.4	33.5
12–13 Sep	Sankei/FNN	1,017	34.7	1.2	3.1	2.5	4.3	1.6	1.9	0.2	2.1	0.8	0.9	0.2	0.4	42	4.2	7.3
12–13 Sep	Senkyo.com/JX	1,015	25.7	2	5.6	4.7	3.8	3	3.9	3.4	4.5	1.7	1.3	1	1.3	38.1	–	14.4
11–13 Sep	NHK	1,177	35.9	1.2	2.3	2.8	2.5	0.8	2.5	0.2	3.7	2.5	0.7	0.6	0.3	37.6	6.5	1.7
5–6 Sep	JNN	1,036	32.2	1	2.2	2.6	4.4	1.9	2	0.3	2.7	1.2	1.3	0.5	0.6	43.1	4	10.9
4 Sep	Reiwa Shinsengumi changes its name to Party of Life.																	
28–30 Aug	Nikkei/TV Tokyo	1,009	39	2	4	5	4	3	3	0	5	2	1	1	–	27	4	12
28–30 Aug	Asahi	1,143	34	2	2	3	3	2	3	0	3	1	1	0	–	37	9	3
22–23 Aug	ANN	1,043	41.8	1.8	5.1	6.2	3.3	3.3	3.5	0.6	4.7	1.5	0.9	0.8	0.8	24.2	1.5	17.6
22–23 Aug	Kyodo News	1,052	34.9	2.8	5.9	6.9	6.5	4	2.4	0.7	4.8	2.5	1.4	1.3	–	23.4	2.5	11.5
22–23 Aug	Mainichi/SSRC	2,029	24	4	4	5	4	4	3	0	4	1	2	1	–	45	–	21
21–23 Aug	Yomiuri/NNN	1,031	34	2	2	2	4	2	2	0	2	1	1	0	–	41	4	7
15–16 Aug	Senkyo.com/JX	1,016	23.3	4.7	4.3	3.5	5.6	3.5	4.6	1.9	3.7	3.2	1.9	1.8	1	37.1	–	13.8
8–9 Aug	Sankei/FNN	1,012	32.5	1.7	2.4	5.2	4.7	1.2	2.5	0.8	2	1.4	2	0.5	0.2	40.2	2.9	7.7
7–9 Aug	NHK	1,205	35	1.7	2.6	2.8	2.8	1.2	3.4	0.7	2.8	2.2	1	0.2	0.2	39	4.4	4
6–9 Aug	Jiji Press	1,167	24.6	2.1	2.7	1.8	1.5	1	1.5	0.7	1.4	2.4	0.4	0.3	–	56.2	3.4	31.6
1–2 Aug	JNN	1,033	30.9	1.9	2.9	3	2.7	1.4	2.3	0.9	2.4	1.4	0.4	0.2	0.4	46.4	2.8	15.5
31 Jul	Joji Yamamoto succeeds Taro Yamamoto as Leader of Reiwa.																	
25–26 Jul	Kyodo News	1,046	35.9	4.6	5.8	7.2	6.3	6.5	4	1.6	3.8	1.7	1.4	0.4	0.1	18.9	1.8	17
24–26 Jul	Nikkei/TV Tokyo	924	41	3	4	5	6	3	4	1	5	2	2	0	–	21	3	20
24–26 Jul	Yomiuri/NNN	1,058	31	2	3	3	5	2	3	1	3	1	1	0	–	39	7	8
18–19 Jul	ANN	1,027	35.5	2.3	4.6	5.1	6	2.8	3.5	1.3	5	2.6	1.1	0.4	0.9	26.7	2.3	8.8
18–19 Jul	Asahi	1,066	32	3	3	4	4	2	2	0	3	1	1	0	–	36	9	4
18–19 Jul	Mainichi/SSRC	2,006	23	4	4	5	4	5	3	1	4	1	2	0	–	44	–	21
10–13 Jul	Jiji Press	1,142	20.8	1.7	2.3	1.6	2.5	1.2	1.4	0.4	1.1	3	0.4	0.4	–	59.5	3.7	38.7
11–12 Jul	Sankei/FNN	1,010	33.1	3	2	3.9	3	1.7	2.9	0.7	2.3	0.8	0.4	0.2	0.3	41.5	4.2	8.4
11–12 Jul	Senkyo.com/JX	1,027	23.2	5	4.3	4.2	4.9	2.8	3.3	4.5	4.1	2.2	2.9	0.6	1.5	36.6	–	13.4
10–12 Jul	NHK	1,145	35.7	3.1	3.1	3.2	2.9	1	1.5	0.8	2.9	2	0.7	0.5	0.1	37	5.5	1.3
4–5 Jul	JNN	1,037	32.3	4.5	3.2	2.7	3.9	1.4	2.2	0.5	1.4	0.9	1	0.2	0.2	41.8	3.8	9.5
26–28 Jun	Nikkei/TV Tokyo	939	41	3	4	7	6	1	3	1	2	3	1	0	–	22	6	19
20–21 Jun	ANN	1,025	39	2.4	4.1	6.9	4.8	1.9	2.7	1.4	4.2	2.1	0.9	0.3	1.8	24.3	3.1	14.6
20–21 Jun	Asahi	1,041	34	3	3	4	4	1	2	1	2	1	1	0	–	39	5	5
20–21 Jun	Mainichi/SSRC	2,045	27	5	4	6	4	3	3	1	4	1	2	1	–	39	–	12
20–21 Jun	Kyodo News	1,044	38.7	6.1	4.8	6.6	6	4.3	2	1.4	3.5	1.1	1	0.5	0.6	21.1	2.3	17.4
19–21 Jun	Yomiuri/NNN	1,031	39	2	3	5	4	2	2	1	2	2	1	0	–	33	3	6
12–15 Jun	Jiji Press	1,142	22.8	2.1	2.1	2.1	2.9	1.2	1.3	0.4	1.7	2.3	0.9	0.4	–	56.4	3.4	33.6
13–14 Jun	Sankei/FNN	1,016	33.5	3.1	2.5	3.2	4.8	1.5	1.6	1.1	1.8	1.7	0.4	0.3	–	40.8	3.5	7.3
13–14 Jun	Senkyo.com/JX	1,064	25.6	4.1	4	5.7	5.2	2	4.4	1.5	4.4	2.9	2.3	1.1	0.6	36.4	–	10.8
6–7 Jun	JNN	1,021	35.5	1.9	2	3.9	3.6	1	2.4	1.3	3.4	2.3	1.1	0.4	1	37.9	2.4	2.4
5–7 Jun	NHK	1,210	35.7	3.4	3	3	2.9	1.7	2.6	0.6	2.6	2.1	0.7	0.3	0.3	34.7	6.4	1
29–31 May	Nikkei/TV Tokyo	958	39	3	4	7	5	3	3	1	4	2	2	0	–	25	2	14
23–24 May	ANN	1,032	41.1	4.4	3.6	5.2	4.9	1.5	3.5	1.8	3.6	1.4	0.8	0.5	0.9	24.4	2.5	16.7
23–24 May	Mainichi/SSRC	1,780	28	4	3	5	3	4	2	1	3	1	2	0	–	43	1	15
22–24 May	Yomiuri/NNN	1,041	35	3	4	4	3	2	3	2	1	1	1	0	–	38	2	3
15–18 May	Jiji Press	1,172	27.8	2	2.6	2.8	3.7	1.4	2	0.3	1.9	2	0.6	0.1	–	50.4	2.4	22.6
16–17 May	Asahi	1,163	34	3	3	3	5	2	2	1	3	2	1	0	0	36	5	2
16–17 May	Sankei/FNN	1,001	32.8	3.3	3	3.8	4.6	1.6	2.6	1.1	3.1	0.6	0.9	0.2	0.3	37.2	4.9	4.4
16–17 May	Senkyo.com/JX	1,025	26.8	4.9	3.7	3.3	3.4	1.8	3.9	2.1	3	2	3.1	0.9	0.8	40.4	–	13.6
16–17 May	Kyodo News	1,043	36.2	5	6.7	6.9	5.6	4.9	3.2	2.6	3.3	1.3	1.5	0.7	0.5	20.2	1.9	16
8–10 May	NHK	1,188	35.4	2.9	2.1	3.6	2.6	1.9	2.7	1.3	2.5	1.1	0.8	0.2	0.2	37.1	5.7	1.7
2–3 May	JNN	1,026	33.9	3	4	3.4	2.3	2.3	2.3	0.8	1.2	2.3	0.6	0.7	0.3	37.7	5.2	3.8
24–26 Apr	Nikkei/TV Tokyo	955	42	2	4	6	5	3	3	2	4	1	1	1	–	22	4	20
18–19 Apr	ANN	1,025	38.6	3.2	4.2	5.3	4.3	2.1	2.9	1.2	3.2	2.1	1.3	0.7	1.6	26.9	2.6	11.7
18–19 Apr	Asahi	1,147	35	3	2	4	3	2	2	1	1	1	1	0	–	39	6	4
18–19 Apr	Mainichi/SSRC	1,868	27	5	5	5	3	4	3	1	4	1	2	0	–	39	–	12
18–19 Apr	Sankei/FNN	1,006	33	3.2	3.6	4.1	4.1	1.4	2.2	0.8	1.8	1.2	0.9	0.3	–	39.2	4.2	6.2
17–19 Apr	Yomiuri/NNN	1,042	38	3	2	3	6	2	2	1	1	1	1	0	–	35	5	3
10–13 Apr	Jiji Press	1,176	25.7	2.5	2.2	2.9	2.1	2	1.5	0.8	1.3	1.9	0.9	0.3	–	51.5	4.4	25.8
11–12 Apr	Senkyo.com/JX	1,012	25.4	5.3	4.9	3.8	3.8	2.9	3.2	2	3.8	3.2	2.5	0.7	3.2	35.4	–	10
10–12 Apr	NHK	1,129	38.2	2.5	2.9	3.6	2.7	1.8	2.6	0.8	2.7	1.8	1.4	0.4	0.4	32.8	5.5	5.4
4–5 Apr	JNN	1,026	35.5	3.3	3.7	4.7	2.9	1.5	2.2	1.1	2.3	1.6	0.9	0.2	0.8	35.9	3.4	0.4
4–5 Apr	Kyodo News	1,045	40.3	6.1	6.5	6.1	6	4.9	3.8	1.7	3	1.3	1.6	0.6	–	16.4	1.7	23.9
28–29 Mar	Mainichi/SSRC	1,918	28	5	4	6	4	5	2	2	3	1	2	0	–	39	–	11
27–29 Mar	Nikkei/TV Tokyo	941	41	3	4	6	5	3	4	1	4	1	1	0	–	22	5	19
21–22 Mar	ANN	1,017	44.3	5.6	5.1	4	3.9	2.9	2.3	1.4	3.8	2	1.4	0.7	1.2	19.5	2	24.8
20–22 Mar	Yomiuri/NNN	1,012	39	2	2	4	5	3	2	1	1	1	1	1	1	35	2	4
14–15 Mar	Asahi	1,166	35	5	3	4	3	3	3	1	1	1	1	1	1	32	6	3
14–15 Mar	Sankei/FNN	1,009	31.8	5.7	3.7	4.8	5.3	3.7	1.7	1.3	1.7	1.2	1.7	0.3	–	34.5	2	2.7
14–15 Mar	Senkyo.com/JX	1,004	27.1	6.5	4.5	6.6	3.5	3.4	3.5	3	2.7	1.8	1.7	0.9	2	32.9	–	5.8
6–9 Mar	Jiji Press	1,150	26.9	3.7	2.4	3.8	3.7	3.2	1.1	0.7	0.8	0.8	0.9	0.3	–	49.4	2.3	22.5
7–8 Mar	Kyodo News	1,054	37.7	6.3	7.2	5.6	5.8	3.7	3.5	1.3	2	1.2	3.2	0.5	2	16.9	3.1	20.8
6–8 Mar	NHK	1,204	33.6	6.2	4	4.1	3.1	3.1	2.2	1.1	2.2	1.2	0.5	0.2	0.3	32	6.2	1.6
28 Feb – 1 Mar	JNN	1,028	37.3	4.9	3.8	3.5	4.6	4.2	2	1.7	0.4	0.6	0.6	0.4	0.4	31.8	3.8	5.5
21–22 Feb	ANN	1,011	39.9	9.9	5.5	5.5	4.1	4.6	3.8	1.8	1.9	1.4	0.9	0.9	0.5	15.8	3.5	24.1
21–22 Feb	Mainichi/SSRC	1,982	29	5	6	7	3	6	2	1	2	1	2	1	–	35	–	6
18–19 Feb	Yomiuri/NNN	954	43	5	3	5	4	6	2	1	1	0	2	0	1	24	3	19
18 Feb	The Second Takaichi cabinet is formed.																	
13–16 Feb	Jiji Press	1,114	30.1	6.3	2.4	3.6	2.6	2.2	2	0.8	0.7	0.9	0.8	0.3	–	45.4	1.9	15.3
14–15 Feb	Asahi	1,226	35	7	4	5	4	3	3	1	1	0	0	1	1	31	4	4
14–15 Feb	Sankei/FNN	1,008	39.4	7.6	3.8	5.3	4.3	4.9	2.2	0.9	0.8	0.6	1.4	0.9	–	24.7	3.2	14.7
14–15 Feb	Senkyo.com/JX	1,038	28.5	10	5.2	6.1	5.2	3.3	3.7	1.1	w. CRA	w. CRA	2	2.7	2	30.3	–	1.8
13–15 Feb	NHK	1,188	39.9	8.1	3.2	3.3	2.6	2.8	2.9	1.1	0.8	1.2	1.1	0.8	0.3 (Note: Genyu: 0.3%)	27.5	4.5	12.4
13 Feb	Junya Ogawa succeeds Yoshihiko Noda and Tetsuo Saito as Leader of the Centrist Reform Alliance.																	
13–15 Feb	Nikkei/TV Tokyo	946	41	8	5	7	6	6	3	2	2	1	1	–	–	17	1	24
9–10 Feb	Kyodo News	1,049	40.8	6.5	7.2	8.3	6.6	5.8	3.4	2.2	1.2	0.6	1.9	0.3	0.5	12.8	1.9	28
9–10 Feb	Yomiuri/NNN	1,037	40	7	4	5	5	4	2	2	0	1	1	0	1	23	3	17
8 Feb	Election results	55.7% (Note: Election turnout.)	36.7	18.2	8.6	9.7	7.4	6.7	4.4	2.9	w. CRA	w. CRA	2.5	1.3	1.4 (Note: Genyu: 1.42%; Others: 0.02%)	–		18.5

== Voting intention (proportional vote) ==
=== 2026 ===
Fieldwork date	Polling firm	Sample size	LDP	Ishin	DPFP	Sansei	Mirai	DRP	JCP	Life	CDP	Komei	CPJ	SDP	Others	None/Und.	No ans.	Lead
17–18 Oct	Senkyo.com/JX	1,017	31.2	7.9	5.7	8.2	5.7	0.2	5.3	0.5	9.2	4	2.9	0.8	1.9	16.7	–	14.5

Fieldwork date	Polling firm	Sample size	LDP	CRA	Ishin	DPFP	Sansei	Mirai	JCP	Reiwa	CDP	Komei	CPJ	SDP	Others	None/Und.	No ans.	Lead
12–13 Sep	Senkyo.com/JX	1,015	29.5	3.7	7.8	9.2	6	7	6.7	1	6	1.9	3	0.5	2.8	15	–	14.5
15–16 Aug	Senkyo.com/JX	1,016	25.4	6.4	6.8	9.3	8.6	6.2	6.5	1	6	2.4	4.7	0.7	2.5	13.6	–	10.6
11–12 Jul	Senkyo.com/JX	1,027	28.4	6.8	6.6	7.3	8.1	4.3	6	1.7	5.4	2.2	4.7	0.9	1.9	15.7	–	12.7
13–14 Jun	Senkyo.com/JX	1,064	31	7.1	6.1	8.4	7.7	5.5	5.9	1.8	5.3	1.9	4.1	1.4	1.6	12.2	–	16.7
16–17 May	Senkyo.com/JX	1,025	34.3	8.2	5.2	7.1	5.9	4.2	6.2	1.5	4.9	1.4	3.9	0.7	1.2	15.3	–	19
11–12 Apr	Senkyo.com/JX	1,012	33.3	8.4	5.4	8.8	6.9	5.5	4.6	2.2	5.5	2.3	3.4	0.4	1.3	12.1	–	17.1
14–15 Mar	Senkyo.com/JX	1,004	32.4	9.4	6.2	11.5	4.2	8.2	5.8	1.5	3.3	2	2.8	0.6	2	10.1	–	17.7
8 Feb	Election results	55.7%	36.7	18.2	8.6	9.7	7.4	6.7	4.4	2.9	w. CRA	w. CRA	2.5	1.3	1.4 (Note: Genyu: 1.42%; Others: 0.02%)	–		18.5

== Preferred coalition ==
=== 2026 ===
Fieldwork date	Polling firm	Sample size	LDP	LDP–Ishin–led coalition	LDP–Ishin with other parties	Others	Und./ no ans.
14–15 Feb	Sankei/FNN	1,008	9	34.8	26.5 (Note: LDP-Ishin-DPFP: 26.5%)	24.1	5.6

== Preferred prime minister ==
=== 2026 ===
Fieldwork date	Polling firm	Sample size	Sanae Takaichi	Shinjirō Koizumi	Yoshimasa Hayashi	Takayuki Kobayashi	Toshimitsu Motegi	Others	NOT/ UD/NA
24–25 Oct	Mainichi/SSRC	2,001	27	12	10	2	3	7	38
19–20 Sep	ANN	1,034	38	21	12	5	5	5	15

== Cabinet approval/disapproval ratings ==
=== Sanae Takaichi ===
Approval Polling for the Takaichi Cabinet.

==== 2026 ====
Fieldwork date	Polling firm	Sample size	Approve	Disapprove	Und. / no answer	Lead
13–16 Nov	Jiji Press	1,142	42.8	28.5	28.7	14.3f
14–15 Nov	ANN	1,012	50.8	30	19.2	20.8
14–15 Nov	Asahi	959	49	36	15	13
14–15 Nov	Kyodo News	1,049	50.4	34.4	15.2	16
14–15 Nov	Sankei/FNN	1,015	60.6	32.3	7.1	28.3
13–15 Nov	Yomiuri/NNN	1,033	58	30	12	28
6–8 Nov	NHK	1,195	53	32.1	14.9	20.9
31 Oct – 1 Nov	JNN	1,024	64.9	32.5	2.6	32.4
24–25 Oct	Mainichi/SSRC	2,001	45	41	14	4
23–25 Oct	Nikkei/TV Tokyo	945	62	31	7	31
17–18 Oct	ANN	1,018	47.1	33.3	19.7	13.8
17–18 Oct	Asahi	1,108	50	35	15	15
17–18 Oct	Kyodo News	1,050	49.1	33	17.9	16.1
17–18 Oct	Sankei/FNN	1,014	62.6	32.3	5.1	30.3
17–18 Oct	Senkyo.com/JX	1,017	48.7 (Note: Strongly approve: 23.2%; Approve on balance: 25.5%)	32.3 (Note: Disapprove on balance: 12.1%; Strongly disapprove: 20.2%)	19	16.4
16–18 Oct	Yomiuri/NNN	1,019	57	30	13	27
10–12 Oct	NHK	1,184	50.8	32	17.1	18.8
9–12 Oct	Jiji Press	1,168	42.4	29.7	27.9	12.7
3–4 Oct	JNN	1,022	63	33.9	3.1	29.1
26–27 Sep	Asahi	1,095	51	33	16	18
26–27 Sep	Mainichi/SSRC	1,944	45	40	15	5
19–20 Sep	ANN	1,034	58.3	27.6	14.1	30.7
17–18 Sep	Kyodo News	1,051	53.4	30.9	15.7	22.5
17–18 Sep	Nikkei/TV Tokyo	1,007	62	33	5	29
17–18 Sep	Yomiuri/NNN	1,001	59	30	11	29
11–14 Sep	Jiji Press	1,142	44.1	29.3	26.6	14.8
12–13 Sep	Sankei/FNN	1,017	61.6	32.2	6.2	29.4
12–13 Sep	Senkyo.com/JX	1,015	50.8 (Note: Strongly approve: 23.3%; Approve on balance: 27.5%)	32 (Note: Disapprove on balance: 12.4%; Strongly disapprove: 20.2%)	16.6	18.8
11–13 Sep	NHK	1,177	52.8	30.8	16.3	22
5–6 Sep	JNN	1,036	62.5	34.9	2.6	27.6
28–30 Aug	Nikkei/TV Tokyo	1,009	62	32	6	30
28–30 Aug	Asahi	1,143	53	33	14	20
22–23 Aug	ANN	1,043	55.4	29.9	14.7	25.5
22–23 Aug	Kyodo News	1,052	50.2	33.9	15.9	16.3
22–23 Aug	Mainichi/SSRC	2,029	41	44	15	3
21–23 Aug	Yomiuri/NNN	1,031	56	32	12	24
15–16 Aug	Senkyo.com/JX	1,016	45.9 (Note: Strongly approve: 21%; Approve on balance: 24.9%)	36.3 (Note: Disapprove on balance: 12.2%; Strongly disapprove: 24.1%)	17.9	9.6
8–9 Aug	Sankei/FNN	1,012	62.5	32	6.5	30.5
7–9 Aug	NHK	1,205	52.8	33.2	14	19.6
6–9 Aug	Jiji Press	1,167	48.4	26.9	24.7	21.5
1–2 Aug	JNN	1,033	59.2	37.6	3.2	21.6
25–26 Jul	Kyodo News	1,046	53.7	33.7	12.6	20
24–26 Jul	Nikkei/TV Tokyo	924	58	37	6	21
24–26 Jul	Yomiuri/NNN	1,058	57	34	9	23
18–19 Jul	ANN	1,027	49.2	34.8	16.1	14.4
18–19 Jul	Asahi	1,066	53	35	12	18
18–19 Jul	Mainichi/SSRC	2,006	41	44	14	3
10–13 Jul	Jiji Press	1,142	49	25.2	25.8	23.8
11–12 Jul	Sankei/FNN	1,010	61.6	30.8	7.6	30.8
11–12 Jul	Senkyo.com/JX	1,027	50.4 (Note: Strongly approve: 23%; Approve on balance: 27.4%)	34.9 (Note: Disapprove on balance: 11.4%; Strongly disapprove: 23.5%)	14.7	15.5
10–12 Jul	NHK	1,145	57.8	26.7	15.5	31.1
4–5 Jul	JNN	1,037	65.9	30.8	3.3	35.1
26–28 Jun	Nikkei/TV Tokyo	939	68	27	5	41
20–21 Jun	ANN	1,025	60.1	23	16.8	37.1
20–21 Jun	Asahi	1,041	60	27	13	33
20–21 Jun	Mainichi/SSRC	2,045	51	35	14	16
20–21 Jun	Kyodo News	1,044	55.8	27.9	16.3	27.9
19–21 Jun	Yomiuri/NNN	1,031	69	21	10	48
12–15 Jun	Jiji Press	1,142	54.3	22.2	23.5	32.1
13–14 Jun	Sankei/FNN	1,016	65.3	28.1	6.5	37.2
13–14 Jun	Senkyo.com/JX	1,064	56 (Note: Strongly approve: 25.7%; Approve on balance: 30.3%)	28.8 (Note: Disapprove on balance: 12.7%; Strongly disapprove: 16.1%)	15.2	27.2
6–7 Jun	JNN	1,021	70	27.4	2.6	42.6
5–7 Jun	NHK	1,210	60.1	25.8	14.1	34.3
29–31 May	Nikkei/TV Tokyo	958	66	28	6	38
23–24 May	ANN	1,032	61.8	26.1	12.1	35.7
23–24 May	Mainichi/SSRC	1,780	50	33	17	17
22–24 May	Yomiuri/NNN	1,041	64	27	9	37
15–18 May	Jiji Press	1,172	59.4	19.7	20.9	39.7
16–17 May	Asahi	1,163	60	26	14	34
16–17 May	Sankei/FNN	1,001	68	26.2	5.8	41.8
16–17 May	Senkyo.com/JX	1,025	57.4 (Note: Strongly approve: 28.7%; Approve on balance: 28.7%)	26.4 (Note: Disapprove on balance: 9.8%; Strongly disapprove: 16.6%)	16.2	31
16–17 May	Kyodo News	1,043	61.3	26.8	11.9	34.5
8–10 May	NHK	1,188	60.7	23.2	16.1	37.5
2–3 May	JNN	1,026	74.2	24.3	1.5	49.9
24–26 Apr	Nikkei/TV Tokyo	955	69	26	5	43
18–19 Apr	ANN	1,017	62.3	21.5	16.1	40.8
18–19 Apr	Asahi	1,147	64	24	12	40
18–19 Apr	Mainichi/SSRC	1,868	53	33	14	20
18–19 Apr	Sankei/FNN	1,006	70.2	25.1	4.7	45.1
17–19 Apr	Yomiuri/NNN	1,042	66	24	10	42
10–13 Apr	Jiji Press	1,176	59.1	19.2	21.7	39.9
11–12 Apr	Senkyo.com/JX	1,004	55.9 (Note: Strongly approve: 30.4%; Approve on balance: 25.5%)	26.9 (Note: Disapprove on balance: 11.5%; Strongly disapprove: 15.4%)	17.2	29
10–12 Apr	NHK	1,129	61.2	21.5	17.3	39.7
1–7 Apr	Morning Consult	N/A	53	35	12	18
4–5 Apr	JNN	1,026	71.5	23.7	4.8	47.8
4–5 Apr	Kyodo News	1,045	63.8	26	10.2	37.8
28–29 Mar	Mainichi/SSRC	1,918	58	28	14	30
27–29 Mar	Nikkei/TV Tokyo	941	72	23	5	49
21–22 Mar	ANN	1,017	65.2	19.3	15.4	45.9
20–22 Mar	Yomiuri/NNN	1,012	71	20	9	51
14–15 Mar	Asahi	1,166	61	26	13	35
14–15 Mar	Sankei/FNN	1,008	67.1	28.5	4.4	38.6
14–15 Mar	Senkyo.com/JX	1,004	56.1 (Note: Strongly approve: 30.1%; Approve on balance: 26%)	28 (Note: Disapprove on balance: 11.1%; Strongly disapprove: 16.9%)	15.9	28.1
6–9 Mar	Jiji Press	1,150	59.3	20.3	20.4	39
7–8 Mar	Kyodo News	1,054	64.1	24	11.9	40.1
6–8 Mar	NHK	1,204	58.6	25.7	15.7	33.1
2–8 Mar	Morning Consult	N/A	56	33	11	23
28 Feb – 1 Mar	JNN	1,028	71.8	24.9	3.3	46.9
21–22 Feb	ANN	1,011	62	24.2	13.8	37.8
21–22 Feb	Mainichi/SSRC	1,982	61	25	14	36
18–19 Feb	Yomiuri/NNN	954	73	17	10	56
18 Feb	The Second Takaichi cabinet is formed.					
13–16 Feb	Jiji Press	1,114	63.8	18.4	17.8	45.4
14–15 Feb	Asahi	1,226	63	24	13	39
14–15 Feb	Sankei/FNN	1,008	72	22.8	5.2	50.8
14–15 Feb	Senkyo.com/JX	1,038	63.6 (Note: Strongly approve: 35.2%; Approve on balance: 28.4%)	23.3 (Note: Disapprove on balance: 9.5%; Strongly disapprove: 13.8%)	13.2	40.3
13–15 Feb	NHK	1,188	65.2	20.1	14.6	45.1
13–15 Feb	Nikkei/TV Tokyo	946	69	26	5	43
9–10 Feb	Kyodo News	1,049	67.3	23.9	8.8	43.4
9–10 Feb	Yomiuri/NNN	1,037	67	22	10	45

== See also ==
- Opinion polling for the 2026 Japanese general election
- Opinion polling for the 2024 Japanese general election
- Opinion polling for the 2021 Japanese general election
