= June 2010 Democratic Party of Japan leadership election =

Political party election in Japan

- 4 June 2010
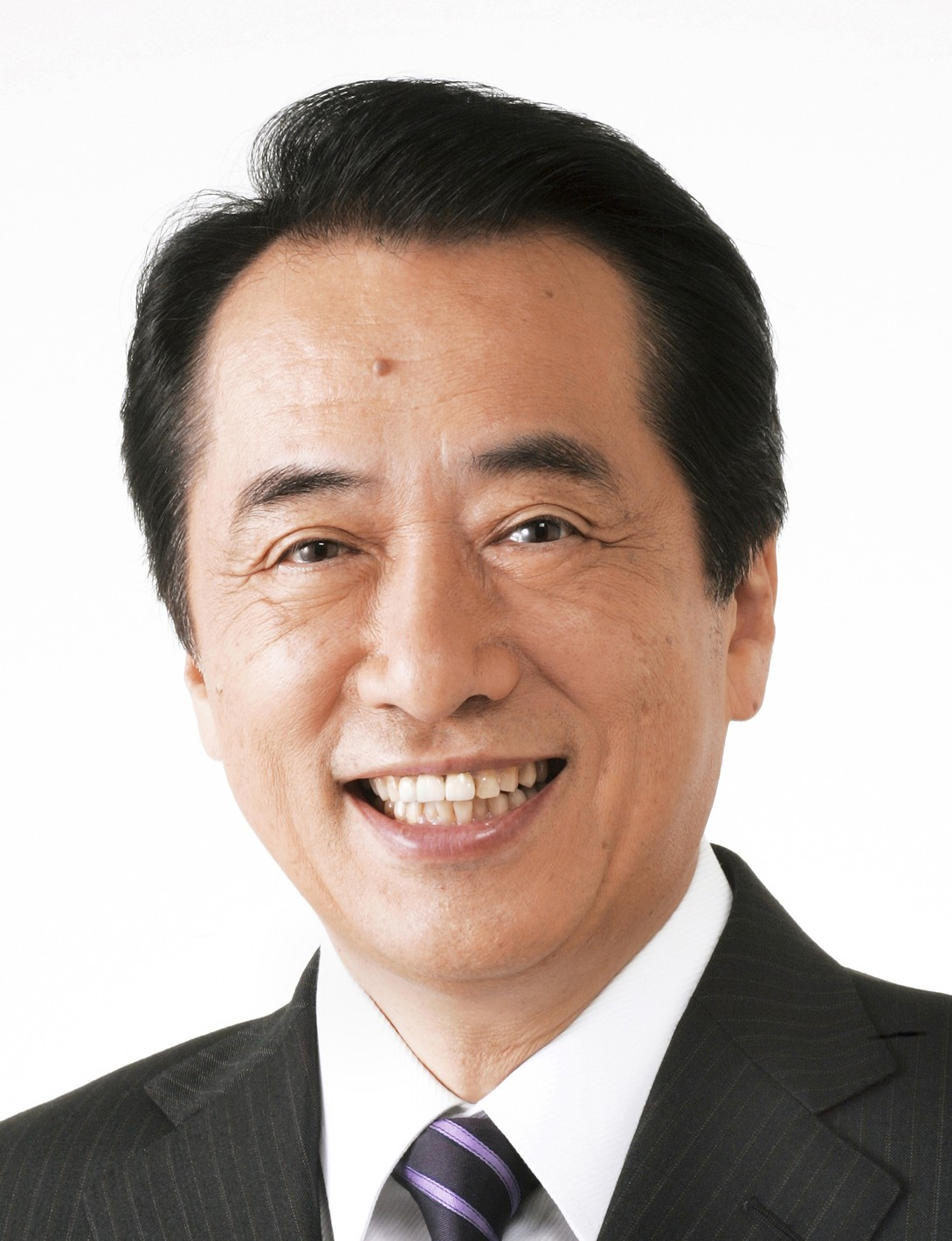

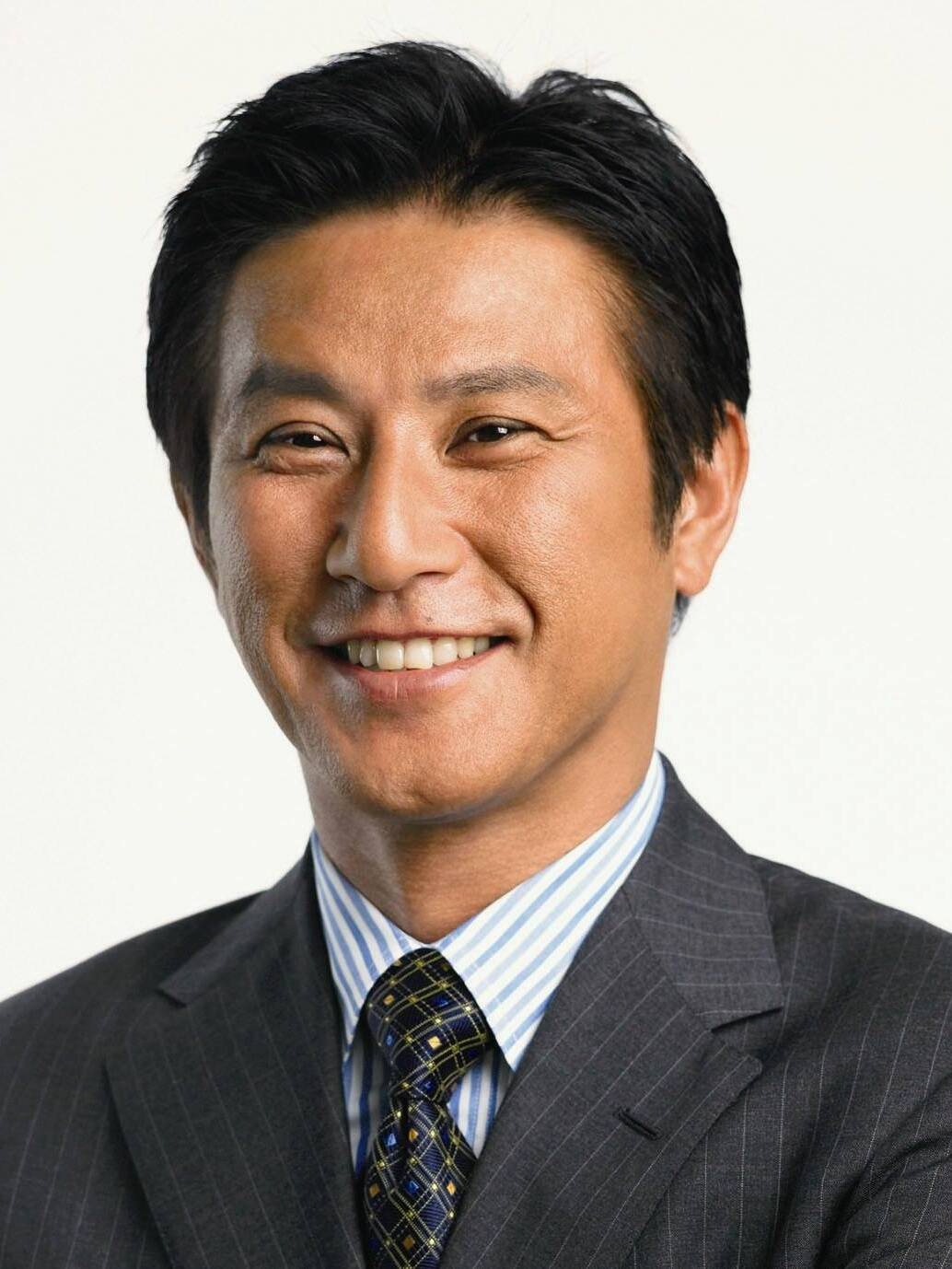
Candidate	Naoto Kan	Shinji Tarutoko
Leader's seat	Tokyo 18th	Osaka 12th
Caucus vote	291	129
Percentage	69.3%	30.7%
President before election
Yukio Hatoyama
Elected President
Naoto Kan

The June 2010 Democratic Party of Japan leadership election was held on 4 June 2010. The election was held to replace outgoing president and Prime Minister Yukio Hatoyama, who resigned on 2 June amid plunging approval ratings and his failure to relocate the Futenma military base.

Finance minister and deputy prime minister Naoto Kan was elected president, defeating backbencher Shinji Tarutoko by 291 votes to 129. He was elected Prime Minister by the Diet and formally appointed by Emperor Akihito on 8 June.

== Background ==
The Democratic Party won the August 2009 Japanese general election in a landslide, ushering in the first non-Liberal Democratic-led government since 1994 and marking the first time a party other than the LDP won a parliamentary majority since 1952. Yukio Hatoyama became Prime Minister, and initially recorded approval ratings of over 70%. However, early struggles and scandals implicating Hatoyama and DPJ secretary-general Ichirō Ozawa caused the cabinet's approval to decline to 50% by the new year. The government continued to struggle to reduce the budget deficit and implement their policy pledges. Throughout his tenure, Hatoyama also attempted to negotiate with the United States to relocate the Futenma military base outside of Okinawa, but failed to make progress. He admitted defeat at the end of May, prompting the pacifist Social Democratic Party to withdraw from the governing coalition, damaging the government's legislative position. By this time, Hatoyama's approval rating had fallen to around 20% with disapproval approaching 70%. These factors, combined with the upcoming upper house elections, prompted him to announce his resignation. Ozawa simultaneously resigned as DPJ secretary-general.

== Electoral system ==
Candidates were required to gather endorsements from twenty (maximum 25) of the party's members of the National Diet in order to stand. Each Diet member was eligible to vote (423 total). If no candidate won more than 50% of votes, a runoff was to be held the same day. Nominations were taken on the 4th and the election held the same day.

== Candidates ==
Finance minister Naoto Kan was understood to be the frontrunner. He secured the backing of most of the party's factions on both left and right, including speculative rivals foreign minister Katsuya Okada, infrastructure and transport minister Seiji Maehara, and Yoshihiko Noda, who endorsed him. He was also supported by the ex-JSP and ex-DSP factions. The only other candidate to stand was Shinji Tarutoko, chairman of the Diet environment committee, who campaigned on "generational change" and was supported by parts of Ichirō Ozawa's faction.

Candidate	Offices held
Naoto Kan (age 63); Tokyo	Member of the House of Representatives (1980–); President of the Democratic Party of Japan (1996–99, 2002–04); Minister of Finance (2010–); Deputy Prime Minister of Japan (2009–)
Shinji Tarutoko (age 49); Osaka Prefecture	Member of the House of Representatives (1993–2005, 2009–)

=== Sponsors ===
Naoto Kan (25)	Shinji Tarutoko (25)
House of Representatives: Hirotaka Akamatsu; Yukio Edano; Kazue Fujita; Shinichiro Furumoto; Kōichirō Genba; Yuichi Goto; Yoshio Hachiro; Shoichi Kondo; Kazuko Kōri; Seiji Maehara; Seishu Makino; Kansei Nakano; Yoshihiko Noda; Katsuya Okada; Kensuke Onishi; Miho Takai; Keishu Tanaka; House of Councillors: Tetsuro Fukuyama; Akira Gunji; Shinkun Haku; Emi Kaneko; Shoukichi Kina; Toru Matsuoka; Toshio Ogawa; Renhō	House of Representatives: Yutaka Banno; Takeshi Hidaka; Toshikazu Higuchi; Koichiro Katsumata; Taketsuka Kimura; Takatane Kiuchi; Atsushi Kumada; Takeaki Matsumoto; Wakio Mitsui; Hiroyuki Moriyama; Kentaro Motomura; Koichi Mukoyama; Fumiyoshi Murakami; Takashi Nagao; Masazumi Nakajima; Hirofumi Ryu; Takehiro Sakaguchi; Seiki Soramoto; Hideyuki Takahashi; Denny Tamaki; Akashi Uchikoshi; Akira Uchiyama; Gōsei Yamamoto; House of Councillors: Masashi Mito; Koji Sato

== Results ==
Candidate	Votes	%
Naoto Kan	291	69.3
Shinji Tarutoko	129	30.7
Total	420	100.00
Invalid	2	
Turnout	422	99.8
Eligible	423	
Source: DPJ Archive
