= Kanagawa 16th district =

Legislative district of Japan

Kanagawa 16th District
- Parliamentary constituency for the Japanese House of Representatives
- Numbered map of Kanagawa Prefecture single-member districts
- Prefecture: Kanagawa
- Proportional District: Southern Kanto
- Electorate: 385,191 （as of June 1, 2023）

Current constituency
- Created: 1994
- Seats: One
- Party: LDP
- Representative: Masashi Sato
- Created from: Kanagawa 5th "medium-sized" district
- Municipalities: Atsugi City, Isehara City, Ebina City

Kanagawa 16th district is an electoral district for the Japanese House of Representatives located in Kanagawa Prefecture. The district covers the cities of Atsugi, Isehara and Ebina

== List of representatives ==
Election	Representative	Party	Notes
1996	Yoshiyuki Kamei	LDP	
2000	Yoshiyuki Kamei	LDP	
2003	Yoshiyuki Kamei	LDP	
2005	Yoshiyuki Kamei	LDP	
2006	Zentaro Kamei	LDP	by-election following the death of Yoshiyuki Kamei.
2009	Yūichi Gotō	DPJ	
2012	Hiroyuki Yoshiie	LDP	
2014	Yūichi Gotō	DPJ	
2017	Hiroyuki Yoshiie	LDP	
2021	Yūichi Gotō	CDP	
2024	Yūichi Gotō	CDP	
2026	Masashi Sato	LDP	

== Election results ==
=== 2026 ===
2026
Party	Candidate	Votes	%	±%
LDP	Masashi Sato	105,984	52.87	▲19.35
Centrist Reform	Yūichi Gotō (Incumbent) (elected in S. Kanto PR block)	94,464	47.13	▼3.27
Majority		11,520	5.74	▼11.14
Registered electors		383,206		
Turnout		200,448	54.13	▲0.86
LDP gain from Centrist Reform				

=== 2024 ===
2024
Party	Candidate	Votes	%	±%
CDP	Yūichi Gotō (Incumbent)	100,677	50.40	▼4.20
LDP	Hiroyuki Yoshiie	66,952	33.52	▼11.88
Ishin	Mie Isaji	16,325	8.17	New
JCP	Mizue Yamamoto	11,437	5.73	New
Independent	Katsuo Yoshimura	4,364	2.18	N/A
Majority		33,725	16.88	▲7.68
Registered electors		385,502		
Turnout		199,755	53.27	▼2.08
CDP hold				

=== 2021 ===
2021
Party	Candidate	Age	Votes	%	±%	Loss ratio	Supports	Notes
CDP	Yūichi Gotō	52	137,558	54.60%	▲13.79%	ー		
LDP	Hiroyuki Yoshiie	50	114,396	45.40%	▼1.51%	83.16%	Kōmei	He was elected in PR.

=== 2017 ===
2017
Party	Candidate	Age	Votes	%	±% 先	Loss ratio	Supports	Notes
LDP	Hiroyuki Yoshiie	46	110,508	46.91%	▲1.74%	ー	Kōmei	
Kibō	Yūichi Gotō	48	96,128	40.81%	▼5.02%	86.99%		He was elected in PR.
JCP	Hirohide Ikeda	54	28,927	12.28%	▲3.28%	26.18%		

=== 2014 ===
2014
Party	Candidate	Age	Votes	%	±%	Loss ratio	Supports	Notes
DPJ	Yūichi Gotō	45	103,116	45.83%	▲8.49%	ー		
LDP	Hiroyuki Yoshiie	43	101,627	45.17%	▲4.51%	98.56%	Kōmei	He was elected in PR.
JCP	Hirohide Ikeda	52	20,243	9.00%	▲2.63%	19.63%		

=== 2012 ===
2012
Party	Candidate	Age	Votes	%	±%	Loss ratio	Supports	Notes
LDP	Hiroyuki Yoshiie	41	98,958	40.66%	ー	ー	Kōmei, NRP	
DPJ	Yūichi Gotō	43	90,881	37.34%	▼21.46%	91.84%	PNP	He was elected in PR.
JSP	Yoshinobu Tomiyama	41	38,058	15.64%	ー	38.46%	YP	
JCP	Hirohide Ikeda	50	15,494	6.37%	ー	15.66%		

=== 2009 ===
2009
Party	Candidate	Age	Votes	%	±%	Loss ratio	Supports	Notes
DPJ	Yūichi Gotō	40	167,721	58.80%	▲18.53%	ー		
LDP	Zentarō Kamei	38	113,341	39.74%	▼15.05%	67.58%		
HRP	Masamitsu Sumiyoshi	35	4,166	1.46%	ー	2.48%		

=== 2006 ===
2006
Party	Candidate	Age	Votes	%	±%	Loss ratio	Supports	Notes
LDP	Zentarō Kamei	35	109,464	54.79%	ー	ー		
DPJ	Yūichi Gotō	37	80,450	40.27%	ー	ー		
JCP	Takashi Kasaki	60	9,862	4.94%	ー	ー		

=== 2005 ===
2005
Party	Candidate	Age	Votes	%	±%	Loss ratio	Supports	Notes
LDP	Yoshiyuki Kamei	69	159,268	59.26%	▲3.90%	ー		
DPJ	Hidetomo Nagata	31	87,991	32.74%	▼3.99%	55.25%		
JCP	Chisato Hiyama	42	21,504	8.00%	▲0.09%	13.50%		

=== 2003 ===
2003
Party	Candidate	Age	Votes	%	±%	Loss ratio	Supports	Notes
LDP	Yoshiyuki Kamei	67	125,067	55.36%	▲3.21%	ー		
DPJ	Hidetomo Nagata	29	82,967	36.73%	ー	66.34%		
JCP	Chisato Hiyama	40	17,877	7.91%	ー	14.29%		

=== 2000 ===
2000
Party	Candidate	Age	Votes	%	±%	Loss ratio	Supports	Notes
LDP	Yoshiyuki Kamei	64	99,966	52.15%	▲1.00%	ー		
DPJ	Takashi Sanzyo	37	53,262	27.78%	ー	53.28%		
JCP	Kunio Sakai	57	21,562	11.25%	ー	21.57%		
LL	Shinichi Koizumi	52	16,911	8.82%	▼6.70%	16.92%		
