= Hiroyuki Yoshiie =

Japanese politician

- 義家 弘介
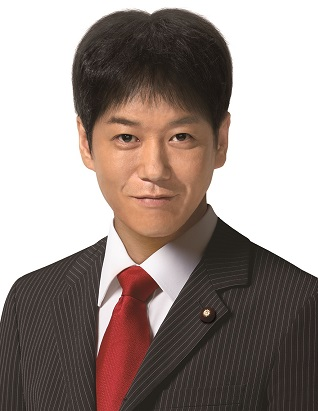
- Official portrait, 2007

Member of the House of Representatives; from Southern Kanto
- In office 19 December 2012 – 9 October 2024
- Preceded by: Yūichi Gotō
- Succeeded by: Multi-member district
- Constituency: Kanagawa 16th (2012–2014); PR block (2014–2017); Kanagawa 16th (2017–2021); PR block (2021–2024)

Member of the House of Councillors
- In office 30 July 2007 – 30 November 2012
- Preceded by: Multi-member district
- Succeeded by: Keizō Takemi
- Constituency: National PR

Personal details
- Born: 義家弘介 (Hiroyuki Yoshiie); 31 March 1971 (age 55) Nagano City, Nagano, Japan
- Party: Liberal Democratic
- Education: Meiji Gakuin University
- Website: Official website

Hiroyuki Yoshiie (義家 弘介, Yoshiie Hiroyuki; born March 31, 1971) is a former Japanese politician of the Liberal Democratic Party, who served as a member of the House of Representatives in the Diet (national legislature). He has also held a professorship at Shoin University. A native of Nagano Prefecture and graduate of Meiji Gakuin University, he was elected to his first term in 2012. In 2021, he was the Chairman of the Judicial Affairs Committee.

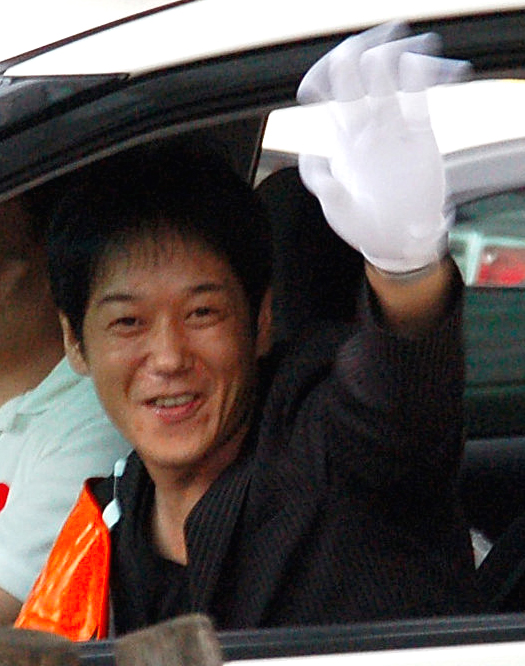
Yoshiie in 2007
