= Masashi Sato =

Japanese politician (born 1994)

- 佐藤 主迪
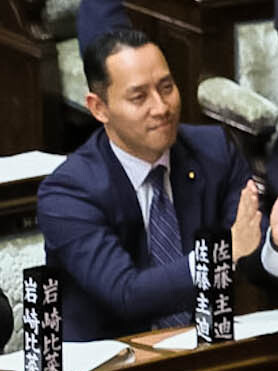
- Sato in 2026

Member of the House of Representatives
- Incumbent
- Assumed office 8 February 2026
- Preceded by: Yūichi Gotō
- Constituency: Kanagawa 16th

Personal details
- Born: 4 September 1994 (age 32) Ōsaki, Miyagi, Japan
- Party: Liberal Democratic
- Education: University of Tokyo

Masashi Sato (佐藤主迪, Sato Masashi; born 4 September 1994) is a Japanese politician serving as a member of the House of Representatives since 2026. From 2018 to 2025, he worked at Mitsubishi UFJ Securities. From 2017 to 2018, he worked at Barclays.
