= Yoshiyuki Kamei =

Japanese politician (1936–2006)

- 亀井 善之
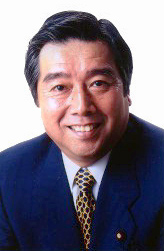
- Official portrait, 2003

Minister of Agriculture, Forestry and Fisheries
- In office 1 April 2003 – 27 September 2004
- Prime Minister: Junichiro Koizumi
- Preceded by: Tadamori Oshima
- Succeeded by: Yoshinobu Shimamura

Minister of Transport
- In office 11 January 1996 – 7 November 1996
- Prime Minister: Ryutaro Hashimoto
- Preceded by: Takeo Hiranuma
- Succeeded by: Makoto Koga

Member of the House of Representatives
- In office 8 July 1986 – 12 May 2006
- Preceded by: Mitsuo Tomizuka
- Succeeded by: Zentaro Kamei
- Constituency: Kanagawa 5th (1986–1996); Kanagawa 16th (1996–2006)
- In office 30 October 1979 – 28 November 1983
- Preceded by: Takeshi Hirabayashi
- Succeeded by: Katsu Kawamura
- Constituency: Kanagawa 5th

Personal details
- Born: 30 April 1936 Isehara, Kanagawa, Japan
- Died: 12 May 2006 (aged 70) Shinjuku, Tokyo, Japan
- Party: Liberal Democratic
- Children: Zentaro Kamei
- Parent: Zenjō Kamei (father)
- Education: Keio University

Yoshiyuki Kamei (亀井 善之, Kamei Yoshiyuki; 30 April 1936 – 12 May 2006) was a Japanese politician who served as a member of the House of Representatives representing Kanagawa Prefecture.

== Biography ==
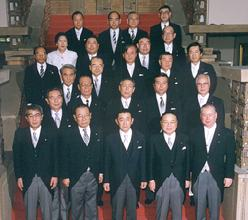
Kamei with members of the First Hashimoto Cabinet (at the Prime Minister's Official Residence on 11 January 1996)

Yoshiyuki Kamei was born on 30 April 1936. He graduated from Keio University in 1962.

He was Minister of Agriculture, Forestry and Fisheries in the cabinet of Junichiro Koizumi, before being replaced by Yoshinobu Shimamura. He had also previously served as Transport Minister under Ryutaro Hashimoto.

Kamei died on 12 May 2006. He was 70.

House of Representatives (Japan)
Preceded by Masami Tanabu	Chair, Lower House Committee on Transport; 1991	Succeeded by Fumio Kyūma
Preceded by Takeo Hiranuma	Chair, Lower House Committee on Rules and Administration; 1997–1998	Succeeded by Hidenao Nakagawa
Political offices
Preceded by Takeo Hiranuma	Minister of Transport; 1996	Succeeded by Makoto Koga
Preceded by Tadamori Oshima	Minister of Agriculture, Forestry and Fisheries; 2003–2004	Succeeded by Yoshinobu Shimamura
