= Yūichi Gotō =

Japanese politician

- 後藤 祐一
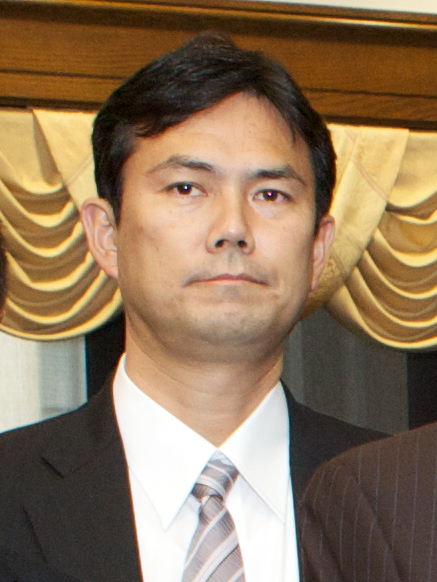
- Goto in 2014

Chair of the Democratic Reform Party Diet Affairs Committee
- Incumbent
- Assumed office 24 September 2026
- Preceded by: Office established

Member of the House of Representatives; from Southern Kanto
- Incumbent
- Assumed office 30 August 2009
- Preceded by: Zentaro Kamei
- Constituency: See list: Kanagawa 16th (2009–2012); PR block (2012–2014); Kanagawa 16th (2014–2017); PR block (2017–2021); Kanagawa 16th (2021–2026); PR block (2026–present)

Personal details
- Born: 25 March 1969 (age 57) Yokohama, Kanagawa Prefecture, Japan
- Party: DRP (since 2026)
- Other political affiliations: DPJ (2006–2016); DP (2016–2017); KnT (2017–2018); DPP (2018–2020); CDP (2020–2026); CRA (2026)
- Education: University of Tokyo (LLB)
- Occupation: Civil servant (Ministry of International Trade and Industry / Ministry of Economy, Trade and Industry)
- Website: www.jitsugen.jp

Yūichi Gotō (born 25 March 1969) is a Japanese politician and former civil servant at the Ministry of International Trade and Industry (MITI) and the Ministry of Economy, Trade and Industry (METI). He is a member of the House of Representatives representing the Democratic Reform Party and serves as the caucus's Chair of the Committee on Diet Affairs.

Has served as the official in charge of policy pledges for the Party of Hope, Acting Policy Research Council Chair for the former Democratic Party for the People, and both Chief of the Executive Office and Acting Secretary-General of the Constitutional Democratic Party of Japan.

== Early life and education ==
Yūichi Gotō was born in Yokohama, Kanagawa Prefecture. He graduated from Sagamihara City Kamitsuruma Junior High School, Kanagawa Prefectural Atsugi High School, and the University of Tokyo Faculty of Law. He joined the Ministry of International Trade and Industry (now the Ministry of Economy, Trade and Industry) in 1992. After serving on secondment to Stanford University and the Canadian Department of Foreign Affairs and International Trade, left the Ministry of Economy, Trade and Industry in July 2005.

== Political career ==
Gotō ran as the Democratic Party of Japan's (DPJ) official candidate in the October 2006 by-election for the House of Representatives' Kanagawa 16th District, following the death of incumbent Yoshiyuki Kamei, but he was defeated by Kamei's eldest son and former secretary, Zentaro Kamei.

In the 2009 Japanese general election, he ran again in Kanagawa's 16th district, defeating Zentaro Kamei to win his first seat.

In the 2012 Japanese general election, he ran as the official candidate of the DPJ, with the endorsement of the People's New Party, in Kanagawa's 16th district. Although he lost by a margin of approximately 8,000 votes to the Liberal Democratic Party's Hiroyuki Yoshiie, who had resigned from the House of Councillors to run in the election, he secured re-election through the proportional representation system (South Kanto block), where he was listed as a dual candidate. In the party leadership election held on 25 December, he nominated Sumio Mabuchi.

In May 2014, he joined the Jisei-kai, a group formed primarily by Goshi Hosono. In the 2014 Japanese general election, he defeated the Liberal Democratic Party's Hiroyuki Yoshiie in Kanagawa's 16th district by a margin of 1,489 votes, securing his third term.

Following the September 2017 Democratic Party leadership election, and the appointment of Acting Leader Yukio Edano and Election Campaign Committee Chair Akira Nagatsuma, both proponents of cooperation with the Japanese Communist Party, to the new executive team under leader Seiji Maehara, concerns were raised regarding whether Maehara (who had advocated reviewing that cooperation) could stick to the position he had maintained during the election; subsequently, reports emerged that a departure from the party was being considered. Taking responsibility for the turmoil caused by these reports, Goto submitted his resignation as head of the Kanagawa Prefectural Chapter on the evening of the 10th, and it was accepted at an extraordinary meeting of the chapter's executive committee on the evening of the 11th. Although he initially withheld a final decision after being urged to stay by Secretary-General Atsushi Oshima on the 12th, he announced his intention to leave the party on the 14th. He submitted his formal notice of withdrawal on the 15th, stating that the current Democratic Party could not serve as a viable alternative for voters and expressing a desire to aim for a new political force centered on centrist principles; he also showed interest in collaborating with Goshi Hosono, who had left the party in August. The Democratic Party refused to accept the notice of withdrawal, deeming his actions a "serious act against the party," and instead expelled him effective the 19th. While notices of withdrawal from lawmakers elected in single-seat constituencies had generally been accepted in the past, Oshima explained the disciplinary action by noting that the behavior disrupted party unity immediately after the leadership election, stating that "the gravity of the offense in undermining party strength is the same [regardless of whether the seat is proportional or single-seat]".

After leaving the party, he joined Hosono in forming a new party, as previously mentioned. He attended the press conference announcing the establishment of the Party of Hope on 27 September as one of the 14 founding lawmakers and subsequently assumed the role of official in charge of the party's platform. He failed to secure an endorsement from the trade union RENGO Kanagawa for the 2017 Japanese general election. Although defeated by the Liberal Democratic Party's Yoshiie in the Kanagawa 16th District, he secured a fourth term through the proportional representation system. Following the Party of Hope's co-leader election in November, he was appointed as the head of the Headquarters for the Promotion of Administrative Reform and Information Disclosure.

On 7 May 2018, he became the only founding member of the Party of Hope to join the Democratic Party for the People, which was formed through the merger of the Democratic Party and the Party of Hope. On 8 May, he assumed the role of Deputy Chairperson of the Policy Research Council for the Democratic Party for the People. On 11 September, he was promoted to Acting Chairperson of the Policy Research Council.

On 16 October 2019, assumed the position of Chairman of the Party's Energy Research Commission.

On 11 August 2020, in conjunction with the dissolution and re-merger of the former Democratic Party for the People and the former Constitutional Democratic Party of Japan, he announced his intention to join the new Constitutional Democratic Party of Japan.

In the 2021 Japanese general election, he defeated Yoshiie to secure a fifth term (Yoshiie was subsequently elected via the proportional representation list). During the leadership election held on 30 November, triggered by the resignation of party leader Yukio Edano, he served as a nominator for Kenta Izumi; following the election, under Izumi's leadership, he assumed the role of Chief of the Executive Office and joined the Executive Officers' Committee, albeit with non-voting status.

In the 2024 Japanese general election, he defeated Yoshiie by a wide margin to secure a sixth term.

Ahead of the 2026 Japanese general election, he joined the "Centrist Reform Alliance", (CRA) a new party formed by House of Representatives members from the Constitutional Democratic Party and Komeito; however, following the election—amidst a strong performance by the Liberal Democratic Party (LDP) and a poor result for the CRA—he was defeated by LDP candidate Masashi Sato but secured a seventh term via the proportional representation system.

On 31 August 2026, the three parties—the Centrist Reform Coalition, the Constitutional Democratic Party of Japan (CDP), and Komeito—abandoned plans to merge. On 9 September, the dissolution of the Centrist Reform Coalition was decided; with the exception of So Watanabe, all 48 members left the party, with Komeito-affiliated lawmakers returning to Komeito and CDP-affiliated lawmakers aiming to launch a new party. On September 16, the departure of the 48 members, including Goto, was approved. On 24 September 24, at a general meeting of lawmakers, the "Democratic Reform Party" confirmed the admission of all 18 CDP-affiliated members—excluding Kenta Izumi and Atsushi Oshima, who had previously announced they would not participate. Goto assumed the role of the party's Diet Affairs Committee Chair.

== Political positions ==
=== Relationship with the Citizens' Party ===
He ran as the official Democratic Party of Japan (DPJ) candidate in the October 2006 by-election for the House of Representatives (Kanagawa 16th District)—an election he ultimately lost—with support from "Shimin no To" (Citizens' Party), a political group that had become controversial due to its ties to the relatives of North Korean abduction perpetrators and its political donations to figures such as Naoto Kan. In his email newsletter, Goto explained: "It is true that I received support, such as having posters put up, without knowing at all what kind of organization it was", and added, "Since the House of Representatives by-election, I have completely severed all ties with Shimin no To".

=== Security legislation ===
On 28 May 2015, during a general Q&A session at the House of Representatives Special Committee on Security Legislation, Goto was discussing a scenario where the Strait of Hormuz is blockaded by mines—preventing oil tankers bound for Japan from passing and thereby threatening the nation's very survival—when he remarked, "In other words, I interpret this bill as defining that it is acceptable to wage war for the sake of oil. Is this a bill that enables war for the sake of oil?" Subsequently, a hoax originating on 2channel—falsely claiming Goto had said, "Oil is something that keeps you warm when you burn it! Don't you feel ashamed before the world to wage war over something like oil—which is merely good for keeping you warm when burned?!"—spread across platforms like Twitter, subjecting Goto to defamation and abuse.

=== North Korean missile launches ===
On 30 August 2017, during a meeting of the House of Representatives Committee on Security, a point was raised regarding the fact that Prime Minister Shinzo Abe had stayed at the Prime Minister's Official Residence for only two days throughout that month—and that on the day following each of those stays, North Korea had launched a missile—leading to speculation that the Prime Minister might be detecting the launches in advance. While acknowledging that "grasping the signs is a good thing," Goto remarked, "It’s glaringly obvious, isn't it?" and suggested, "I would recommend staying at the Official Residence a bit more often".
