= Shinji Tarutoko =

Japanese politician (born 1959)

- 樽床 伸二
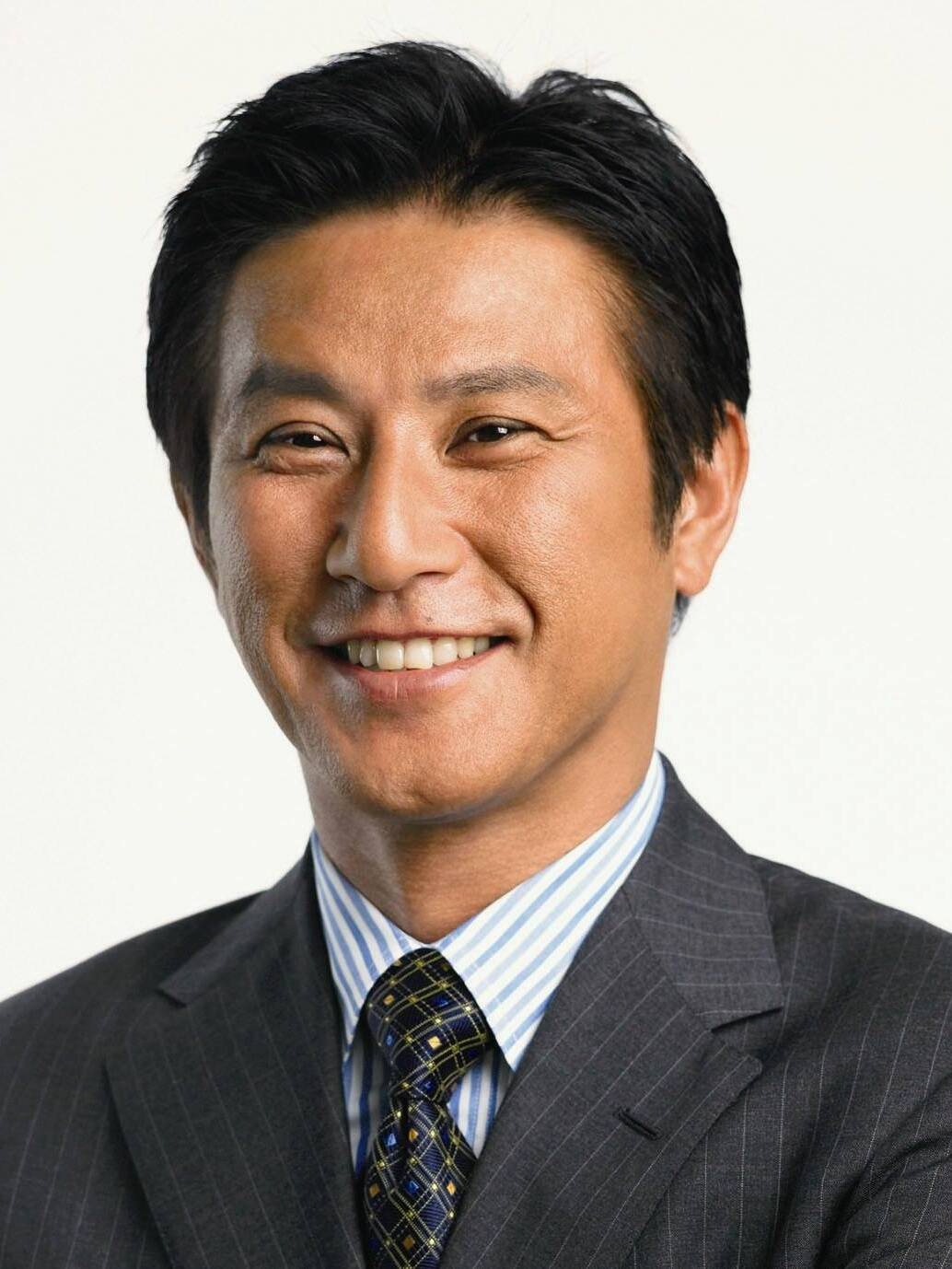
- Official portrait, 2012

Minister for Internal Affairs and Communications
- In office 1 October 2012 – 26 December 2012
- Prime Minister: Yoshihiko Noda
- Preceded by: Tatsuo Kawabata
- Succeeded by: Yoshitaka Shindō

Member of the House of Representatives
- In office 22 October 2017 – 28 January 2019
- Preceded by: Multi-member district
- Succeeded by: Sumio Mabuchi
- Constituency: Kinki PR
- In office 31 August 2009 – 16 November 2012
- Preceded by: Tomokatsu Kitagawa
- Succeeded by: Tomokatsu Kitagawa
- Constituency: Osaka 12th
- In office 19 July 1993 – 8 August 2005
- Preceded by: Ishimatsu Kitagawa
- Succeeded by: Tomokatsu Kitagawa
- Constituency: Osaka 7th (1993–1996); Osaka 12th (1996–2005)

Personal details
- Born: 6 August 1959 (age 67) Mitoya, Shimane, Japan
- Party: Independent (1990–1992; 2016–2017; 2018–present)
- Other political affiliations: JNP (1992–1994); NFP (1994–1997); From Five (1997–1998); GGP (1998); DPJ (1998–2016); DP (2016); KnT (2017–2018)
- Education: Osaka University
- Website: Official website

Shinji Tarutoko (樽床 伸二, Tarutoko Shinji; born 6 August 1959) is a Japanese politician and former member of the House of Representatives.

== Early life and education ==
Tarutoko was born in Shimane Prefecture on 6 August 1959. He studied at the Matsushita Institute of Government and Management.

== Career ==
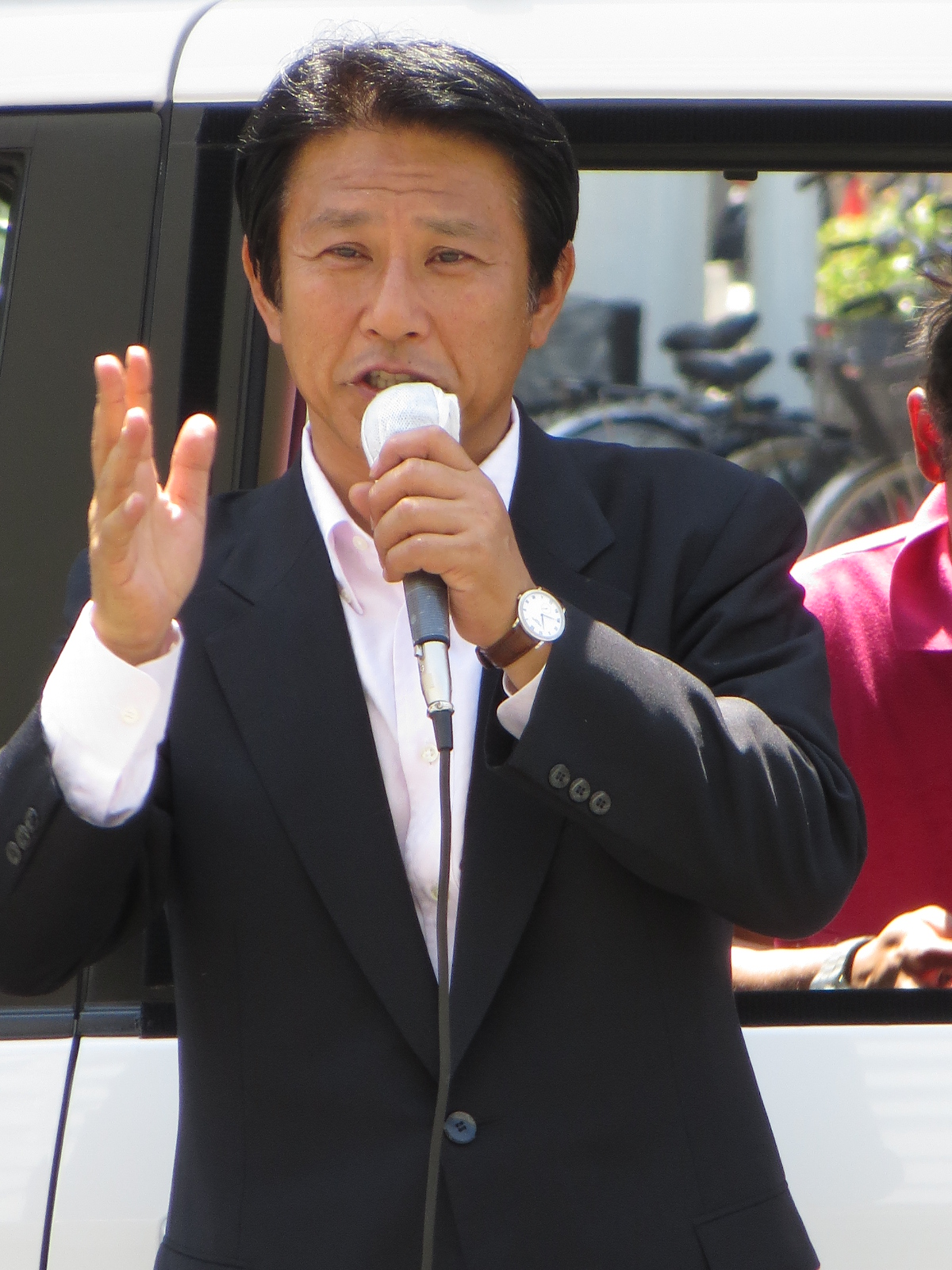
Tarutoko in 2013

Tarutoko was first elected to the House of Representatives in the 1993 election as a member of the defunct Japan New Party. Then he joined the Democratic Party of Japan in 1998.

In June 2010, he declared his intention to run against Naoto Kan for the leadership of the Democratic Party of Japan; had he won, he would have become the next Prime Minister of Japan. However, he was defeated on a 291–129 vote. He was appointed Minister of Internal Affairs and Communications by Prime Minister Yoshihiko Noda on 1 October 2012.

He lost his seat in the 16 December 2012 general election to Tomokatsu Kitagawa, who he had defeated in the 2009 election. Tarutoko challenged Kitagawa again in 2014, but failed. He became the top candidate on Kibō no Tō's Kinki proportional representation list in 2017 and was elected back to the House.

Tarutoko resigned his seat on 28 January 2019 to contest the Osaka 12th district by-election, which was called after Kitagawa's death.

House of Representatives (Japan)
Preceded by Masao Nakamura; Ishimatsu Kitagawa; Shigeaki Haruta	Member of the House of Representatives from Osaka 7th district (multi-member); 1993–1996; Served alongside: Yutaka Fukushima, Masao Nakamura	District eliminated
New district	Member of the House of Representatives from Osaka 12th district (single-member); 1996–2005	Succeeded by Tomokatsu Kitagawa
Preceded by Tomokatsu Kitagawa	Member of the House of Representatives from Osaka 12th district (single-member); 2009–2012	Succeeded by Tomokatsu Kitagawa
Preceded by 28-member district	Member of the House of Representatives from the Kinki proportional block 2017–2019	Succeeded by Sumio Mabuchi
Preceded by Kenichi Mizuno	Chairperson of the Committee on the Environment; 2009–2010	Succeeded by Yoshio Maki
Preceded by Akihiro Ohata	Chairperson of the Committee on Fundamental National Policies; 2010–2011	Succeeded by Keishu Tanaka
Political offices
Preceded by Tatsuo Kawabata	Minister for Internal Affairs and Communications; 2012	Succeeded by Yoshitaka Shindō
Party political offices
Preceded by Kenji Yamaoka	Chairman of the Democratic Party Diet Affairs Committee; 2010	Succeeded by Yoshio Hachiro
New office	Deputy Secretary General of the Democratic Party; 2011–2012	Succeeded by Jun Azumi
