= Osaka 12th district =

Japanese House of Representatives district

Ōsaka 12th district (大阪12区 Ōsaka jūni-ku) is a single-member electoral district for the House of Representatives, the lower house of the National Diet of Japan. It is located in North-eastern Osaka and covers the cities of Neyagawa, Daitō and Shijōnawate. As of September 2012, 342,226 voters were registered in this district, giving its voters a slight above average vote weight.

A representative from this district was LDP's Tomokatsu Kitagawa, the son of pre-reform three-member 7th district LDP Representative Ishimatsu Kitagawa. In 2012, he was one of only three Liberal Democrats in Osaka to win a district seat. He first won the seat in the "postal privatization" election of 2005. The first incumbent was Democrat Shinji Tarutoko who was elected to the House of Representatives in 1993 in the 7th district for the Japan New Party. After the electoral reform, he won the new single-member 12th district three times in a row before losing it to Kitagawa in 2005. In the landslide Democratic victory of 2009, Tarutoko regained the 12th district by a solid margin. He founded his own faction (Tarutoko group, officially: Seizankai) in 2010. Tarutoko ran for the DPJ presidency in 2010, became DPJ vice-secretary-general in 2011 and a minister of state in the Noda Cabinet in 2012. In 2012, he finished third behind Kitagawa and Your Party's Ryōma Ishii. Kitagawa died mid-term on 26 December 2018, triggering a by-election in April 2019. Kitagawa's nephew, Shinpei Kitagawa, ran in 2019 and 2021 but lost both times to Ishin candidate Fumitake Fujita.

== List of representatives ==
Representative	Party	Dates	Notes
Shinji Tarutoko	NFP	1996–2000	Joined Morihiro Hosokawa's From Five in the dissolution of the NFP, merged into Minseitō in 1998
Shinji Tarutoko	DPJ	2000–2005	Failed re-election in the Kinki PR block
Tomokatsu Kitagawa	LDP	2005–2009	Failed re-election in the Kinki PR block
Shinji Tarutoko	DPJ	2009–2012	Failed re-election in the Kinki PR block
Tomokatsu Kitagawa	LDP	2012–2018	Died in office
Vacant (December 2018–April 2019)
Fumitake Fujita	Ishin	2019 –	Co-Leader of Ishin 2025 –

== Recent election results ==
2026
Party	Candidate	Votes	%	±%
Ishin	Fumitake Fujita	88,775	50.2	▼2.2
LDP	Shinpei Kitagawa	38,167	21.6	▼12.2
Centrist Reform	Shinji Tarutoko	37,976	21.5	
JCP	Tooru Ohta	12,082	6.8	▼7.1
Registered electors		331,318		
Turnout			54.81	▲3.71
Ishin hold				

2024
Party	Candidate	Votes	%	±%
Ishin	Fumitake Fujita	86,380	52.35	▲1.15
LDP	Shinpei Kitagawa	55,658	33.73	▲1.44
JCP	Tooru Ohta	22,970	13.92	▲7.05
Turnout		165,008	51.10	▼3.90

2021
Party	Candidate	Votes	%	±%
Ishin	Fumitake Fujita	94,003	51.2	▲12.7
LDP	Shinpei Kitagawa	59,304	32.3	▲2.3
CDP	Yūko Utsunomiya	17,730	9.7	
JCP	Masanori Matsuo	12,614	6.9	
Turnout			55.0	▲8.0

2019 Osaka 12th district by-election
Party	Candidate	Votes	%	±%
Ishin	Fumitake Fujita	60,341	38.5	▼2.1
LDP	Shinpei Kitagawa	47,025	30.0	▼15.0
Independent	Shinji Tarutoko	35,358	22.6	
Independent	Takeshi Miyamoto	14,027	8.9	
Turnout			47.00	▼0.50

2017
Party	Candidate	Votes	%	±%
LDP	Tomokatsu Kitagawa	71,614	45.0	▲5.0
Ishin	Fumitake Fujita	64,530	40.6	
JCP	Masanori Matsuo	22,858	14.4	▲3.8
Turnout			47.5	▼4.4

2014
Party	Candidate	Votes	%	±%
LDP	Tomokatsu Kitagawa	68,817	40.0	▲0.1
Democratic	Shinji Tarutoko	43,265	25.2	
Ishin	Souichirō Katada	41,649	24.2	
JCP	Yoshiko Yoshii	18,257	10.6	▲1.8
Turnout			51.9	

2012
Party	Candidate	Votes	%	±%
LDP – Kōmeitō	Tomokatsu Kitagawa	76,972	39.9	▲3.8
YP – JRP	Ryōma Ishii	49,750	25.8	new
DPJ – PNP	Shinji Tarutoko	49,153	25.5	−27.7
JCP	Yoshiko Yoshii	49,153	8.8	new

2009
Party	Candidate	Votes	%	±%
DPJ – PNP	Shinji Tarutoko	119,084	53.2	
LDP – Kōmeitō	Tomokatsu Kitagawa	80,847	36.1	
JCP	Hatsue Shigeta	19,053	8.5	
HRP	Mami Miyazaki	4,894	2.2	
Turnout		227,536	66.61	

2005
Party	Candidate	Votes	%	±%
LDP	Tomokatsu Kitagawa	108,903	49.6	
DPJ	Shinji Tarutoko	87,091	39.7	
JCP	Kumiko Ōta	23,595	10.7	

2003
Party	Candidate	Votes	%	±%
DPJ	Shinji Tarutoko	82,190	44.6	
LDP	Tomokatsu Kitagawa (elected by PR)	81,270	44.1	
JCP	Yōichi Nishimori	21,023	11.4	
Turnout		189,056	54.81	
