= Tomokatsu Kitagawa =

Japanese politician (1951–2018)

- 北川 知克
- Official portrait, 2013

Member of the House of Representatives
- In office 17 December 2012 – 26 December 2018
- Preceded by: Shinji Tarutoko
- Succeeded by: Fumitake Fujita
- Constituency: Osaka 12th
- In office 16 July 2003 – 21 July 2009
- Preceded by: Tōru Okutani
- Succeeded by: Shinji Tarutoko
- Constituency: Kinki PR (2003–2005); Osaka 12th (2005–2009)

Personal details
- Born: 8 November 1951 Neyagawa, Osaka, Japan
- Died: 26 December 2018 (aged 67) Suita, Osaka, Japan
- Party: Liberal Democratic
- Parent: Ishimatsu Kitagawa (father)
- Education: Kansai University

Tomokatsu Kitagawa (北川 知克, Kitagawa Tomokatsu; 8 November 1951 – 26 December 2018) was a Japanese politician from the Liberal Democratic Party, and a member of the House of Representatives in the Diet (national legislature).

== Early life ==
Kitagawa was a native of Neyagawa, Osaka and graduated from Kansai University.

== Political career ==
Kitagawa ran unsuccessfully for the House of Representatives in 2000.

He became a member in July 2003 as proportional replacement from the LDP list in Kinki for deceased Tōru Okutani, in the November 2003 election he was elected for the first time.

He ran for re-election in 2009 and was defeated by Shinji Tarutoko of the Democratic Party.

Kitagawa recaptured his seat in the 2012 election and held it until his death from peritonitis on 26 December 2018.

House of Representatives (Japan)
Preceded by Shinji Tarutoko	Member of the House of Representatives from Osaka 12th district 2005–2009; 2012–2018	Succeeded by Shinji Tarutoko
Preceded by Shinji Tarutoko	Member of the House of Representatives from Osaka 12th district 2005–2009; 2012–2018	Succeeded by Fumitake Fujita
Vacant Title last held by Tōru Okutani	Member of the House of Representatives from Kinki proportional LDP list July–November 2003; 2003–2005	Succeeded by N/A
Preceded by N/A	Member of the House of Representatives from Kinki proportional LDP list July–November 2003; 2003–2005	Succeeded by N/A
