= Zentaro Kamei =

Japanese politician

- 亀井 善太郎

Member of the House of Representatives
- In office 22 October 2006 – 21 July 2009
- Preceded by: Yoshiyuki Kamei
- Succeeded by: Yūichi Gotō
- Constituency: Kanagawa 16th

Personal details
- Born: 20 January 1971 (age 55) Isehara, Kanagawa, Japan
- Party: Liberal Democratic
- Parent: Yoshiyuki Kamei (father)
- Education: Keio University

Zentaro Kamei (亀井 善太郎, Kamei Zentarō; born January 20, 1971) is a Japanese politician of the Liberal Democratic Party, a member of the House of Representatives in the Diet (national legislature). A native of Isehara, Kanagawa and graduate of Keio University, he was elected for the first time in 2006. In the 45th House of Representatives general election held on August 30, 2009, he ran unsuccessfully for re-election as a candidate endorsed by the Liberal Democratic Party.

Prior to be in politics, he worked for Industrial Bank of Japan and Boston Consulting Group.

He is the son of the late Japanese politician Yoshiyuki Kamei, who was Minister of Agriculture, Forestry and Fisheries during the government of Junichiro Koizumi and Minister of Transport during the government of Ryutaro Hashimoto.

In April 2026 he was appointed as a professor at the National Graduate Institute for Policy Studies, a National University led by Hiroko Ota, formerly a minister in the government of Shinzo Abe.
