= Democratic Reform Party (Japan, 2026) =

Democratic Reform Party 民主改革の会 Minshu Kaikaku no Kai
- Leader: Junya Ogawa
- Secretary-General: Takeshi Shina
- Founded: 17 September 2026
- Split from: Centrist Reform Alliance
- Preceded by: Constitutional Democratic Party
- Representatives: 18 / 465

The Democratic Reform Party (Japanese: 民主改革の会, Hepburn: Minshu Kaikaku no Kai; lit. Democratic Reform Association) is a Japanese political party. The party was formed by former Constitutional Democratic Party members after the dissolution of the Centrist Reform Alliance (CRA).

== History ==
Upon its official announcement on 16 September 2026, the Democratic Reform Party adopted the CRA's platform. The CRA's former leadership team, with Junya Ogawa as leader and Takeshi Shina as Secretary-General, will head the new party. The party submitted the notification to establish the new party with the Minister for Internal Affairs and Communications on 17 September, five representatives joined initially, with a goal of all 20 CDP-aligned CRA members eventually joining. However, two representatives stated they would not join the party: former CDP leader Kenta Izumi, and former acting Kibō no Tō leader Atsushi Oshima. Izumi further said he would not join the joint caucus of the Democratic Reform Party and Komeito, and would instead be an independent.

On 18 September they had 5 members, and when the party became active on 24 September they had 18 members. At their first meeting, Yūichi Gotō was chosen as National Diet affairs chief, and Takayuki Ochiai was chosen as policy head. The party formed a unified parliamentary group with Komeito named Centrists (中道, Chūdō; lit. Middle Way).

== List of members ==
Member
Kaname Tajima
Akira Nagatsuma
Chinami Nishimura
Yoshihiko Noda
Hirofumi Ryu
Junya Ogawa
Makiko Kikuta
Takeshi Shina
Emi Kaneko
Yoshifu Arita
Takeshi Noma
Hiroshi Kamiya
Takayuki Ochiai
Kazuhiko Shigetoku
Kazuya Kondo
Yuki Waseda
Tatsumaru Yamaoka
Yūichi Gotō
