= Takeshi Miyamoto =

Japanese politician

- 宮本 岳志
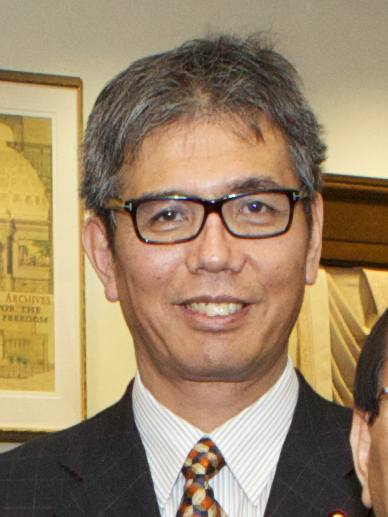
- Miyamoto in 2014

Member of the House of Representatives
- In office 5 November 2021 – 9 October 2024
- Constituency: Kinki PR
- In office 31 August 2009 – 9 April 2019
- Preceded by: Multi-member district
- Succeeded by: Tadashi Shimizu
- Constituency: Kinki PR

Member of the House of Councillors
- In office 26 July 1998 – 25 July 2004
- Preceded by: Kazutaka Tsuboi
- Succeeded by: Motoyuki Odachi
- Constituency: Osaka at-large

Personal details
- Born: 25 December 1959 (age 66) Wakayama City, Wakayama, Japan
- Party: Communist
- Education: Wakayama University (expelled)

Takeshi Miyamoto (宮本 岳志, Miyamoto Takeshi) is a member of the Japanese Communist Party who served in the House of Representatives. He is opposed to the policy that increases competitive research funds while cutting grants to post-secondary educational institutions, saying that the policy has forced some institutions to hire retired government officials.
