= Daff (disambiguation) =

J. A. "Daff" Gammons was an American football player and coach.

Daff may also refer to:

- Al Daff (1902–1991), Australian film executive
- Lily Attey Daff (1885–1945), New Zealand artist
- Daff Dome
- Daff, a Persian frame drum

DAFF may refer to:

- Danish American Football Federation
- Department of Agriculture, Fisheries and Forestry (disambiguation)
- Department of Agriculture, Forestry and Fisheries (South Africa)

DAfF may refer to:

- Deutsche Akademie für Fernsehen (German Television Academy)
