= 2024 Liberal Democratic Party presidential election =

Japanese political leadership election

- 27 September 2024
- Registered: 1,055,839 (▼4.39%)
- Turnout: 698,545 · 66.16% (▼2.84 pp)
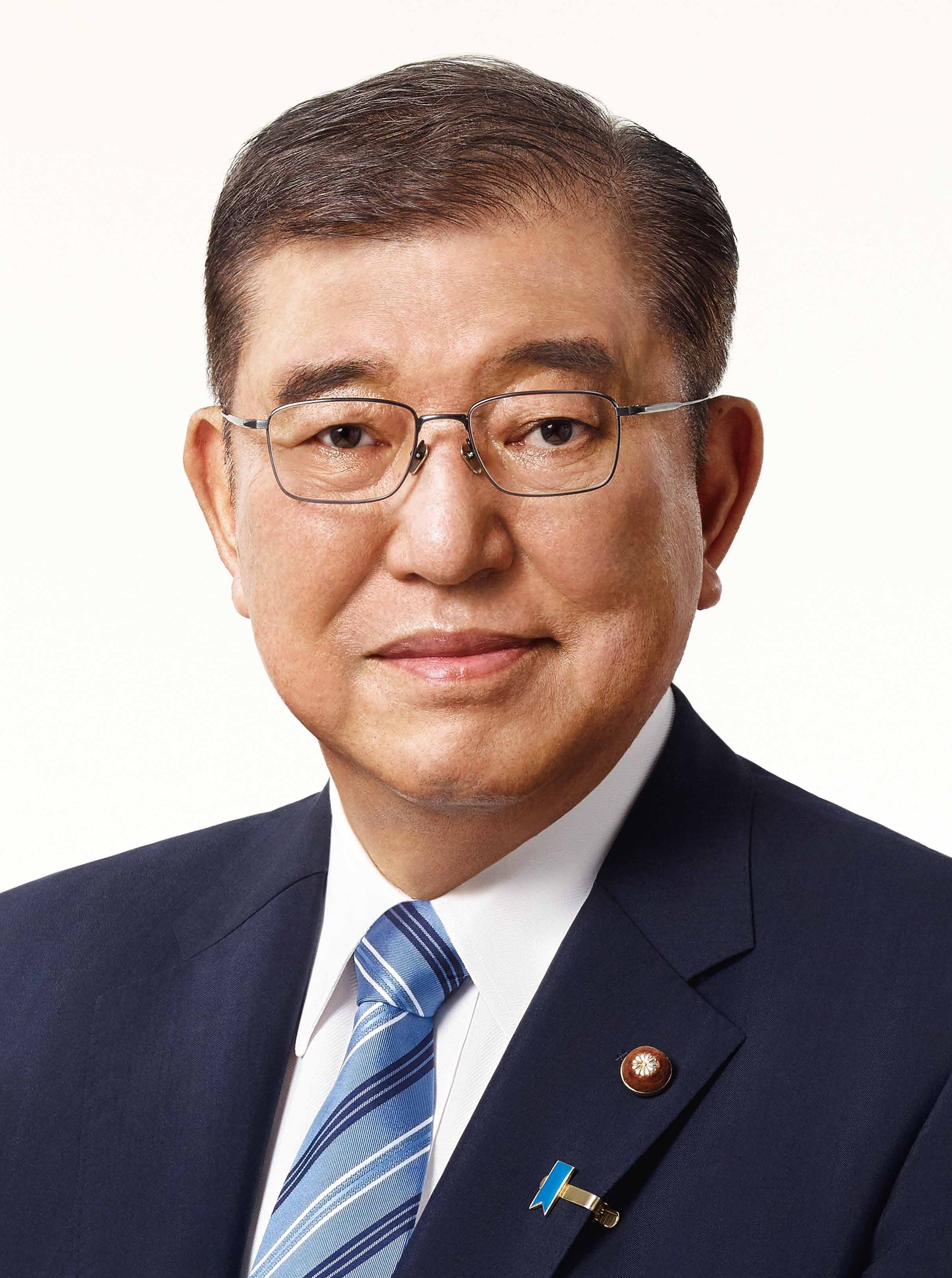

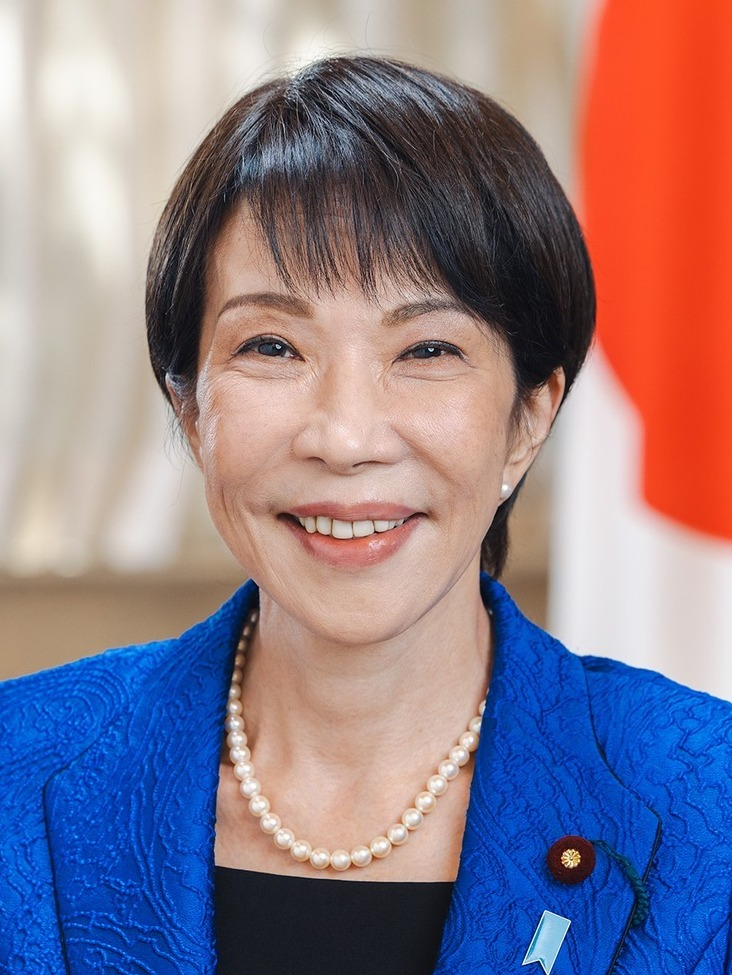

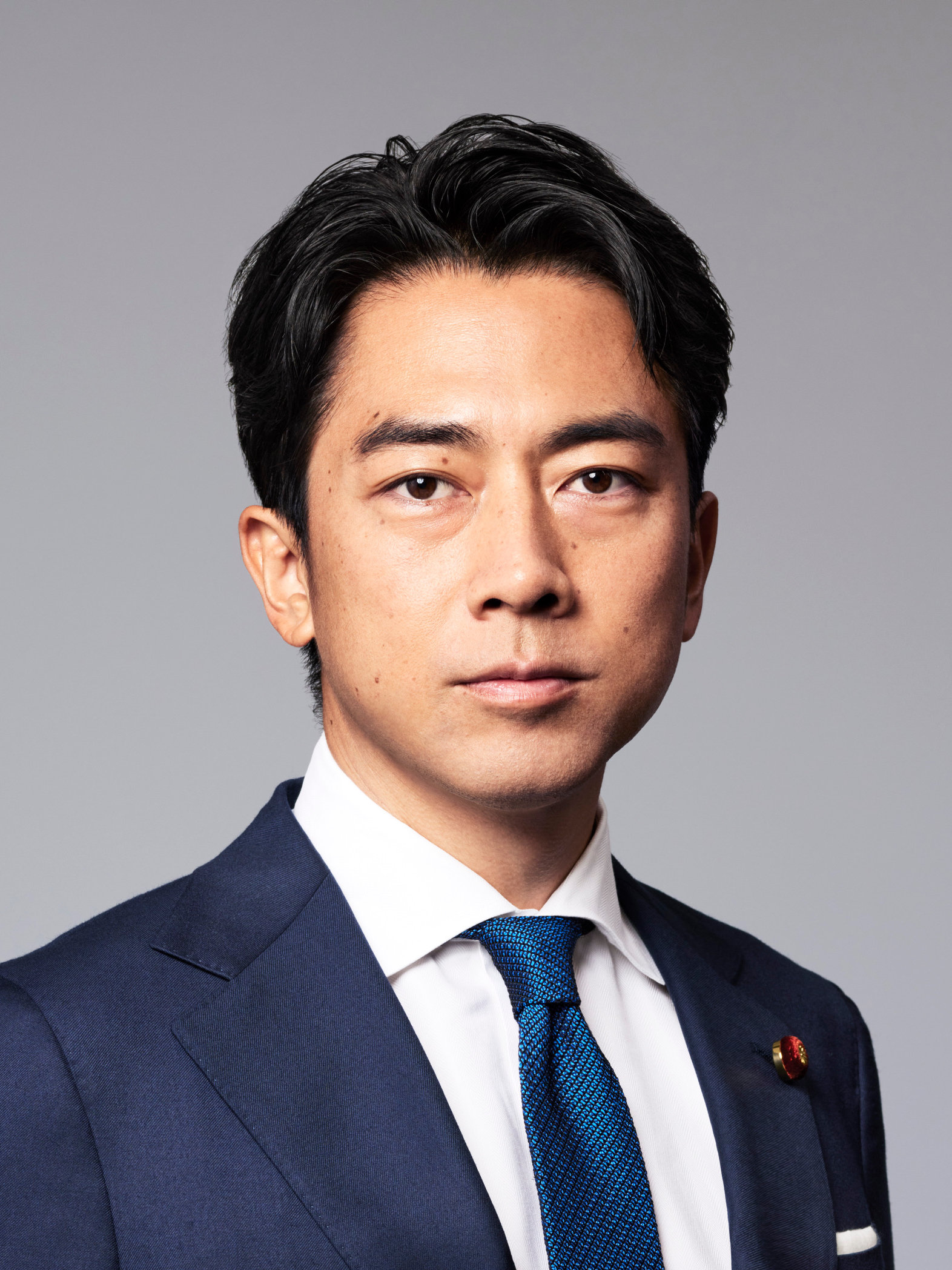
Candidate	Shigeru Ishiba	Sanae Takaichi	Shinjirō Koizumi
Leader's seat	Tottori 1st	Nara 2nd	Kanagawa 11th
First round	154 (20.95%)	181 (24.63%)	136 (18.50%)
Runoff vote	215 (52.57%)	194 (47.43%)	Eliminated
President before election
Fumio Kishida
Elected President
Shigeru Ishiba

The 2024 Liberal Democratic Party presidential election was held on 27 September 2024 to elect the next president of the Liberal Democratic Party of Japan for a three-year term.

Incumbent LDP President and Prime Minister Fumio Kishida announced on 14 August that he would not run for his re-election, amid record-low approval ratings following controversy over a slush fund scandal involving the party factions Seiwakai and Shisuikai, both of which disbanded in January 2024. Kishida's Kōchikai also disbanded. Approval ratings were also mired by the party's affiliations with the Unification Church.

The 2024 presidential election was the first since the abolition of most of the party's factions in the wake of the slush fund scandal, which led to commentators describing the election's outcome as unusually volatile and unpredictable. Nine candidates ran for the presidency, a record number. At the beginning of the official campaign period, Former Minister of Defense Shigeru Ishiba, former Minister of the Environment Shinjirō Koizumi and Minister of State for Economic Security Sanae Takaichi emerged as the three top front-runners based on polling. Ishiba and Koizumi were described as the "centrists" of the election, while Takaichi was described as a "staunch conservative."

Ishiba narrowly defeated Takaichi in a runoff, and was confirmed by the Diet as the next Prime Minister four days later on 1 October. Ishiba's victory was described by commentators as unexpected and an upset, owing to his past leadership bid failures as well as his prior unpopularity with many LDP members of the Diet.

== Election procedure ==
The election process for the President of the LDP is established in the "Rules for the Election of President of the Party". In order to officially qualify as a candidate in the election, a candidate must be an LDP member of the National Diet and must receive a nomination from at least 20 fellow LDP Diet members.

The LDP selects its leader via a two-round election involving both LDP members of the Diet and dues-paying party members from across Japan. In the first round, all LDP members of the Diet cast one vote while party member votes are translated proportionally into votes equaling the other half of the total ballots. If any candidate wins a majority (over 50%) of votes in the first round, that candidate is elected president.

As no candidate received a majority of votes in the first round, a runoff was held immediately between the top two candidates, Shigeru Ishiba and Sanae Takaichi. In a runoff, all Diet members vote again while the 47 prefectural chapters of the LDP get one vote each, with the result of the latter votes determined using the first round results of party members in each prefecture. The candidate who wins the most votes in the runoff is then elected president. Ishiba received 215 votes to Takaichi's 194, securing Ishiba the spot as the next leader of the LDP.

=== Organization ===
On 26 July, the party announced the members of the Presidential Election Commission, which was chaired by Ichiro Aisawa. Unlike in the 2021 election, the committee selection was based on constituencies as opposed to factions. Mainichi reported that some within the LDP claimed that outgoing party president Fumio Kishida deliberately selected Diet members who supported Sanae Takaichi in 2021 in order to deprive her of endorsements necessary to stand in the election.

LDP Presidential Election Management Committee
Position	Portrait	Member of the Diet
Chairman		Ichiro Aisawa
Deputy Chair		Gen Nakatani
Members		Masahiro Imamura
Members		Ichiro Miyashita
Members		Hideki Niwa
Members		Shinsuke Okuno
Members		Hitoshi Kikawada
Members		Yuko Nakagawa
Members		Tetsuro Nomura
Members		Satsuki Katayama
Members		Ken Akamatsu

== Background ==
Following the resignation of party president and prime minister Yoshihide Suga, former foreign minister Fumio Kishida was elected President of the LDP in 2021, defeating Administrative Reform and Regulatory Reform minister Taro Kono in a second round runoff, becoming the prime minister on 4 October 2021.

=== Assassination of Shinzo Abe and ties to the Unification Church ===
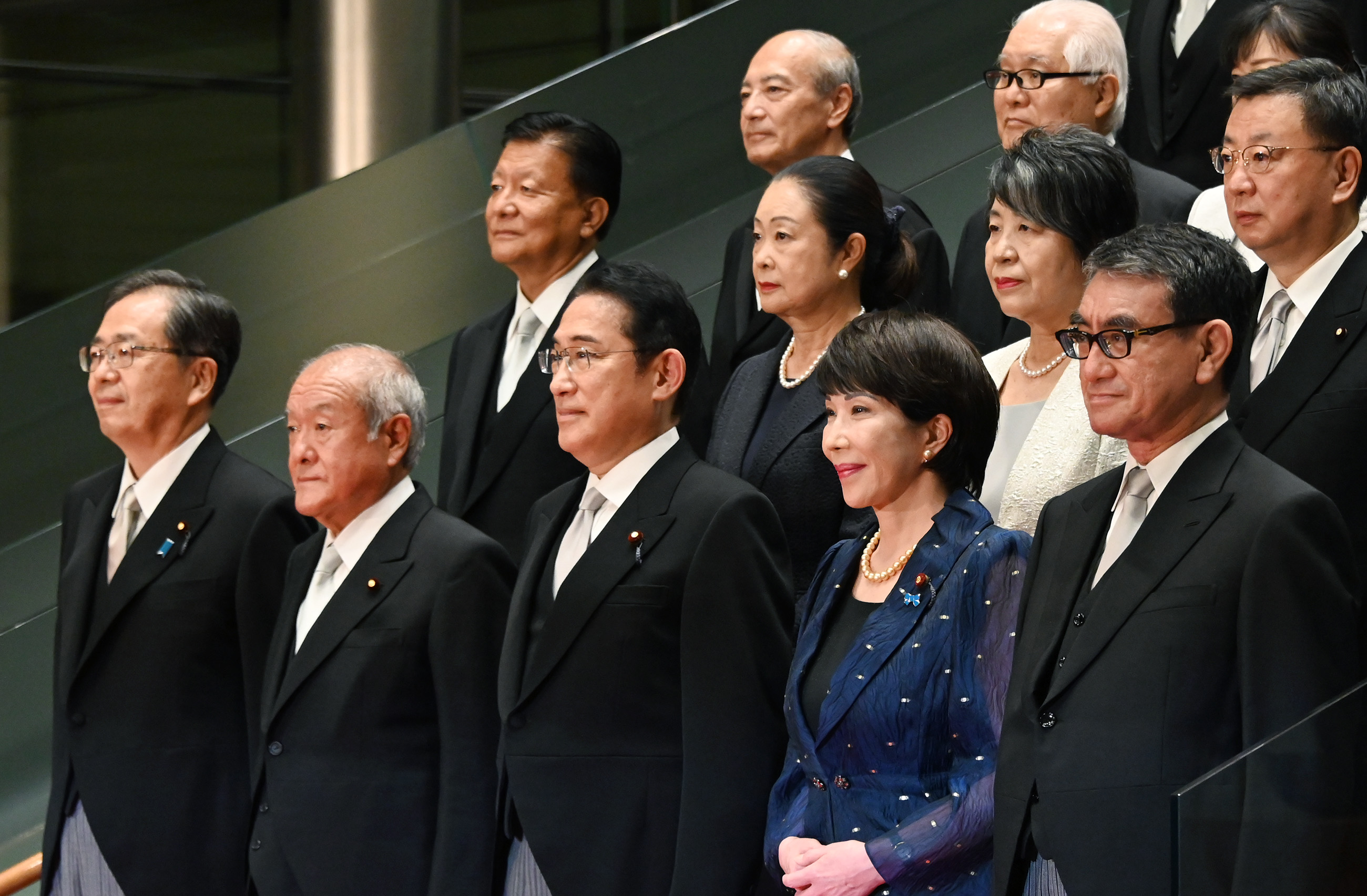
Prime Minister Fumio Kishida reshuffled his second cabinet in 2023 to include more women and keep potential political rivals in key roles.

Following the assassination of former prime minister Shinzo Abe in 2022, the Unification Church (UC) new religious movement was shown to have significant political influence in the LDP, and the popularity for the party, as well as Kishida's approval rating, decreased. Kishida reshuffled his cabinet on 10 August 2022 in an effort to remove cabinet ministers associated with the UC in order to regain public trust in his government.

Kishida reshuffled his cabinet once again on 13 September 2023 as his premiership continued to lose public support. The reshuffle was highlighted for its comparatively high proportion of women in official roles and the inclusion of members of opposing factions in high-ranking roles such as Taro Kono and Toshimitsu Motegi.

=== Slush fund scandal ===
In November 2023, it was discovered that members of the conservative Seiwa Seisaku Kenkyūkai (Seiwakai) and Shisuikai factions failed to report over JP¥600 million (US$4.06 million) in campaign funds, which they had instead placed in unlawful slush funds. This led to a scandal concerning the misuse of campaign funds by these members.

Amidst the escalating scandal, Kishida declared on 13 December 2023 that he was dismissing Chief Cabinet Secretary Hirokazu Matsuno, Minister of Economy, Trade and Industry Yasutoshi Nishimura, Minister of Internal Affairs and Communications Junji Suzuki, and Minister of Agriculture, Forestry, and Fisheries Ichiro Miyashita. Hiroyuki Miyazawa, the deputy minister of defense, was also removed from office. All the expelled officials belonged to the Seiwakai faction. The opposition Constitutional Democratic Party submitted a vote of no confidence against Matsuno and the entirety of Kishida's cabinet as a result of the scandal. Although both motions failed due to the LDP's majority in the National Diet, it was the closest no confidence vote in decades due to the rare unity between Japan's opposition parties in voting in favor of the vote.

The first arrests took place on 7 January 2024, with former deputy minister of education Yoshitaki Ikeda and Kazuhiro Kakinuma, his assistant, being accused of concealing ¥48 million that the Seiwakai earned between 2018 and 2022. The National Police Agency justified their arrest by claiming that there was a chance of evidence destruction. Ikeda was expelled from the LDP after details of the arrests were made public.

On 7 December 2023, Kishida announced his resignation as leader of the moderate Kōchikai faction, which he led since 2012 and announced he will leave the faction due to the scandal. A month later in January 2024, Kōchikai, along with Seiwakai and Shisuikai were dissolved, leaving Motegi's Heisei Kenkyūkai and Tarō Asō's Shikōkai as the only remaining factions left in the party.

Kishida Cabinet approval ratings since 2021.

=== Continued unpopularity and resignation ===
Kishida's approval ratings continued to fall in the aftermath of the scandal, dropping to 23% on 13 December 2023, marking the lowest rating for any Prime Minister since the LDP's return to power in 2012. By 22 December, his approval ratings had further decreased to 17%. According to a Mainichi Shimbun poll conducted on 18 December 2023, 79% of respondents disapprove of Kishida's performance as Prime Minister, the highest disapproval rate since the end of World War II.

Concerns emerged about Kishida's ability to lead the party to victory in the upcoming general election, with the scandal leading to speculations that the LDP could potentially lose power in favor of a CDP-led coalition. Ex-Seiwakai member and House of Representatives member Takatori Shuichi said that he does not believe the party can maintain a majority in the National Diet if Kishida is reelected as party president, while Kishida's predecessor Suga on 23 June called for the resignation of Kishida, stating that the party would lose power if "things continue like this". Mainichi Shimbun reports that the party could split between pro-Kishida and anti-Kishida forces ahead of the election, with some supporting Suga's criticism of Kishida.

== Campaign ==
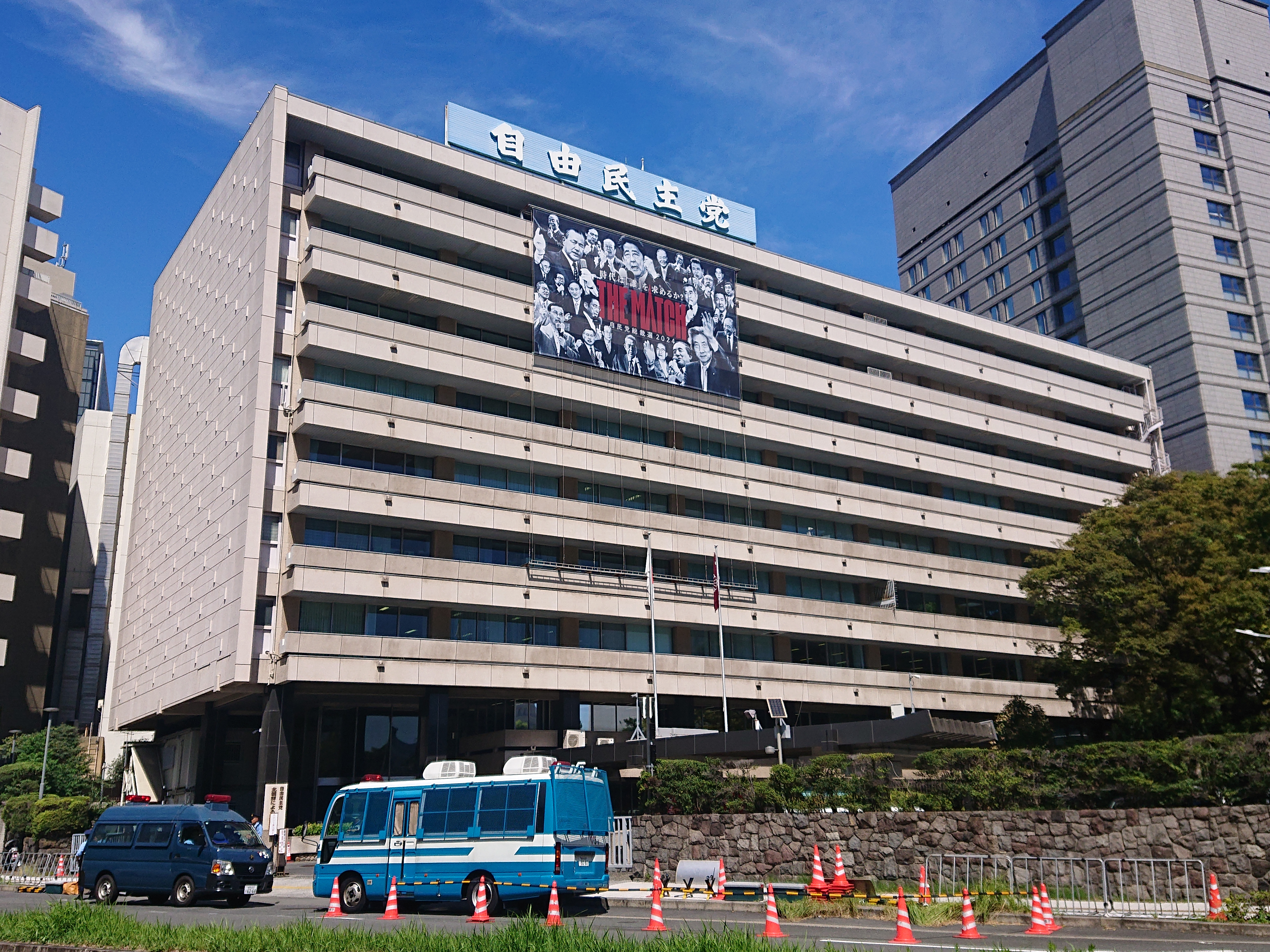
Liberal Democratic Party headquarters during the 2024 presidential election.

=== Prelude ===
Sanae Takaichi on 18 June 2024 announced that she will be publishing a book on economic security titled "Japan's Economic Security" (日本の経済安全保障), to be published on 8 July, the second anniversary of Shinzo Abe's assassination. There are views within the party that the book is an early campaign manifesto for her presidential run. On 30 June, the Asahi Shimbun reported that Sanae Takaichi had decided to run for the presidential election. She denied this in a post on Twitter, and later declined to comment on 2 July.

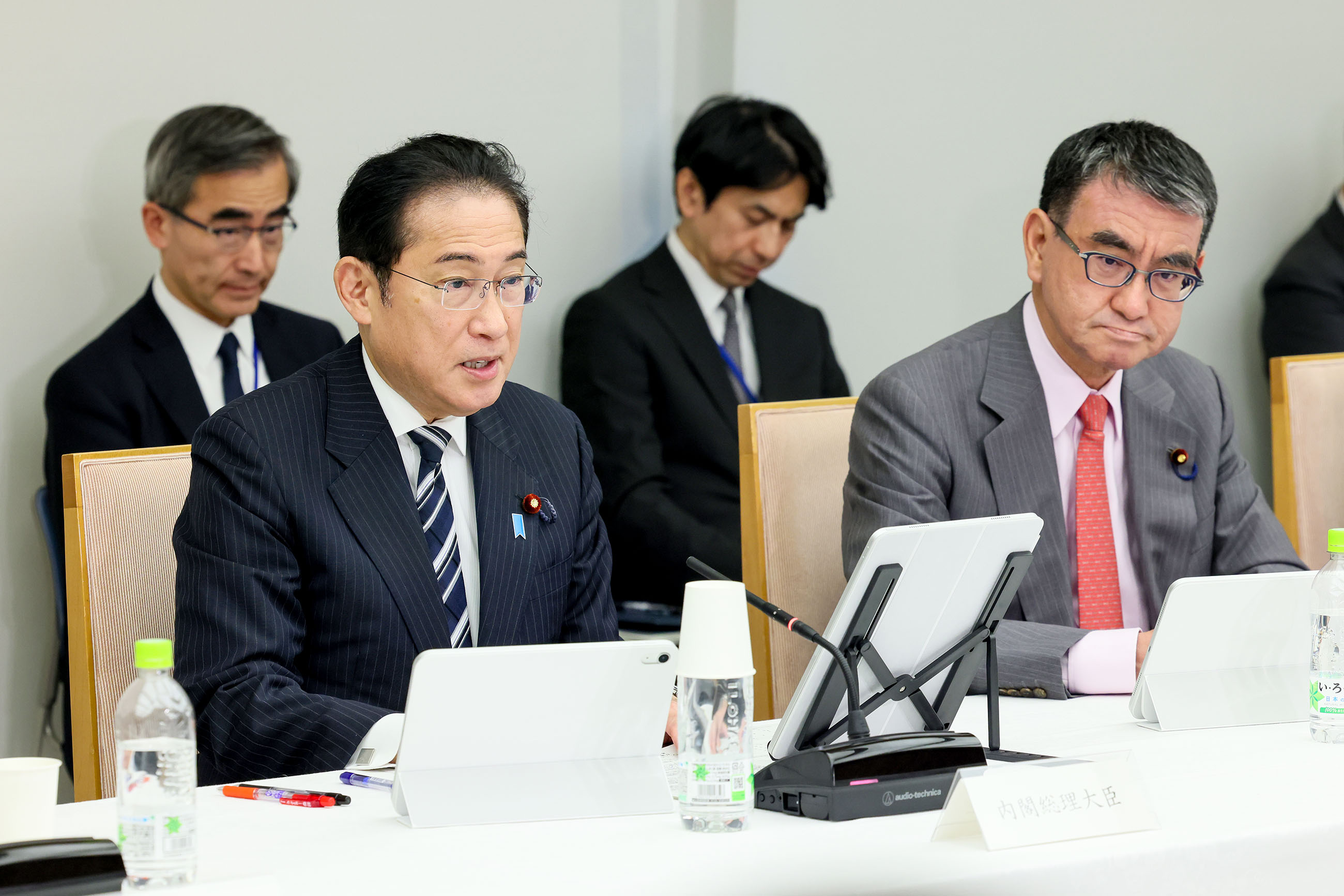
Fumio Kishida and Taro Kono in June 2024.

On 26 June, Taro Kono, who made it to the second round in 2021, conveyed his desire to run for the presidency to LDP Vice President and his faction boss Taro Aso, during dinner. Governor of Gunma Ichita Yamamoto announced his intentions to endorse Kono in a press conference the following day. On 10 August, Kono again conveyed his desire to run to Taro Aso. He reportedly told Aso he would run with or without his support.

Shigeru Ishiba on 28 June informed his political allies of his intentions to run for the presidency and has begun making "concrete arrangements". He indicated on 11 July that he would make a decision by August. Later on 21 July Ishiba said he would decide around the Obon holiday period (August 13–16). Two days later he said that were he to run, he would campaign on deleting the second paragraph of Article 9 in the Japanese Constitution renouncing Japan's right to wage war. Ishiba declared his candidacy on 14 August, hours after Kishida's resignation.

On 2 July the Yukan Fuji reported that Shinjirō Koizumi may be preparing to run for LDP president, with a goal of making it to the second round runoff. While visiting Fukushima Prefecture for a surfing competition, Koizumi said he was "carefully considering" a run for the party presidency. Diet Member Naoki Furukawa suggested Kishida be replaced by Koizumi on 12 July.

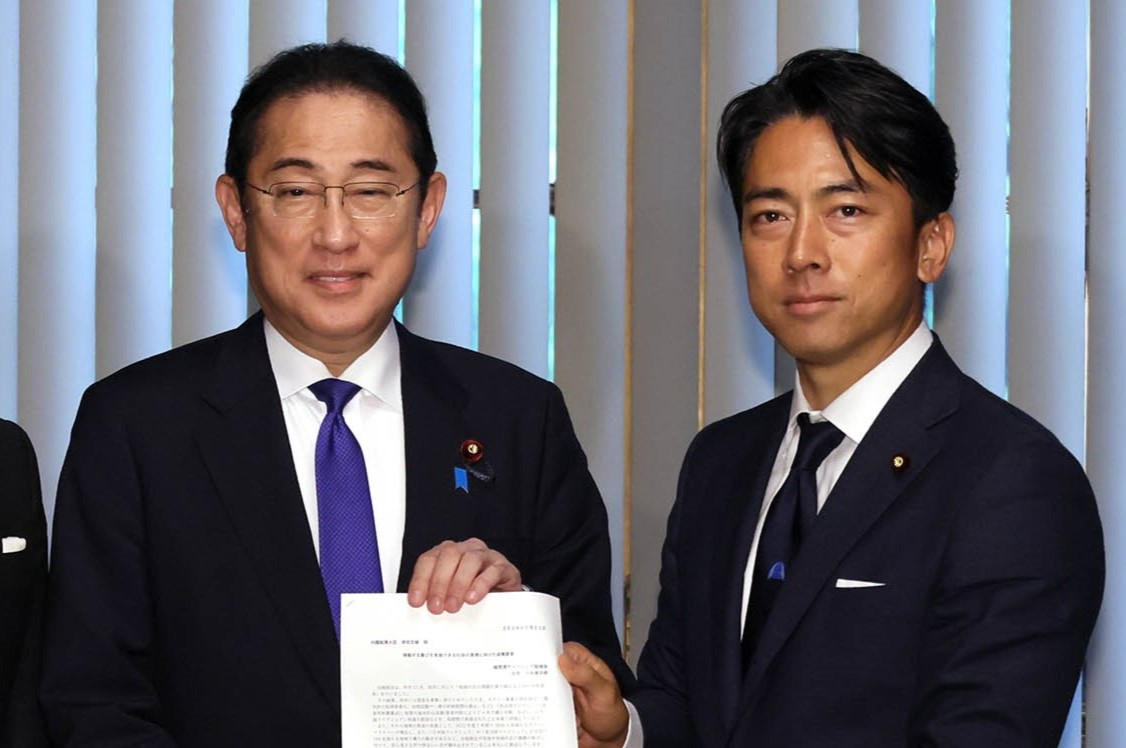
Fumio Kishida and Shinjiro Koizumi in May 2024.

LDP Secretary-General Toshimitsu Motegi visited Fumio Kishida's home prefecture of Hiroshima on 6 July. Motegi later said on 22 July that he would not be the first candidate to formally declare his intention to run, in order to avoid becoming the "Reiwa era Nobuteru Ishihara" who ran in the 2012 election. On the same day, he stated he would make a decision by early September. Motegi will embark on a trip to Indonesia, Singapore, Thailand, and the Philippines on 28 July in an effort to boost his profile.

On 24 July Seiko Noda met with policy chief Tokai Kisaburo, Diet Affairs Chair Hamada Yasukazu (both of whom endorsed her campaign in 2021) and others to discuss her potential candidacy.

Takayuki Kobayashi indicated on 12 August that the party should "balance out" punishments against Abe faction members for the kickback scandal, arguing that removal from leadership has made on the ground activities challenging. LDP Upper House Member Shigeharu Aoyama indicated in a press conference that he would run for the Presidency. The same day Diet members Tatsuo Fukuda, Masanobu Ogura and Keitaro Ohno stated in an opinion piece that the election was "a big opportunity for a change in generation and appointing women", seemingly calling for Kishida to step aside.

=== Kishida declines and early campaign activities ===
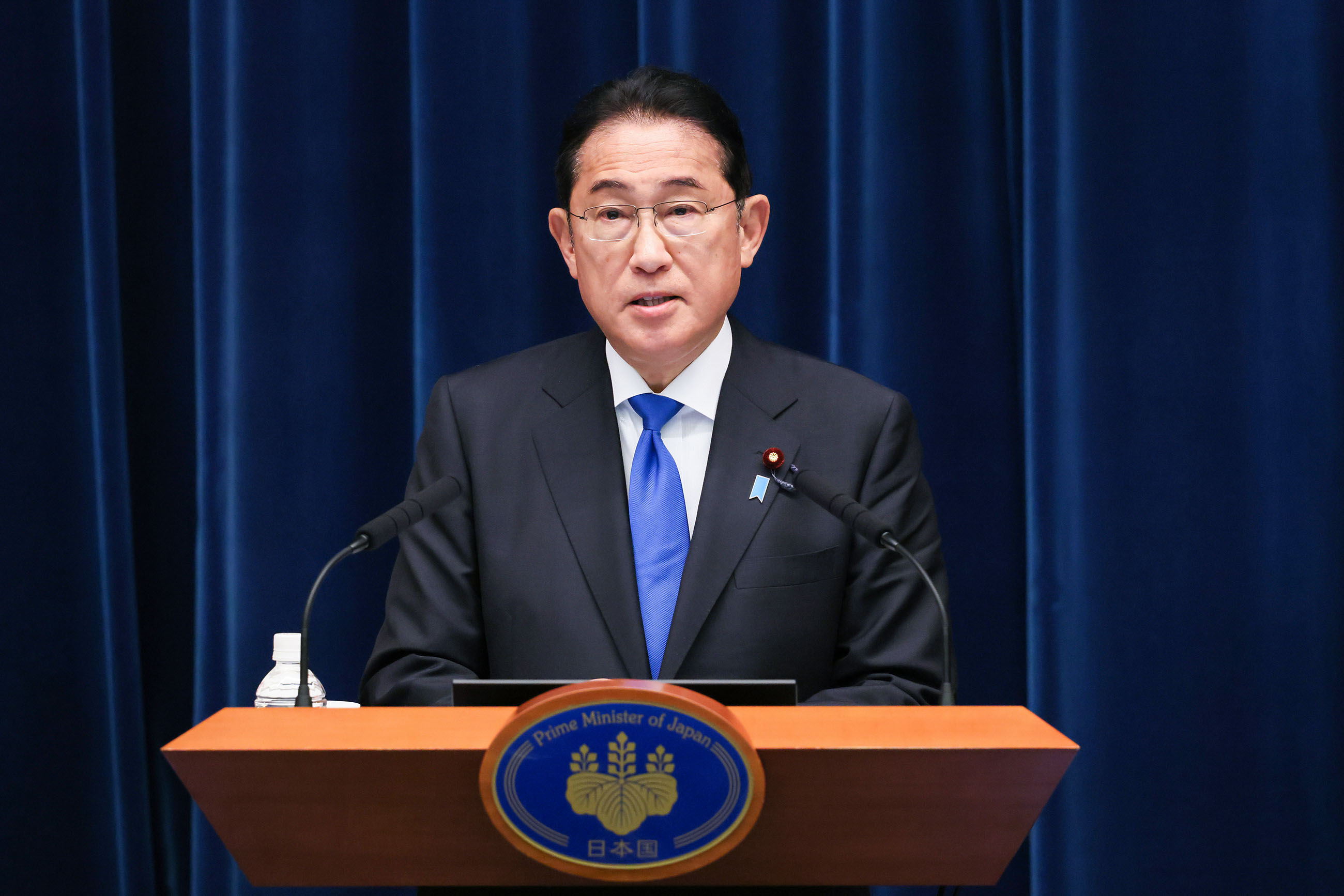
Kishida announcing that he will not seek re-election as President of the party, 14 August 2024

On 14 August, Fumio Kishida announced that he would not seek a second term as President of the Liberal Democratic Party. This effectively made the race an "open field" for new candidates. Kishida was reportedly pressured by influential members of the party, such as Taro Aso, Masahito Moriyama and Yoshimasa Hayashi to not seek a second term. The announcement reportedly unsettled Japanese markets, which were already disturbed by a surprise rate increase by the Bank of Japan in late July. At a press conference at the Prime Minister's Office on the same day, Kishida stated resigning was the "easiest way to clearly show that the LDP has changed". He also cited the slush funds scandal as a reason for stepping aside, believing it was the only way to take "responsibility" as party leader for losing trust from the public. He pledged to support whoever will be chosen by the party as a rank-and-file member, refusing to endorse a particular candidate, adding that he was withdrawing so that the party could have an "open contest to promote debate". Kishida's more than 1,000 days in power made him Japan's eighth longest-serving post-war prime minister.

Kishida's decision to not seek a second term made the leadership election "especially chaotic". Immediately after Kishida's announcement, several potential candidates were mentioned, among them being Taro Kono, Shigeru Ishiba, Toshimitsu Motegi, Sanae Takaichi and Shinjiro Koizumi. Seiko Noda, Katsunobu Kato and Yoko Kamikawa were also considered potential contenders.

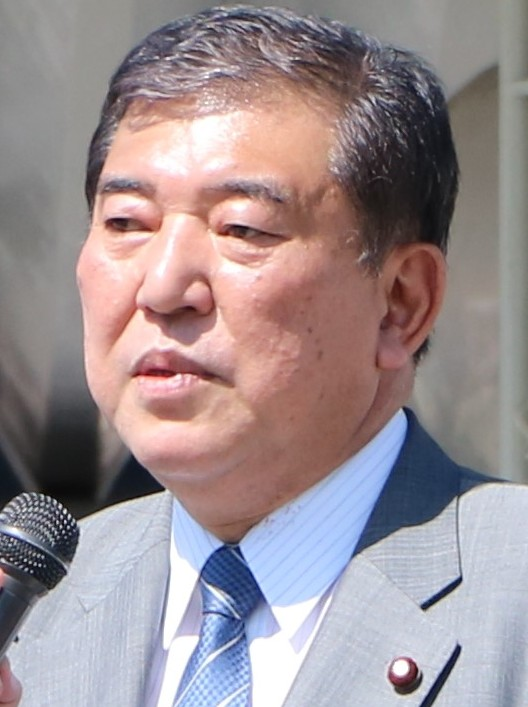
Prior to Kishida's decision to opt out of re-election, Shigeru Ishiba expressed interest in running for the LDP presidency and led in several polls

The night after the press conference, Toshimitsu Motegi met with Taro Aso, who said it would be difficult to support him. Early after Kishida's announcement, it was reported that it was unlikely he would back Motegi. The day after his announcement on 15 August, Kishida informed his cabinet ministers that they may start campaigning for LDP President as long as it doesn't affect their duties as ministers. That same day, Shinjiro Koizumi and Takayuki Kobayashi visited the Yasukuni Shrine on the 79th anniversary of Japan's surrender in World War II. Economy, Trade and Industry Minister Ken Saito also said he was interested in running, after previously backing Kishida. Potential candidate Yukio Obuchi stated that she would support Saito over her faction boss Motegi. Yoshimasa Hayashi reportedly told fellow lawmakers on 16 August that he was keen on running. On 17 August, Yōko Kamikawa announced her candidacy in a tweet. She later stated that she was running to make Japan "an attractive country for all". That same day, several candidates were asked on their position on same-sex marriage. Kono stated he supported it, Ishiba, Saito, Kato and Kamikawa took a neutral stance, while Kobayashi and Takaichi stated they opposed it. Koizumi, Hayashi and Motegi did not give a response. By 17 August, it was reported that Hayashi and Kono had secured enough endorsements to declare their own candidacies. Upper House Diet member Hiroshi Yamada told reporters on 21 August that Economic Security Minister Sanae Takaichi had secured 20 endorsements, and she believed she would formally announce her candidacy next week. She had reportedly been struggling to get the adequate endorsements.

=== Early declarations ===
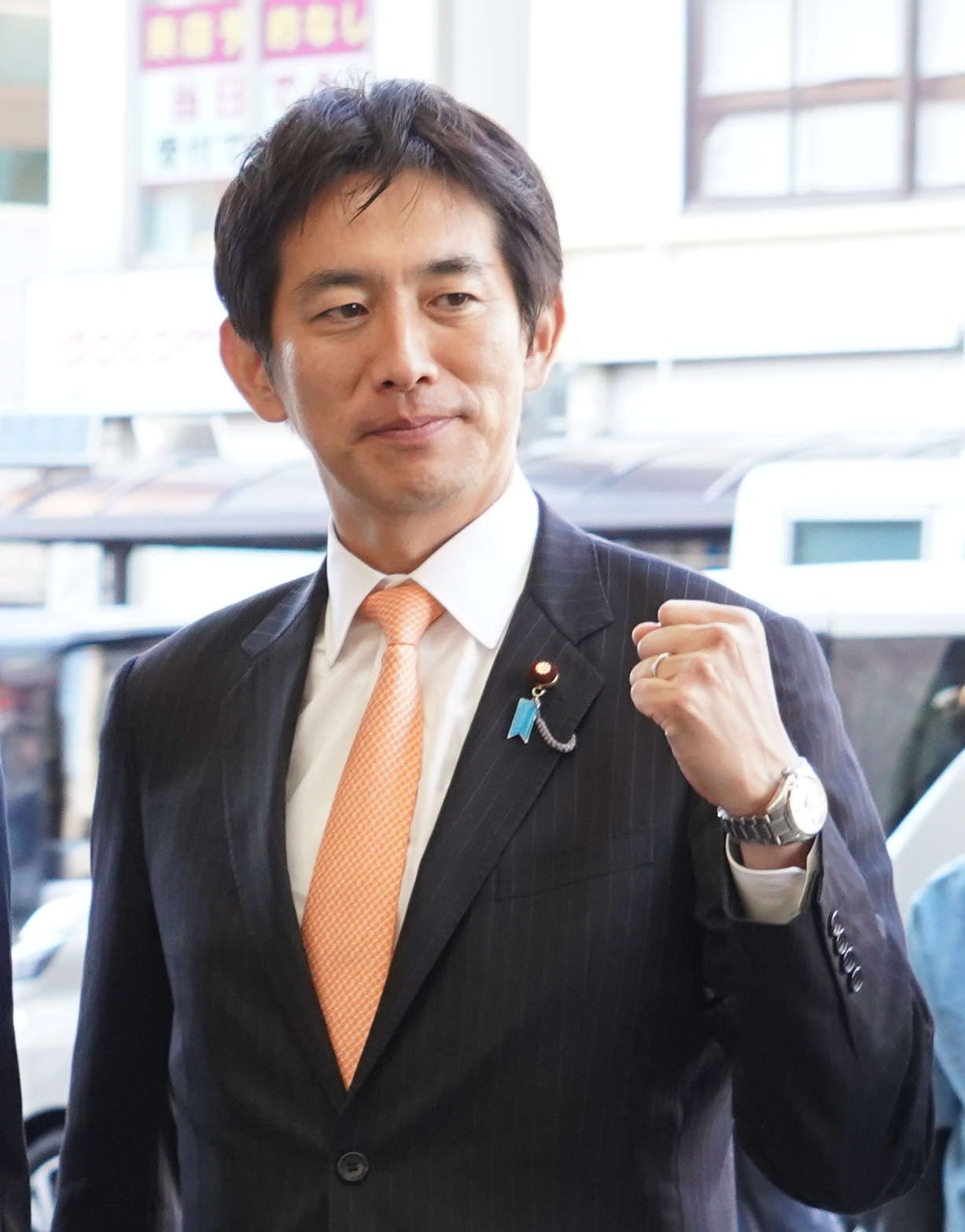
On 19 August, Takayuki Kobayashi became the first to formally announce their leadership candidacy

The day after Kishida's announcement, Kobayashi appeared to have already amassed 20 endorsements, and was preparing to announce his candidacy soon. He visited sites related to North Korea's 1977 abduction of Megumi Yokota on 17 August. Former Minister of State for Economic Security Takayuki Kobayashi became the first to formally announce his candidacy during a press conference on August 19, emphasizing the need to "reform" the party. On 23 August Kobayashi stated "We should proceed carefully and cautiously with optional separate surnames for married couples". Kishida was reportedly frustrated with Kobayashi's leadership bid, particularly his sharp criticism of punishments given to the Abe faction that was part of the party's response to the slush fund scandal. That same day, House of Councillors member Shigeharu Aoyama declared his candidacy.

The same day, Katsunobu Kato said he had close to 20 endorsements. Yomiuri reported that Koizumi planned to formally announce his candidacy on August 30. The following day it was reported that Yoshimasa Hayashi was struggling to announce his own candidacy and amass his own endorsements. He originally planned to announce on August 27, but had to postpone in order to prioritize the government response to an imminent typhoon, in his capacity as Chief Cabinet Secretary. On 25 August, Kamikawa told reporters that she had secured more than 20 endorsements.

Shigeru Ishiba was in Taipei when the news of Kishida's not seeking another term broke. He stated that if he could receive 20 endorsements, he would run. He also said he'd be open to appointing Abe faction members to key posts if they're reelected in a general election. Ishiba announced his candidacy on 24 August in his home prefecture of Tottori. He described his campaign as the "culmination of my 38 year political career". His fifth LDP presidential campaign, Ishiba said it would be his last. At the event, he questioned whether the party should endorse candidates who received kickbacks at the next general election, referring to the slush fund scandal. A press conference was expected the following week.

Digital Minister Taro Kono announced his candidacy in a press conference held on 26 August in Tokyo. He became the first sitting Cabinet minister to announce. In his press conference, he stated he wanted to "move the country forward" as leader. Kono also acknowledged that his "record on reform" would be put to the test during the election. On economic policy, he said he would return to "fiscal austerity." Kono also said he would ask lawmakers receiving kickbacks to return the money. The day after Kono's press conference, Taro Aso told faction members that he would personally back Kono, but would allow members to support other candidates. Members of the dissolved Abe faction were reportedly frustrated with Ishiba's and Kono's questioning of support to members who received financial kickbacks. Kono announced on 31 August that he would leave the Aso faction if he became Prime Minister.

Kobayashi, Kono and Ishiba were dubbed "The Early Birds" by the Council on Foreign Relations for being the first to announce.

=== Field widens as campaign intensifies ===
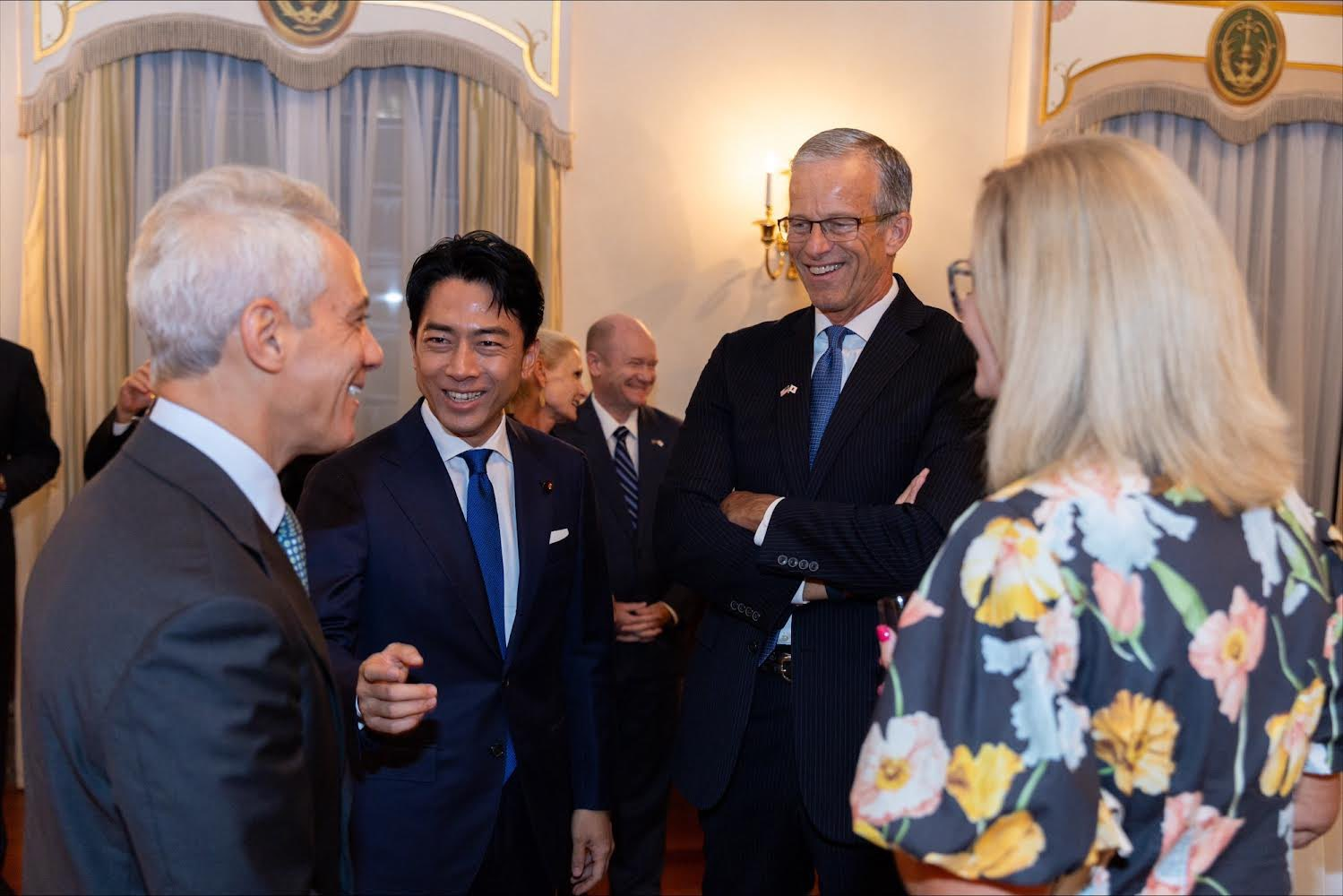
Shinjirō Koizumi at the U.S. Embassy in Tokyo on 31 August 2024. He announced his campaign on 6 September.

On 27 August, it was reported that Takaichi had also been forced to postpone her campaign announcement to the following week due to a typhoon. The next day Sankei reported she would officially declare on 9 September. Hayashi was reportedly planning to formally declare his candidacy on 3 September. Meanwhile, Koizumi confirmed in a tweet that he would formally announce his campaign in a press conference on 6 September. On 30 August, former Birthrate Minister and former leadership candidate Seiko Noda said she would formally announce her candidacy once she gathers enough support.

Chief Cabinet Secretary Yoshimasa Hayashi announced his campaign in a press conference on 3 September. Hayashi, who had experience as a cabinet minister in various capacities, advocated for "people-friendly politics" in his speech. He pledged to implement wage hikes, election reform, and regional revitalization.

Kobayashi and Ishiba clashed on taxes and reform. On 3 September Kobayashi stated he opposed any income tax increases, while Ishiba said he planned to increase taxation. The two also disagreed on the creation of a Ministry for Disaster Prevention; Ishiba supported it while Kobayashi argued it would create more unnecessary bureaucracy. The same day, Kobayashi met with Taro Aso.

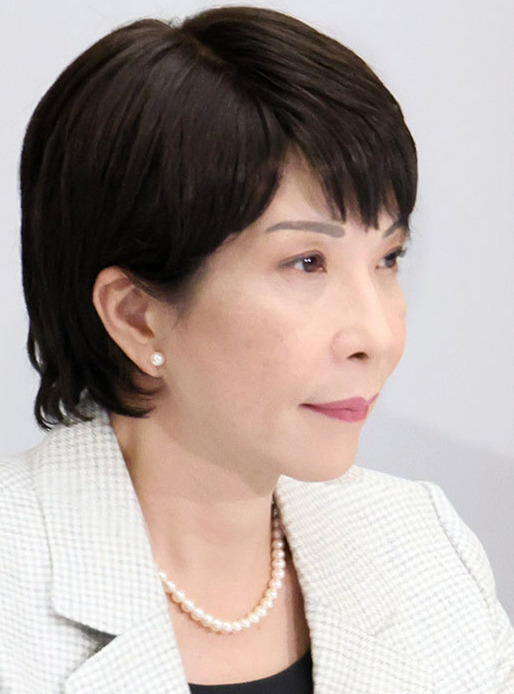
On 9 September, Sanae Takaichi announced her second campaign for the LDP leadership

Former Foreign Minister and LDP Secretary-General Toshimitsu Motegi entered the race on 4 September, promising not to raise taxes.

Kato confirmed he had 20 endorsements by 6 September and was expected to announce his campaign on 10 September. Noda was reportedly struggling to pick up 20 endorsements of her own.

On 6 September, former Environment Minister Shinjirō Koizumi, who had been considered a "rising star" of the LDP, officially declared his candidacy in the leadership election at a press conference. He pledged to introduce legislation that would legalize separate surnames for married couples, promising it would "be done within a year". Koizumi promised to dissolve the lower of house and call a general election "as soon as possible" if elected president and later Prime Minister. He proposed holding a national referendum to determine whether or not Article 9 of the Constitution should be amended. His press conference also focused on regulatory and political reform; Koizumi said he would seek an LDP without factional dynamics. Koizumi gave his first street speech the following day in Tokyo's Ginza.

Kono said on 6 September that a Constitutional amendment concerning Article 9 should include "collective self-defense rights" beyond clearly stating the rights of the Japan Self-Defense Forces. The previous day his campaign released a comprehensive policy vision, which included labor market reform, use of renewable energy, the creation of a digital safety net and lowering the age of candidacy to 18 years old.

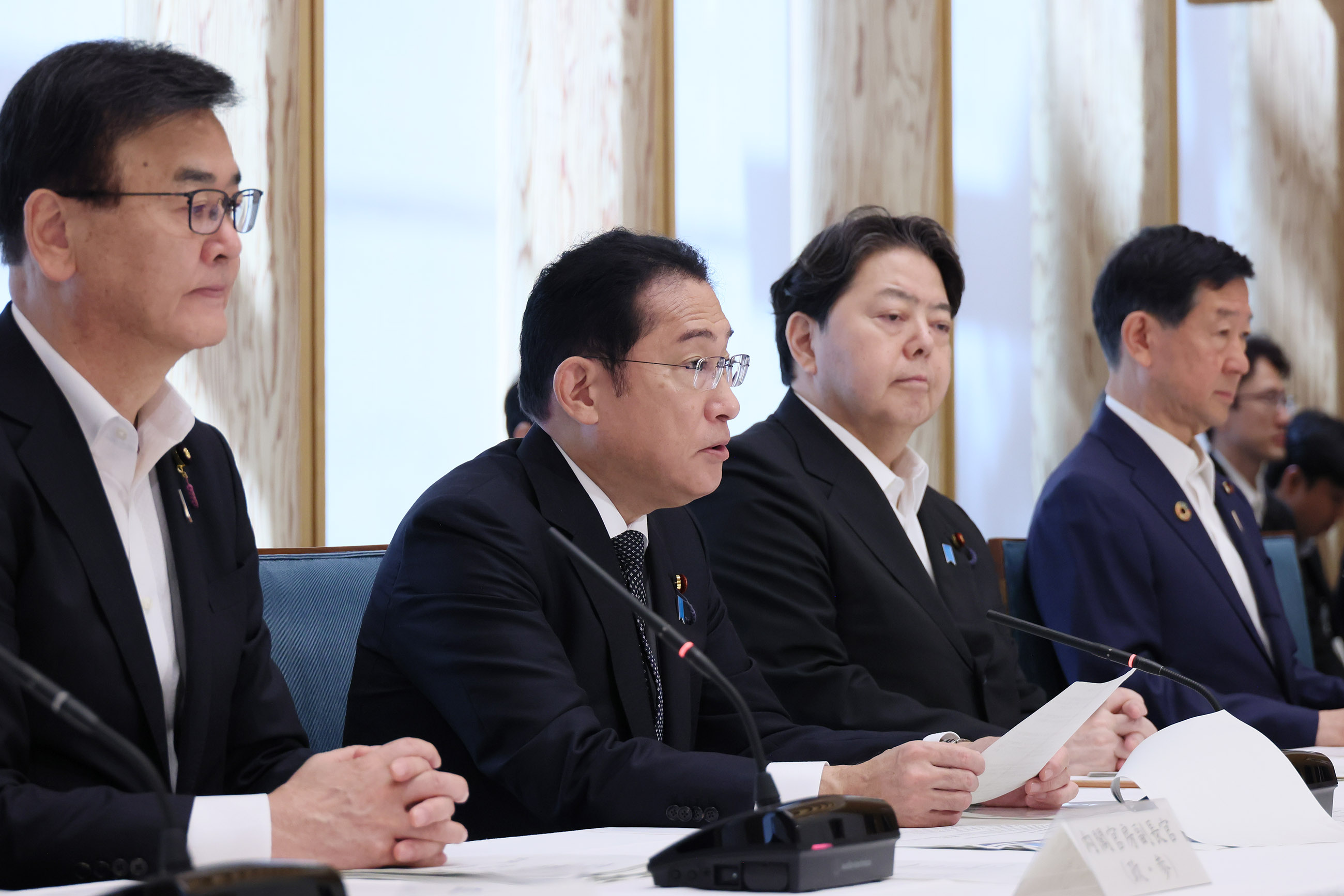
Yoshimasa Hayashi, pictured on 5 September with Fumio Kishida, was forced to postpone his campaign announcement to oversee his duties as Chief Cabinet Secretary.

Several candidates began campaigning on 7 September. Koizumi held a stump speech in Tokyo's Ginza district, where he promised to "change the LDP, which can currently carry out reforms only to the extent permitted by industry groups and vested interests." Kono meanwhile a drugstore in Tokyo to tout the progress of the My Number identification card rollout. Kobayashi led a meeting of fellow lawmakers who supported his candidacy in Matsuyama, Ehime Prefecture. Seiko Noda claimed she was close to securing enough endorsements to run herschel, although her campaign materialized.

On 9 September, Economic Security Minister Sanae Takaichi announced her second campaign for the LDP leadership, becoming the first female candidate to officially declare their candidacy. The following day, former Health Minister Katsunobu Katō formally announced his campaign. That same day, former Internal Affairs Minister Seiko Noda announced she would not run in the election and endorsed Koizumi's candidacy. On 11 September, Foreign Affairs Minister Yōko Kamikawa announced her candidacy.

On 19 September, the tabloid Daily Shinchō reported that the Abe family would be supporting Kobayashi as opposed to Takaichi, who Abe supported in the 2021 election. The magazine claimed Abe had only supported Takaichi as a favor to former Prime Minister Yoshirō Mori. Several members of the former Abe faction had endorsed Kobayashi, who considered himself to be Abe's political successor.

=== Front runners emerge ===
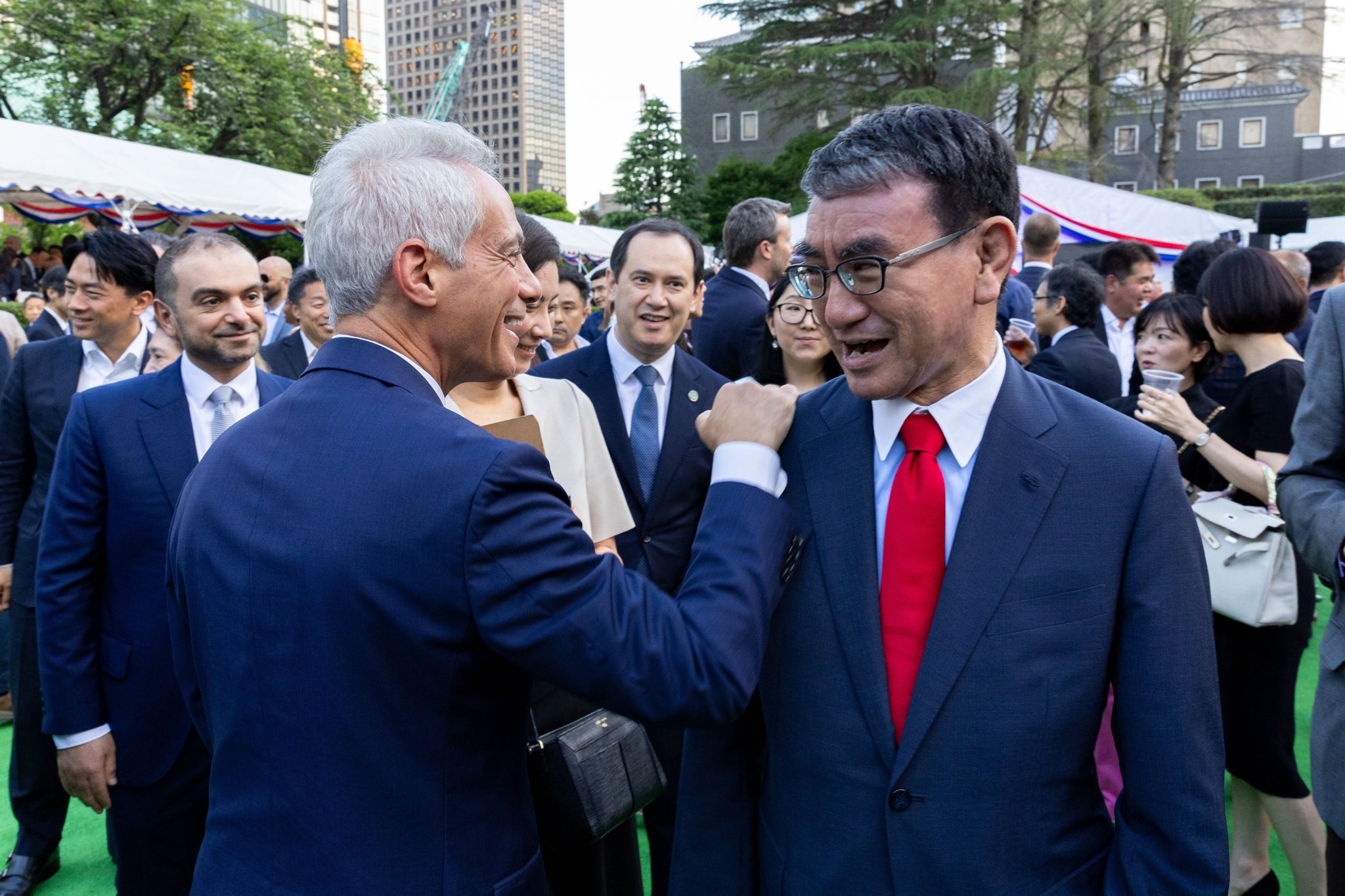
Kono Taro with U.S. Ambassador to Japan Rahm Emanuel in June 2024. Kono's campaign struggled to gain momentum.

As the race began to start in full in mid-September, three candidates were largely talked about, primarily being given the breadth of media coverage; Shinjiro Koizumi, Shigeru Ishiba, and Sanae Takaichi all were largely talked about. Other candidates, such as Taro Kono and Yōko Kamikawa also got limited attention.

Koizumi was damaged in a series of gaffes, such as his father stating he was not ready to be Prime Minister. He also made controversial statements on the issue of North Korean abductees, stating he'd meet with "Kim", referring to Kim Jong Un. Takaichi began to be looked upon more favorably by rank-and-file members.

In terms of base, Koizumi's was firmly rooted in Diet members, mainly due to Yoshihide Suga lending Koizumi support. He had secured roughly 50 Diet members, compared to the other two frontrunners, Ishiba and Takaichi, with just around 30. While Hayashi and Kobayashi had secured numbers in the 40s, they had since fallen behind the fray in public opinion polling. Motegi secured just over 30.

Ishiba practiced a strategy of consolidating national support, as he had been consistently ranked one of the most popular politicians in the country, but had burned bridges with much of the party establishment during the Abe cabinets. Takaichi mixed both of these strategies and consolidated lawmakers involved in the slush fund scandal which rocked the LDP earlier in the year, causing the Seiwa Seisaku Kenkyūkai to dissolve. However, she was still highly unpopular with most establishment figures. She gained serious momentum entering the campaign period, and began to lead in party member polls.

=== Election day and Ishiba's victory ===
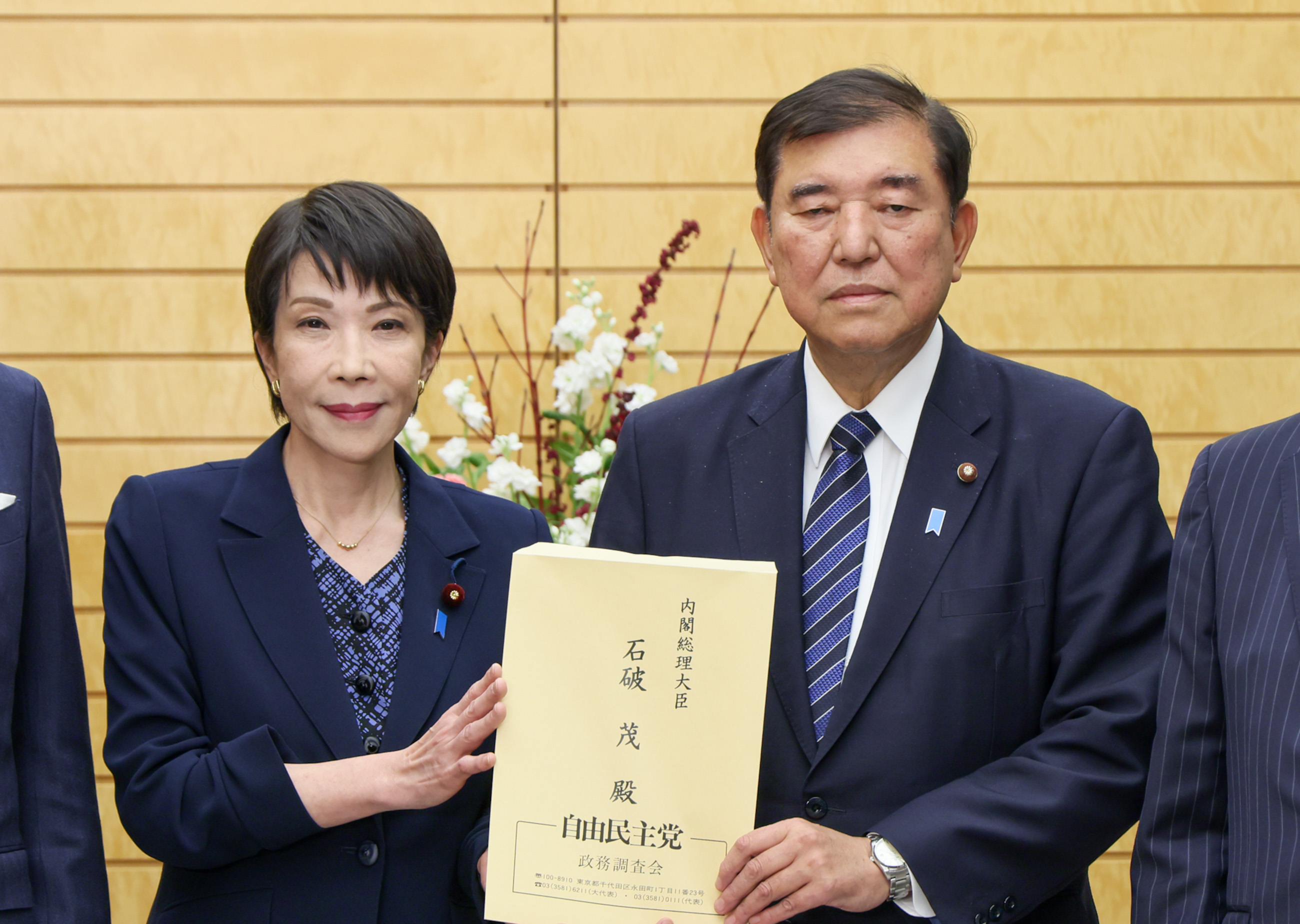
Ishiba (right) defeated Takaichi (left) in the final round of voting to become LDP President on 27 September 2024.

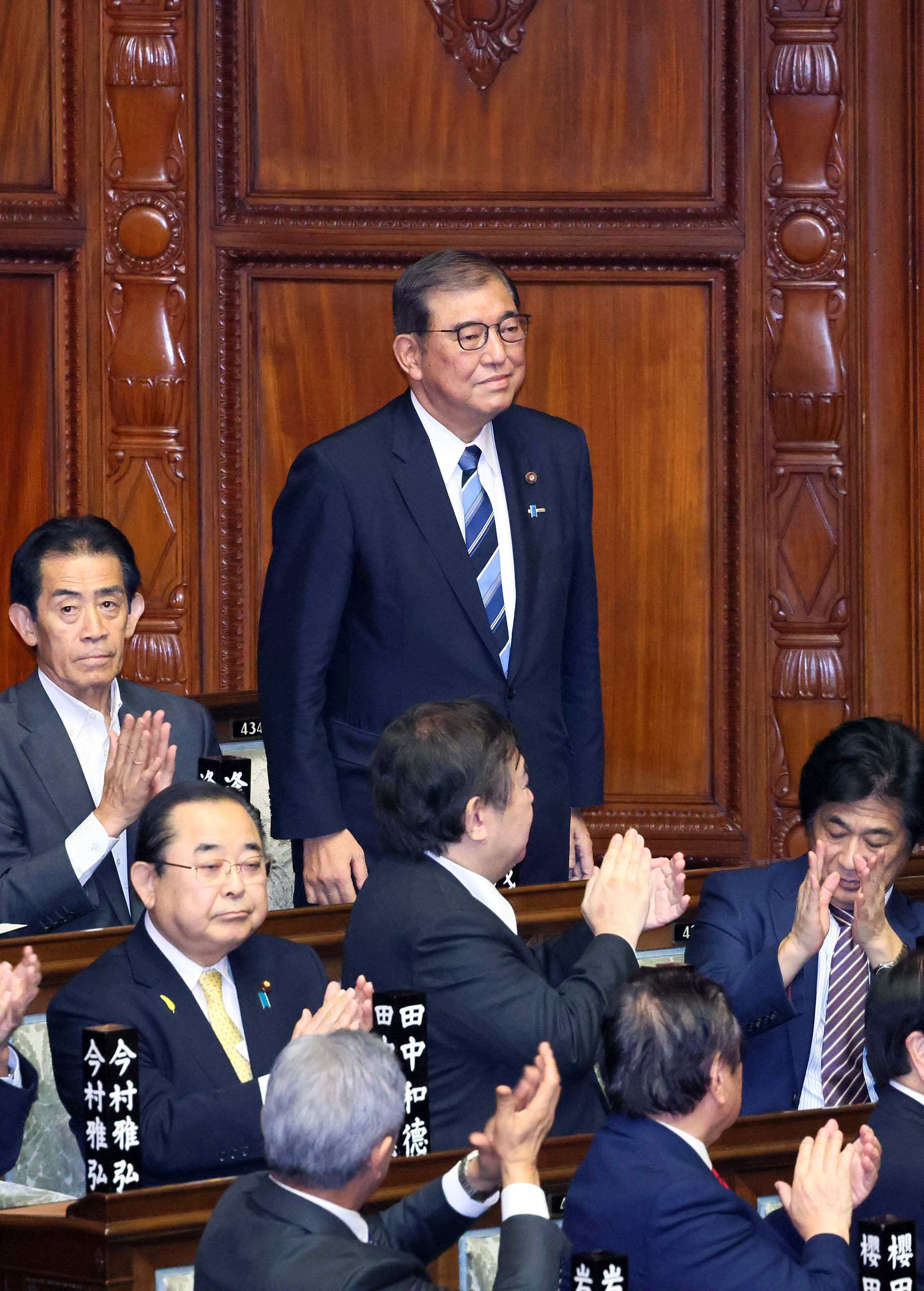
Ishiba was designated as Prime Minister on 1 October 2024.

The first round of the election was held on 27 September in which Takaichi received the most votes. Ishiba advanced to the run-off, coming in second place after receiving 154 votes against Takaichi's 181. Koizumi, the third front-runner of the election, failed to advance to the run-off as did the other remaining candidates. The Japan Times noted after the first round that the other six candidates had "failed to make headway" against the three front-runners: Ishiba, Takaichi and Koizumi.

Following a political funds scandal prior to the election, most of the official factions, including the one that had been led by former Prime Minister Shinzo Abe, former Secretary-General Toshihiro Nikai, leadership candidate Motegi and Prime Minister Fumio Kishida, were dissolved. For the run-off, Kono's faction, led by Taro Aso, indicated its support for Takaichi. After Hayashi's defeat, Prime Minister Kishida reportedly whipped votes for Ishiba in the second round of voting after having endorsed Hayashi.

In the leadership election on 27 September 2024, Ishiba narrowly defeated Takaichi in a second-round runoff, winning a total of 215 votes (52.57%) from 189 parliamentary members and 26 prefectural chapters, making him the new LDP leader and prime minister-designate. Ishiba's victory was described by commentators as unexpected and an upset, owing to his long history of failed leadership bids and his relative unpopularity with many LDP members of the Diet.

== Schedule ==
Jiji reported on 21 July that the LDP would establish an election committee for the presidential election on 26 July. The 11-person committee is headed by Diet Member Ichiro Aisawa, and was reported to most likely determine the election date to be between September 20 to 30, with the two most likely dates being the 20th and 27th.

On 19 August, a date of 27 September was set for the election.

=== Timetable ===
Key dates
Date	Event
14 August	Incumbent LDP President Fumio Kishida announces he will not seek a second term as party leader. He refuses to endorse a successor.
19 August	Former Economic Security Minister Takayuki Kobayashi announces his candidacy, becoming the first to do so.
24 August	Former Defense Minister Shigeru Ishiba declares his candidacy. It is his fifth party leadership campaign.
26 August	Digital Minister Taro Kono announces his campaign. It is his third party leadership campaign.
3 September	Chief Cabinet Secretary Yoshimasa Hayashi declares his campaign. It is his second party leadership campaign.
4 September	LDP Secretary-General Toshimitsu Motegi announces his candidacy.
6 September	Former Environment Minister Shinjirō Koizumi declares his candidacy.
9 September	Economic Security Minister Sanae Takaichi declares her candidacy. It is her second leadership campaign and is the first female candidate to formally become a candidate in this election.
10 September	Former Health Minister Katsunobu Katō declares his candidacy.
11 September	Foreign Minister Yōko Kamikawa declares her candidacy.
12 September	Nomination period closes; deadline for potential candidates to gather the support of twenty LDP MPs to qualify for the first ballot. Official campaign period begins.
26 September	Party member voting deadline.
27 September	LDP MPs vote in the first ballot to reduce the race to two candidates. Shigeru Ishiba defeats Sanae Takaichi in the second round runoff, making him Prime Minister-designate of Japan.

== Candidates ==
=== Declared ===
The following candidates have officially declared their candidacies for the leadership:

Candidate(s)	Date of birth	Current position	Party faction	Electoral district	Reference(s)
Yoshimasa Hayashi	19 January 1961 (age 63)	Chief Cabinet Secretary (since 2023); Member of the House of Representatives (since 2021) Previous offices held: Minister for Foreign Affairs (2021–2023); Minister of Education, Culture, Sports, Science and Technology (2017–2018); Minister of Agriculture, Forestry and Fisheries (2012–2014; 2015); Minister of State for Economic and Fiscal Policy (2009); Minister of Defense (2008); Member of the House of Councillors (1995–2021)	None (former Kōchikai)	Yamaguchi 3rd	
Shigeru Ishiba	4 February 1957 (age 67)	Member of the House of Representatives (since 1986) Previous offices held: Minister for Overcoming Population Decline and Vitalizing Local Economy (2014–2016); Secretary-General of the LDP (2012–2014); Minister of Agriculture, Forestry and Fisheries (2008–2009); Minister of Defense (2002–2004; 2007–2008)	Suigetsukai (Ishiba)	Tottori 1st	
Yōko Kamikawa	1 March 1953 (age 71)	Minister for Foreign Affairs (since 2023); Member of the House of Representatives (since 2000) Previous offices held: Minister of Justice (2014–2015; 2017–2018; 2020–2021)	None (former Kōchikai)	Shizuoka 1st	
Katsunobu Katō	22 November 1955 (age 68)	Member of the House of Representatives (since 2003) Previous offices held: Minister of Health, Labour and Welfare (2017–2018; 2019–2020; 2022–2023); Chief Cabinet Secretary (2020–2021); Minister of State for Measures for Declining Birthrate (2015–2017)	Heisei Kenkyūkai (Motegi)	Okayama 5th (Note: Seat to be eliminated at the next general election.)	
Takayuki Kobayashi	29 November 1974 (age 49)	Member of the House of Representatives (since 2012) Previous offices held: Minister of State for Economic Security (2021–2022)	None (former Shisuikai)	Chiba 2nd	
Shinjirō Koizumi	14 April 1981 (age 43)	Member of the House of Representatives (since 2009) Previous offices held: Minister of the Environment (2019–2021)	None	Kanagawa 11th	
Taro Kono	10 January 1963 (age 61)	Minister for Digital Transformation (since 2022); Member of the House of Representatives (since 1996) Previous offices held: Minister for Administrative Reform and Regulatory Reform (2015–2016; 2020–2021); Minister of Defense (2019–2020); Minister for Foreign Affairs (2017–2019); Chair of the National Public Safety Commission (2015–2016)	Shikōkai (Asō)	Kanagawa 15th	
Toshimitsu Motegi	7 October 1955 (age 68)	Secretary-General of the Liberal Democratic Party (since 2021); Member of the House of Representatives (since 1993) Previous offices held: Minister for Foreign Affairs (2019–2021); Minister of State for Economic and Fiscal Policy (2017–2019); Minister of Economy, Trade and Industry (2012–2014)	Heisei Kenkyūkai (Motegi)	Tochigi 5th	
Sanae Takaichi	7 March 1961 (age 63)	Minister of State for Economic Security (since 2022); Member of the House of Representatives (since 1993) Previous offices held: Minister for Internal Affairs and Communications (2014–2017; 2019–2020)	None (former Seiwakai)	Nara 2nd	

=== Declined ===
- Shigeharu Aoyama, Member of the House of Councillors (2016–present)
- Fumio Kishida, incumbent Prime Minister (2021–present), Minister for Foreign Affairs (2012–2017), Member of the House of Representatives (1996–present)
- Seiko Noda, former Minister-in-charge of Measures against Declining Birthrate (2021–2022), former Minister for Internal Affairs and Communications (2017–2018), Member of the House of Representatives (1993–present) (endorsed Koizumi)
- Yūko Obuchi, Minister of Economy, Trade and Industry (2014), Member of the House of Representatives (2000–present)
- Ken Saitō, Minister of Economy, Trade and Industry (2023–present), former Minister of Justice (2022–2023), former Minister of Agriculture, Forestry and Fisheries (2017–2018), Member of the House of Representatives (2009–present) (endorsed Koizumi)
- Yoshihide Suga, former Prime Minister (2020–2021), former Chief Cabinet Secretary (2012–2020), Member of the House of Representatives (1996–present), former Minister for Internal Affairs and Communications (2006–2007) (endorsed Koizumi)

== Supporters ==
=== Recommenders ===
Party regulations require candidates to have the written support at least 20 Diet members, known as recommenders, to run.

Yoshimasa Hayashi

Leader of recommenders

- Norihisa Tamura (Member of the House of Representatives for Mie 1st district; Former Minister of Health, Labour and Welfare) (former Kōchikai)

Campaign Manager

- Taku Etō (Member of the House of Representatives for Miyazaki 2nd district; Former Minister of Agriculture, Forestry and Fisheries) (no faction)

Recommenders

- Toshiyuki Adachi (Member of the House of Councillors from National PR block) (former Kōchikai)
- Shinya Fujiki (Member of the House of Councillors from National PR block) (former Kōchikai)
- Toshiharu Furukawa (Member of the House of Councillors from Saitama) (former Seiwakai)
- Shigeyuki Goto (Member of the House of Representatives for Nagano 4th district; Former Minister of Health, Labour and Welfare) (no faction)
- Hokuto Hoshi (Member of the House of Councillors from Fukushima) (no faction)
- Rintaro Ishibashi (Member of the House of Representatives for Chugoku PR block) (former Kōchikai)
- Hirotaka Ishihara (Member of the House of Representatives for Tokyo PR block) (former Kōchikai)
- Shunpei Kaneko (Member of the House of Representatives for Gifu 4th district) (former Kōchikai)
- Yozo Kaneko (Member of the House of Representatives for Nagasaki 4th district) (former Kōchikai)
- Kazuhiro Kobayashi (Member of the House of Councillors from Niigata) (former Kōchikai)
- Atsushi Koga (Member of the House of Representatives for Fukuoka 3rd district) (former Kōchikai)
- Yuichiro Koga (Member of the House of Councillors from Nagasaki) (former Kōchikai)
- Takashi Koyari (Member of the House of Councillors from Shiga) (former Kōchikai)
- Shoji Nishida (Member of the House of Representatives for Ishikawa 3rd district) (former Kōchikai)
- Toshiyuki Ochi (Member of the House of Councillors from National PR block) (former Kōchikai)
- Mitsuru Sakurai (Member of the House of Councillors from Miyagi) (no faction)
- Kōichi Watanabe (Member of the House of Representatives for Hokkaido PR block) (former Kōchikai)
- Keisuke Yamamoto (Member of the House of Councillors from Nagasaki) (former Kōchikai)
Shigeru Ishiba

Leader of recommenders

- Takeshi Iwaya (Member of the House of Representatives for Ōita 3rd district; Former Minister of Defense) (no faction)

Campaign Manager

- Kazuhiko Aoki (Member of the House of Councillors from Tottori-Shimane) (Heiseiken)

Recommenders

- Ryosei Akazawa (Member of the House of Representatives for Tottori 2nd district) (Suigetsukai)
- Kazuhiro Fujii (Member of the House of Councillors from National PR block) (no faction)
- Goshi Hosono (Member of the House of Representatives for Shizuoka 5th district; Former Minister of the Environment) (former Shisuikai)
- Yoshitaka Itō (Member of the House of Representatives for Hokkaido 7th district) (former Shisuikai)
- Hirohiko Izumida (Member of the House of Representatives for Hokuriku-Shinetsu PR block; Former Governor of Niigata Prefecture) (no faction)
- Hiroaki Kadoyama (Member of the House of Representatives for Southern Kanto PR block) (Suigetsukai)
- Shōji Maitachi (Member of the House of House of Councillors from Tottori-Shimane) (Suigetsukai)
- Seiichiro Murakami (Member of the House of Representatives for Ehime 2nd district; Former Minister of State for Regulatory Reform) (no faction)
- Akihisa Nagashima (Member of the House of Representatives for Tokyo PR block) (former Shisuikai)
- Yasuhiro Ozato (Member of the House of Representatives for Kyushu PR block) (no faction)
- Keiichiro Tachibana (Member of the House of Representatives for Toyama 3rd district) (no faction)
- Yoshinori Tadokoro (Member of the House of Representatives for Northern Kanto PR block) (Suigetsukai)
- Masaaki Taira (Member of the House of Representatives for Tokyo 4th district) (Suigetsukai)
- Koichi Tani (Member of the House of Representatives for Hyogo 5th district; Former Chairman of the National Public Safety Commission) (former Shisuikai)
- Hiroyuki Togashi (Member of the House of Representatives for Akita 1st district) (Suigetsukai)
- Tetsuya Yagi (Member of the House of Representatives for Aichi 11th district) (Suigetsukai)
- Toshio Yamada (Member of the House of Councillors from National PR block) (former Kinmirai Seiji Kenkyūkai)
- Hirotake Yasuoka (Member of the Representatives for Kyushu PR block) (no faction)
Yoko Kamikawa

Leader of recommenders

- Hideki Makihara (Member of the House of Representatives for Northern Kanto PR block) (no faction)

Campaign Manager

- Ryuji Koizumi (Member of the House of Representatives for Saitama 11th district; Incumbent Minister of Justice) (former Shisuikai)

Recommenders

- Yoichi Fukazawa (Member of the House of Representatives for Shizuoka 4th district) (former Kōchikai)
- Noriko Horiuchi (Member of the House of Representatives for Yamanashi 2nd district; Former Minister in charge of Promoting Vaccinations) (former Kōchikai)
- Tatsunori Ibayashi (Member of the House of Representatives for Shizuoka 2nd district) (Shikōkai)
- Yosei Ide (Member of the House of Representatives for Nagano 3rd district) (Shikōkai)
- Eriko Imai (Member of the House of Councillors from National PR block) (Shikōkai)
- Kuniko Inoguchi (Member of the House of Councillors from Chiba; Former Minister of State for Gender Equality and Social Affairs) (Shikōkai)
- Toshifumi Kojima (Member of the House of House of Representatives for Chugoku PR block) (former Kōchikai)
- Ayano Kunimitsu (Member of the House of Representatives for Ibaraki 6th district) (former Kōchikai)
- Takao Makino (Member of the House of Councillors from Shizuoka) (Heiseiken)
- Takeaki Matsumoto (Member of the House of Representatives for Hyogo 11th district; Incumbent Minister for Internal Affairs and Communications) (Shikōkai)
- Midori Matsushima (Member of the House of Representatives for Tokyo 14th district; Former Minister of Justice) (former Seiwakai)
- Masako Mori (Member of the House of Councillors from Fukushima; Former Minister of Justice) (former Seiwakai)
- Masahito Moriyama (Member of the House of Representatives for Kinki PR block; Incumbent Minister of Education, Culture, Sports, Science and Technology) (former Kōchikai)
- Yūsuke Nakanishi (Member of the House of Councillors from Tokushima-Kōchi) (Shikōkai)
- Hirobumi Niki (Member of the House of Representatives for Tokushima 1st district) (Shikōkai)
- Akiko Santō (Member of the House of Councillors from National PR block; Former President of the House of Councillors) (Shikōkai)
- Yohei Wakabayashi (Member of the House of Councillors from Shizuoka) (former Shisuikai)
- Shunichi Yamaguchi (Member of the Representatives for Tokushima 2nd district; Former Minister of State for Okinawa and Northern Territories Affairs) (Shikōkai)
Katsunobu Kato

Leader of recommenders

- Kosaburo Nishime (Member of the House of Representatives for Okinawa 4th district; Former Minister of Reconstruction)) (Heiseiken)

Campaign Manager

- Gaku Hashimoto (Member of the House of Representatives for Okayama 4th district) (Heiseiken)

Recommenders

- Toshiko Abe (Member of the House of Representatives for Chugoku PR block) (no faction)
- Takashi Hanyūda (Member of the House of Councillors from National PR block) (former Seiwakai)
- Natsumi Higa (Member of the House of Councillors from National PR block) (Heiseiken)
- Shojiro Hiranuma (Member of the House of Representatives for Okayama 3rd district) (former Shisuikai)
- Akiko Honda (Member of the House of Councillors from National PR block) (no faction)
- Soichiro Imaeda (Member of the House of Representatives for Aichi 14th district) (Shikōkai)
- Masahiro Ishida (Member of the House of Councillors from National PR block) (former Seiwakai)
- Masahiro Ishii (Member of the House of Councillors from Okayama; Former Governor of Okayama Prefecture) (former Seiwakai)
- Hanako Jimi (Member of the House of Councillors from National PR block) (former Shisuikai)
- Yoshitami Kameoka (Member of the House of Representatives for Tohoku PR block) (former Seiwakai)
- Katsutoshi Kaneda (Member of the House of Representatives for Tohoku PR block; Former Minister of Justice) (former Shisuikai)
- Nobuhide Minorikawa (Member of the House of Representatives for Akita 3rd district) (no faction)
- Yasushi Miura (Member of the House of Councillors from National PR block) (Heiseiken)
- Hideyuki Nakano (Member of the House of Representatives for Saitama 7th district) (former Shisuikai)
- Kimi Onoda (Member of the House of Councillors from Okayama) (Heiseiken)
- Yoshitaka Sakurada (Member of the House of Representatives for Southern Kanto PR block; Former Minister of State for the Tokyo Olympic and Paralympic Games) (former Shisuikai)
- Kenichiro Ueno (Member of the House of Representatives for Shiga 2nd district) (former Kinmirai Seiji Kenkyūkai)
- Takashi Yamashita (Member of the Representatives for Okayama 2nd district; Former Minister of Justice) (Heiseiken)
Takayuki Kobayashi

Leader of recommenders

- Yohei Matsumoto (Member of the House of Representatives for Tokyo PR block) (former Shisuikai)

Campaign Manager

- Kenji Yamada (Member of the House of Representatives for Hyogo 7th district) (Shikōkai)

Recommenders

- Tetsuma Esaki (Member of the House of Representatives for Aichi 10th district; Former Minister of State for Okinawa and Northern Territories Affairs) (former Shisuikai)
- Taro Honda (Member of the House of Representatives for Kyoto 5th district) (no faction)
- Taku Ishii (Member of the House of Representatives for Tokai PR block) (former Seiwakai)
- Kazuchika Iwata (Member of the House of Representatives for Kyushu PR block) (former Kōchikai)
- Yasushi Katsume (Member of the House of Representatives for Kyoto 1st district) (no faction)
- Hiromichi Kumada (Member of the House of Representatives for Aichi 1st district) (no faction)
- Hisashi Matsumoto (Member of the House of Representatives for Chiba 13th district) (former Seiwakai)
- Shunsuke Mutai (Member of the House of Representatives for Hokuriku-Shinetsu PR block) (Shikōkai)
- Takamoto Nakagawa (Member of the House of Representatives for Tokai PR block) (Shikōkai)
- Yasutaka Nakasone (Member of the House of Representatives for Gunma 1st district) (former Shisuikai)
- Keitaro Ohno (Member of the House of Representatives for Kagawa 3rd district) (no faction)
- Makoto Oniki (Member of the House of Representatives for Fukuoka 2nd district) (former Kinmirai Seiji Kenkyūkai)
- Hiroaki Saito (Member of the House of Representatives for Niigata 3rd district) (Shikōkai)
- Akihisa Shiozaki (Member of the House of Representatives for Ehime 1st district) (former Seiwakai)
- Hirohisa Takagi (Member of the House of Representatives for Hokkaido 3rd district) (former Shisuikai)
- Arata Takebe (Member of the House of Representatives for Hokkaido 12th district) (former Shisuikai)
- Taido Tanose (Member of the House of Representatives for Nara 3rd district) (former Kinmirai Seiji Kenkyūkai)
- Rio Tomono (Member of the House of Councillors from National PR block) (former Seiwakai)
- Toshirō Toyoda (Member of the House of Councillors from Chiba) (Shikōkai)
Shinjiro Koizumi

Leader of recommenders

- Eiichiro Washio (Member of the House of Representatives for Hokuriku-Shinetsu PR block) (former Shisuikai)

Campaign Manager

- Masanobu Ogura (Member of the House of Representatives for Tokyo 23rd district; Former Minister of State for Gender Equality) (former Shisuikai)

Recommenders

- Masashi Adachi (Member of the House of Councillors from National PR block) (no faction)
- Jiro Akama (Member of the House of Representatives for Kanagawa 14th district) (Shikōkai)
- Kentaro Asahi (Member of the House of Councillors from Tokyo) (no faction)
- Naoki Furukawa (Member of the House of Representatives for Kanagawa 6th district) (no faction)
- Junji Hasegawa (Member of the House of Representatives for Ehime 4th district) (no faction)
- Yasushi Hosaka (Member of the House of Representatives for Saitama 4th district) (no faction)
- Tsuyoshi Hoshino (Member of the House of Representatives for Southern Kanto PR block) (no faction)
- Ayuko Kato (Member of the House of Representatives for Yamagata 3rd district; Former Minister of State for Gender Equality) (no faction)
- Fumiaki Kobayashi (Member of the House of Representatives for Hiroshima 7th district) (former Kōchikai)
- Hiroo Kotera (Member of the House of Representatives for Shiga 4th district) (former Shisuikai)
- Junko Mihara (Member of the House of Councillors from Kanagawa) (no faction)
- Shingo Miyake (Member of the House of Councillors from Kagawa) (no faction)
- Seiko Noda (Member of the House of Representatives for Gifu 1st district; Former Minister for Internal Affairs and Communications) (no faction)
- Masaki Ogushi (Member of the House of Representatives for Kinki PR block) (no faction)
- Nobuhide Takemura (Member of the House of Representatives for Shiga 3rd district) (no faction)
- Ryosei Tanaka (Member of the House of Representatives for Saitama 15th district) (no faction)
- Kiyoto Tsuji (Member of the House of Representatives for Tokyo 2nd district) (former Kōchikai)
- Miki Yamada (Member of the House of Representatives for Tokyo 1st district) (former Seiwakai)
- Yūji Yamamoto (Member of the Representatives for Shikoku PR block; Former Minister of Agriculture, Forestry and Fisheries) (no faction)
Taro Kono

Leader of recommenders

- Eisuke Mori (Member of the House of Representatives for Chiba 11th district; Former Minister of Justice) (Shikōkai)

Campaign Manager

- Keizō Takemi (Member of the House of Councillors from National PR block; Incumbent Minister of Health, Labour and Welfare) (Shikōkai)

Recommenders

- Kenya Akiba (Member of the House of Representatives for Tohoku PR block; Former Minister of Reconstruction) (former Heiseiken)
- Keiichiro Asao (Member of the House of Councillors from Kanagawa) (Shikōkai)
- Arfiya Eri (Member of the House of Representatives for Chiba 5th district) (Shikōkai)
- Masahito Fujikawa (Member of the House of Councillors from Aichi) (Shikōkai)
- Toshimitsu Funahashi (Member of the House of Councillors from Hokkaido) (Shikōkai)
- Shinji Inoue (Member of the House of Representatives for Tokyo 25th district; Former Minister of State for Science and Technology Policy) (Shikōkai)
- Tadahiko Ito (Member of the House of Representatives for Aichi 8th district) (former Shisuikai)
- Masayuki Kamiya (Member of the House of Councillors from National PR block) (Shikōkai)
- Karen Makishima (Member of the House of Representatives for Kanagawa 17th district; Former Minister for Digital Transformation) (Shikōkai)
- Yoji Muto (Member of the House of Representatives for Gifu 3rd district) (Shikōkai)
- Keiko Nagaoka (Member of the House of Representatives for Ibaraki 7th district; Former Minister of Education, Culture, Sports, Science and Technology) (Shikōkai)
- Yasumasa Nagasaka (Member of the House of Representatives for Aichi 9th district) (Shikōkai)
- Kenji Nakanishi (Member of the House of Representatives for Kanagawa 3rd district) (Shikōkai)
- Keisuke Suzuki (Member of the House of Representatives for Kanagawa 7th district) (Shikōkai)
- Kazunori Tanaka (Member of the House of Representatives for Kanagawa 10th district; Former Minister of Reconstruction) (Shikōkai)
- Shin Tsuchida (Member of the House of Representatives for Tokyo 13th district) (Shikōkai)
- Ichiro Tsukada (Member of the House of Representatives for Hokuriku-Shinetsu PR block) (Shikōkai)
- Akira Yanagimoto (Member of the Representatives for Kinki PR block) (Shikōkai)
Toshimitsu Motegi

Leader of recommenders

- Yoshitaka Shindō (Member of the House of Representatives for Saitama 2nd district; Incumbent Minister of State for Economic and Fiscal Policy) (Heiseiken)

Campaign Manager

- Hiroshi Kajiyama (Member of the House of Representatives for Ibaraki 4th district; Former Minister of Economy, Trade and Industry) (no faction)

Recommenders

- Kuniyoshi Azuma (Member of the House of Representatives for Hokkaido 6th district) (Heiseiken)
- Yasushi Furukawa (Member of the House of Representatives for Kyushu PR block; Former Governor of Saga Prefecture) (Heiseiken)
- Akira Kato (Member of the House of Councillors from Ibaraki) (Heiseiken)
- Masahisa Miyazaki (Member of the House of Representatives for Kyushu PR block) (Heiseiken)
- Manabu Nagai (Member of the House of Councillors from Yamanashi) (Heiseiken)
- Hideo Ōnishi (Member of the House of Representatives for Tokyo 16th district) (former Seiwakai)
- Hiroyoshi Sasagawa (Member of the House of Representatives for Gunma 3rd district) (Heiseiken)
- Masayoshi Shintani (Member of the House of Representatives for Hiroshima 4th district) (Heiseiken)
- Hayato Suzuki (Member of the House of Representatives for Tokyo 10th district) (Heiseiken)
- Norikazu Suzuki (Member of the House of Representatives for Yamagata 2nd district) (Heiseiken)
- Katsunori Takahashi (Member of the House of Councillors from Tochigi) (Shikōkai)
- Yasuhiro Takami (Member of the House of Representatives for Shimane 2nd district) (Heiseiken)
- Eishun Ueda (Member of the House of Representatives for Toyama 2nd district) (Heiseiken)
- Michiko Ueno (Member of the House of Councillors from Tochigi) (former Seiwakai)
- Shoichi Usui (Member of the House of Councillors from Chiba) (Heiseiken)
- Sachiko Yamamoto (Member of the House of Councillors from Mie) (Heiseiken)
- Sakon Yamamoto (Member of the House of Representatives for Tokai PR block) (Shikōkai)
- Kazuo Yana (Member of the Representatives for Tochigi 3rd district) (former Seiwakai)
Sanae Takaichi

Leader of recommenders

- Hirofumi Nakasone (Member of the House of Councillors from Gunma; Former Minister for Foreign Affairs) (former Shisuikai)

Campaign Manager

- Akimasa Ishikawa (Member of the House of Representatives for Northern Kanto PR block) (no faction)

Recommenders

- Masaaki Akaike (Member of the House of Councillors from National PR block) (former Seiwakai)
- Haruko Arimura (Member of the House of Councillors from National PR block; Former Minister of State for Consumer Affairs and Food Safety) (Shikōkai)
- Tōru Doi (Member of the House of Representatives for Miyagi 1st district) (no faction)
- Seiichi Eto (Member of the House of Councillors from National PR block) (former Seiwakai)
- Keiji Furuya (Member of the House of Representatives for Gifu 5th district; Former Chairman of the National Public Safety Commission) (no faction)
- Iwao Horii (Member of the House of Councillors from Nara) (former Seiwakai)
- Shigeki Kobayashi (Member of the House of Representatives for Kinki PR block) (former Shisuikai)
- Harutomo Kosho (Member of the House of Councillors from Ōita) (former Seiwakai)
- Hiromi Mitsubayashi (Member of the House of Representatives for Saitama 14th district) (former Seiwakai)
- Hiroyuki Nakamura (Member of the House of Representatives for Hokkaido 4th district) (Shikōkai)
- Shoji Nishida (Member of the House of Councillors from Kyoto) (former Seiwakai)
- Kei Satō (Member of the House of Councillors from Nara) (former Seiwakai)
- Yoshihiro Seki (Member of the House of Representatives for Hyogo 3rd district) (former Seiwakai)
- Mio Sugita (Member of the House of Representatives for Chugoku PR block) (former Seiwakai)
- Junji Suzuki (Member of the House of Representatives for Aichi 7th district; Former Minister for Internal Affairs and Communications) (former Seiwakai)
- Shuichi Takatori (Member of the House of Representatives for Hokuriku-Shinetsu PR block) (former Seiwakai)
- Tomu Tanigawa (Member of the House of Representatives for Kinki PR block) (former Seiwakai)
- Kenta Wakabayashi (Member of the Representatives for Nagano 1st district) (former Seiwakai)
- Hiroshi Yamada (Member of the House of Councillors from National PR block) (former Seiwakai)

Number of recommenders by former factions

Candidates	Shigeru Ishiba	Sanae Takaichi	Shinjiro Koizumi	Yoshimasa Hayashi	Takayuki Kobayashi	Toshimitsu Motegi	Yoko Kamikawa	Taro Kono	Katsunobu Kato
Heisei Kenkyūkai	1	0	0	0	0	14	1	1	6
Kinmirai Seiji Kenkyūkai	1	0	0	0	2	0	0	0	1
Kōchikai	0	0	2	15	1	0	5	0	0
Seiwa Seisaku Kenkyūkai	0	14	1	1	4	3	2	0	4
Shikōkai	0	2	1	0	4	2	9	18	1
Shisuikai	4	2	2	0	5	0	2	1	5
Suigetsukai	7	0	0	0	0	0	0	0	0
No faction	7	2	14	4	4	1	1	0	3

=== Endorsements ===
Endorsements of Yoshimasa Hayashi

Cabinet-level officials

- Hiroshi Moriya (Deputy Chief Cabinet Secretary, 2023–present; Member of the House of Councillors from Yamanashi) (former Kōchikai)
- Yasushi Kaneko (Minister for Internal Affairs and Communications, 2021–2022; Member of the House of Representatives for Kumamoto 4th district) (former Kōchikai)
- Takumi Nemoto (Minister of Health, Labour and Welfare, 2018–2019; Minister for Reconstruction, 2012–2014; Member of the House of Representatives for Fukushima 2nd district) (former Kōchikai)
- Yoshihiko Isozaki (Deputy Chief Cabinet Secretary, 2021–2023; Member of the House of Councillors from Kagawa) (former Kōchikai)
- Masatoshi Ishida (Minister for Internal Affairs and Communications, 2018–2019; Member of the House of Representatives for Wakayama 2nd district) (former Kōchikai)
- Takuya Hirai (Minister for Digital Transformation, 2021; Member of the House of Representatives for Shikoku PR block) (former Kōchikai)
- Yasuhiro Hanashi (Minister of Justice, 2022; Member of the House of Representatives for Ibaraki 3rd district) (former Kōchikai)
- Itsunori Onodera (Minister of Defense, 2017-2018, 2012-2014; Member of the House of Representatives for Miyagi 6th district) (former Kōchikai)
- Minoru Terada (Minister for Internal Affairs and Communications, 2022; Member of the House of Representatives for Hiroshima 5th district) (former Kōchikai)
- Yoichi Miyazawa (Minister of Economy, Trade and Industry, 2014–2015; Member of the House of Representatives for Hiroshima 7th district, 2000–2009; Member of the House of Councillors from Hiroshima, 2010–present) (former Kōchikai)

Members of the National Diet

- Seishi Baba (Member of the House of Councillors from Kumamoto) (former Kōchikai)
- Shōgo Azemoto (Member of the House of Representatives for Chūgoku PR block) (former Kōchikai)
- Shunpei Kaneko (Member of the House of Representatives for Gifu 4th district) (former Kōchikai)
- Shinya Fujiki (Member of the House of Councillors from National PR block) (former Kōchikai)
- Akira Yoshii (Member of the House of Councillors from Kyoto) (former Kōchikai)
- Satoshi Fujimaru (Member of the House of Representatives for Fukuoka 7th district) (former Kōchikai)
- Rintaro Ishibashi (Member of the House of Representatives for Chūgoku PR block) (former Kōchikai)
- Shunsuke Takei (Member of the House of Representatives for Kyushu PR block) (former Kōchikai)
- Shoji Nishida (Member of the House of Representatives for Ishikawa 3rd district) (former Kōchikai)
- Konosuke Kokuba (Member of the House of Representatives for Kyushu PR block) (former Kōchikai)
- Masaji Matsuyama (Member of the House of Councillors from Fukuoka) (former Kōchikai)
- Yuichiro Koga (Member of the House of Councillors from Nagasaki) (former Kōchikai)
- Masataka Ishihara (Member of the House of Representatives for Tōkai PR block) (former Kōchikai)
- Hokuto Hoshi (Member of the House of Councillors from Fukushima) (no faction)
Endorsements of Shigeru Ishiba

Cabinet-level officials

- Katsuei Hirasawa (Minister of Reconstruction 2020–2021; Member of the House of Representatives for Tokyo 17th district) (former Shisuikai)

Members of the National Diet

- Seishirō Etō (Vice Speaker of the House of Representatives, 2009–2012; Director-General of the Japan Defense Agency, 1995–1996; Member of the House of Representatives for Ōita 2nd district)
- Toshiaki Endo (Member of the House of Representatives for Yamagata 1st district) (no faction)
- Ichirō Kanke (Member of the House of Representatives for Tohoku PR block) (former Seiwakai)
- Shinpei Matsushita (Member of the House of Councillors from Miyazaki) (Ganesha no Kai)
Endorsements of Yōko Kamikawa

Cabinet-level officials

- Shun'ichi Suzuki (Minister of Finance, 2021–present; Minister for the Tokyo Olympic and Paralympic Games, 2019, 2017–2018; Minister of the Environment 2002–2003; Member of the House of Representatives for Iwate 2nd district) (Shikōkai)
- Masayoshi Yoshino (Minister for Reconstruction, 2017–2018; Member of the House of Representatives for Fukushima 5th district) (former Seiwakai)

Members of the National Diet

- Yoshifumi Tsuge (Member of the House of Councillors from National PR block) (no faction)
Endorsements of Takayuki Kobayashi

Cabinet-level officials

- Shuhei Aoyama (Minister of State for Education, Culture, Sports, Science and Technology, 2023; Member of the House of Representatives for Tōkai PR block) (former Seiwakai)
- Akira Amari (Minister of State for Economic and Fiscal Policy, 2012–2016; Minister in charge of Economic Revitalization, 2012–2016; Minister of Economy, Trade and Industry, 2006–2008; Minister of Labour, 1998–1999; Member of the House of Representatives for Southern Kanto PR block) (Shikōkai)
- Yasukazu Hamada (Minister of Defense, 2022–2023, 2008–2009; Member of the House of Representatives for Chiba 12th district) (no faction)

Members of the National Diet

- Yoshiaki Wada (Member of the House of Representatives for Hokkaido 5th district) (former Seiwakai)
- Jun Tsushima (Member of the House of Representatives for Tohoku PR block) (Heiseiken)
- Tatsuo Fukuda (Member of the House of Representatives for Gunma 4th district) (former Seiwakai)
- Taku Otsuka (Member of the House of Representatives for Saitama 9th district) (former Seiwakai)
- Kenichi Hosoda (Member of the House of Representatives for Niigata 2nd district) (former Seiwakai)
- Yukinori Nemoto (Member of the House of Representatives for Aichi 15th district) (former Seiwakai)
- Takuo Komori (Member of the House of Representatives for Ishikawa 1st district) (former Seiwakai)
- Takashi Fujiwara (Member of the House of Representatives for Iwate 3rd district) (former Seiwakai)
- Yukiko Mori (Member of the House of Representatives for Tōkai PR block) (no faction)
- Kenji Yamada (Member of the House of Representatives for Hyōgo 7th district) (Shikōkai)
- Koichi Munekiyo (Member of the House of Representatives for Kinki PR block) (former Seiwakai)
- Shinji Yoshida (Member of the House of Representatives for Yamaguchi 4th district) (former Seiwakai)
- Masato Shimizu (Member of the House of Councillors from Gunma) (former Shisuikai)
- Tsuyohito Iwamoto (Member of the House of Councillors from Hokkaido) (former Shisuikai)
- Rui Matsukawa (Member of the House of Councillors from Osaka) (former Seiwakai)
- Hiroaki Tabata (Member of the House of Representatives for Toyama 1st district) (former Seiwakai)
- Nobuchiyo Kishi (Member of the House of Representatives for Yamaguchi 2nd district) (former Seiwakai)

Prefectural officials

- Eikei Suzuki (Governor of Mie, 2011–2021; Member of the House of Representatives for Mie 4th district, 2021–present) (former Seiwakai)
Endorsements of Shinjirō Koizumi

Cabinet-level officials

- Yoshihide Suga (Prime Minister, 2020–2021; Chief Cabinet Secretary, 2012–2020; Minister for Internal Affairs and Communications, 2006–2007; Member of the House of Representatives for Kanagawa 2nd district) (Ganesha no Kai)
- Tsutomu Sato (Minister for Internal Affairs and Communications, 2009; Chairman of the National Public Safety Commission, 2008–2009; Member of the House of Representatives for Tochigi 4th district) (no faction)
- Aiko Shimajiri (Minister of State for Okinawa and Northern Territories Affairs, 2015–2016; Member of the House of Councillors from Okinawa, 2007–2016; Member of the House of Representatives for Okinawa 3rd district) (Heiseiken)
- Manabu Sakai (Chairman of the National Public Safety Commission, 2024–2025; Deputy Chief Cabinet Secretary (Political affairs and House of Representatives), 2020–2021; Member of the House of Representatives for Kanagawa 5th district) (Ganesha no Kai)
- Ryota Takeda (Minister for Internal Affairs and Communications, 2020–2021; Chairman of the National Public Safety Commission, 2019–2020; Member of the House of Representatives for Fukuoka 11th district)
- Masanobu Ogura (Minister of State for Special Missions, Child Policy and Youth Empowerment (2023), Declining Birthrate and Gender Equality (2022–2023); Member of the House of Representatives for Tokyo 23rd district) (former Shisuikai)
- Hideki Murai (Deputy Chief Cabinet Secretary (Political affairs and House of Representatives), 2023–2024; Member of the House of Representatives for Saitama 1st district) (former Kōchikai)
- Seiko Noda (Minister-in-charge of Measures against Declining Birthrate, 2021–2022; Minister for Internal Affairs and Communications, 2017–2018; Minister of Posts and Telecommunications, 1998–1999; Member of the House of Representatives for Gifu 1st district) (no faction)
- Ken Saitō (Minister of Economy, Trade and Industry, 2023–2024; Minister of Justice, 2022–2023; Minister of Agriculture, Forestry and Fisheries, 2017–2018; Member of the House of Representatives for Chiba 7th district) (no faction)

Members of the National Diet

- Gaku Hasegawa (Member of the House of Councillors from Hokkaido) (former Seiwakai)
- Ryōsuke Kōzuki (Member of the House of Councillors from Ibaraki) (Heiseiken)
- Hideki Miyauchi (Member of the House of Representatives for Fukuoka 4th district) (former Shisuikai)
- Jiro Kimura (Member of the House of Representatives for Aomori 3rd district) (former Seiwakai)
- Kazuyuki Nakane (Member of the House of Representatives for Northern Kanto PR block) (former Seiwakai)
- Kentarō Uesugi (Member of the House of Representatives for Tohoku PR block) (former Seiwakai)
- Jiro Hatoyama (Member of the House of Representatives for Fukuoka 6th district) (former Shisuikai)
- Hidehiro Mitani (Member of the House of Representatives for Southern Kanto PR block) (Ganesha no Kai)
- Daisuke Nishino (Member of the House of Representatives for Kumamoto 2nd district) (no faction)
- Tomohiro Yamamoto (Member of the House of Representatives for Southern Kanto PR block) (Ganesha no Kai)
- Hisayuki Fujii (Member of the House of Representatives for Hyōgo 4th district) (Ganesha no Kai)
- Kentaro Asahi (Member of the House of Councillors from Tokyo) (no faction)
- Hideto Kawasaki (Member of the House of Representatives for Mie 2nd district) (no faction)

Former endorsements of Seiko Noda

- Toshitaka Ōoka (Member of the House of Representatives for Shiga 1st district) (former Shisuikai)
- Takuma Miyaji (Member of the House of Representatives for Kyushu PR block) (former Kinmirai Seiji Kenkyūkai)

Former endorsements of Ken Saitō

- Seiji Kihara (Former Special Advisor to the Prime Minister, 2023; Deputy Chief Cabinet Secretary (Political affairs and House of Representatives), 2021–2023; Member of the House of Representatives for Tokyo 20th district) (former Kōchikai)
- Yoshihisa Furukawa (Minister of Justice, 2021–2022; Member of the House of Representatives for Miyazaki 3rd district) (Heiseiken)
- Takao Ochi (Member of the House of Representatives for Tokyo 6th district) (former Seiwakai)
- Junichi Kanda (Member of the House of Representatives for Aomori 2nd district) (former Kōchikai)
Endorsements of Taro Kono

Cabinet-level officials

- Tarō Asō, (Prime Minister, 2008–2009; Deputy Prime Minister, 2012–2021; Minister of Finance, 2012–2021; Minister for Foreign Affairs, 2005–2007; Minister for Internal Affairs and Communications, 2003–2005; Member of the House of Representatives for Fukuoka 8th district) (Shikōkai)
- Tetsushi Sakamoto (Minister of Agriculture, Forestry and Fisheries, 2023–2024; Minister in charge of Measures Against Loneliness and Isolation, 2021; Member of the House of Representatives for Kumamoto 3rd district) (former Kinmirai Seiji Kenkyūkai)

Members of the National Diet

- Hiroyuki Yoshiie (Member of the House of Councillors from National PR block, 2007–2012; Member of the House of Representatives for Southern Kanto PR block) (former Seiwakai)
- Norihiro Nakayama (Member of the House of Representatives for Southern Kanto PR block) (Shikōkai)
- Takakazu Seto (Member of the House of Representatives for Shikoku PR block) (Shikōkai)

Prefectural officials

- Ichita Yamamoto (Governor of Gunma, 2019–present; Member of the House of Councillors from Gunma, 1995–2019) (no faction)
Endorsements of Toshimitsu Motegi

Cabinet-level officials

- Hiromichi Watanabe (Minister of Reconstruction, 2022–2023, 2018–2019; Member of the House of Representatives for Chiba 6th district) (Heiseiken)
- Kenji Wakamiya (Minister of State for Consumer Affairs and Food Safety, 2021–2022; Minister of State for "Cool Japan" and Minister of State for the Intellectual Property Strategy, 2021–2022;Minister for the World Expo 2025, 2021–2022; Member of the House of Representatives for Tokyo PR block) (Heiseiken)

Members of the National Diet

- Hajime Funada (Member of the House of Representatives for Tochigi 1st district) (Heiseiken)
- Hiroshi Hiraguchi (Member of the House of Representatives for Hiroshima 2nd district) (Heiseiken)
- Shinichi Nakatani (Member of the House of Representatives for Yamanashi 1st district) (Heiseiken)
- Toshiro Ino (Member of the House of Representatives for Gunma 2nd district) (Heiseiken)
- Atsushi Nonaka (Member of the House of Representatives for Northern Kanto PR block) (Heiseiken)
- Takako Suzuki (Member of the House of Representatives for Hokkaido PR block) (Heiseiken)
- Kiyoshi Igarashi (Member of the House of Representatives for Northern Kanto PR block) (Heiseiken)
- Susumu Yamaguchi (Member of the House of Representatives for Saitama 10th district) (Heiseiken)
Endorsements of Sanae Takaichi

Members of the National Diet

- Akimasa Ishikawa (Member of the House of Representatives for Northern Kanto PR block) (no faction)
- Kiyoshi Odawara (Member of the House of Representatives for Tokyo 21st district) (former Seiwakai)
- Hideyuki Tanaka (Member of the House of Representatives for Kinki PR block) (Ganesha no Kai)
- Kei Takagi (Member of the House of Representatives for Tokyo PR block) (former Seiwakai)
- Masanao Ozaki (Member of the House of Representatives for Kōchi 2nd district) (former Shisuikai)
- Ryusho Kato (Member of the House of Representatives for Nagasaki 2nd district) (former Seiwakai)
- Motome Takisawa (Member of the House of Councillors from Aomori) (Shikōkai)

Declined

Endorsements of Fumio Kishida

Cabinet-level officials

- Yoshimasa Hayashi (Chief Cabinet Secretary, 2023–present; Minister for Foreign Affairs, 2021–2023; Minister of Education, Culture, Sports, Science and Technology, 2017–2018; Minister of Agriculture, Forestry and Fisheries, 2012–2014; Minister of State for Economic and Fiscal Policy, 2009; Minister of Defense, 2008; Member of the House of Councillors from Yamaguchi, 1995–2021; Member of the House of Representatives for Yamaguchi 3rd district, 2021–present) (entered race after Kishida withdrew)
- Seiji Kihara (Former Special Advisor to the Prime Minister, 2023; Deputy Chief Cabinet Secretary (Political affairs and House of Representatives), 2021–2023; Member of the House of Representatives for Tokyo 20th district) (endorsed Ken Saitō after Kishida withdrew and later endorsed Koizumi after Saitō withdrew)
Endorsements of Ken Saito

Cabinet-level officials

- Yūko Obuchi (Minister of Economy, Trade and Industry, 2014; Member of the House of Representatives for Gunma 5th district) (Heiseiken)
- Seiji Kihara (Former Special Advisor to the Prime Minister, 2023; Deputy Chief Cabinet Secretary (Political affairs and House of Representatives), 2021–2023; Member of the House of Representatives for Tokyo 20th district) (Endorsed Koizumi after Saitō withdrew)

== Opinion polls ==
=== Polling ===
LOESS curve of the polling for the 2024 LDP leadership election with a 7-day average since the election was called. Note that the approval ratings of Liberal Democratic Party Supporters are omitted from the graph.

(Figures in parentheses are approval ratings of Liberal Democratic Party supporters)

Fieldwork date	Polling firm	Sample size	Shigeru Ishiba	Sanae Takaichi	Shinjirō Koizumi	Yoshimasa Hayashi	Takayuki Kobayashi	Toshimitsu Motegi	Yōko Kamikawa	Taro Kono	Katsunobu Katō	Others	NOT/ UD/NA
27 Sep 2024	LDP presidential election	695,536	(29.12)	(29.30)	(16.63)	(7.50)	(5.10)	(3.75)	(4.73)	(2.15)	(1.72)	–	–
21–22 Sep 2024	ANN	1,012	31	15	20	3	3	2	5	5	1	–	15
21 Sep 2024	SSRC	2,044	26 (24)	17 (29)	14 (23)	3	3	1	5	4	1	–	26 (24)
20–21 Sep 2024	Nippon TV/JX	1,007	(31)	(28)	(14)	(5)	(6)	(2)	(6)	(2)	(1)	–	(5)
15–16 Sep 2024	Kyodo News	N/A	(23.7)	(27.7)	(19.1)	(6.3)	(5.2)	(1.8)	(5.1)	(3.8)	(1.7)	–	(5.6)
14–15 Sep 2024	go2senkyo/JX	992	31	16.7	17	4.5	3.1	1.7	7	3.6	0.6	–	14.6
14–15 Sep 2024	Sankei/FNN	1,012	25.6 (24.1)	12.5 (16.3)	21.9 (29.4)	3.5 (3.8)	3 (3.6)	1.6 (3)	5.5 (3.6)	4.6 (5.2)	0.2 (0.3)	–	21.6 (10.7)
14–15 Sep 2024	Yomiuri/NNN	1,500	(26)	(25)	(16)	(5)	(6)	(2)	(6)	(3)	(1)	–	(9)
14–15 Sep 2024	Asahi	1,070	32	17	24	4	3	1	3	3	0	–	13
13–15 Sep 2024	Yomiuri/NNN	1,040	27	13	21	2	2	2	5	6	1	–	20 (Note: None of these: 8%; Don't know: 12%)
13–15 Sep 2024	Nikkei/TV Tokyo	902	26	16	20	5	3	2	6	5	1	–	16
12 Sep 2024	Nippon TV/JX	1,022	(25)	(22)	(19)	(5)	(5)	(3)	(9)	(3)	(1)	–	(9)
12 Sep 2024	Nomination period closes. Official campaign period begins.												
7–8 Sep 2024	JNN	1,011	23.1 (24.1)	9.2 (11.7)	28.5 (34.5)	1.8 (2.8)	2.8 (2.6)	2.1 (2.9)	6.1 (5.9)	6.4 (6.7)	0.5 (0.8)	3.6 (2) (Note: Shigeharu Aoyama: 2,4% (0.9%); Ken Saitō: 0.6% (0.5%); Seiko Noda: 0.6% (0%))	15.9 (6)
6–9 Sep 2024	Jiji Press	1,170	24.2 (27.1)	8.5 (12.1)	25.5 (35.6)	1.4	2.9	1.4	2.1	4.9 (3.6)	0.3	–	27.8 (Note: None of these: 12.0%; Don't know: 15.8%)
6–8 Sep 2024	NHK	1,220	27.8	9.3	22.6	1.9	3.6	1.7	4.2	6.1	0.7	3.8 (Note: Shigeharu Aoyama: 2,4%; Seiko Noda: 1.4%)	18.3 (Note: None of these: 6.5%)
3–4 Sep 2024	Nippon TV/JX	1,019 (Note: Among members or allies of LDP.)	(28)	(17)	(18)	(4)	(5)	(2)	(7)	(3)	(2)	(4) (Note: Shigeharu Aoyama: (3%); Seiko Noda: (1%))	(10)
31 Aug – 1 Sep 2024	go2senkyo	1,000	16.5 (28.6)	7.5 (11.8)	11.6 (17.6)	0.7	1.3	0.7	2.9	4.3	0.2	3.7 (Note: Shigeharu Aoyama: 2.7%; Seiko Noda: 0.7%; Ken Saitō: 0.3%)	50.6
24–25 Aug 2024	SSRC	1,752	23	11	16	2	5	1	5	5	–	5 (Note: Others: 3%; Seiko Noda: 2%; Ken Saitō: 0%)	28
24–25 Aug 2024	Asahi	1,058	21	8	21	1	5	2	6	6	1	1 (Note: Seiko Noda: 1%)	28 (Note: None of these: 22%)
24–25 Aug 2024	ANN	1,015	27	9	23	1	6	1	6	6	–	1	19
24–25 Aug 2024	Mainichi	950	29	13	16	1	7	1	6	5	1	1 (Note: Ken Saitō: 1%)	20 (Note: None of these: 12%; Undecided and Don't know: 7%; No answer: 1%)
24–25 Aug 2024	Sankei/FNN	N/A	21.6	10.8	22.4	1.0	3.6	1.3	4.2	7.7	0.6	3.1 (Note: Shigeharu Aoyama: 1.6%; Seiko Noda: 1.3%; Ken Saitō: 0.2%)	23.7
23–25 Aug 2024	Yomiuri/NNN	1,056	22	10	20	1	5	2	6	7	1	1 (Note: Seiko Noda: 1%)	25 (Note: None of these: 10%)
21–22 Aug 2024	Nikkei/TV Tokyo	N/A	18	11	23	2	8	1	6	7	1	2 (Note: Seiko Noda: 1%; Ken Saitō: 1%)	–
17–19 Aug 2024	Kyodo News	1,064	25.3	10.1	19.6	–	3.7	–	7.6	9.7	–	–	–
17–18 Aug 2024	go2senkyo/JX	987	29.1	12.6	14.7	–	5.7	2.0	6.2	5.8	–	7.6 (Note: Seiko Noda: 2.4%; Others: 5.2%)	16.4

=== Hypothetical polling ===
The following polls feature Fumio Kishida, who was then speculated to run for re-election for the Liberal Democratic party leadership before deciding against entering the race.

Hypothetical polling with Fumio Kishida as a candidate

LOESS curve of the polling for the 2024 LDP leadership election with a 7-day average.

Fieldwork date	Polling firm	Sample size	Shigeru Ishiba	Shinjirō Koizumi	Taro Kono	Sanae Takaichi	Yoshihide Suga	Yōko Kamikawa	Fumio Kishida	Seiko Noda	Toshimitsu Motegi	Yoshimasa Hayashi	Katsunobu Katō	Others	NOT/ UD/NA
19 Aug 2024	LDP presidential election is called for 27 September.														
14 Aug 2024	Fumio Kishida announces he will not seek re-election as President of the LDP.														
3–4 Aug 2024	JNN	1,010	23.1	14.5	7.1	7	4.8	6.9	6.4	0.7	0.9	0.4	0.8	0.8 (Note: Takayuki Kobayashi: 0.8%)	26.6
26–28 Jul 2024	Nikkei/TV Tokyo	792	24	15	5	8	5	6	6	2	1	2	–	4 (Note: Yūko Obuchi: 1%; Takayuki Kobayashi: 1%)	24
20–21 Jul 2024	Sankei/FNN	1,033	24.7	12.1	7.0	7.5	5.4	4.8	4.1	1.4	0.9	1.2	0.4	0.1 (Note: Takayuki Kobayashi: 0.1%)	30.4 (Note: None of these: 21.8%)
20–21 Jul 2024	Kyodo News	1,035	28.4	12.7	9	10.4	–	8.2	7.5	1.1	2.5	0.7	0.7	1.1 (Note: Takayuki Kobayashi: 0.7%; Another MP: 0.4%)	17.7
20–21 Jul 2024	SSRC	2,044	17	12	4	7	7	5	6	–	–	–	–	9 (Note: Another government politician: 2%; An opposition politician: 7%)	33
19–21 Jul 2024	Yomiuri/NNN	1,031	25	15	8	6	6	4	6	2	1	1	–	1 (Note: Takayuki Kobayashi: 1%)	25 (Note: None of these: 13%)
13–14 Jul 2024	ANN	1,012	27	18	6	6	4	6	4	2	1	–	1	1	24
6–7 Jul 2024	JNN	1,021	24	16.6	9.3	5.8	5.8	4.9	2.7	1.4	0.9	1.5	0.8	0.8 (Note: Takayuki Kobayashi: 0.8%)	25.5
22–23 Jun 2024	SSRC	2,043	18	11	5	5	7	5	5	–	–	–	–	9 (Note: Another government politician: 3%; An opposition politician: 6%)	35
22–23 Jun 2024	Mainichi	1,057	20	7	5	9	6	8	5	–	1	–	–	–	39
22–23 Jun 2024	Kyodo News	1,056	26.2	12.1	7.8	6.8	–	7.8	6.6	2.4	2.4	1	0.9	1.9	25.1
21–23 Jun 2024	Yomiuri/NNN	1,023	23	15	6	7	8	6	6	3	1	1	1	1 (Note: Takayuki Kobayashi: 1%)	22 (Note: None of these: 11%)
15–16 Jun 2024	Senkyo.com/JX	984	23.2	9.9	4.8	8.5	–	8.6	7.8	–	0.9	2.4	–	8	25.9
15–16 Jun 2024	Sankei/FNN	1,013	16.4	14.6	8.4	6.3	5.8	5.6	4.3	0.9	0.4	0.4	0.3	1.7 (Note: Kenta Izumi (CDP): 1.7%)	35.3 (Note: None of these: 27.7%)
15–16 Jun 2024	ANN	1,026	23	18	8	6	5	7	3	3	1	–	–	1	25
18–19 May 2024	ANN	1,045	23	18	7	6	5	9	4	1	1	–	–	1	25
17–19 May 2024	Yomiuri/NNN	1,033	22	16	10	7	6	7	4	1	2	2	–	2 (Note: Yūko Obuchi: 2%)	21 (Note: None of these: 11%)
4–5 May 2024	JNN	1,013	24.2	14.1	8.4	6.1	7	7.8	4.5	1.8	0.3	0.9	1.4	8.2	15.3
13–14 Apr 2024	ANN	1,037	21	18	8	6	5	9	5	2	1	–	–	1	24
22–24 Mar 2024	Yomiuri/NNN	1,020	22	15	8	5	6	9	7	1	1	1	–	2 (Note: Yūko Obuchi: 2%)	23 (Note: None of these: 15%)
16–17 Mar 2024	ANN	1,031	22	18	9	6	5	11	4	2	1	–	–	1	21
16–17 Mar 2024	SSRC	2,044	17	11	6	6	6	8	3	–	–	–	–	8 (Note: Another government politician: 2%; An opposition politician: 6%)	35
8–11 Mar 2024	Jiji Press	1,160	18.6	12.1	6.4	4.7	5.7	5.9	2.3	0.9	0.4	1.1	0.1	1.4 (Note: Yūko Obuchi: 0.7%; Yasutoshi Nishimura: 0.4%; Kōichi Hagiuda: 0.3%)	40.4
9–10 Mar 2024	Kyodo News	1,043	22.2	15.4	7.9	8.3	–	10.8	4.9	1.8	0.9	0.5	–	2.8 (Note: Yasutoshi Nishimura: 0.3%; Another MP: 2.5%)	24.5
24–25 Feb 2024	ANN	1,034	23	17	9	6	4	11	2	3	1	–	–	1 (Note: Yasutoshi Nishimura: 1%)	34
17–18 Feb 2024	SSRC	2,043	17	10	7	6	7	10	3	–	–	–	–	7 (Note: Another government politician: 2%; An opposition politician: 5%)	33
17–18 Feb 2024	Mainichi	1,024	25	9	7	9	–	12	1	2	1	–	–	–	34
16–18 Feb 2024	Yomiuri/NNN	1,083	21	17	10	6	4	8	4	2	2	–	–	2 (Note: Yūko Obuchi: 2%)	12
26–28 Jan 2024	Nikkei/TV Tokyo	969	22	15	10	7	7	5	3	2	2	3	–	3 (Note: Yūko Obuchi: 2%; Another MP: 1%)	17
21 Jan 2024	SSRC	2,052	17	12	7	7	9	5	4	–	–	–	5	3 (Note: Taro Yamamoto (Reiwa): 3%)	32
20–21 Jan 2024	ANN	1,007	23	19	9	7	6	5	4	2	1	–	–	2 (Note: Yasutoshi Nishimura: 1%; Another MP: 1%)	24
16–17 Dec 2023	ANN	1,011	23	19	11	7	4	6	3	1	1	–	–	2 (Note: Yasutoshi Nishimura: 1%; Another MP: 1%)	23
16–17 Dec 2023	Kyodo News	1,018	25.7	15.9	13.2	6.2	–	5.9	5.2	2.4	1.3	3.9	–	2.7 (Note: Yasutoshi Nishimura: 1.2%; Another MP: 1.5%)	17.6
15–17 Dec 2023	Yomiuri/NNN	1,069	20	17	12	7	8	4	4	2	2	2	–	1 (Note: Yūko Obuchi: 1%)	23 (Note: None of these: 11%; No answer: 12%)
15–16 Dec 2023	Nikkei/TV Tokyo	729	21	19	12	7	5	4	3	1	1	3	–	1 (Note: Yūko Obuchi: 1%; Another MP: 0%)	23
8–11 Dec 2023	Jiji Press	2,000	15	16	8.8	5	6.2	3.1	1.6	–	–	–	–	1	40.3
25–26 Nov 2023	ANN	1,015	17	19	13	7	6	4	4	2	1	–	–	1 (Note: Yasutoshi Nishimura: 1%; Another MP: 0%)	26
24–26 Nov 2023	Nikkei/TV Tokyo	869	16	15	13	9	5	2	4	2	1	3	–	3 (Note: Yūko Obuchi: 2%; Kōichi Hagiuda: 1%)	26
18–19 Nov 2023	Asahi	1,086	15	16	13	8	–	–	7	–	1	1	–	–	36
11–12 Nov 2023	Sankei/FNN	N/A	18.2	16	11.9	5.4	4.2	4.3	2.5	–	–	–	–	5.2	32.3
3–5 Nov 2023	Kyodo News	1,040	20.2	14.1	14.2	10	–	–	5.7	3.1	2.3	2.4	–	5.8 (Note: Yūko Obuchi: 2.3%; Yasutoshi Nishimura: 2.1%; Another MP: 1.4%)	22.2
23–24 Sep 2023	ANN	1,018	18	15	14	5	7	–	5	3	3	–	–	3 (Note: Yasutoshi Nishimura: 2%; Another MP: 1%)	22
19–20 Aug 2023	Kyodo News	1,049	18.5	11.9	13.5	7	–	–	10.2	1.6	2	3.7	–	3 (Note: Yasutoshi Nishimura: 1.4%; Another MP: 1.6%)	28.6
8–9 Jul 2023	ANN	1,023	15	16	13	5	10	–	10	2	–	–	–	3 (Note: Yasutoshi Nishimura: 2%; Another MP: 1%)	27
4 Jun 2023	SSRC	1,502	4	4	9	4	4	–	19	–	–	–	–	7 (Note: Taro Yamamoto (Reiwa): 2%; Hirofumi Yoshimura (Ishin): 2%; Tōru Hashimoto (Ishin): 1%; Yuriko Koike (Ind.): 1%; Yuichiro Tamaki (DPFP): 1%)	49
3–4 Dec 2022	JNN	1,227	11	–	19	5	7	–	6	2	2	1	–	–	39
19–20 Nov 2022	Mainichi/SSRC	3,069	5.9	4	14.7	4.7	4.4	–	15.8	–	–	–	–	6.4 (Note: Tōru Hashimoto (Ishin): 2.1%; Hirofumi Yoshimura (Ishin): 1.9%; Taro Yamamoto (Reiwa): 1.4%)	17
17–18 Sep 2022	SSRC	642	5.1	2.1	13.6	5.1	3.4	–	10.3	–	–	–	–	8 (Note: Tōru Hashimoto (Ishin): 4.7%; Taro Yamamoto (Reiwa): 3.3%)	20.9

=== Preferred outcome ===
Fieldwork date	Polling firm	Sample size	Kishida continues as PM	Election of new PM	Und. / no answer	Lead
22–23 Jun 2024	SSRC	2,043	8	63	29	34

== Results ==
Full results by round
Candidate	First Round								Runoff					
Candidate	Diet members		Party members				Total points		Diet members		Prefectural chapters		Total points	
Candidate	Votes	%	Popular votes	%	Allocated votes	%	Total votes	%	Votes	%	Votes	%	Total votes	%
Shigeru Ishiba 当	46	12.53%	202,558	29.12%	108	29.35%	154	20.95%	189	52.21%	26	55.32%	215	52.57%
Sanae Takaichi	72	19.62%	203,802	29.30%	109	29.62%	181	24.63%	173	47.79%	21	44.68%	194	47.43%
Shinjirō Koizumi	75	20.44%	115,633	16.63%	61	16.58%	136	18.50%	Eliminated					
Yoshimasa Hayashi	38	10.35%	52,149	7.50%	27	7.34%	65	8.84%	Eliminated					
Takayuki Kobayashi	41	11.17%	35,501	5.10%	19	5.16%	60	8.16%	Eliminated					
Toshimitsu Motegi	34	9.26%	26,081	3.75%	13	3.53%	47	6.39%	Eliminated					
Yōko Kamikawa	23	6.27%	32,899	4.73%	17	4.62%	40	5.44%	Eliminated					
Taro Kono	22	5.99%	14,971	2.15%	8	2.17%	30	4.08%	Eliminated					
Katsunobu Katō	16	4.36%	11,942	1.72%	6	1.63%	22	2.99%	Eliminated					
Total	367	100.00%	695,536	100.00%	368	100.00%	735	100.00%	362	100.00%	47	100.00%	409	100.00%
Valid votes	367	100.00%	695,536	99.57%	368	100.00%	735	100.00%	362	98.64%	47	100.00%	409	98.79%
Invalid and blank votes	0	0.00%	3,009	0.43%	0	0.00%	0	0.00%	5	1.36%	0	0.00%	5	1.21%
Turnout	367	99.73%	698,545	66.16%	368	100.00%	735	99.86%	367	99.73%	47	100.00%	414	99.76%
Registered voters	368	100.00%	1,055,839	100.00%	368	100.00%	736	100.00%	368	100.00%	47	100.00%	415	100.00%

=== Results of Party Members' Votes by Prefectures (First Round) ===
Results of Party Members' Votes by Prefectures
Prefectures	Sanae Takaichi		Shigeru Ishiba		Shinjirō Koizumi		Yoshimasa Hayashi		Takayuki Kobayashi		Yōko Kamikawa		Toshimitsu Motegi		Taro Kono		Katsunobu Kato	
Prefectures	Votes	%	Votes	%	Votes	%	Votes	%	Votes	%	Votes	%	Votes	%	Votes	%	Votes	%
Aichi	13,121	36.2%	10,030	27.6%	5,564	15.3%	1,442	4.0%	2,952	8.1%	1,083	3.0%	488	1.3%	1,385	3.8%	211	0.6%
Akita	1,517	20.1%	2,934	38.9%	1,895	25.1%	454	6.0%	140	1.9%	168	2.2%	40	0.5%	92	1.2%	299	4.0%
Aomori	1,721	22.1%	2,290	29.5%	1,811	23.3%	688	8.8%	726	9.3%	342	4.4%	75	1.0%	86	1.1%	36	0.5%
Chiba	5,917	29.6%	5,184	25.9%	2,808	14.0%	448	2.2%	4,473	22.4%	460	2.3%	287	1.4%	331	1.7%	99	0.5%
Ehime	3,601	29.3%	3,780	30.8%	2,464	20.1%	695	5.7%	1,004	8.2%	342	2.8%	169	1.4%	160	1.3%	72	0.6%
Fukui	2,767	38.5%	2,326	32.4%	941	13.1%	312	4.3%	262	3.6%	258	3.6%	165	2.3%	109	1.5%	39	0.5%
Fukuoka	6,967	36.1%	4,171	21.6%	3,094	16.0%	2,823	14.6%	864	4.5%	537	2.8%	178	0.9%	538	2.8%	129	0.7%
Fukushima	2,116	21.9%	3,452	35.7%	2,090	21.6%	805	8.3%	314	3.2%	466	4.8%	142	1.5%	95	1.0%	183	1.9%
Gifu	6,484	26.4%	7,389	30.1%	5,042	20.6%	2,271	9.3%	740	3.0%	839	3.4%	937	3.8%	694	2.8%	126	0.5%
Gunma	3,732	22.3%	5,212	31.2%	2,430	14.6%	625	3.7%	1,753	10.5%	462	2.8%	2,007	12.0%	376	2.3%	101	0.6%
Hiroshima	4,454	25.0%	4,073	22.9%	2,286	12.8%	4,197	23.6%	622	3.5%	953	5.4%	921	5.2%	143	0.8%	160	0.9%
Hokkaido	7,651	30.9%	7,663	31.0%	3,555	14.4%	1,842	7.4%	1,766	7.1%	548	2.2%	1,183	4.8%	392	1.6%	147	0.6%
Hyōgo	8,166	43.2%	5,639	29.8%	2,033	10.8%	1,205	6.4%	630	3.3%	685	3.6%	177	0.9%	234	1.2%	140	0.7%
Ibaraki	5,520	21.5%	9,523	37.0%	4,076	15.9%	1,114	4.3%	743	2.9%	848	3.3%	3,231	12.6%	553	2.2%	101	0.4%
Ishikawa	4,250	30.1%	3,562	25.3%	3,124	22.2%	1,556	11.0%	708	5.0%	481	3.4%	151	1.1%	177	1.3%	92	0.7%
Iwate	1,182	22.6%	1,811	34.7%	1,022	19.6%	492	9.4%	218	4.2%	354	6.8%	48	0.9%	64	1.2%	31	0.6%
Kagawa	3,965	35.8%	2,727	24.6%	1,768	16.0%	694	6.3%	1,268	11.4%	313	2.8%	104	0.9%	149	1.3%	90	0.8%
Kagoshima	2,936	25.1%	4,118	35.3%	2,976	25.5%	661	5.7%	359	3.1%	328	2.8%	101	0.9%	134	1.1%	65	0.6%
Kanagawa	11,272	26.6%	7,890	18.6%	15,082	35.6%	925	2.2%	1,523	3.6%	993	2.3%	255	0.6%	4,315	10.2%	159	0.4%
Kōchi	1,908	36.0%	2,009	37.9%	797	15.0%	245	4.6%	103	1.9%	129	2.4%	29	0.5%	61	1.2%	21	0.4%
Kumamoto	2,760	22.5%	3,212	26.2%	2,587	21.1%	1,994	16.3%	282	2.3%	264	2.2%	796	6.5%	308	2.5%	66	0.5%
Kyoto	3,643	39.6%	2,454	26.7%	1,323	14.4%	656	7.1%	585	6.4%	237	2.6%	108	1.2%	98	1.1%	88	1.0%
Mie	2,389	27.6%	1,898	21.9%	1,334	15.4%	1,356	15.6%	1,245	14.4%	194	2.2%	141	1.6%	71	0.8%	38	0.4%
Miyagi	2,778	30.3%	2,443	26.7%	1,725	18.8%	1,316	14.4%	246	2.7%	302	3.3%	163	1.8%	143	1.6%	39	0.4%
Miyazaki	2,133	25.5%	2,595	31.0%	1,951	23.3%	1,160	13.9%	142	1.7%	188	2.2%	79	0.9%	63	0.8%	52	0.6%
Nagano	3,289	32.6%	2,788	27.6%	1,325	13.1%	1,162	11.5%	654	6.5%	566	5.6%	113	1.1%	129	1.3%	73	0.7%
Nagasaki	3,787	30.1%	3,607	28.6%	1,955	15.5%	2,122	16.8%	303	2.4%	347	2.8%	163	1.3%	131	1.0%	186	1.5%
Nara	6,005	78.1%	775	10.1%	320	4.2%	136	1.8%	259	3.4%	115	1.5%	22	0.3%	35	0.5%	17	0.2%
Niigata	4,713	28.6%	4,597	27.9%	3,501	21.2%	1,051	6.4%	1,704	10.3%	482	2.9%	135	0.8%	212	1.3%	89	0.5%
Ōita	3,290	31.7%	4,148	39.9%	1,573	15.1%	579	5.6%	272	2.6%	309	3.0%	90	0.9%	95	0.9%	37	0.4%
Okayama	3,038	22.0%	2,870	20.8%	989	7.2%	120	0.9%	212	1.5%	236	1.7%	50	0.4%	95	0.7%	6,181	44.8%
Okinawa	1,055	21.3%	1,476	29.8%	1,271	25.6%	400	8.1%	97	2.0%	109	2.2%	190	3.8%	29	0.6%	330	6.7%
Osaka	9,985	45.5%	5,156	23.5%	2,482	11.3%	1,353	6.2%	925	4.2%	861	3.9%	425	1.9%	455	2.1%	288	1.3%
Saga	1,782	26.9%	2,387	36.1%	1,129	17.1%	387	5.8%	454	6.9%	144	2.2%	219	3.3%	71	1.1%	44	0.7%
Saitama	8,033	31.2%	7,532	29.3%	4,649	18.1%	1,459	5.7%	934	3.6%	1,328	5.2%	1,273	4.9%	337	1.3%	191	0.7%
Shiga	2,175	31.6%	2,259	32.8%	1,211	17.6%	529	7.7%	199	2.9%	194	2.8%	66	1.0%	76	1.1%	180	2.6%
Shimane	1,379	16.0%	5,332	62.0%	593	6.9%	227	2.6%	126	1.5%	167	1.9%	100	1.2%	36	0.4%	637	7.4%
Shizuoka	5,085	22.2%	5,303	23.1%	2,019	8.8%	202	0.9%	397	1.7%	9,601	41.9%	95	0.4%	176	0.8%	57	0.2%
Tochigi	1,961	14.8%	2,048	15.5%	1,422	10.8%	108	0.8%	154	1.2%	163	1.2%	7,224	54.6%	62	0.5%	82	0.6%
Tokushima	1,464	27.9%	1,682	32.1%	834	15.9%	75	1.4%	141	2.7%	939	17.9%	46	0.9%	40	0.8%	27	0.5%
Tokyo	19,915	34.3%	16,913	29.2%	9,401	16.2%	2,986	5.1%	2,791	4.8%	2,623	4.5%	1,081	1.9%	1,707	2.9%	601	1.0%
Tottori	548	6.5%	7,635	90.7%	73	0.9%	21	0.2%	83	1.0%	25	0.3%	4	0.1%	11	0.1%	13	0.2%
Toyama	4,969	27.3%	7,376	40.5%	2,591	14.2%	621	3.4%	684	3.8%	628	3.4%	982	5.4%	234	1.3%	144	0.8%
Wakayama	2,462	29.5%	3,151	37.8%	1,115	13.4%	756	9.1%	574	6.9%	102	1.2%	45	0.5%	81	1.0%	56	0.7%
Yamagata	1,179	15.6%	3,345	44.4%	1,312	17.4%	579	7.7%	119	1.6%	186	2.5%	730	9.7%	60	0.8%	27	0.4%
Yamaguchi	2,647	22.4%	1,091	9.2%	634	5.4%	6,650	56.3%	491	4.2%	156	1.3%	38	0.3%	59	0.5%	40	0.3%
Yamanashi	2,091	20.6%	2,702	26.6%	1,456	14.4%	650	6.4%	260	2.6%	1,844	18.2%	1,015	10.0%	69	0.7%	58	0.6%
Total	203,802	29.3%	202,558	29.1%	115,633	16.6%	52,149	7.5%	35,501	5.1%	32,899	4,7%	26,081	3.8%	14,971	2.2%	11.942	1.7%

== Aftermath and analysis ==
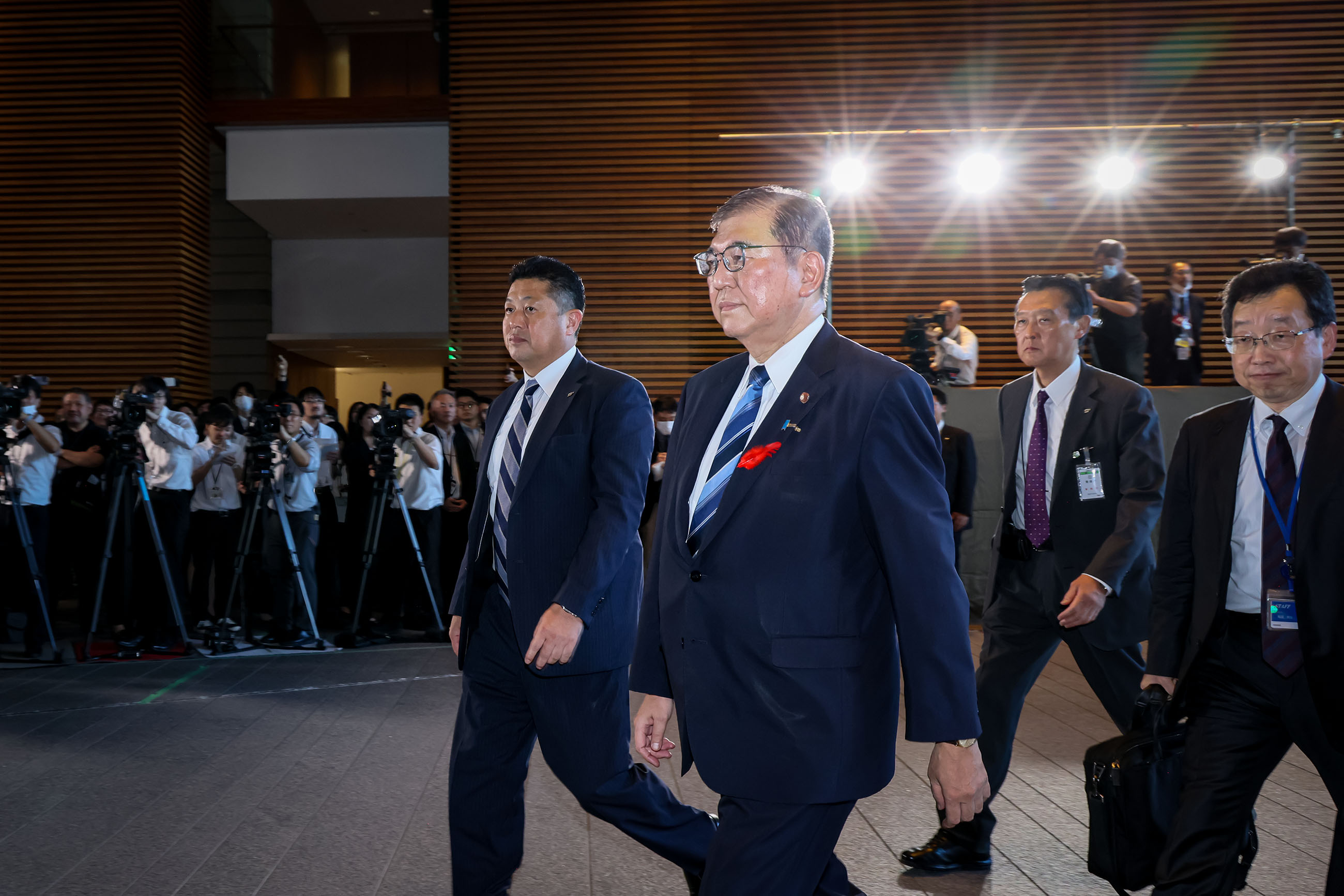
Shigeru Ishiba arrives in the Kantei upon his appointment as Prime Minitser, 1 October 2024

Ishiba's victory was described by commentators as an upset, given his previous four failed leadership election campaigns; Ishiba had difficulty attracting the votes of his fellow Diet members in past elections. Foreign policy and security issues played a major role in the campaign, which the Council on Foreign Relations argued benefited Ishiba given his defense-related pedigree. After his election, the Japanese stock market experienced a sudden drop in response to Ishiba's economic policies, which was dubbed the "Ishiba Shock" by some observers. In his speech immediately following the announcement of his victory, Ishiba repeated his campaign promise: to protect the rules, to protect Japan, and to protect the Japanese people.

The election was described as “chaotic” due to the number of candidates and the lack of many factions. Camps supporting Koizumi and Kono were disappointed that neither candidate from Kanagawa advanced to the runoff. Taxes, political reform, defense policy, and social issues were among the major topics discussed during the campaign. Kono would come in eighth place in the election, wile Koizumi came in third place behind Takaichi. The Japan Times attributed Kono's decline in popularity to dissatisfaction with policies rolled out during his term as Digital Minister, as well as fading interest in his public image. Katsunobu Katō came in last place after several of his initial recommenders voted for other candidates. The election would help further advance the name recognition of Hayashi and Koizumi, who would go on to serve in Ishiba's cabinet and run in the subsequent leadership election held one year later.

Following Ishiba's victory, it was described that he had planned on providing Koizumi a more prominent role in the LDP while Takaichi declined any cabinet positions in Ishiba's government. Ishiba would go on to appoint former Prime Minister Yoshihide Suga as vice president of the party, while promoting outgoing Vice President Taro Aso as a chief advisor, with Hiroshi Moriyama becoming secretary general of the party. The appointments were seen as Ishiba's effort to stabilize the party.

Ishiba was sworn in as the 65th Prime Minister of Japan on 1 October and immediately formed his cabinet following his appointment by the Emperor. In his first press conference from the Kantei following his inauguration, Ishiba announced he would call a snap election to be held on 27 October.

== See also ==
- 2024 Constitutional Democratic Party of Japan presidential election
