= Department of Agriculture, Fisheries and Forestry =

Department of Agriculture, Fisheries and Forestry may refer to:

- Department of Agriculture, Fisheries and Forestry (Australia)
  - Department of Agriculture, Fisheries and Forestry (Queensland)
- Department of Agriculture, Fisheries and Forestry (Isle of Man)

== See also ==
- Department of Agriculture, Forestry and Fisheries (South Africa)
- List of agriculture ministries
- List of forestry ministries
- Ministry of Agriculture, Forestry and Fisheries (disambiguation)
