= Ministry of Agriculture, Forestry and Fisheries =

Ministry of Agriculture, Forestry and Fisheries may refer to:

- Ministry of Agriculture, Forestry and Fisheries (Cambodia)
- Ministry of Agriculture, Forestry and Fisheries (Japan)
- Department of Agriculture, Forestry and Fisheries (Niue)
- Department of Agriculture, Forestry and Fisheries (South Africa)
  - Minister of Agriculture, Forestry and Fisheries (South Africa)

== See also ==
- Department of Agriculture, Fisheries and Forestry (disambiguation)
- List of agriculture ministries
- List of forestry ministries
