= Second Ishiba cabinet =

Cabinet of Japan from 2024 to 2025

- 103rd Cabinet of Japan
- 11 November 2024 – 21 October 2025
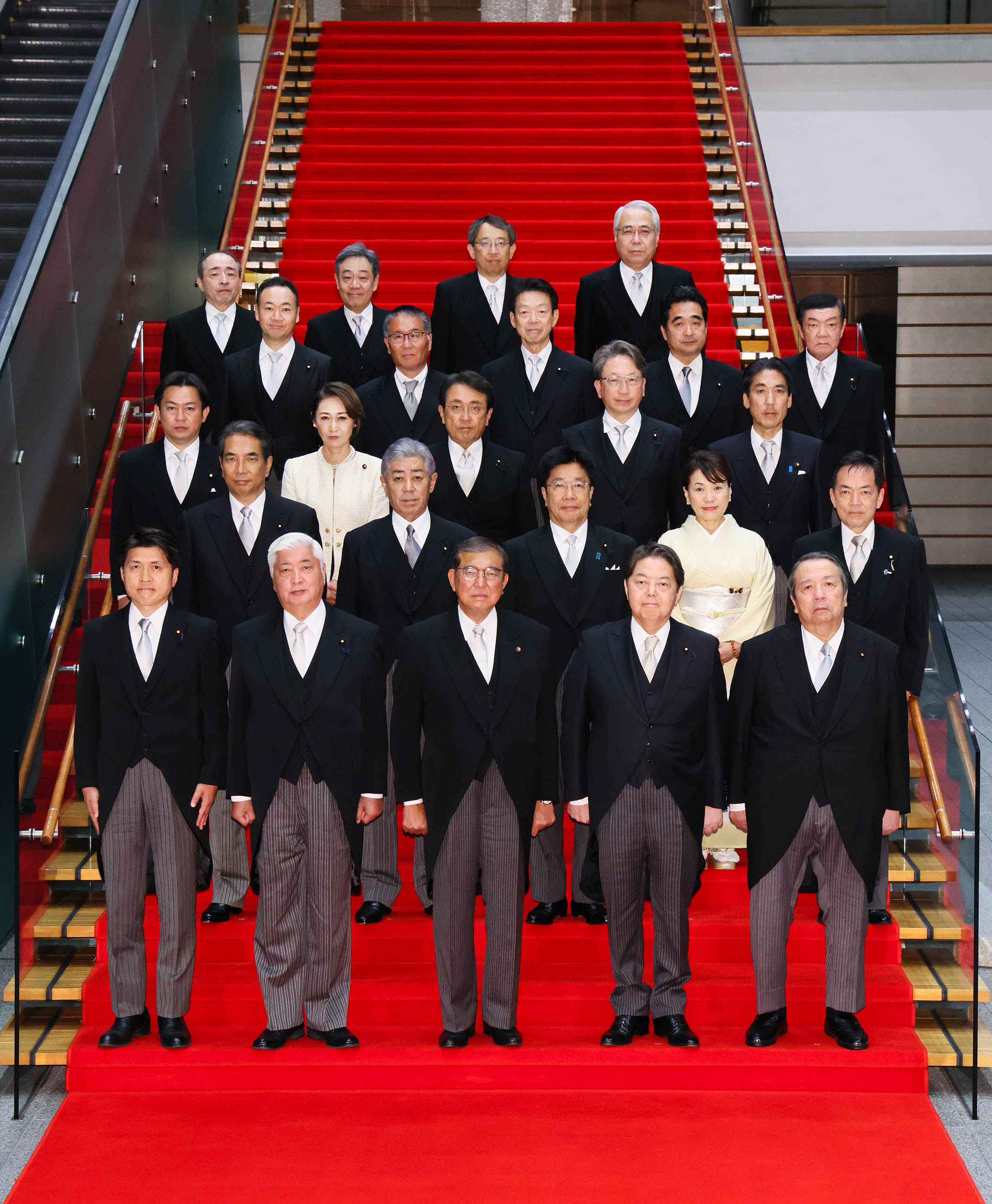
- Prime Minister Shigeru Ishiba (front row, centre) with the re-elected cabinet inside the Kantei, 11 November 2024
- Date formed: 11 November 2024
- Date dissolved: 21 October 2025

People and organisations
- Emperor: Naruhito
- Prime Minister: Shigeru Ishiba
- Prime Minister's history: Member of the HoR for Tottori 1st district (1986–present); Former Minister of Agriculture, Forestry and Fisheries (2008–2009); Former Defense Minister (2007–2008); Former Secretary-General of the Liberal Democratic Party (2012–2014)
- No. of ministers: 20
- Member party: Liberal Democratic Party; Komeito
- Status in legislature: Coalition government HoR (Lower): Minority; HoC (Upper): Minority
- Opposition cabinet: Noda Next Cabinet
- Opposition party: Constitutional Democratic Party; Japan Innovation Party; Democratic Party For the People; Japanese Communist Party; Reiwa Shinsengumi; Social Democratic Party; Sanseitō; Conservative Party
- Opposition leader: Yoshihiko Noda (CDP)

History
- Outgoing election: 2024 general election
- Legislature terms: HoR: 2024–2028 (maximum); HoC: 2019–2025 and 2022–2028
- Predecessor: Ishiba I
- Successor: Takaichi I

The Second Ishiba cabinet was the 103rd Cabinet of Japan, formed by Shigeru Ishiba on 11 November 2024, following the general election on 27 October 2024. Members of the First Ishiba Cabinet were reappointed except for Minister of Land, Infrastructure, Transport, Tourism Tetsuo Saito, who has become the Chief Representative of Komeito, Minister of Justice Hideki Makihara who lost his seat in the last general election and Minister of Agriculture, Forestry and Fisheries Yasuhiro Ozato who lost his seat in the last general election.

Following his resignation, the Second Ishiba cabinet was dissolved on 21 October 2025, and replaced with the First Takaichi cabinet.

== Election of the prime minister ==
=== House of Representatives ===
11 November 2024 215th Special National Diet Absolute majority (233/465) required
House of Representatives
Choice	Party	First Vote	Run-Off
Choice	Party	Votes	Votes
Shigeru Ishiba	Liberal Democratic Party	221 / 465	221 / 465
Yoshihiko Noda	Constitutional Democratic Party	151 / 465	160 / 465
Nobuyuki Baba	Nippon Ishin no Kai	38 / 465	
Yuichiro Tamaki	Democratic Party for the People	28 / 465	
Taro Yamamoto	Reiwa Shinsengumi	9 / 465	
Tomoko Tamura	Japanese Communist Party	8 / 465	
Shuji Kira	Independent (Yūshi no Kai)	4 / 465	
Sohei Kamiya	Sanseitō	3 / 465	
Takashi Kawamura	Conservative Party of Japan	3 / 465	
Invalid ballot			84 / 465

=== House of Councillors ===
11 November 2024 215th Special National Diet Absolute majority (122/242) required
House of Councillors
Choice	Party	Votes
Shigeru Ishiba	Liberal Democratic Party	142 / 242
Yoshihiko Noda	Constitutional Democratic Party	46 / 242
Nobuyuki Baba	Nippon Ishin no Kai	18 / 242
Yuichiro Tamaki	Democratic Party For the People	11 / 242
Tomoko Tamura	Japanese Communist Party	11 / 242
Taro Yamamoto	Reiwa Shinsengumi	5 / 242
Takae Itō	Democratic Party For the People	1 / 242
Sohei Kamiya	Sanseitō	1 / 242
Shuji Kira	Independent (Yūshi no Kai)	1 / 242
Toshimitsu Motegi	Liberal Democratic Party	1 / 242
Shinsuke Suematsu	Liberal Democratic Party	1 / 242

== Cabinet ==
Parties
Liberal Democratic
Komeito

R	Member of the House of Representatives
C	Member of the House of Councillors
B	Bureaucrat

=== Ministers ===
Citation of this table: List of Ishiba Cabinet Members

Portfolio	Portrait	Minister		Took office	Left office	Note
Cabinet ministers
Prime Minister		Shigeru Ishiba	R	11 November 2024	21 October 2025	
Minister for Internal Affairs and Communications		Seiichiro Murakami	R	11 November 2024	21 October 2025	
Minister of Justice		Keisuke Suzuki	R	11 November 2024	21 October 2025	First cabinet appointment
Minister for Foreign Affairs		Takeshi Iwaya	R	11 November 2024	21 October 2025	
Minister of Finance; Minister of State for Financial Services; Minister in charge of Overcoming Deflation		Katsunobu Katō	R	11 November 2024	21 October 2025	
Minister of Education, Culture, Sports, Science and Technology		Toshiko Abe	R	11 November 2024	21 October 2025	
Minister of Health, Labour and Welfare		Takamaro Fukuoka	C	11 November 2024	21 October 2025	
Minister of Agriculture, Forestry and Fisheries		Taku Etō	R	11 November 2024	21 May 2025	Resigned after a political gaffe.
Minister of Agriculture, Forestry and Fisheries		Shinjirō Koizumi	R	21 May 2025	21 October 2025	
Minister of Economy, Trade and Industry; Minister in charge of the Response to the Economic Impact Caused by the Nuclear Accident; Minister for Green Transformation; Minister in charge of Industrial Competitiveness; Minister of State for the Nuclear Damage Compensation and Decommissioning Facilitation Corporation		Yoji Muto	R	11 November 2024	21 October 2025	
Minister of Land, Infrastructure, Transport and Tourism; Minister in charge of Water Cycle Policy; Minister for the World Horticultural Exhibition Yokohama 2027		Hiromasa Nakano	R	11 November 2024	21 October 2025	First cabinet appointment
Minister of the Environment; Minister of State for Nuclear Emergency Preparedness		Keiichiro Asao	C	11 November 2024	21 October 2025	
Minister of Defense		Gen Nakatani	R	11 November 2024	21 October 2025	
Chief Cabinet Secretary; Minister in charge of Mitigating the Impact of U.S. Forces in Okinawa; Minister in charge of the Abduction Issue		Yoshimasa Hayashi	R	11 November 2024	21 October 2025	
Minister for Digital Transformation; Minister in charge of Digital Administrative and Fiscal Reforms; Minister in charge of Administrative Reform; Minister in charge of the National Civil Service Reform; Minister of State for Regulatory Reform		Masaaki Taira	R	11 November 2024	21 October 2025	
Minister of Reconstruction; Minister in charge of Comprehensive Policy Coordination for Revival from the Nuclear Accident at Fukushima		Tadahiko Ito	R	11 November 2024	21 October 2025	
Chairman of the National Public Safety Commission; Minister in charge of Building National Resilience; Minister in charge of Territorial Issues; Minister of State for Disaster Management; Minister of State for Ocean Policy		Manabu Sakai	R	11 November 2024	21 October 2025	
Minister of State for Policies Related to Children, Measures for Declining Birthrate, Youth Empowerment, and Gender Equality; Minister of State for Promoting Cohesive and Mutual Assistance Society; Minister in charge of Women's Empowerment; Minister in charge of Cohesive Society		Junko Mihara	C	11 November 2024	21 October 2025	
Minister in charge of Economic Revitalization; Minister in charge of New Capitalism; Minister in charge of Wage Increase; Minister in charge of Startups; Minister in charge of Social Security Reform; Minister in charge of Infectious Disease Crisis Management; Minister in charge of the Preparation of Establishing the Disaster Management Agency; Minister of State for Economic and Fiscal Policy		Ryosei Akazawa	R	11 November 2024	21 October 2025	
Minister in charge of Economic Security; Minister of State for "Cool Japan" Strategy; Minister of State for Intellectual Property Strategy; Minister of State for Science and Technology Policy; Minister of State for Space Policy; Minister of State for Economic Security		Minoru Kiuchi	R	11 November 2024	21 October 2025	
Minister of State for Okinawa and Northern Territories Affairs; Minister of State for Consumer Affairs and Food Safety; Minister of State for Regional Revitalization; Minister of State for Ainu-Related Policies; Minister in charge of the Creation of New Regional Economies and Living Environments; Minister for the World Expo 2025		Yoshitaka Itō	R	11 November 2024	21 October 2025	

=== Deputy Chief Cabinet Secretary and Director-General of the Cabinet Legislation Bureau ===
Portfolio	Portrait	Name		Took office	Left office	Previous office
Deputy Chief Cabinet Secretary		Keiichiro Tachibana	R	11 November 2024	21 October 2025	
Deputy Chief Cabinet Secretary		Kazuhiko Aoki	C	11 November 2024	21 October 2025	
Deputy Chief Cabinet Secretary		Fumitoshi Satō	B	11 November 2024	21 October 2025	Vice-Minister for Internal Affairs and Communications
Director-General of the Cabinet Legislation Bureau		Nobuyuki Iwao	B	27 August 2024	21 October 2025	Public Prosecutors Office

=== Special Advisor to the Prime Minister ===
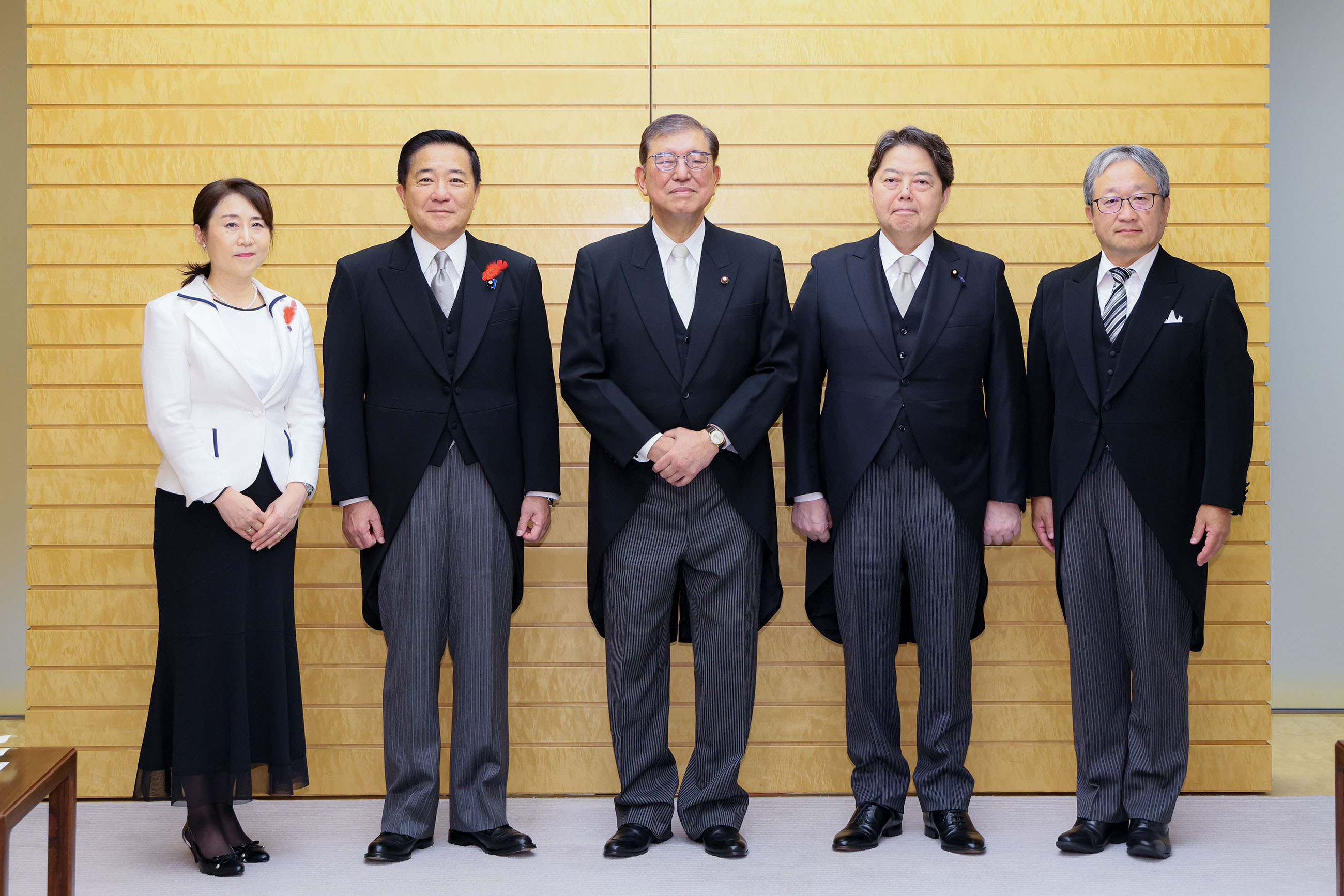
Special Advisors to the Prime Minister

Office of the Prime Minister
Portfolio	Adviser		Term	Note
Special Advisor to the Prime Minister	Akihisa Nagashima	R	1 October 2024 – 21 October 2025	
Special Advisor to the Prime Minister	Masafumi Mori	B	1 January 2022 – 21 October 2025	
Special Advisor to the Prime Minister	Wakako Yata	B	13 September 2023 – 21 October 2025	Former Member of the House of Councillors; Belonged to the Democratic Party For the People

=== State ministers ===
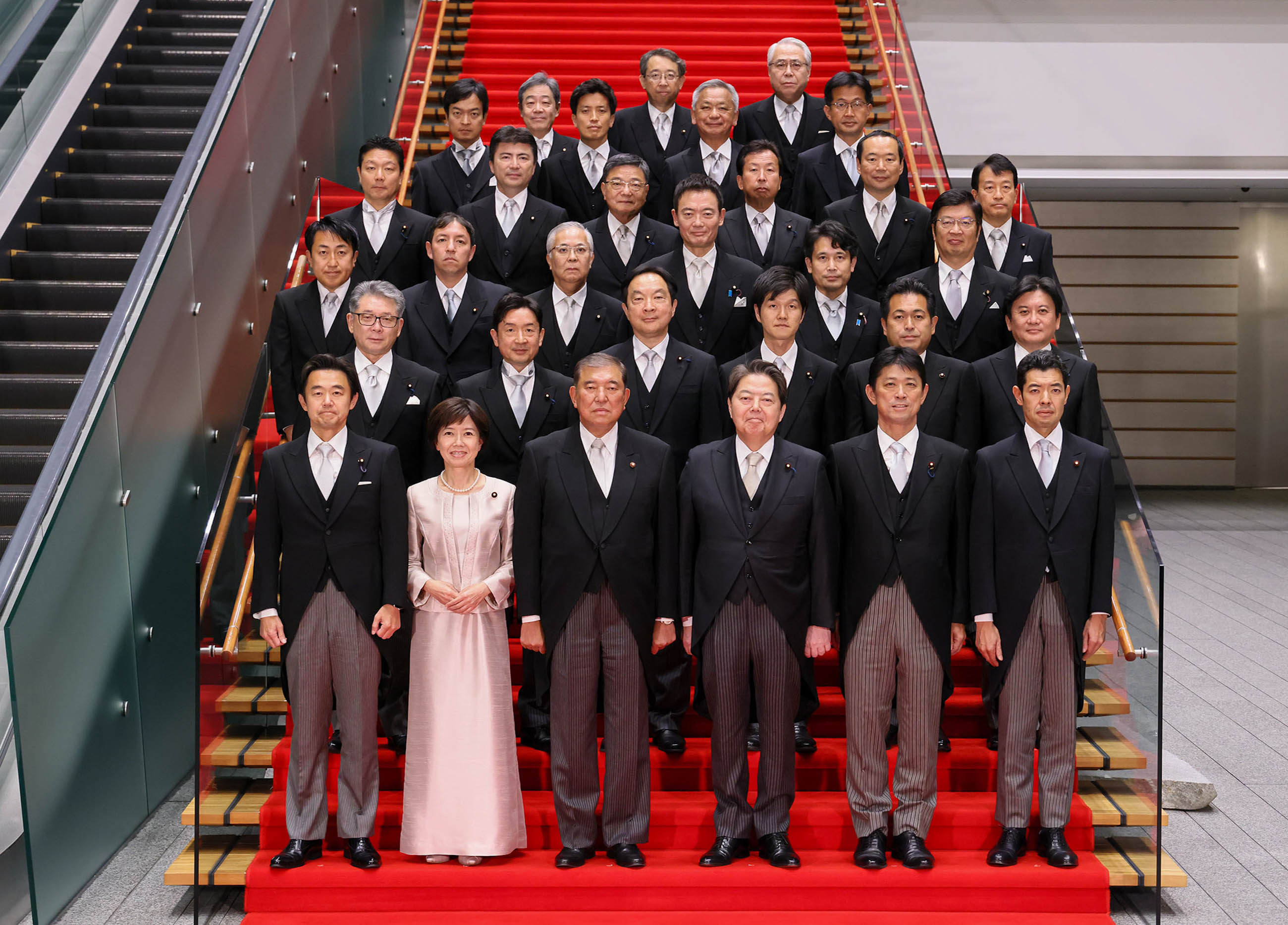
State ministers

Portfolio	State Minister		Took office	Left office	Concurrent post
State Minister for Digital Transformation	Yasushi Hosaka	R	13 November 2024	21 October 2025	State Minister of Cabinet Office
State Minister for Reconstruction	Norikazu Suzuki	R	13 November 2024	21 October 2025	
State Minister for Reconstruction	Keiichi Koshimizu	R	3 October 2024	21 October 2025	
State Minister for Reconstruction	Katsunori Takahashi	C	13 November 2024	21 October 2025	State Minister of Cabinet Office; State Minister of Land, Infrastructure, Transport and Tourism
State Minister of Cabinet Office	Yasushi Hosaka	R	13 November 2024	21 October 2025	State Minister for Digital Transformation
State Minister of Cabinet Office	Takakazu Seto	R	13 November 2024	21 October 2025	
State Minister of Cabinet Office	Kiyoto Tsuji	R	13 November 2024	21 October 2025	
State Minister of Cabinet Office	Jiro Hatoyama	R	13 November 2024	21 October 2025	
State Minister of Cabinet Office	Hiroki Ogushi	R	13 November 2024	21 October 2025	State Minister of Economy, Trade and Industry
State Minister of Cabinet Office	Yuichiro Koga	C	13 November 2024	21 October 2025	State Minister of Economy, Trade and Industry
State Minister of Cabinet Office	Katsunori Takahashi	C	13 November 2024	21 October 2025	State Minister for Reconstruction; State Minister of Land, Infrastructure, Transport and Tourism
State Minister of Cabinet Office	Hiroshi Nakada	C	13 November 2024	21 October 2025	State Minister of the Environment
State Minister of Cabinet Office	Taro Honda	R	13 November 2024	21 October 2025	State Minister of Defense
State Minister for Internal Affairs and Communications	Hiroyuki Togashi	R	13 November 2024	21 October 2025	
State Minister for Internal Affairs and Communications	Masashi Adachi	C	13 November 2024	21 October 2025	
State Minister of Justice	Masahiro Kōmura	R	13 November 2024	21 October 2025	
State Minister for Foreign Affairs	Hisayuki Fujii	R	13 November 2024	21 October 2025	
State Minister for Foreign Affairs	Takuma Miyaji	R	13 November 2024	21 October 2025	
State Minister of Finance	Hiroaki Saitō	R	3 October 2024	21 October 2025	
State Minister of Finance	Shinichi Yokoyama	C	3 October 2024	21 October 2025	
State Minister of Education, Culture, Sports, Science and Technology	Arata Takebe	R	3 October 2024	21 October 2025	
State Minister of Education, Culture, Sports, Science and Technology	Atsushi Nonaka	R	13 November 2024	21 October 2025	
State Minister of Health, Labour and Welfare	Yoko Wanibuchi	R	3 October 2024	21 October 2025	
State Minister of Health, Labour and Welfare	Hirobumi Niki	R	13 November 2024	21 October 2025	
State Minister of Agriculture, Forestry and Fisheries	Hiroyoshi Sasagawa	R	13 November 2024	21 October 2025	
State Minister of Agriculture, Forestry and Fisheries	Hirofumi Takinami	C	13 November 2024	21 October 2025	
State Minister of Economy, Trade and Industry	Masaki Ogushi	R	13 November 2024	21 October 2025	State Minister of Cabinet Office
State Minister of Economy, Trade and Industry	Yuichiro Koga	C	13 November 2024	21 October 2025	State Minister of Cabinet Office
State Minister of Land, Infrastructure, Transport and Tourism	Yasushi Furukawa	R	13 November 2024	21 October 2025	
State Minister of Land, Infrastructure, Transport and Tourism	Katsunori Takahashi	C	13 November 2024	21 October 2025	State Minister for Reconstruction; State Minister of Cabinet Office
State Minister of the Environment	Fumiaki Kobayashi	R	13 November 2024	21 October 2025	
State Minister of the Environment	Hiroshi Nakada	C	13 November 2024	21 October 2025	State Minister of Cabinet Office
State Minister of Defense	Taro Honda	R	13 November 2024	21 October 2025	State Minister of Cabinet Office

=== Parliamentary vice-ministers ===
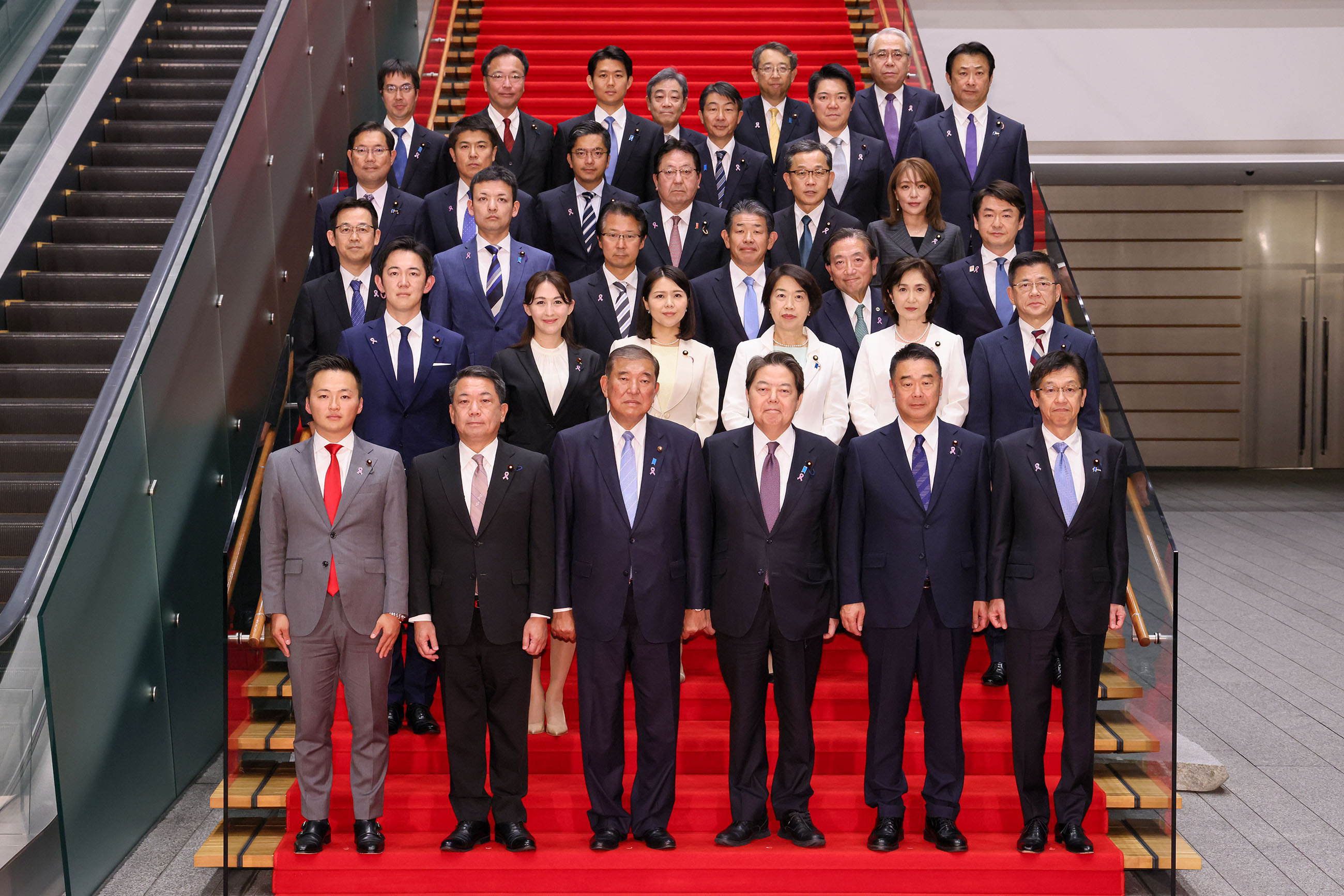
Parliamentary Vice-Ministers

Portfolio	Parliamentary Vice-Minister		Took office	Left office	Concurrent post
Parliamentary Vice-Minister for Digital Transformation	Nobuchiyo Kishi	R	13 November 2024	21 October 2025	Parliamentary Vice-Minister of Cabinet Office
Parliamentary Vice-Minister for Reconstruction	Eriko Imai	C	13 November 2024	21 October 2025	Parliamentary Vice-Minister of Cabinet Office
Parliamentary Vice-Minister for Reconstruction	Ken Akamatsu	C	13 November 2024	21 October 2025	Parliamentary Vice-Minister for Education, Culture, Sports, Science and Technology
Parliamentary Vice-Minister for Reconstruction	Shinji Takeuchi	C	3 October 2024	21 October 2025	Parliamentary Vice-Minister of Economy, Trade and Industry; Parliamentary Vice-Minister of Cabinet Office
Parliamentary Vice-Minister for Reconstruction	Isato Kunisada	R	13 November 2024	21 October 2025	Parliamentary Vice-Minister of Land, Infrastructure, Transport and Tourism; Parliamentary Vice-Minister of Cabinet Office
Parliamentary Vice-Minister of Cabinet Office	Nobuchiyo Kishi	R	13 November 2024	21 October 2025	Parliamentary Vice-Minister for Digital Transformation
Parliamentary Vice-Minister of Cabinet Office	Daisuke Nishino	R	13 November 2024	21 October 2025	
Parliamentary Vice-Minister of Cabinet Office	Rio Tomonō	C	13 November 2024	21 October 2025	
Parliamentary Vice-Minister of Cabinet Office	Eriko Imai	C	13 November 2024	21 October 2025	Parliamentary Vice-Minister for Reconstruction
Parliamentary Vice-Minister of Cabinet Office	Akiyoshi Katō	C	13 November 2024	21 October 2025	Parliamentary Vice-Minister of Economy, Trade and Industry
Parliamentary Vice-Minister of Cabinet Office	Shinji Takeuchi	C	3 October 2024	21 October 2025	Parliamentary Vice-Minister of Economy, Trade and Industry; Parliamentary Vice-Minister for Reconstruction
Parliamentary Vice-Minister of Cabinet Office	Isato Kunisada	R	13 November 2024	21 October 2025	Parliamentary Vice-Minister of Land, Infrastructure, Transport and Tourism; Parliamentary Vice-Minister for Reconstruction
Parliamentary Vice-Minister of Cabinet Office	Yasushi Katsume	R	13 November 2024	21 October 2025	Parliamentary Vice-Minister of the Environment
Parliamentary Vice-Minister of Cabinet Office	Kazuhiro Kobayashi	C	13 November 2024	21 October 2025	Parliamentary Vice-Minister of Defense
Parliamentary Vice-Minister for Internal Affairs and Communications	Hideto Kawasaki	R	13 November 2024	21 October 2025	
Parliamentary Vice-Minister for Internal Affairs and Communications	Naoki Furukawa	R	13 November 2024	21 October 2025	
Parliamentary Vice-Minister for Internal Affairs and Communications	Hideharu Hasegawa	C	13 November 2024	21 October 2025	
Parliamentary Vice-Minister of Justice	Junichi Kanda	R	13 November 2024	21 October 2025	
Parliamentary Vice-Minister for Foreign Affairs	Arfiya Eri	R	13 November 2024	21 October 2025	
Parliamentary Vice-Minister for Foreign Affairs	Hisashi Matsumoto	R	13 November 2024	21 October 2025	
Parliamentary Vice-Minister for Foreign Affairs	Akiko Ikuina	C	13 November 2024	21 October 2025	
Parliamentary Vice-Minister of Finance	Kuniyoshi Azuma	R	13 November 2024	21 October 2025	
Parliamentary Vice-Minister of Finance	Shin Tsuchida	R	13 November 2024	21 October 2025	
Parliamentary Vice-Minister of Education, Culture, Sports, Science and Technology	Yasukuni Kinjō	R	3 October 2024	21 October 2025	
Parliamentary Vice-Minister of Education, Culture, Sports, Science and Technology	Ken Akamatsu	C	13 November 2024	21 October 2025	Parliamentary Vice-Minister for Reconstruction
Parliamentary Vice-Minister of Health, Labour and Welfare	Takao Andō	R	13 November 2024	21 October 2025	
Parliamentary Vice-Minister of Health, Labour and Welfare	Shinji Yoshida	R	13 November 2024	21 October 2025	
Parliamentary Vice-Minister for Agriculture, Forestry and Fisheries	Kenichi Shōji	R	3 October 2024	21 October 2025	
Parliamentary Vice-Minister for Agriculture, Forestry and Fisheries	Sachiko Yamamoto	C	13 November 2024	21 October 2025	
Parliamentary Vice-Minister of Economy, Trade and Industry	Shinji Takeuchi	C	3 October 2024	21 October 2025	Parliamentary Vice-Minister for Reconstruction; Parliamentary Vice-Minister of Cabinet Office
Parliamentary Vice-Minister of Economy, Trade and Industry	Akiyoshi Katō	C	13 November 2024	21 October 2025	Parliamentary Vice-Minister of Cabinet Office
Parliamentary Vice-Minister of Land, Infrastructure, Transport and Tourism	Yasuhiro Takami	R	13 November 2024	21 October 2025	
Parliamentary Vice-Minister of Land, Infrastructure, Transport and Tourism	Akira Yoshii	C	13 November 2024	21 October 2025	
Parliamentary Vice-Minister of Land, Infrastructure, Transport and Tourism	Isato Kunisada	R	13 November 2024	21 October 2025	Parliamentary Vice-Minister for Reconstruction; Parliamentary Vice-Minister of Cabinet Office
Parliamentary Vice-Minister of the Environment	Kiyoshi Igarashi	R	13 November 2024	21 October 2025	
Parliamentary Vice-Minister of the Environment	Yasushi Katsume	R	13 November 2024	21 October 2025	Parliamentary Vice-Minister of Cabinet Office
Parliamentary Vice-Minister of Defense	Yōzō Kaneko	R	13 November 2024	21 October 2025	
Parliamentary Vice-Minister of Defense	Kazuhiro Kobayashi	C	13 November 2024	21 October 2025	Parliamentary Vice-Minister of Cabinet Office

Preceded by First Ishiba cabinet	Cabinet of Japan; 2024–2025	Succeeded by First Takaichi cabinet
