= First Ishiba cabinet =

102nd Cabinet of Japan (2024)

- 102nd Cabinet of Japan
- 1 October – 11 November 2024
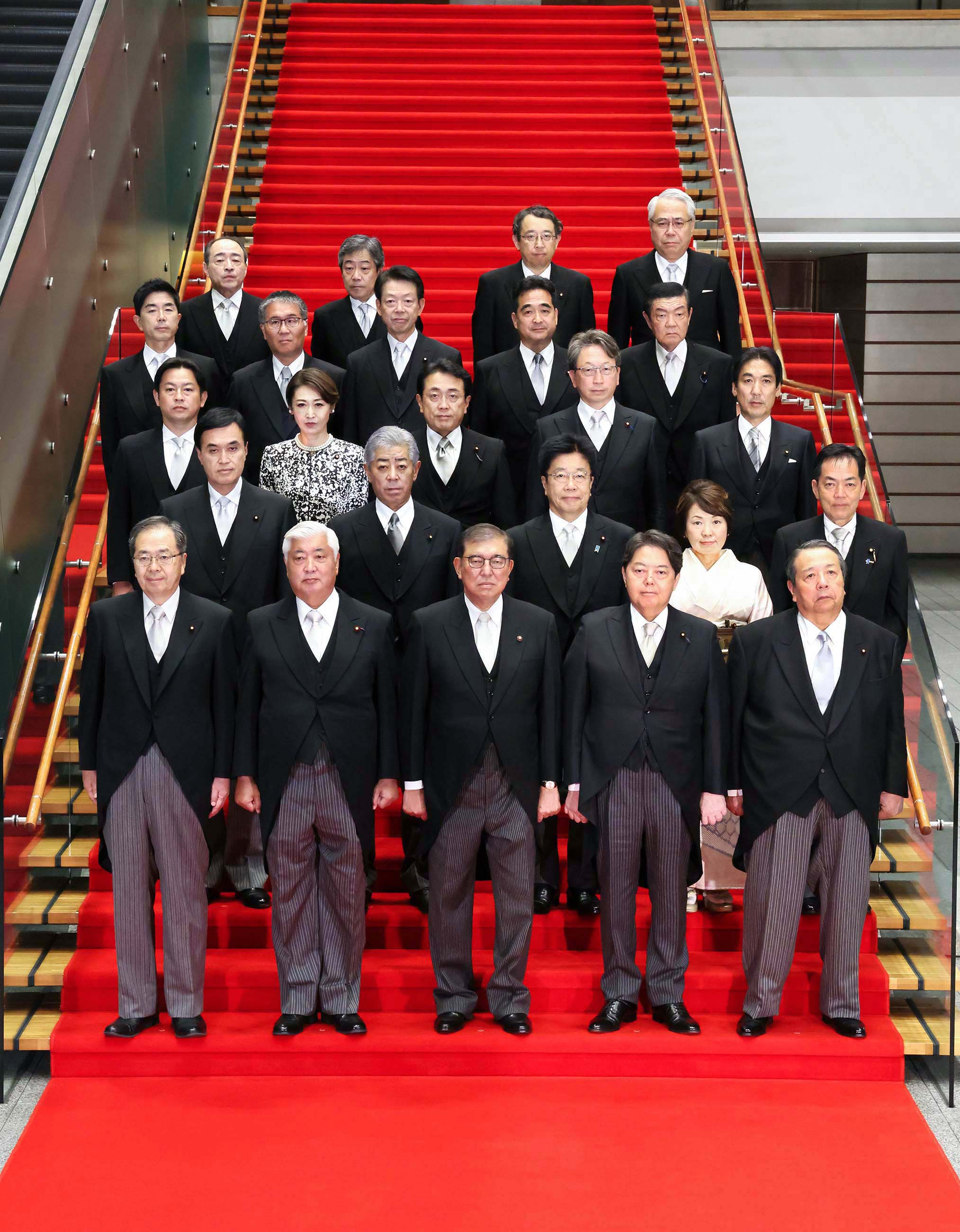
- Prime Minister Shigeru Ishiba (front row, centre) with the newly-elected cabinet inside the Kantei, October 1, 2024
- Date formed: October 1, 2024
- Date dissolved: November 11, 2024

People and organisations
- Emperor: Naruhito
- Prime Minister: Shigeru Ishiba
- Prime Minister's history: Member of the HoR for Tottori 1st district (1986–present); Former Minister of Agriculture, Forestry and Fisheries (2008–2009); Former Defense Minister (2007–2008); Former Secretary-General of the Liberal Democratic Party (2012–2014)
- No. of ministers: 20
- Member party: Liberal Democratic Party; Komeito
- Status in legislature: Coalition government HoR (Lower): Majority; HoC (Upper): Majority
- Opposition cabinet: Noda Next Cabinet
- Opposition party: Constitutional Democratic Party; Japan Innovation Party; Democratic Party For the People; Japanese Communist Party; Reiwa Shinsengumi; Free Education For All; Social Democratic Party; Sanseitō
- Opposition leader: Yoshihiko Noda (CDP)

History
- Legislature terms: HoR: 2021–2024; HoC: 2019–2025 and 2022–2028
- Predecessor: Kishida II
- Successor: Ishiba II

The First Ishiba cabinet was the 102nd Cabinet of Japan, formed by Shigeru Ishiba on 1 October 2024, following the resignation of Fumio Kishida after the Liberal Democratic Party presidential election on 27 September 2024. It has 20 members, including two women. The government was a coalition between the Liberal Democratic Party and the Komeito who controlled both the upper and lower houses of the National Diet.

After just 41 days it was replaced by the Second Ishiba cabinet following the 2024 election, making it the second shortest-serving cabinet in Japanese history, after the First Kishida cabinet.

== Election of the prime minister ==
=== House of Representatives ===
1 October 2024 214th Special National Diet Absolute majority (233/465) required
Choice	Party	Votes
Shigeru Ishiba	Liberal Democratic Party	291 / 465
Yoshihiko Noda	Constitutional Democratic Party	100 / 465
Nobuyuki Baba	Nippon Ishin no Kai	45 / 465
Tomoko Tamura	Japanese Communist Party	10 / 465
Yuichiro Tamaki	Democratic Party for the People	7 / 465
Shuji Kira	Independent (Yūshi no Kai)	5 / 465
Tarō Yamamoto	Reiwa Shinsengumi	3 / 465

=== House of Councillors ===
1 October 2024 214th Special National Diet Absolute majority (122/242) required
Choice	Party	Votes
Shigeru Ishiba	Liberal Democratic Party	143 / 242
Yoshihiko Noda	Constitutional Democratic Party	45 / 242
Nobuyuki Baba	Nippon Ishin no Kai	21 / 242
Yuichiro Tamaki	Democratic Party For the People	12 / 242
Tomoko Tamura	Japanese Communist Party	11 / 242
Tarō Yamamoto	Reiwa Shinsengumi	5 / 242
Yōichi Iha	Independent	1 / 242
Takae Itō	Democratic Party For the People	1 / 242
Sohei Kamiya	Sanseitō	1 / 242
Toshimitsu Motegi	Liberal Democratic Party	1 / 242
Sanae Takaichi	Liberal Democratic Party	1 / 242

== Cabinet ==
Parties
Liberal Democratic
Komeito

R	Member of the House of Representatives
C	Member of the House of Councillors
N	Non-Diet Member
B	Bureaucrat

=== Ministers ===
Citation of this table: List of Ishiba Cabinet Members

Portfolio	Portrait	Minister		Took office	Left office	Note
Cabinet ministers
Prime Minister		Shigeru Ishiba	R	1 October 2024	11 November 2024	
Minister for Internal Affairs and Communications		Seiichiro Murakami	R	1 October 2024	11 November 2024	
Minister of Justice		Hideki Makihara	R ↓ N	1 October 2024	11 November 2024	First cabinet appointment
Minister for Foreign Affairs		Takeshi Iwaya	R	1 October 2024	11 November 2024	
Minister of Finance; Minister of State for Financial Services; Minister in charge of Overcoming Deflation		Katsunobu Katō	R	1 October 2024	11 November 2024	
Minister of Education, Culture, Sports, Science and Technology		Toshiko Abe	R	1 October 2024	11 November 2024	First cabinet appointment
Minister of Health, Labour and Welfare		Takamaro Fukuoka	C	1 October 2024	11 November 2024	First cabinet appointment
Minister of Agriculture, Forestry and Fisheries		Yasuhiro Ozato	R ↓ N	1 October 2024	11 November 2024	First cabinet appointment
Minister of Economy, Trade and Industry; Minister of State for the Nuclear Damage Compensation and Decommissioning Facilitation Corporation		Yoji Muto	R	1 October 2024	11 November 2024	First cabinet appointment
Minister of Land, Infrastructure, Transport and Tourism; Minister in charge of Water Cycle Policy; Minister for the World Horticultural Exhibition Yokohama 2027		Tetsuo Saito	R	4 October 2021	11 November 2024	
Minister of the Environment; Minister of State for Nuclear Emergency Preparedness		Keiichiro Asao	C	1 October 2024	11 November 2024	First cabinet appointment
Minister of Defense		Gen Nakatani	R	1 October 2024	11 November 2024	
Chief Cabinet Secretary		Yoshimasa Hayashi	R	14 December 2023	11 November 2024	
Minister for Digital Transformation; Minister in charge of Digital Administrative and Fiscal Reforms; Minister in charge of Digital Garden City Nation Vision; Minister in charge of Administrative Reform; Minister in charge of Civil Service Reform; Minister of State for Regulatory Reform		Masaaki Taira	R	1 October 2024	11 November 2024	First cabinet appointment
Minister of Reconstruction; Minister in charge of Comprehensive Policy Coordination for Revival from the Nuclear Accident at Fukushima		Tadahiko Ito	R	1 October 2024	11 November 2024	First cabinet appointment
Chairman of the National Public Safety Commission; Minister in charge of Building National Resilience; Minister in charge of Territorial Issues; Minister of State for Disaster Management and Ocean Policy		Manabu Sakai	R	1 October 2024	11 November 2024	First cabinet appointment
Minister of State for Policies Related to Children; Minister of State for Measures for Declining Birthrate; Minister of State for Youth's Empowerment; Minister of State for Gender Equality; Minister in charge of Women's Empowerment; Minister in charge of Cohesive Society; Minister in charge of Measures for Loneliness and Isolation		Junko Mihara	C	1 October 2024	11 November 2024	First cabinet appointment
Minister in charge of Economic Revitalization; Minister in charge of New Capitalism; Minister in charge of Startups; Minister in charge of Infectious Disease Crisis Management; Minister in charge of Social Security Reform; Minister of State for Economic and Fiscal Policy		Ryosei Akazawa	R	1 October 2024	11 November 2024	First cabinet appointment
Minister in charge of Economic Security; Minister of State for "Cool Japan" Strategy; Minister of State for Intellectual Property Strategy; Minister of State for Science and Technology Policy; Minister of State for Space Policy; Minister of State for Economic Security		Minoru Kiuchi	R	1 October 2024	11 November 2024	First cabinet appointment
Minister of State for Okinawa and Northern Territories Affairs; Minister for Consumer Affairs and Food Safety; Minister of State for Regional Revitalization; Minister of State for Ainu-Related Policies; Minister for the World Expo 2025		Yoshitaka Itō	R	1 October 2024	11 November 2024	First cabinet appointment

=== Deputy Chief Cabinet Secretary and Director-General of the Cabinet Legislation Bureau ===
Portfolio	Portrait	Deputy Minister		Took office	Left office	Previous office
Deputy Chief Cabinet Secretary		Keiichiro Tachibana	R	1 October 2024	Incumbent	
Deputy Chief Cabinet Secretary		Kazuhiko Aoki	C	1 October 2024	Incumbent	
Deputy Chief Cabinet Secretary		Fumitoshi Satō	B	1 October 2024	Incumbent	Vice-Minister for Internal Affairs and Communications
Director-General of the Cabinet Legislation Bureau		Nobuyuki Iwao	B	27 August 2024	Incumbent	Public Prosecutors Office

=== Special Advisors to the Prime Minister ===
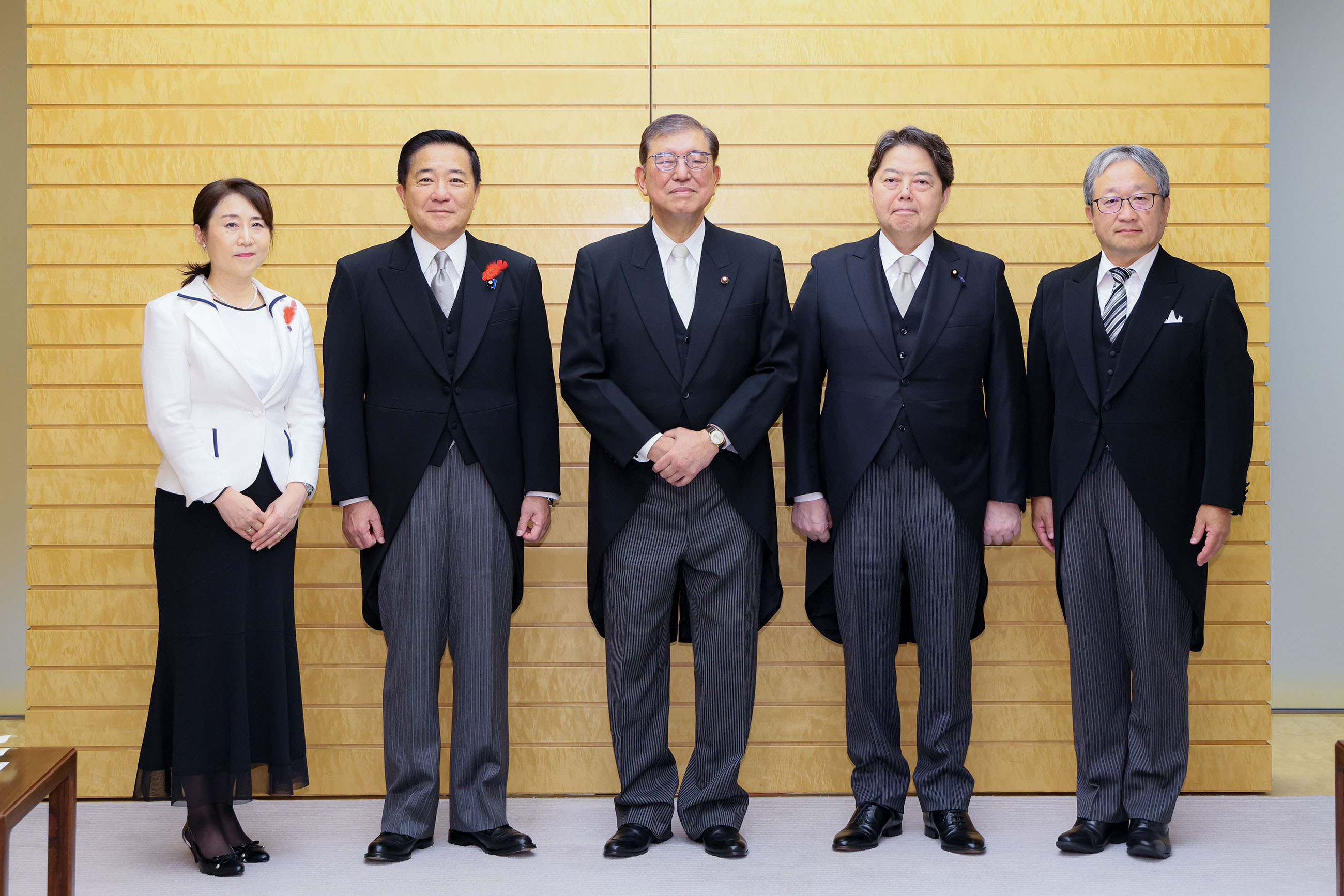
Special Advisors to the Prime Minister

Portfolio	Portrait	Advisor		Took office	Left office	Previous office
Special Advisor to the Prime Minister for important national security policies and nuclear disarmament and non-proliferation issues		Akihisa Nagashima	R	1 October 2024	Incumbent	
Special Advisor to the Prime Minister for social infrastructure development such as national resilience and reconstruction, science and technology innovation policy and other special assignments		Masafumi Mori	B	1 January 2022	Incumbent	
Special Advisor to the Prime Minister for wages and employment		Wakako Yata	B	15 September 2023	Incumbent	Member of the House of Councillors belonged to the Democratic Party for the People

=== State ministers ===
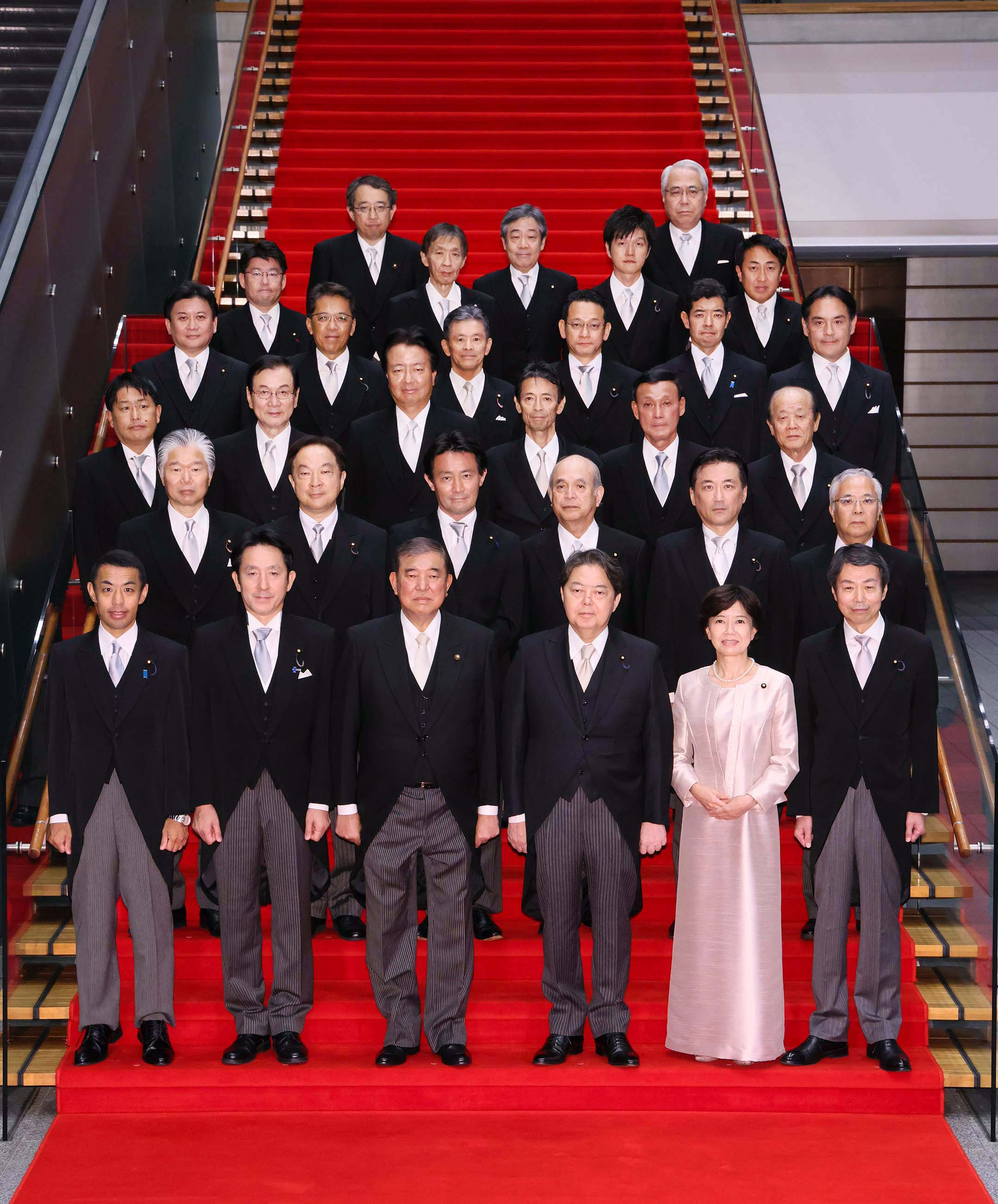
State ministers

Portfolio	State Minister		Took office	Left office	Concurrent post
State Minister for Digital Transformation	Akimasa Ishikawa	R	15 September 2023	13 November 2024	State Minister of Cabinet Office
State Minister for Reconstruction	Hirohisa Takagi	R	15 September 2023	13 November 2024	
State Minister for Reconstruction	Keiichi Koshimizu	R	3 October 2024	Incumbent	
State Minister for Reconstruction	Shigeru Dōko	C	15 September 2023	13 November 2024	State Minister of Cabinet Office; State Minister of Land, Infrastructure, Transport and Tourism
State Minister of Cabinet Office	Akimasa Ishikawa	R	15 September 2023	13 November 2024	State Minister for Digital Transformation
State Minister of Cabinet Office	Tatsunori Ibayashi	R	15 September 2023	13 November 2024	
State Minister of Cabinet Office	Shōzō Kudō	R	15 September 2023	13 November 2024	
State Minister of Cabinet Office	Atsushi Koga	R	14 December 2023	13 November 2024	
State Minister of Cabinet Office	Kazuchika Iwata	R	15 September 2023	13 November 2024	State Minister of Economy, Trade and Industry
State Minister of Cabinet Office	Ryōsuke Kōzuki	C	14 December 2023	13 November 2024	State Minister of Economy, Trade and Industry
State Minister of Cabinet Office	Shigeru Dōko	C	15 September 2023	13 November 2024	State Minister for Reconstruction; State Minister of Land, Infrastructure, Transport and Tourism
State Minister of Cabinet Office	Motome Takisawa	C	15 September 2023	13 November 2024	State Minister of the Environment
State Minister of Cabinet Office	Makoto Oniki	R	14 December 2023	13 November 2024	State Minister of Defense
State Minister for Internal Affairs and Communications	Kōichi Watanabe	R	15 September 2023	13 November 2024	
State Minister for Internal Affairs and Communications	Seishi Baba	C	15 September 2023	13 November 2024	
State Minister of Justice	Hiroaki Kadoyama	R	31 October 2023	13 November 2024	
State Minister for Foreign Affairs	Kiyoto Tsuji	R	15 September 2023	13 November 2024	
State Minister for Foreign Affairs	Yoshifumi Tsuge	C	14 December 2023	13 November 2024	
State Minister of Finance	Hiroaki Saitō	R	3 October 2024	Incumbent	
State Minister of Finance	Shinichi Yokoyama	C	3 October 2024	Incumbent	
State Minister of Education, Culture, Sports, Science and Technology	Arata Takebe	R	3 October 2024	Incumbent	
State Minister of Education, Culture, Sports, Science and Technology	Sōichiro Imaeda	R	15 September 2023	13 November 2024	
State Minister of Health, Labour and Welfare	Yoko Wanibuchi	R	3 October 2024	Incumbent	
State Minister of Health, Labour and Welfare	Masahisa Miyazaki	R	15 September 2023	13 November 2024	
State Minister of Agriculture, Forestry and Fisheries	Norikazu Suzuki	R	15 September 2023	13 November 2024	
State Minister of Agriculture, Forestry and Fisheries	Nobuhide Takemura	R	15 September 2023	13 November 2024	
State Minister of Economy, Trade and Industry	Kazuchika Iwata	R	15 September 2023	13 November 2024	State Minister of Cabinet Office
State Minister of Economy, Trade and Industry	Ryōsuke Kōzuki	C	14 December 2023	13 November 2024	State Minister of Cabinet Office
State Minister of Land, Infrastructure, Transport and Tourism	Kōnosuke Kokuba	R	15 September 2023	13 November 2024	
State Minister of Land, Infrastructure, Transport and Tourism	Shigeru Dōko	C	15 September 2023	13 November 2024	State Minister for Reconstruction; State Minister of Cabinet Office
State Minister of the Environment	Tetsuya Yagi	R	15 September 2023	13 November 2024	
State Minister of the Environment	Motome Takisawa	C	15 September 2023	13 November 2024	State Minister of Cabinet Office
State Minister of Defense	Makoto Oniki	R	14 December 2023	13 November 2024	State Minister of Cabinet Office

=== Parliamentary vice-ministers ===
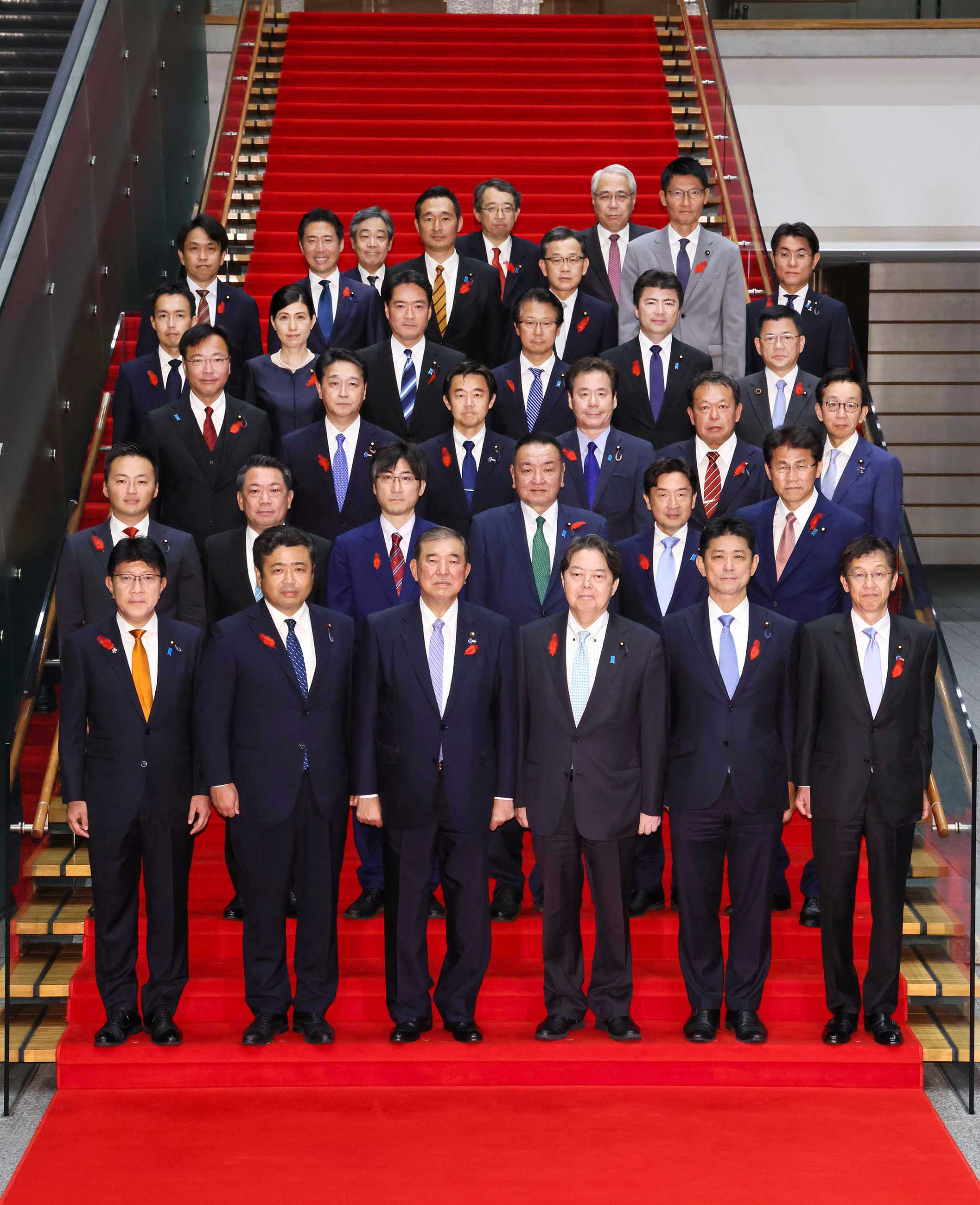
Parliamentary Vice-Ministers

Portfolio	Parliamentary Vice-Minister		Took office	Left office	Concurrent post
Parliamentary Vice-Minister for Digital Transformation	Shin Tsuchida	R	15 September 2023	Incumbent	Parliamentary Vice-Minister of Cabinet Office
Parliamentary Vice-Minister for Reconstruction	Shōjirō Hiranuma	R	15 September 2023	Incumbent	Parliamentary Vice-Minister of Cabinet Office
Parliamentary Vice-Minister for Reconstruction	Akiko Honda	C	26 October 2023	Incumbent	Parliamentary Vice-Minister for Education, Culture, Sports, Science and Technology
Parliamentary Vice-Minister for Reconstruction	Shinji Takeuchi	C	3 October 2024	Incumbent	Parliamentary Vice-Minister of Economy, Trade and Industry; Parliamentary Vice-Minister of Cabinet Office
Parliamentary Vice-Minister for Reconstruction	Masanao Ozaki	R	31 January 2024	Incumbent	Parliamentary Vice-Minister of Land, Infrastructure, Transport and Tourism; Parliamentary Vice-Minister of Cabinet Office
Parliamentary Vice-Minister of Cabinet Office	Shin Tsuchida	R	15 September 2023	Incumbent	Parliamentary Vice-Minister for Digital Transformation
Parliamentary Vice-Minister of Cabinet Office	Jun'ichi Kanda	R	15 September 2023	Incumbent	
Parliamentary Vice-Minister of Cabinet Office	Yūichirō Koga	C	15 September 2023	Incumbent	
Parliamentary Vice-Minister of Cabinet Office	Shōjirō Hiranuma	R	15 September 2023	Incumbent	Parliamentary Vice-Minister for Reconstruction
Parliamentary Vice-Minister of Cabinet Office	Taku Ishii	R	15 September 2023	Incumbent	Parliamentary Vice-Minister of Economy, Trade and Industry
Parliamentary Vice-Minister of Cabinet Office	Shinji Takeuchi	C	3 October 2024	Incumbent	Parliamentary Vice-Minister of Economy, Trade and Industry; Parliamentary Vice-Minister for Reconstruction
Parliamentary Vice-Minister of Cabinet Office	Masanao Ozaki	R	31 January 2024	Incumbent	Parliamentary Vice-Minister of Land, Infrastructure, Transport and Tourism; Parliamentary Vice-Minister for Reconstruction
Parliamentary Vice-Minister of Cabinet Office	Isato Kunisada	R	15 September 2023	Incumbent	Parliamentary Vice-Minister of the Environment
Parliamentary Vice-Minister of Cabinet Office	Shingo Miyake	C	15 September 2023	Incumbent	Parliamentary Vice-Minister of Defense
Parliamentary Vice-Minister for Internal Affairs and Communications	Shōji Nishida	R	31 January 2024	Incumbent	
Parliamentary Vice-Minister for Internal Affairs and Communications	Junji Hasegawa	R	15 September 2023	Incumbent	
Parliamentary Vice-Minister for Internal Affairs and Communications	Toshimitsu Funahashi	C	15 September 2023	Incumbent	
Parliamentary Vice-Minister of Justice	Hideyuki Nakano	R	15 September 2023	Incumbent	
Parliamentary Vice-Minister for Foreign Affairs	Masahiro Kōmura	R	15 September 2023	Incumbent	
Parliamentary Vice-Minister for Foreign Affairs	Yōichi Fukazawa	R	15 September 2023	Incumbent	
Parliamentary Vice-Minister for Foreign Affairs	Yasushi Hosaka	R	15 September 2023	Incumbent	
Parliamentary Vice-Minister of Finance	Takakazu Seto	R	15 September 2023	Incumbent	
Parliamentary Vice-Minister of Finance	Kanehiko Shindo	C	14 December 2023	Incumbent	
Parliamentary Vice-Minister of Education, Culture, Sports, Science and Technology	Yasukuni Kinjō	R	3 October 2024	Incumbent	
Parliamentary Vice-Minister of Education, Culture, Sports, Science and Technology	Akiko Honda	C	26 October 2023	Incumbent	Parliamentary Vice-Minister for Reconstruction
Parliamentary Vice-Minister of Health, Labour and Welfare	Akihisa Shiozaki	R	15 September 2023	Incumbent	
Parliamentary Vice-Minister of Health, Labour and Welfare	Yasushi Miura	C	15 September 2023	Incumbent	
Parliamentary Vice-Minister for Agriculture, Forestry and Fisheries	Kenichi Shōji	R	3 October 2024	Incumbent	
Parliamentary Vice-Minister for Agriculture, Forestry and Fisheries	Shōji Maitachi	C	15 September 2023	Incumbent	
Parliamentary Vice-Minister of Economy, Trade and Industry	Shinji Takeuchi	C	3 October 2024	Incumbent	Parliamentary Vice-Minister for Reconstruction; Parliamentary Vice-Minister of Cabinet Office
Parliamentary Vice-Minister of Economy, Trade and Industry	Taku Ishii	R	15 September 2023	Incumbent	Parliamentary Vice-Minister of Cabinet Office
Parliamentary Vice-Minister of Land, Infrastructure, Transport and Tourism	Rintaro Ishibashi	R	15 September 2023	Incumbent	
Parliamentary Vice-Minister of Land, Infrastructure, Transport and Tourism	Takashi Koyari	C	15 September 2023	Incumbent	
Parliamentary Vice-Minister of Land, Infrastructure, Transport and Tourism	Masanao Ozaki	R	31 January 2024	Incumbent	Parliamentary Vice-Minister for Reconstruction; Parliamentary Vice-Minister of Cabinet Office
Parliamentary Vice-Minister of the Environment	Kentarō Asahi	C	15 September 2023	Incumbent	
Parliamentary Vice-Minister of the Environment	Isato Kunisada	R	15 September 2023	Incumbent	Parliamentary Vice-Minister of Cabinet Office
Parliamentary Vice-Minister of Defense	Hisashi Matsumoto	R	15 September 2023	Incumbent	
Parliamentary Vice-Minister of Defense	Shingo Miyake	C	15 September 2023	Incumbent	Parliamentary Vice-Minister of Cabinet Office

Preceded by Second Kishida cabinet	Cabinet of Japan; 2024	Succeeded by Second Ishiba cabinet
