= Premiership of Shigeru Ishiba =

Period of Japanese government since 2024

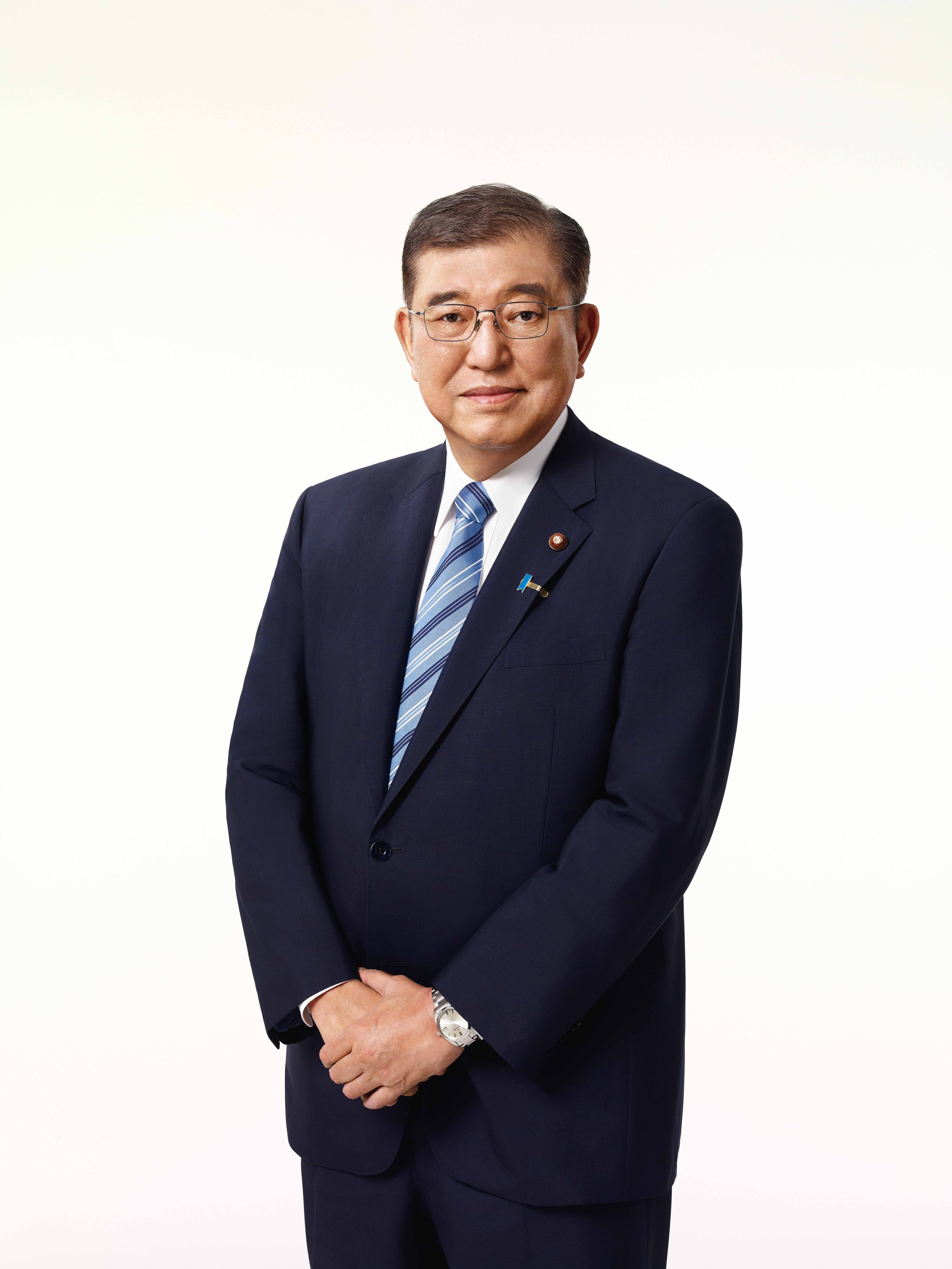
- Official portrait, 2024
- Premiership of Shigeru Ishiba; 1 October 2024 – 21 October 2025
- Monarch: Naruhito
- Cabinet: First Ishiba cabinet; Second Ishiba cabinet
- Party: Liberal Democratic
- Election: 2024
- Seat: Naikaku Sōri Daijin Kantei
- Constituency: Tottori 1st
- Emblem of the Government of Japan

Shigeru Ishiba's tenure as prime minister of Japan began on 1 October 2024 when he was officially appointed prime minister by Emperor Naruhito in a ceremony at the Tokyo Imperial Palace, succeeding Fumio Kishida.

Ishiba stood in the 2024 Liberal Democratic Party presidential election to succeed Kishida, who announced he would not seek re-election as LDP leader following record-low approval ratings from an ongoing slush fund scandal and previous controversies with the LDP's affiliation with the Unification Church. Ishiba alongside Sanae Takaichi and Shinjirō Koizumi emerged as the frontrunners to succeed him. In the leadership election on 27 September 2024, Ishiba narrowly defeated Takaichi in a second-round runoff. Ishiba's victory was described by commentators as unexpected and an upset, owing to his long history of failed leadership bids and his relative unpopularity with many LDP members of the National Diet.

As prime minister, Ishiba almost immediately announced a snap general election, where the ruling LDP and Komeito coalition lost its majority in the House of Representatives for the first time since 2009, suffering its second-worst result in party history. In the National Diet, Ishiba relied on opposition parties to pass legislation due to his coalition's minority government status. He worked with the opposition Japan Innovation Party to pass the 2025 fiscal year budget. In March 2025, he faced a scandal when it was revealed several LDP members of parliament who were elected for the first time in the 2024 election received gift certificates from the office of Ishiba in early March, causing a decline in his popularity. On foreign policy, Ishiba moved Japan economically closer to India and South Korea amidst protectionist policies being employed by the United States, while continuing to support Ukraine during the Russian invasion that began in 2022. He also saw an improvement of relations with China.

After the ruling coalition lost its majority in the House of Councillors after a poor result in the 2025 election, Ishiba began to face calls within the LDP for him to resign. Ishiba initially announced he planned to remain as prime minister, citing the need to see through tariff negotiations with the United States. After a trade deal between the two nations were announced on 23 July, it was erroneously reported that Ishiba would resign at the end of August. He eventually announced his intention to resign as party president and as prime minister in September 2025, and was succeeded as prime minister by Takaichi the next month.

== LDP presidential bid ==
Then-LDP leader and prime minister Fumio Kishida announced on 14 August 2024 that he would not seek re-election as LDP leader in the leadership election in September, effectively resigning as prime minister, following record-low approval ratings from an ongoing slush fund scandal and previous controversies with the LDP's affiliation with the Unification Church. Ishiba alongside Sanae Takaichi and Shinjirō Koizumi emerged as the frontrunners to succeed him. In the leadership election on 27 September 2024, Ishiba narrowly defeated Takaichi in a second-round runoff, winning a total of 215 votes (52.57%) from 189 parliamentary members and 26 prefectural chapters, making him the new LDP leader and prime minister–designate; the election was dubbed "Ishibamania" by the foreign media.

Ishiba's victory was described by commentators as unexpected and an upset, owing to his long history of failed leadership bids and his relative unpopularity with many LDP members of the National Diet. After his election, the Japanese stock market experienced a sudden drop in response to Ishiba's economic policies, which was named "Ishiba Shock". Three days after the LDP presidential election, the new party officials under Ishiba were inaugurated. Ishiba appointed former Prime Minister Yoshihide Suga vice president of the party, while the outgoing Vice President Tarō Asō was made chief advisor, and Hiroshi Moriyama became secretary general. Shun'ichi Suzuki was made chairman of the General Council after Takaichi declined the post. Itsunori Onodera was made chairman of the Policy Research Council and Shinjiro Koizumi chairman of the Election Strategy Committee. The appointments were seen as emphasizing stability in the party.

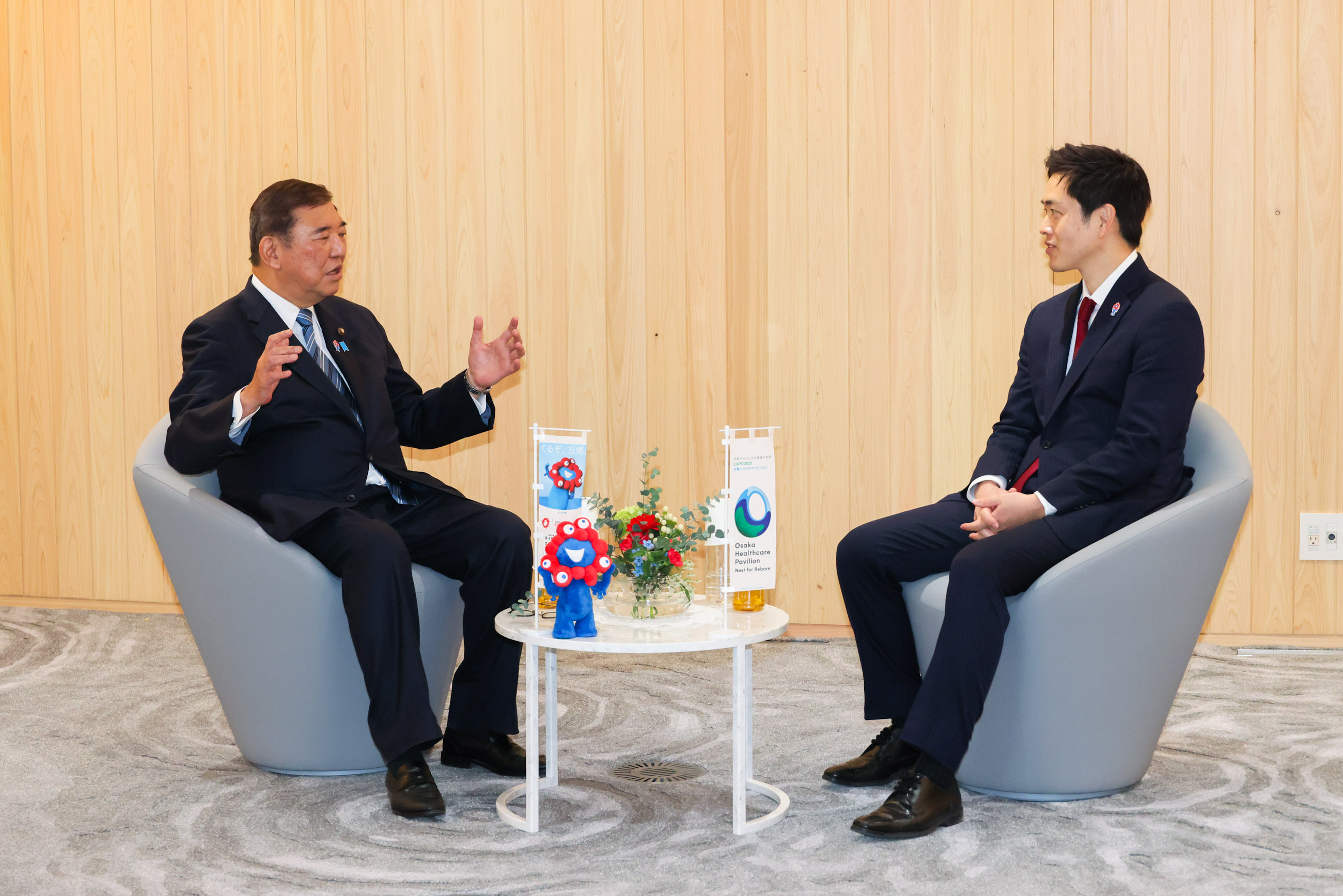
Ishiba with Osaka Governor Hirofumi Yoshimura in January 2025

On 30 September, Ishiba announced his plans to dissolve the House of Representatives on 9 October and called for snap general election to be held on 27 October 2024. This decision, which was announced before he was elected Prime Minister by the Diet, drew criticism from opposition parties as it did not allow time for a debate at a budget committee meeting prior to the House's dissolution. Despite this resistance, the Lower House voted in favor of closing the extraordinary Diet session on 9 October.

== Premiership ==
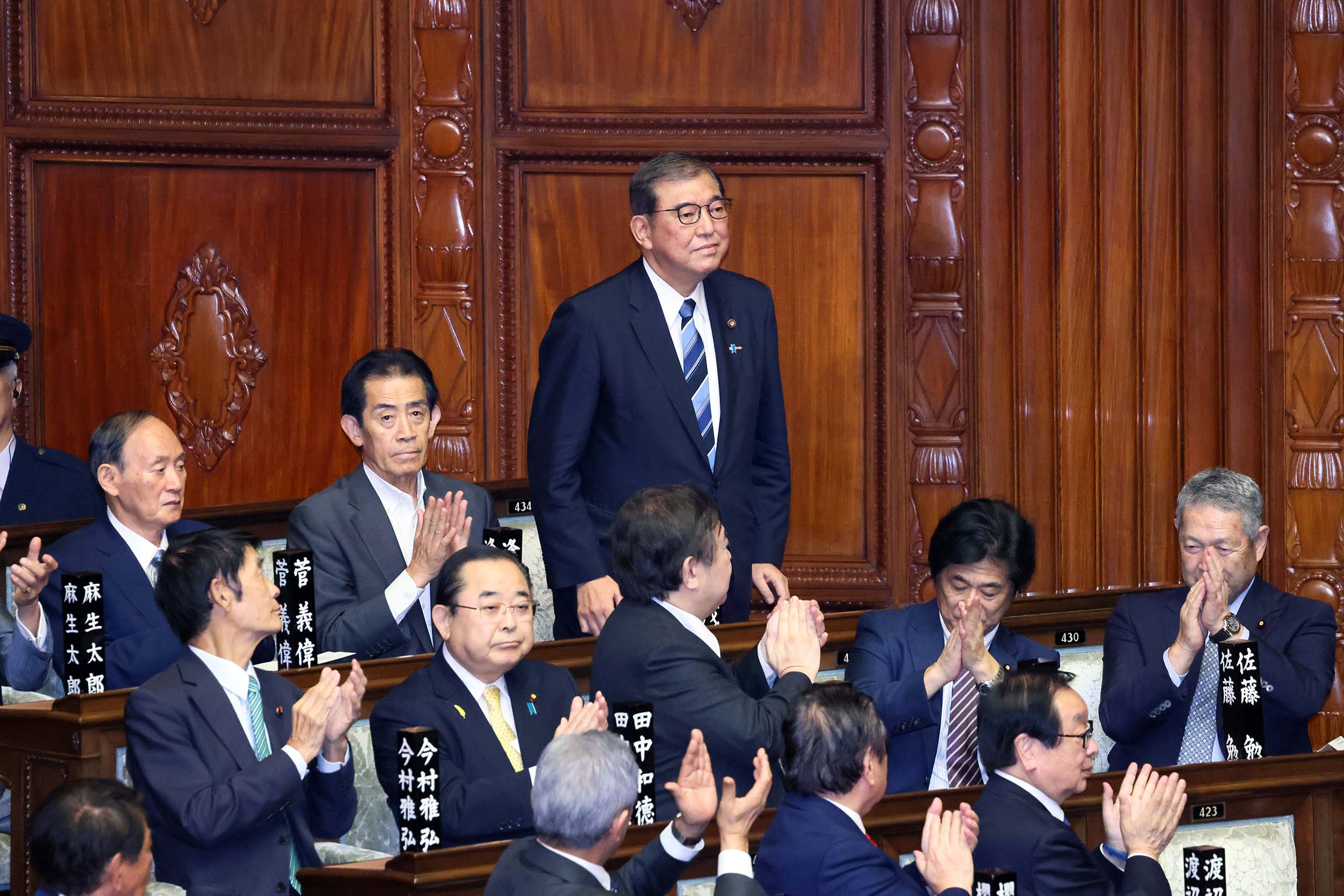
Ishiba is elected as Prime Minister by the Diet, 1 October 2024.

Ishiba was elected by the National Diet and appointed as Prime Minister by Emperor Naruhito at Tokyo Imperial Palace on 1 October 2024, becoming the twenty-fifth Liberal Democratic Prime Minister. Ishiba announced key appointments ahead of the snap general election on 27 October 2024. His Cabinet included rivals from the leadership race, though Sanae Takaichi's exclusion created internal party friction. Uniting the divided ruling party became a primary focus for Ishiba after the closely contested leadership race.

In his first policy speech on 4 October, Ishiba named Japan's low birth rate and the regional security situation as among his primary concerns, describing the former as a "quiet emergency" and the latter as at its "most severe since the end of World War II". He also pledged to continue efforts to ensure the emergence of the Japanese economy from deflation and called for stabilization in the membership of the Imperial House of Japan amid a lack of male successors to the throne. He also expressed regret for the 2023–2024 Japanese slush fund scandal.

=== 2024 general election and Second cabinet ===
On 9 October, Ishiba dissolved the House of Representatives in preparation for the general election on 27 October. On the same day, the LDP decided to pull its endorsement of 12 politicians implicated in the slush fund scandal, and would not allow them to be elected via proportional representation should they lose in their single seat constituencies. Ishiba indicated that the party would resume support for the politicians if they win reelection. Other politicians who have been disciplined by the party over the slush fund scandal would also not be allowed to run on the LDP's proportional representation list.

Despite these measures, LDP still faced its most serious defeat since the 2009 election, with 68 seats lost and therefore its majority in the Diet. On the next day, Ishiba expressed his intention to remain as Prime Minister despite the election results. Commentators noted that his decision for the snap election election may jeopardize his leadership, as rising inflation and a funding scandal threaten his LDP's majority, prompting potential alliances with smaller parties amid growing economic concerns.

On 11 November, Ishiba was reelected as prime minister of a minority government during a session of the Diet, after winning a total of 221 votes from both the first and second rounds, defeating Yoshihiko Noda of the Constitutional Democratic Party of Japan, who secured only 160 votes, following a second round runoff vote. Hours before the Diet assembled, Ishiba's first cabinet resigned, thus resulting in him making an effort to launch a second cabinet. However, it was agreed that his cabinet would mostly remain the same. Ishiba's re-election would also mark the first time in 30 years that any Japanese prime minister needed a runoff vote.

=== Domestic policy ===
During the opening ceremony of the 217th ordinary session of the Diet, Ishiba's government submitted a draft budget for the new fiscal year 2025 with the general account at over 115 trillion yen, the largest ever. The unprecedentedly large budget was attributed to social security expenses related to the aging population and the strengthening of defense capabilities that began under the previous Kishida administration. On 24 January he delivered a policy speech, proclaiming his ideal for a "fun Japan" where everyone "feels safe and secure, and people with diverse values respect each other and strive for self-realization." He also said he would prioritize regional revitalization, addressing the gender pay gap, and digitalization among other issues.

In February 2025, Ishiba worked with the opposition Japan Innovation Party to pass the 2025 fiscal year budget. The budget included provisions that called for free high school education and social insurance premium fee cuts. The agreement was signed by the LDP, Komeito, and Ishin on 26 February.

==== Social issues ====
Ishiba's government announced in January 2025 that same-sex partners will be subject to the same regulations as common-law marriages in 24 laws, including one that stipulates benefits to be paid to the families of crime victims. Consideration for legislation allowing separate surnames for married couples also began in the LDP under Ishiba's presidency. Ishiba's former rival, Sanae Takaichi, urged him to approach the topic with "caution" during internal party deliberations. He has remained hesitant about introducing same-sex marriage legislation.

=== Foreign policy ===
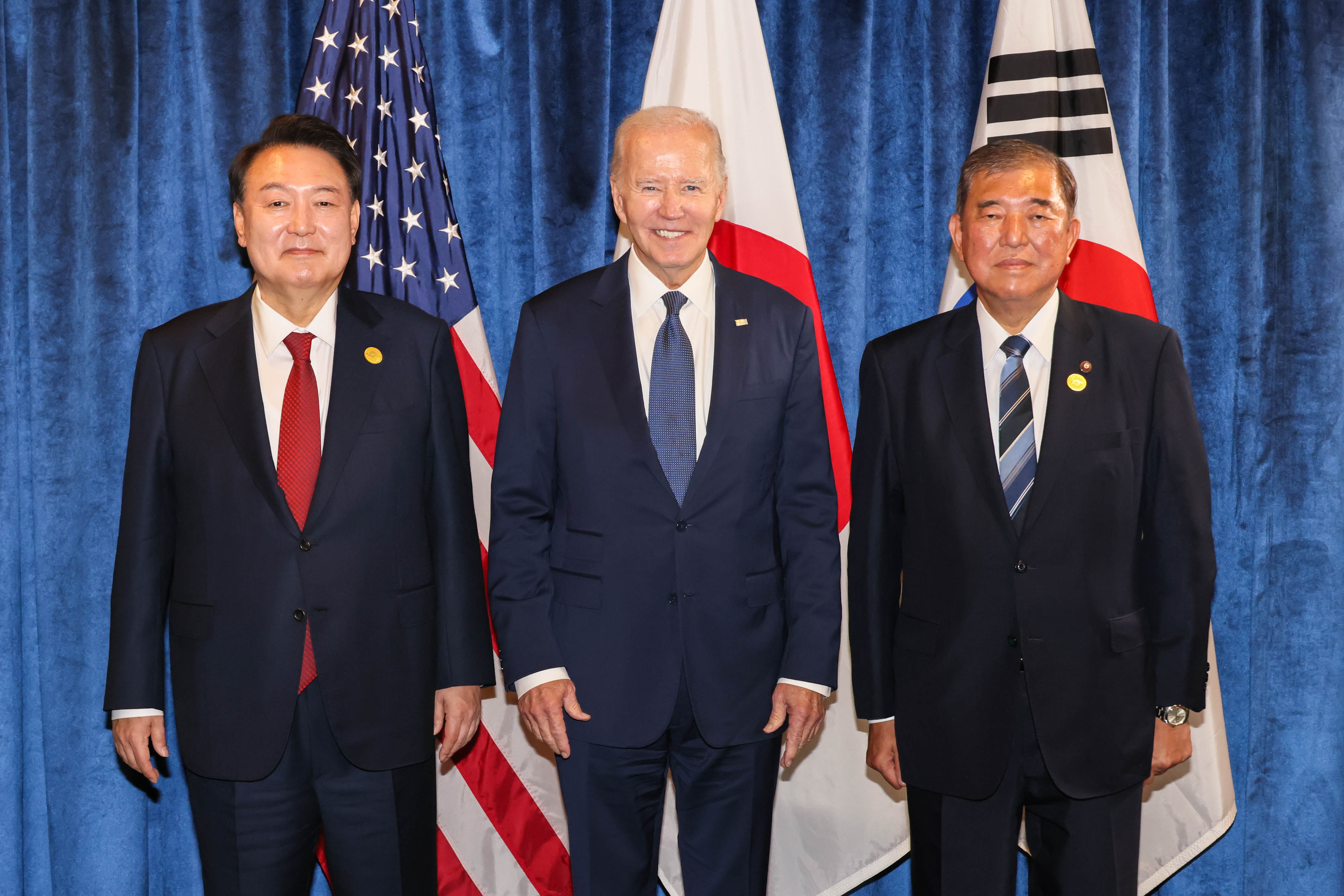
Ishiba with U.S. President Joe Biden and South Korean President Yoon Suk Yeol in November 2024

Ishiba was elected as Prime Minister during the closing months of Joe Biden's presidency in the United States, meeting with him at the APEC summit in Peru in November 2024, alongside South Korean President Yoon Suk Yeol. Later in January 2025 he held a virtual meeting with Biden and Philippine President Bongbong Marcos during which the three agreed to strengthen ties and cooperation. After Donald Trump won the 2024 presidential election, Ishiba congratulated him publicly, stating he would like to meet with him soon in his capacity as President-elect. Unlike his late former rival Shinzo Abe, Ishiba was not able to meet with Trump during his transition period.

After Trump's inauguration, he sent him a congratulatory letter, in which he emphasized the importance of a free and open Indo-Pacific. By February a meeting was set up between the two; Ishiba stated that he would explain to Trump Japan's high investment in the United States and its contributions to US job creation, mirroring a strategy implemented by Abe to negotiate with Trump when he was prime minister. Ishiba sought the advice of Abe's widow, Akie Abe, along with former Prime Minister Fumio Kishida before the meeting. He said he would seek to form a “personal relationship” with Trump. Nevertheless, Ishiba and Trump were referred to as an “odd couple” by National Review and The Economist.

==== United States ====
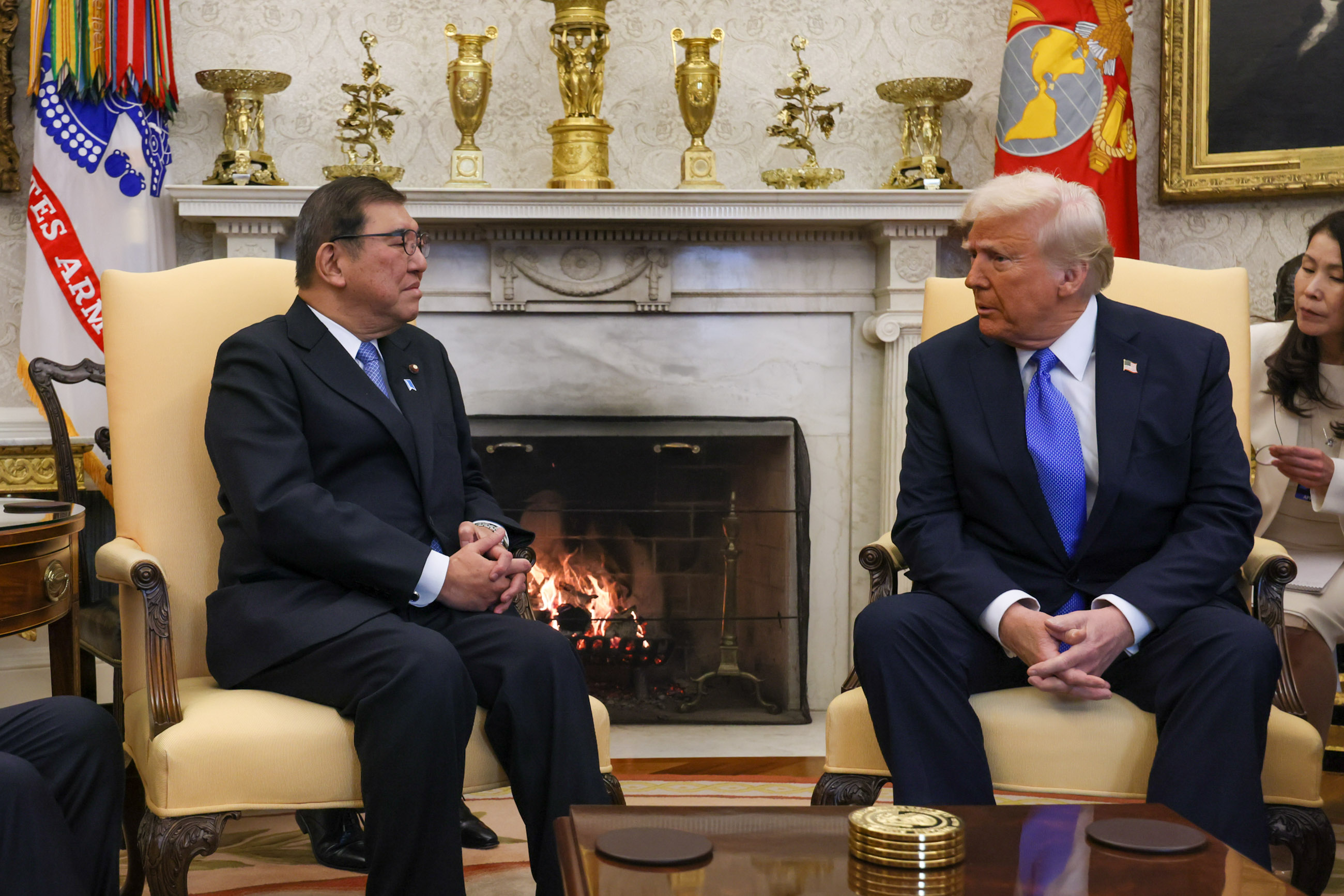
Ishiba meets with U.S. President Donald Trump at the Oval Office of the White House during Ishiba's visit to Washington D.C., 7 February 2025

Ishiba arrived in Washington D.C. on 6 February, along with translator Sunao Takao, who had previously assisted Shinzo Abe communicate with Trump during his tenure as prime minister. Takao was described as an “important asset” to Ishiba, given he is "probably one of the few Japanese people that Trump remembers." Ishiba met with Trump the following day at the White House, where the two held a meeting followed by a press conference. During the meeting, Ishiba praised Trump, describing him as “very sincere.” He also referenced the attempted assassination of Trump that occurred in July 2024, and drew similarities between their domestic regional revitalization policies.

When speaking to the press, Trump confirmed that Nippon Steel would invest in US Steel rather than own it. He also expressed his desire to “eliminate” the United States’ $68 billion trade deficit with Japan, believing there would not be “any problems” in the relationship between the two countries. Despite this, Trump did not rule out the possibility of levying tariffs on Japan, but said it was unlikely. During the press conference, Ishiba announced that Japan would be raising its investment in the United States to $1 billion, and that Toyota and Isuzu were planning to build new factories in the United States.

On security, Trump said the US would continue to provide Japan with military security assistance and praised its efforts to increase defense spending. The two also agreed to cooperate on deterring China's economic power and reducing the threat of North Korea's nuclear weapons program. Trump and Ishiba agreed to pursue a "new golden age" for U.S.-Japan relations. Trump later announced 24% reciprocal tariffs on all Japanese goods on 2 April 2025. Ishiba said that the tariffs were "difficult to understand" given Japan's economic investment in the United States and its status as one of America's largest trading partners.

==== China, South Korea, and response to tariffs ====
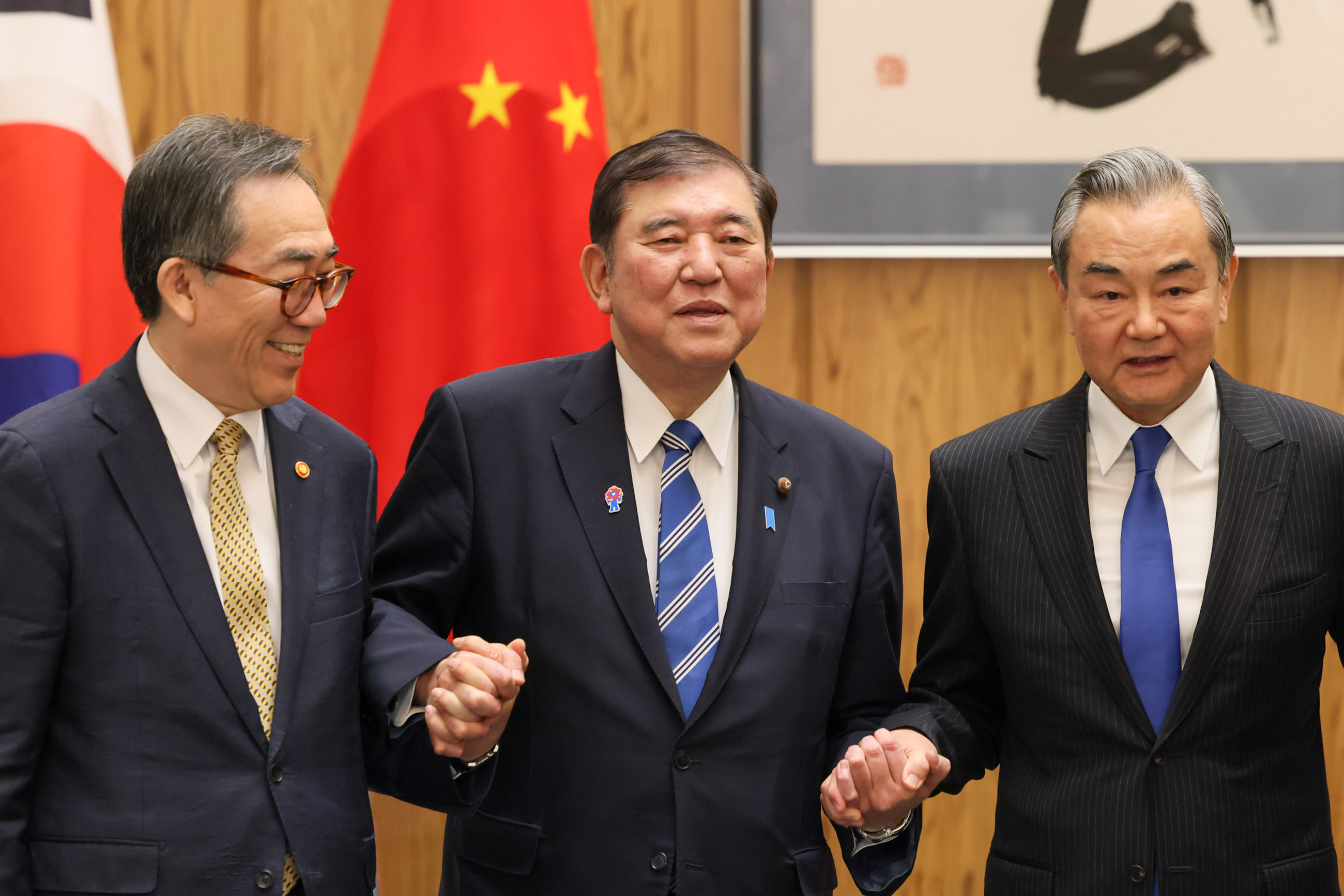
Ishiba with the Foreign Ministers of South Korea (Cho Tae-yul; left) and China (Wang Yi; right) in March 2025.

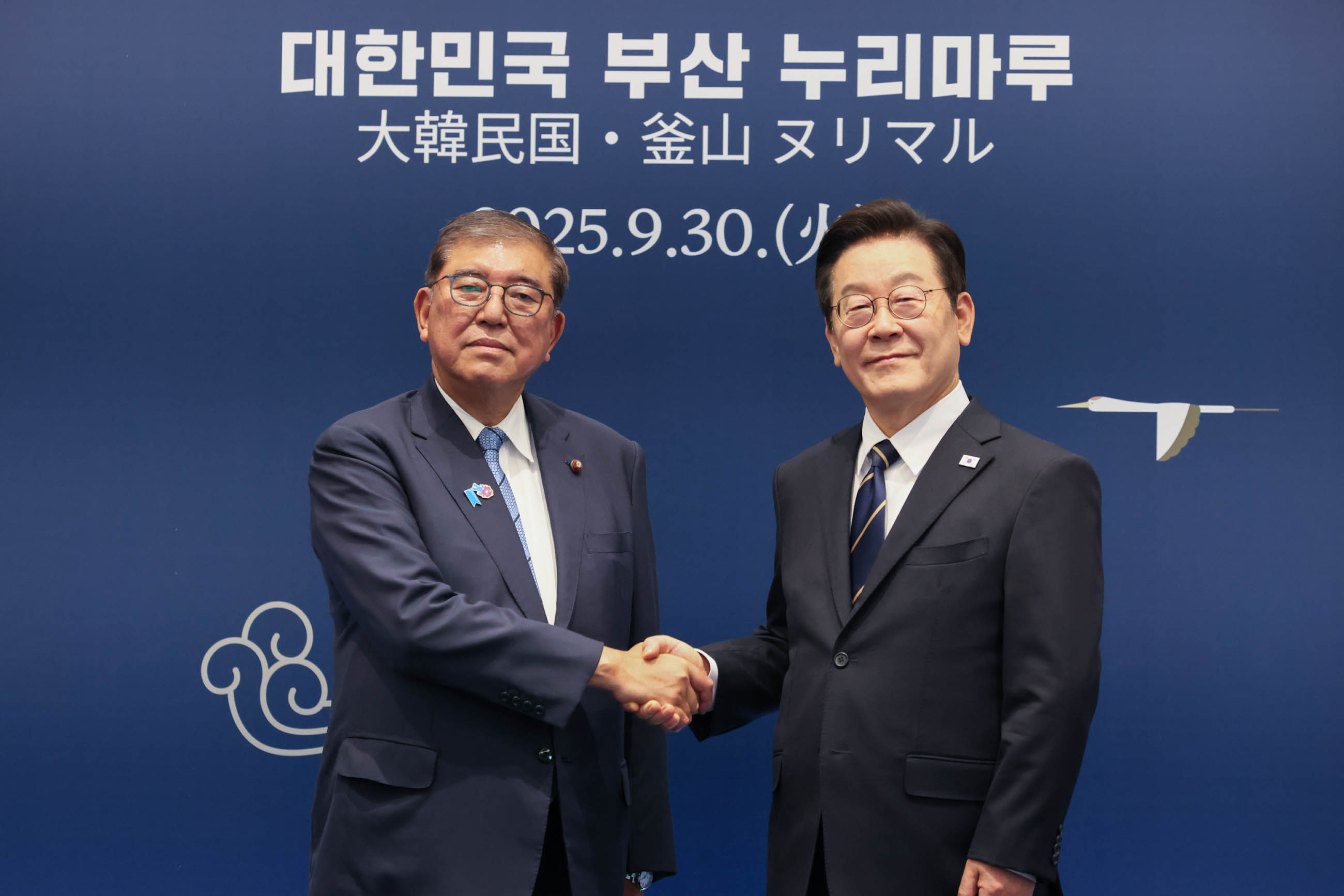
Ishiba meets with South Korean President Lee Jae-myung at the Nurimaru APEC House in Busan, 30 September 2025.

In November 2024, Ishiba urged American President Joe Biden to approve Nippon-US Steel deal, which he ultimately blocked. Following the decision, Minister of Foreign Affairs Takeshi Iwaya visited China in December; the meeting was seen as signs of improving of ties. Later in January the LDP-led Japan-China Parliamentary Friendship Association made a trip to China. The meeting was the first of the Japan-China Ruling Party Exchange Council since October 2018. In January 2025, Ishiba's government announced that the Ministry of Foreign Affairs would be easing visa requirements for Chinese tourists. The plan sparked criticism from within the LDP.

Ishiba's diplomatic stance regarding China was notably criticized by Kōichi Hagiuda, who demanded more thorough explanations for the recent shifts in policy. A day before Donald Trump's "Liberation Day" tariffs were announced, the governments of China and South Korea in coordination with Japan, agreed to jointly respond to the expected tariffs, with the three countries agreeing to strengthen free trade. After Yoon Suk Yeol was removed from office as President of South Korea on 4 April 2025, Ishiba stated that "Regardless of administration, cooperation between Japan and South Korea is crucial not only for our security, but also for our country's independence and peace, and for peace and stability in the region."

In response to tariffs announced by the second Trump administration in the United States, Ishiba established a council of relevant ministers for a whole-of-government response. He referred to the tariff situation as “like a national crisis,” and called on the other political parties to cooperate in presenting a unified front. CDP leader Yoshihiko Noda urged Ishiba to directly negotiate with Trump. In response, Ishiba claimed that "Trump is a man who does not like to be criticized" and that "I don't know who to talk to to get through to Trump," a remark that earned criticism from Ishin co-leader Seiji Maehara.

Ishiba also faced criticism from the CDP for his response to the tariffs. Finance Minister Katsunobu Kato said on 4 April that it was 'theoretically possible' to levy retaliatory tariffs, but only after "going through the [World Trade Organization] dispute settlement procedure as much as possible." That same day, Ishiba held talks with opposition parties over the tariffs.

==== Ukraine, Gaza, and other issues ====
In February 2025, Ishiba said that the government would consider offering medical care for sick and wounded residents of the Gaza strip, amidst Israel's war with Hamas that has been ongoing since October 2023. He also said that educational opportunities could also be offered to people from Gaza.

Similar to his predecessor Fumio Kishida, Ishiba has maintained support for Ukraine during the Russian invasion that began in 2022. In February 2025, Defense Minister Gen Nakatani revealed that the Japan Self-Defense Forces would provide approximately 30 additional transport vehicles to the Ukrainian military. After a heated argument between Ukrainian President Volodymyr Zelenskyy and Donald Trump and his Vice President JD Vance during a meeting at the White House that was televised live on 28 February 2025, Ishiba stated that the meeting "took a somewhat unexpected turn and there appears to have been a very emotional exchange of words" and that Japan would "do all it can to prevent divisions between the United States and Ukraine."

Yoshihiko Noda, the leader of the Constitutional Democratic Party, accused Ishiba of not having a 'clear message' regarding the break between Trump and Zelenskyy and not 'doing enough' after divisions began to form between the US and Ukraine and Europe. At a press conference in Ōita, Noda stated that "Prime Minister Ishiba has not sent a clear message. Japan's stance is unclear." In March 2025, Japan adjusted its language on support for Ukraine from “strengthen” to "will maintain” support. The change was made to minimize the difference between Japanese and US policy. That same month, Japanese representatives participated in meetings of the Coalition of the Willing. After a meeting between Zelenskyy, several European leaders, and Trump at the White House in August 2025, Ishiba stated that the Japanese government would consider a potential role in providing security guarantees to Ukraine, as part of a wider peace agreement.

In February 2025, the Defense Ministries of Japan and the Philippines agreed to establish a high-level framework to help expand defense equipment and technology exports from Japan.

=== Gift certificates scandal ===
On 13 March 2025, the Asahi Shimbun newspaper revealed that several LDP members of parliament who were elected for the first time in the 2024 general election received gift certificates from the office of Ishiba in early March. Ishiba's office later confirmed that he had distributed gift certificates worth approximately ¥100,000 ($676) each to about a dozen lawmakers as "souvenirs” intended to be used to purchase new suits. Ishiba claimed the certificates were paid from his personal funds and were not intended for political activities but as a supplement for living expenses.

According to the Yomiuri Shimbun, most of the lawmakers decided to return the gift certificates instead of using them. The incident took place while discussions were underway in the Diet on the transparency of political funds, particularly regarding corporate and organizational donations. Ishiba had met with Komeito Chief Representative Tetsuo Saito the day before, who pledged his party's support for him; earlier in the week upper house LDP lawmaker Shoji Nishida publicly stated that Ishiba should be replaced by a new party President. Former LDP leadership rival Takayuki Kobayashi criticized Ishiba over the scandal, saying that it would be hard for the public to understand the position and that such an incident should not happen again.

Ishiba, who was elected as LDP President on a reformist platform, was widely criticized by opposition lawmakers. CDP leader Yoshihiko Noda promised to pursue inquiries over the incident in the Diet. Osaka Prefecture Governor and Japan Innovation Party co-leader Hirofumi Yoshimura criticized Ishiba's actions. The Political Funds Control Act prohibits donations of cash or securities to individual politicians; the 100,000 yen in gift certificates in this case could have been considered a 'donation’ in this case.

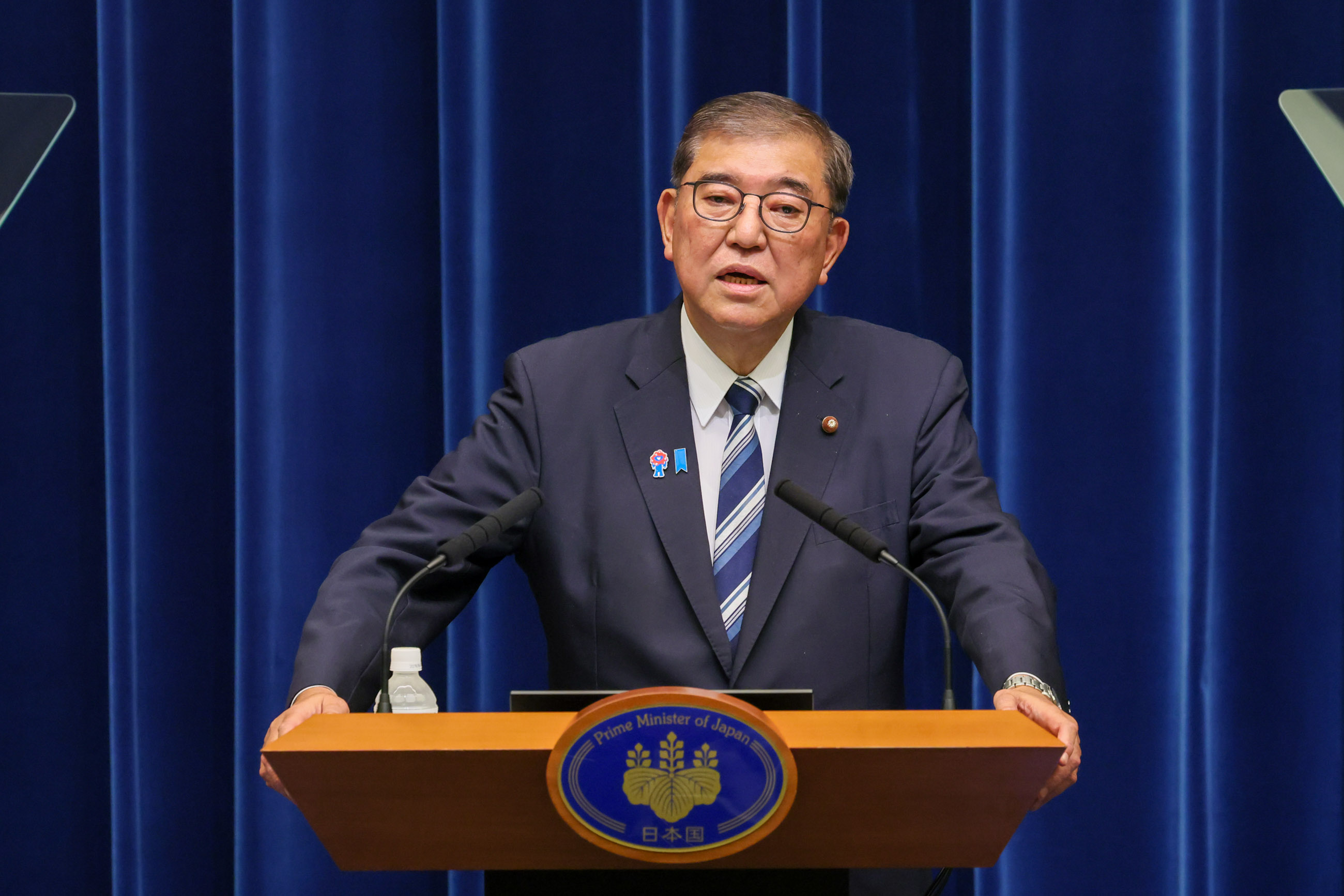
Ishiba announced his intention to resign as Prime Minister on 7 September 2025

=== Resignation ===
The LDP-Komeito coalition lost its majority in the 2025 Japanese House of Councillors election on 20 July. Following the election, Ishiba said that he would continue in office as prime minister, planning to remain in office until after tariff negotiations with the United States were completed. After a trade deal between the two nations it was falsely reported on 23 July that Ishiba would resign at the end of August. However, at a press conference at the LDP headquarters later that same day, Ishiba denied the reports. An opinion poll released on 22 July saw public approval ratings for Ishiba's government decrease to 23%, the lowest since it took office.

Following weeks of infighting within the LDP, Ishiba announced his intention to resign as party president and prime minister on 7 September. He was pressured to resign by fellow lawmakers, including Yoshihide Suga and Shinjirō Koizumi, due to the threat of a probable snap party presidential election. Ishiba's resignation triggered a snap presidential election within the LDP, which was won by Takaichi.
