= Seiichi Eto =

Japanese politician

- 衛藤 晟一
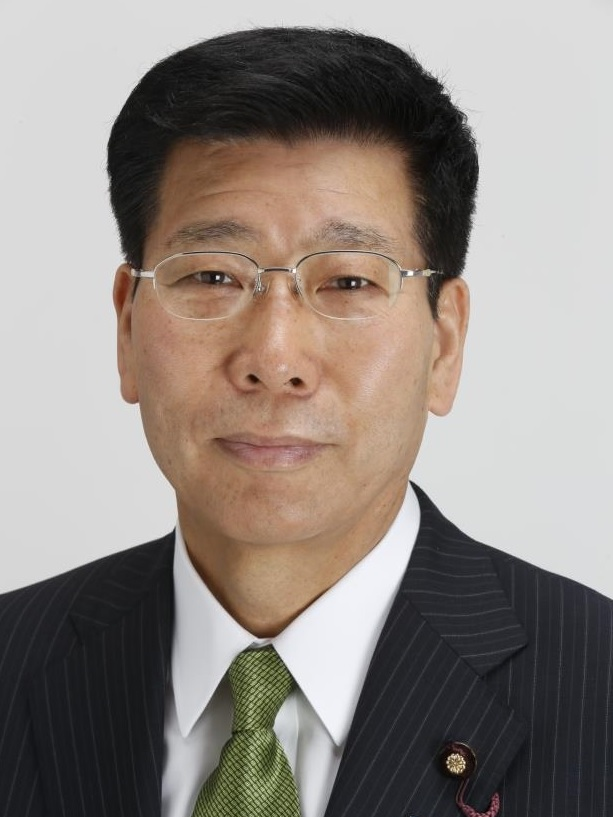
- Official portrait, 2019

Minister of State for Consumer Affairs and Food Safety
- In office 11 September 2019 – 16 September 2020
- Prime Minister: Shinzo Abe
- Preceded by: Mitsuhiro Miyakoshi
- Succeeded by: Shinji Inoue
Ministerial offices
Minister of State for Declining Birth Rates
In office 11 September 2019 – 16 September 2020
Prime Minister	Shinzo Abe
Preceded by	Mitsuhiro Miyakoshi
Succeeded by	Tetsushi Sakamoto
Minister of State for Ocean Policy
In office 11 September 2019 – 16 September 2020
Prime Minister	Shinzo Abe
Preceded by	Mitsuhiro Miyakoshi
Succeeded by	Hachiro Okonogi
Minister of State for Okinawa and Northern Territories Affairs
In office 11 September 2019 – 16 September 2020
Prime Minister	Shinzo Abe
Preceded by	Mitsuhiro Miyakoshi
Succeeded by	Taro Kono

Member of the House of Councillors
- In office 30 July 2007 – 28 July 2025
- Constituency: National PR

Member of the House of Representatives
- In office 11 November 2003 – 8 August 2005
- Constituency: Kyushu PR
- In office 19 February 1990 – 2 June 2000
- Preceded by: Keinosuke Kinoshita
- Succeeded by: Multi-member district
- Constituency: Ōita 1st (1990–1996); Kyushu PR (1996–2000)

Member of the Ōita Prefectural Assembly
- In office April 1979 – November 1986
- Constituency: Ōita City

Member of the Ōita City Assembly
- In office 1973 – March 1979

Personal details
- Born: 1 October 1947 (age 79) Ōita City, Ōita, Japan
- Party: Liberal Democratic
- Children: Hiroaki Eto
- Education: Oita University (BEc)

Seiichi Eto (衛藤 晟一, Etō Seiichi; born 1 October 1947) is a Japanese politician of the Liberal Democratic Party, who served as a minister of state from 2019 to 2020.

He served as a member of the House of Councillors since 2007, and previously served in the House of Representatives. He was a friend and adviser to Prime Minister Shinzo Abe.

== Biography ==
Seiichi Eto was born on 1 October 1947 in Ōita, the capital of Oita Prefecture. He studied economics as Oita University. As a student, he was involved in right-wing student activities in opposition to the left-wing Zengakuren, which dominated campuses at the time.

Eto graduated in 1970. Three years later he was elected to the Ōita City Council. He served for two terms until his election to the Ōita Prefectural Assembly in 1979. After an unsuccessful run in 1986, Eto was elected to the House of Representatives for the first time in 1990, representing 1st Oita district.

In 1994, Eto supported the idea of offering the premiership to the Japan Socialist Party Chairman Tomiichi Murayama, to realise a coalition government between the LDP and the socialists. Murayama was Eto's rival in his constituency. The fact he supported it despite being personally disadvantaged by it contributed to the idea being accepted within the LDP, leading to the birth of the Murayama Cabinet.

Eto lost his seat in 2000, but was re-elected three years later. He lost his seat again in 2005, having been refused LDP endorsement due to voting against Prime Minister Junichiro Koizumi's postal privatisation bill. After Koizumi was succeeded by Eto's friend Shinzo Abe, most of the postal rebels who had won reelection were readmited to the LDP. It was unclear what would happen to those of the rebels who had lost their seats, but Eto was chosen as a candidate in the proportional block for the 2007 House of Councillors election by the strong will of Prime Minister Abe. Tough the party faced a setback overall, Eto was reelected.

When Abe returned to the premiership in December 2012, Eto became a special adviser to the Prime Minister. In September 2019, Eto entered the Fourth Abe Cabinet as a Minister of State with several portfolios: Okinawa and Northern Territories Affairs, Consumer Affairs and Food Safety, measures against the declining birthrate and Ocean Policy. He left cabinet as Abe stepped down in September 2020.

After leaving cabinet, Eto served in the LDP as chairman of a policy committee on the declining birthrate. He also chaired the party disciplinary committee.

In July 2024, Eto expressed his intention to not run for reelection in the 2025 House of Councillors election. As a reason he noted that his son Hiroaki Eto had been selected as LDP candidate for Ōita 1st district in the House of Representatives and that it was likely to be criticised if father and son were both running for office.

In November 2024, Eto was appointed head of the LDP taskforce for the abduction issue.

Eto is affiliated to the right-wing organisation Nippon Kaigi and served as secretary general of the Nippon Kaigi Diet Members' Roundtable (日本会議国会議員懇談会).
