= Mitsuhiro Miyakoshi =

Japanese politician (born 1950)

- 宮腰 光寛
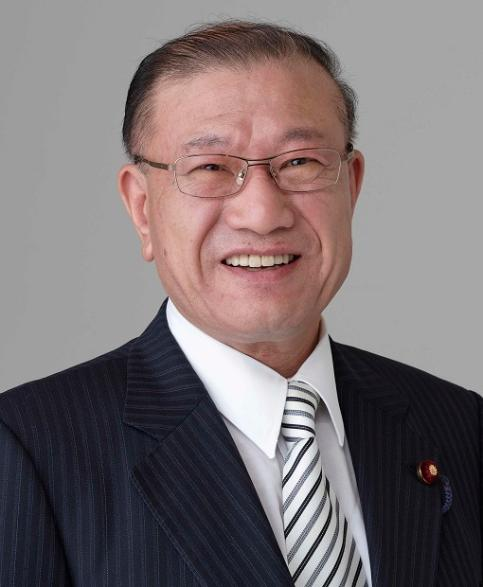
- Official portrait, 2016

Minister of State for Okinawa and the Northern Territories
- In office 2 October 2018 – 11 September 2019
- Prime Minister: Shinzo Abe
- Preceded by: Teru Fukui
- Succeeded by: Seiichi Eto

Minister of State for Consumer and Food Safety
- In office 2 October 2018 – 11 September 2019
- Prime Minister: Shinzo Abe
- Preceded by: Teru Fukui
- Succeeded by: Seiichi Eto

Minister of State for Declining Birth Rate
- In office 2 October 2018 – 11 September 2019
- Prime Minister: Shinzo Abe
- Preceded by: Masashi Matsuyama
- Succeeded by: Seiichi Eto

Minister of State for Ocean Policy
- In office 2 October 2018 – 11 September 2019
- Prime Minister: Shinzo Abe
- Preceded by: Teru Fukui
- Succeeded by: Seiichi Eto

Member of the House of Representatives
- In office 23 August 1998 – 14 October 2021
- Preceded by: Hiroshi Sumi
- Succeeded by: Hidetoshi Ueda
- Constituency: Toyama 2nd

Member of the Toyama Prefectural Assembly
- In office 1983–1998

Personal details
- Born: 21 December 1950 (age 75) Kurobe, Toyama, Japan
- Party: Liberal Democratic (since 1998)
- Education: Kyoto University

Mitsuhiro Miyakoshi (宮腰 光寛, Miyakoshi Mitsuhiro; born 21 December 1950) is a former Japanese politician of the Liberal Democratic Party (LDP), who served as a member of the House of Representatives in the Diet (national legislature) and Minister of State for Okinawa and Northern Territories Affairs. A native of Kurobe, Toyama and dropout of Kyoto University, he was elected to the first of his four terms in the assembly of Toyama Prefecture in 1983 and then to the House of Representatives for the first time in 1998.

Miyakoshi likes Awamori, an alcoholic beverage in Okinawa, very much.
