= Hiroaki Eto =

Japanese politician (born 1979)

- 衛藤 博昭

Member of the House of Representatives
- Incumbent
- Assumed office 8 February 2026
- Preceded by: Shuji Kira
- Constituency: Ōita 1st

Member of the Ōita Prefectural Assembly
- In office 2015–2023
- Constituency: Ōita City

Personal details
- Born: 25 November 1979 (age 46) Ōita City, Ōita, Japan
- Party: Liberal Democratic
- Parent: Seiichi Eto (father)
- Education: Keio University

Hiroaki Eto (衛藤博昭, Eto Hiroaki; born 25 November 1979) is a Japanese politician serving as a member of the House of Representatives since 2026. He is the son of Seiichi Eto.

== Biography ==
After graduating from Keio University, Eto worked at Mitsubishi Heavy Industries for about nine years. He was involved in exporting Japanese railway technology. Eto was elected to the Ōita Prefectural Assembly in 2015 and served until 2023.

Eto was selected as the LDP candidate for Ōita 1st district in the 2024 general election, but was defeated by the independent incumbent Shuji Kira. He ran again in 2026 and was elected, defeating Kira.
