= Oita University =

Higher education institution in Ōita, Japan

- 大分大学
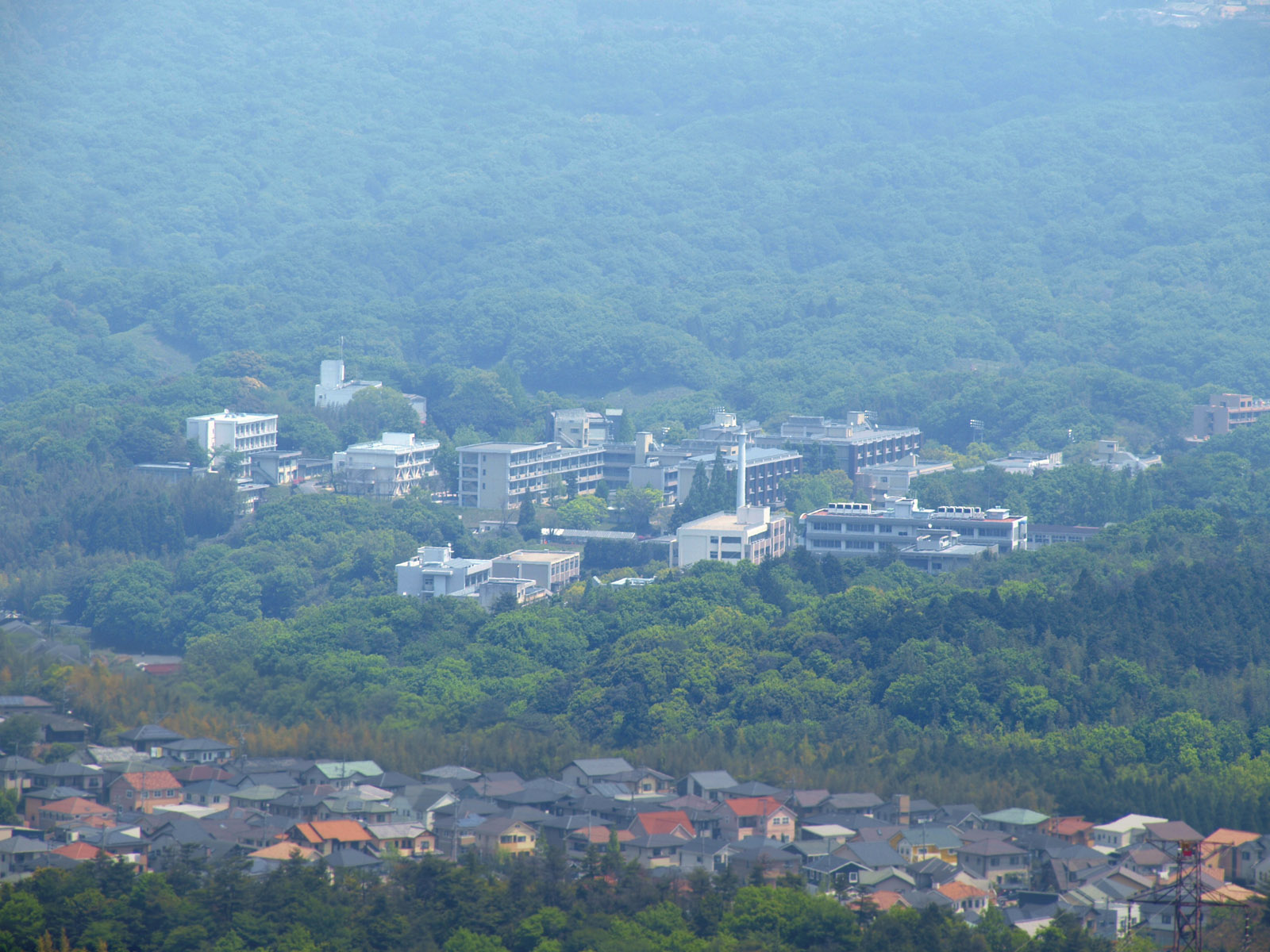
- Type: National
- Established: 1949
- President: Seigō Kitano
- Location: Ōita, Ōita, Japan; 33°10′32″N 131°36′47″E
- Website: Official website

Oita University (大分大学, Ōita daigaku) is a national university in Ōita, Ōita Prefecture, Japan. It was established in 1949, and in 2003 absorbed Oita Medical University, which had been established in 1976. The university offers courses in economics, education, engineering, international studies, and medicine.

The university provides an international program with two strains: IPOU an NIHO: the former for Japanese speakers below a certain skill level; the latter for those with a level of Japanese that would permit them to follow a normal Japanese curriculum. As well as the mandatory Japanese lessons, students can take courses related to Japanese history, popular culture, and subject specific courses including Economics and Linguistics.
