= Yūshi no Kai =

Japanese parliamentary group

Yūshi no Kai 有志の会
- Leader: Shuji Kira
- Founded: 4 November 2021
- Dissolved: 23 January 2026
- Ideology: Conservative liberalism Moderate conservatism
- Political position: Centre

The Yūshi no Kai (Japanese: 有志の会; lit. 'Volunteer Association') was a parliamentary group of the Japanese House of Representatives.

== History ==
The group was formed on 4 November 2021, and submitted a notice of formation of the parliamentary group to the secretariat of the House of Representatives, which was accepted. It was initially composed of five independent members of the opposition who were elected in the 2021 general election, all with experience belonging to the Democratic Party of Japan, Democratic Party, and Kibō no Tō.

The spokesperson of the group was Shuji Kira from Ōita 1st district. On 4 November 2021, Kira said, "It's a blank slate. We'll think about it while checking the situation" when asked if he would form a unified parliamentary group with the Constitutional Democratic Party.

Hirobumi Niki left the group and joined the Liberal Democratic Party in September 2023. In January 2026, Keiro Kitagami likewise joined the LDP. In the February 2026 general election only Rintaro Ogata managed to retain his seat.

== Members ==
Representative	Constituency
Shuji Kira	Ōita 1st district
Keiro Kitagami	Kyoto 4th district
Rintaro Ogata	Fukuoka 9th district
Nobuyuki Fukushima	Ibaraki 1st district
Hirobumi Niki	Tokushima 1st district

== See also ==
- Parliamentary group
