= Ōita 1st district =

1st single member district of Oita Prefecture, formed in 1994

Ōita 1st District
- 大分県第1区
- Parliamentary constituency for the Japanese House of Representatives
- Proportional District: Kyushu
- Electorate: 386,368 (as of September 2022)

Current constituency
- Created: 1994
- Seats: One
- Party: LDP
- Representative: Hiroaki Eto

Ōita 1st District (大分県第1区, Ōita-ken dai-i-ku) is an electoral district in the Japanese House of Representatives. The district was established as a single-member constituency in 1994 from parts of the original 1st district.

== Area covered ==
=== Current district ===
As of 5 January 2023, the areas covered by this district are as follows:

- Ōita (city) (excluding the former towns of Saganoseki and Notsuharu)

=== Areas covered before 2013 ===
Before the 2013 redistricting, the area covered by the district were as follows:

- Ōita (city)

== Elected representatives ==
Representative	Party	Years served	Notes
Tomiichi Murayama	SDP	1996 – 2000	
Ban Kugimiya	DPJ	2000 – 2003	
Shuji Kira	Indep.	2003 – 2005	
Shuji Kira	DPJ	2005 – 2012	
Youichi Anami	LDP	2012 – 2014	
Shuji Kira	DPJ	2014 – 2017	
Youichi Anami	LDP	2017 – 2021	
Shuji Kira	Indep.	2021 – 2026	
Hiroaki Eto	LDP	2026 –	

== Election results ==
‡ - Also ran in the Kyushu PR district

‡‡ - Also ran and won a seat in the Kyushu PR district

2026
Party	Candidate	Votes	%	±%
LDP	Hiroaki Eto^{‡}	95,484	45.1	▲9.3
Independent	Shuji Kira	71,151	33.6	▼15.5
Sanseitō	Shinsuke Nonaka^{‡}	20,432	9.6	▲1.7
DPP	Junta Tsutsumi^{‡}	15,687	7.4	
JCP	Kai Yamashita	9,158	4.3	▼2.9
Registered electors		382,929		
Turnout			56.24	▲3.77
LDP gain from Independent				

2024
Party	Candidate	Votes	%	±%
Independent	Shuji Kira	96,944	49.1	▲0.3
LDP	Hiroaki Eto^{‡}	70,584	35.8	▼2.3
Sanseitō	Shinsuke Nonaka^{‡}	15,626	7.9	
JCP	Kai Yamashita	14,186	7.2	▼0.8
Registered electors		383,997		
Turnout			52.47	▼0.70
Independent hold				

2021
Party	Candidate	Votes	%	±%
Independent	Shuji Kira (incumbent - Kyushu PR) (endorsed by the Oita Prefectural Federations of the CDP and the DPP)	97,117	48.8	
LDP	Maiko Takahashi^{‡}	75,932	38.1	
JCP	Kai Yamashita	15,889	8.0	
Independent	Shigetaka Nishimiya	6,216	3.1	
Anti-NHK	Misaki Nonaka	4,001	2.0	
Turnout		204,954	53.2	
Independent gain from LDP				

2017
Party	Candidate	Votes	%	±%
LDP	Youichi Anami^{‡} (incumbent - Kyushu PR) (endorsed by Komeito)	90,422	46.4	
Kibō no Tō	Shuji Kira^{‡‡} (incumbent)	87,392	44.8	
JCP	Megumi Kotegawa	17,082	8.8	
Turnout		119,060	52.0	
LDP gain from Democratic				

2014
Party	Candidate	Votes	%	±%
Democratic	Shuji Kira^{‡}	94,893	48.3	
LDP	Youichi Anami^{‡‡} (incumbent)	88,507	45.0	
JCP	Shigeru Yamamoto	13,113	6.7	
Turnout				
Democratic gain from LDP				

2012
Party	Candidate	Votes	%	±%
LDP	Youichi Anami^{‡} (endorsed by Komeito)	84,848	39.9	
Democratic	Shuji Kira^{‡} (incumbent) (endorsed by the PNP)	74,590	35.0	
Restoration	Hiroshi Kuwahara^{‡} (endorsed by Your Party)	34,367	16.2	
JCP	Shigeru Yamamoto	9,316	4.4	
Tomorrow	Kotegawa Hiroshi^{‡} (endorsed by New Party Daichi)	8,586	4.0	
Independent	Someya Seiji	1,149	0.5	
Turnout				
LDP gain from Democratic				

2009
Party	Candidate	Votes	%	±%
Democratic	Shuji Kira^{‡} (incumbent)	141,665	59.0	
LDP	Youichi Anami^{‡} (endorsed by Komeito)	80,855	33.6	
JCP	Kai Yamashita^{‡}	14,821	6.2	
Happiness Realization	Tayoko Takahata	2,893	1.2	
Turnout				
Democratic hold				

2005
Party	Candidate	Votes	%	±%
Democratic	Shuji Kira^{‡} (incumbent)	94,594	39.3	
Independent	Seiichi Eto	90,667	37.7	
LDP	Sato Ren^{‡‡} (incumbent - Kyushu PR)	46,205	19.2	
JCP	Hiroko Kawano	9,369	3.9	
Turnout				
Democratic gain from Independent				

2003
Party	Candidate	Votes	%	±%
Independent	Shuji Kira (endorsed by the DPJ)	105,628	48.6	
LDP	Seiichi Eto^{‡‡}	101,789	46.8	
JCP	Eizo Tsutumi	8,646	4.0	
Independent	Someya Seiji	1,254	0.6	
Turnout				
Independent gain from Democratic				

2000
Party	Candidate	Votes	%	±%
Democratic	Ban Kugimiya^{‡}	96,223	47.0	
LDP	Seiichi Eto^{‡}	94,094	46.0	
JCP	Masami Doi	12,073	5.9	
Independent	Noriaki Kameyama	2,252	1.1	
Turnout				
Democratic gain from Social Democratic				

1996
Party	Candidate	Votes	%	±%
Social Democratic	Tomiichi Murayama^{‡}	106,258	59.5	
LDP	Seiich Eto^{‡‡}	57,301	32.1	
JCP	Noboru Mieno	10,666	6.0	
Liberal League	Yasuhiro Tomozawa^{‡}	2,813	1.6	
Independent	Noriaki Kameyama	1,574	0.9	
Turnout		185,627	62.9	
Social Democratic win (new seat)				
