= Shinji Takeuchi =

Japanese politician

- 竹内 進二
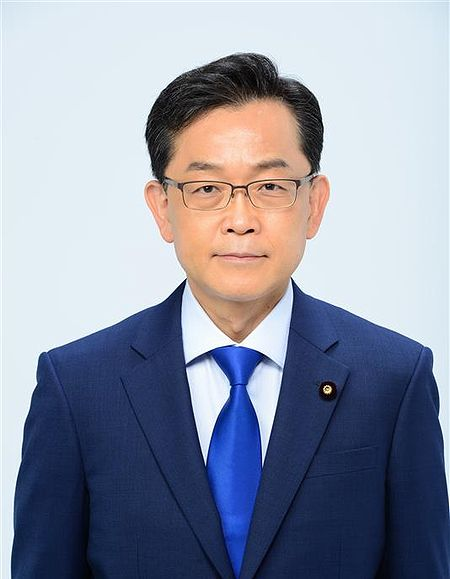
- Official portrait, 2024

Member of the House of Councillors
- Incumbent
- Assumed office 13 October 2017
- Preceded by: Hiroaki Nagasawa
- Constituency: National PR

Personal details
- Born: 19 March 1964 (age 62) Katsushika, Tokyo, Japan
- Party: Komeito
- Education: Waseda University

Shinji Takeuchi is a Japanese politician who is a member of the House of Councillors of Japan.

== Career ==
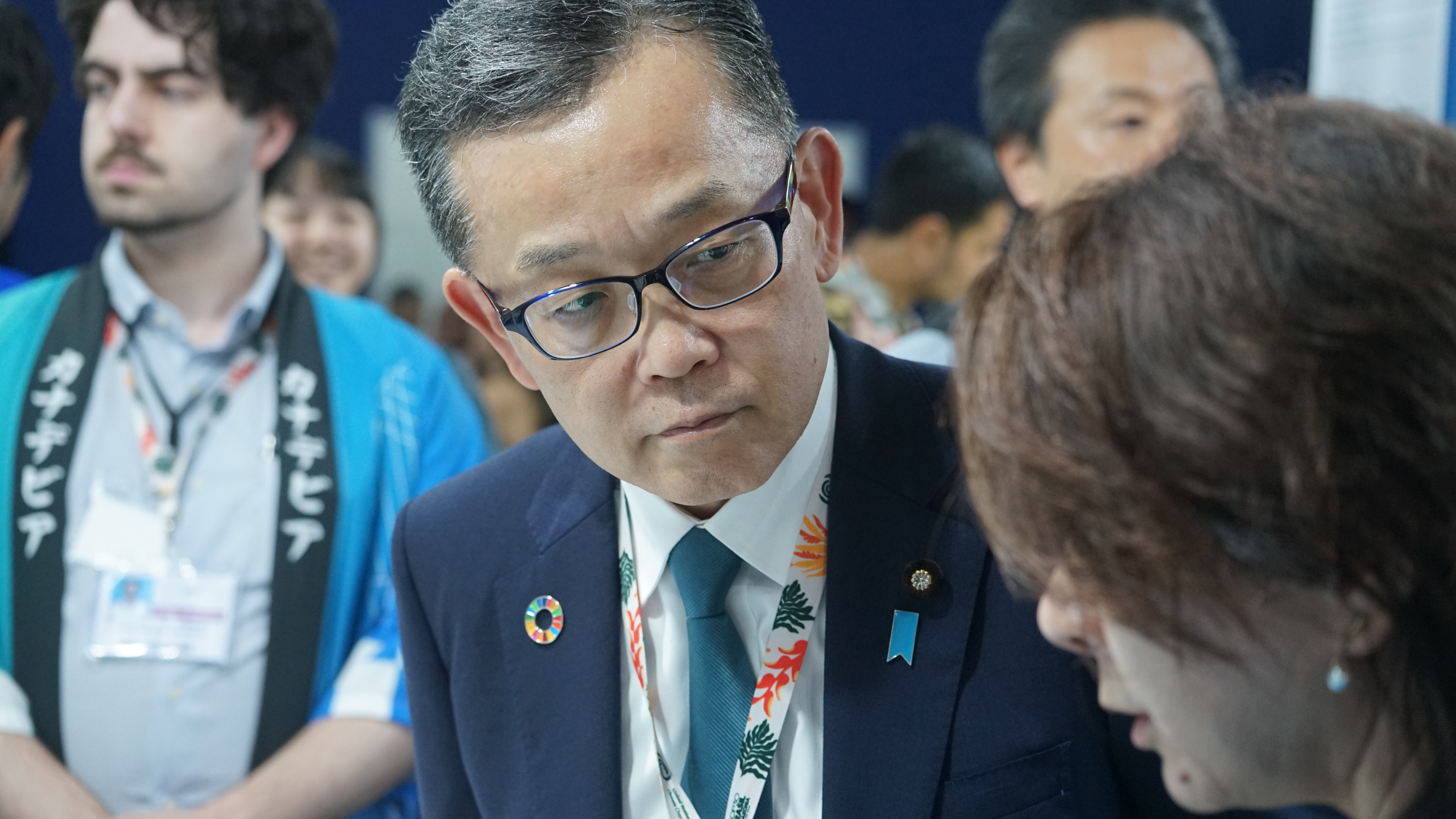
Takeuchi at COP30 in 2025

He attended and graduated from Waseda University School of Political Science and Economics. He was elected in 2017 and re-elected in 2022.
