= Yoko Wanibuchi =

Japanese politician

- 鰐淵 洋子
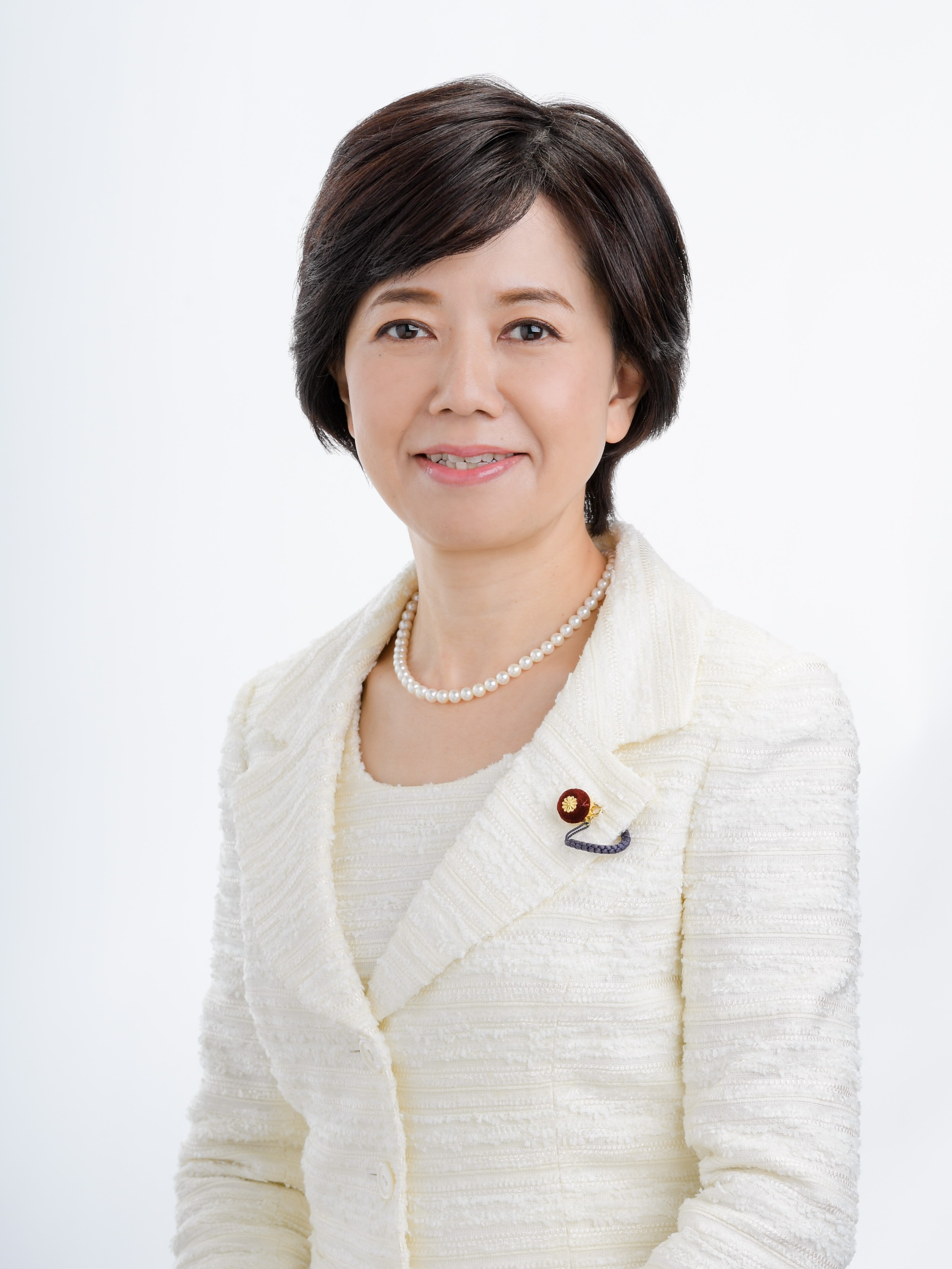
- Official portrait, 2021

Member of the House of Representatives
- In office 22 October 2017 – 23 January 2026
- Preceded by: Naoya Higuchi
- Succeeded by: Multi-member district
- Constituency: Kinki PR

Member of the House of Councillors
- In office 26 July 2004 – 25 July 2010
- Constituency: National PR

Personal details
- Born: 10 April 1972 (age 54) Fukuoka, Japan
- Party: Komeito
- Education: Soka Women's College

Yoko Wanibuchi (鰐淵 洋子, Wanibuchi Yōko; born 10 April 1972) is a Japanese politician who served in the House of Representatives from 2017 to 2026 as a member of the Komeito Party. She was previously served in the House of Councillors from 2004 to 2010.

== Early life ==
Wanibuchi is a native of Fukuoka and graduated from Soka Women's College,

== Political career ==
Wanibuchi was elected for the first time in 2004. She has served as a member of the House of Councillors for 1 term and was a State Secretary in the Ministry of Education, Culture, Sports, Science and Technology under the cabinets of Yoshihide Suga, as well as in the first and second cabinets of Fumio Kishida.

In October 2024, she was appointed as Deputy Minister of Health, Labour and Welfare.
