= Shuji Kira =

Japanese politician

- 吉良 州司
- Official portrait, 2012

Member of the House of Representatives
- In office 17 December 2014 – 23 January 2026
- Preceded by: Yōichi Anami
- Succeeded by: Hiroaki Eto
- Constituency: Ōita 1st (2014–2017); Kyushu PR (2017–2021); Ōita 1st (2021–2026)
- In office 10 November 2003 – 16 November 2012
- Preceded by: Ban Kugimiya
- Succeeded by: Yōichi Anami
- Constituency: Ōita 1st

Personal details
- Born: 16 March 1958 (age 68) Kusu, Ōita, Japan
- Party: Yūshi no Kai (2021–2026)
- Other political affiliations: Independent (2003–2004; 2020–2021); DPJ (2004–2016); DP (2016–2017); KnT (2017–2018); DPP (2018–2020)
- Education: University of Tokyo

Shuji Kira (吉良 州司, Kira Shūji; born 16 March 1958) is a Japanese politician who served in the House of Representatives in the Diet (the national legislature of Japan), representing Ōita 1st district. He was a member of the Democratic Party of Japan until its dissolution and later Yūshi no Kai. A native of Ōita and graduate of the University of Tokyo, he ran unsuccessfully for the governorship of Ōita Prefecture in 2003. In the same year, he ran for the House of Representatives as an independent and was elected for the first time. After failing to get reelected in 2026, he announced his retirement from politics.
