= Atsushi Suzuki =

Japanese politician (born 1988)

- 鈴木 敦
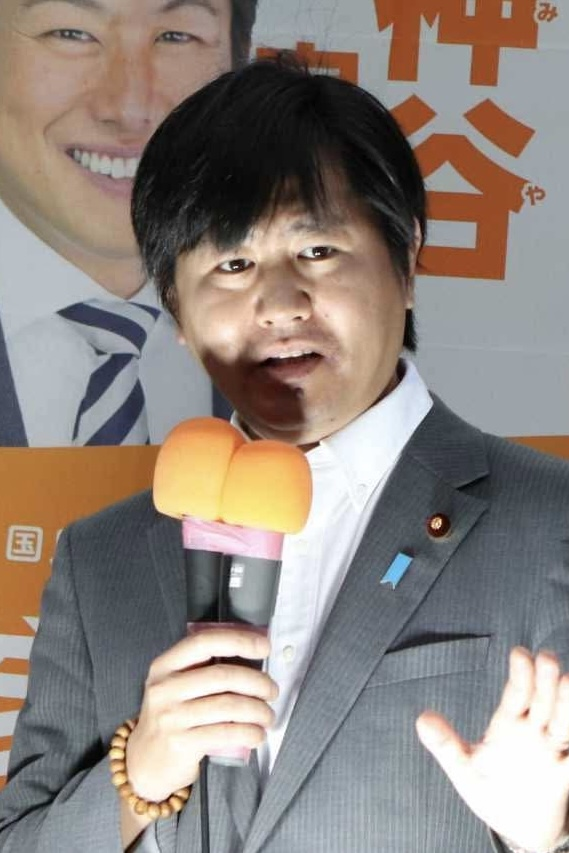
- Atsushi Suzuki in 2025

Member of the House of Representatives
- In office 5 November 2021 – 23 January 2026
- Constituency: Southern Kanto PR

Personal details
- Born: 15 December 1988 (age 37) Kawasaki, Kanagawa, Japan
- Party: Tax Cuts Japan and Yukoku Alliance (since 2026)
- Other political affiliations: LP (2016–2019); DPP (2019–2023); FEFA (2023–2024); Sanseitō (2024–2026)
- Education: Surugadai University (dropped out)
- Website: www.suzuki-atsushi.com

Atsushi Suzuki (鈴木 敦, Suzuki Atsushi; born 15 December 1988) is a Japanese politician who served as a member of the House of Representatives from 2021 to 2026. Suzuki is the fourth youngest member of the National Diet after Yuki Baba, Shin Tsuchida and Nobuchiyo Kishi.

== Early life ==
Suzuki was born in Kawasaki, Kanagawa. After dropping out of Surugadai University, he became a staff member for former House of Representatives member and Liberal Party official Hiro Takayoshi before becoming the staff in charge of the Democratic Party for the People (DPFP) National Diet Task Force.

== Political career ==
In October 2021, it was announced that the DPFP will run Suzuki as the party's candidate in Kanagawa 10th district in the 2021 general election. Partly due to his limited time for campaigning as he became the party's nominee just a few weeks before the election, he lost to Liberal Democratic Party candidate Kazunori Tanaka, but was elected in through the Southern Kanto proportional representation block.

In November 2023, Suzuki alongside 4 other members split from the DPFP to become a founding member of Free Education for All, in which he was appointed as Chairman of the National Assembly Policy Committee.

In the 2024 election, Suzuki ran in the Southern Kanto PR block for the Sanseitō party and held onto his seat.
