= Koriki Jojima =

Japanese politician (born 1947)

- 城島 光力
- Official portrait, 2012

Minister of Finance
- In office 1 October 2012 – 26 December 2012
- Prime Minister: Yoshihiko Noda
- Preceded by: Jun Azumi
- Succeeded by: Tarō Asō

Member of the House of Representatives
- In office 31 August 2009 – 16 November 2012
- Preceded by: Kazunori Tanaka
- Succeeded by: Kazunori Tanaka
- Constituency: Kanagawa 10th
- In office 21 October 1996 – 8 August 2005
- Preceded by: Constituency established
- Succeeded by: Ichirō Kamoshita
- Constituency: Tokyo PR (1996–2003); Tokyo 13th (2003–2005)

Personal details
- Born: Jōjima Masamitsu; 1 January 1947 (age 79) Yanagawa, Fukuoka, Japan
- Party: Democratic
- Other political affiliations: New Frontier (1996–1998); New Fraternity (1998)
- Education: University of Tokyo
- Website: www.jojima.net

Koriki Jojima (城島光力, Jōjima Kōriki; 1 January 1947) is a Japanese politician who served four terms in the House of Representatives and was Minister of Finance from 1 October to 26 December 2012.

== Early life and education ==
Jojima was born in Yanagawa, Fukuoka, on 1 January 1947. He is a graduate of Faculty of Agriculture at the University of Tokyo. He received a bachelor's degree in agronomy in March 1970.

== Career ==
Jojima is the former head of Ajinomoto Workers' Union where he served for about 25 years and also, of Japan Food Industry Workers' Union Council. He then served as a council member of the Japan Productivity Center for Socio-Economic Development. He is a veteran lawmaker. He was first elected to the House of Representatives in 1996 as the number one candidate for the New Frontier Party in the multi-member Tokyo proportional representation block.

Following the dissolution of the New Frontier Party in 1997, Jojima became one of the founding members of the Democratic Party of Japan (DPJ) in 1998. At the 2000 general election he unsuccessfully contested the Tokyo 13th district but retained his seat in the PR block as the DPJ's #2 candidate. In the next election in 2003, he won the Tokyo 13th district, defeating incumbent Ichirō Kamoshita by 2,023 votes. In the 2005 election, Kamoshita regained the seat, defeating Jojima by more than 49,000 votes. This heavy defeat also meant that Jojima was unable to retain a seat in the Diet via the proportional representation block. Jojima returned to the Diet in the 2009 general election, this time contesting the Kanagawa 10th district.

Whilst in the Diet, Jojima served as the parliament affairs chief of the DPJ. He was also a member of committee on fundamental national policies. He was appointed finance minister in a cabinet reshuffle on 1 October 2012, replacing Jun Azumi in the post. It was his first cabinet post. Jojima served in the cabinet led by Prime Minister Yoshihiko Noda until 26 December 2012, and he was replaced by Tarō Asō as finance minister.

At the December 2012 general election, Jojima suffered a defeat at the hands of Kazunori Tanaka, losing by more than 43,000 votes and failing to gain a seat via the Southern Kanto proportional representation block.

=== Views ===
Jojima is known to be a supporter of strong middle class in a society, and he does not endorse excessive competition.

== Personal life ==
His real name is Masamitsu. But, he changed his name as "Koriki" after losing in the 2005 House of Representatives election to make a new start.

Political offices
| Preceded by Jun Azumi | Minister of Finance; 2012 | Succeeded by Tarō Asō |
