= Tokyo 13th district =

Japanese House of Representatives constituency

Tokyo 13th District
- Parliamentary constituency for the Japanese House of Representatives
- Numbered map of inner Tokyo single-member districts
- Prefecture: Tokyo
- Proportional District: Tokyo

Current constituency
- Created: 1994
- Seats: One
- Party: Liberal Democratic
- Representative: Shin Tsuchida
- Wards: Part of Adachi

Tokyo's 13th district is a single-member constituency of the House of Representatives, the lower house of the national Diet of Japan.

It has been held by Shin Tsuchida from the Liberal Democratic Party since 2021.

== List of representatives ==
Election	Representative	Party	Notes
1996	Ichirō Kamoshita	New Frontier	
2000	Ichirō Kamoshita	Liberal Democratic	
2003	Masamitsu Jojima	Democratic	
2005	Ichirō Kamoshita	Liberal Democratic	
2009	Tairo Hirayama	Democratic	(Note: On April 11, 2012, Hirayama submitted a notice of resignation from the party to the Democratic Party in protest at the Noda Cabinet's proposal to gradually raise the Consumption tax. Hirayama became an independent after his resignation from the Party was accepted on May 8. On October 1 of the same year, he joined the People's New Party. On November 26, he left the People's New Party with Shizuka Kamei and joined the formation of Tax Cuts Japan. He had planned to run as a candidate for Tax Cuts Japan from the Kyushu proportional representation block, but he gave up running in the general election because Tax Cuts Japan was dissolved after being absorbed by the Tomorrow Party and the Tomorrow Party did not nominate Hirayama as a candidate.)
2009	Tairo Hirayama	Independent	
2009	Tairo Hirayama	People's New	
2009	Tairo Hirayama	Tax Cuts Japan	
2009	Tairo Hirayama	Independent	
2012	Ichirō Kamoshita	Liberal Democratic	
2014	Ichirō Kamoshita	Liberal Democratic	
2017	Ichirō Kamoshita	Liberal Democratic	
2021	Shin Tsuchida	Liberal Democratic	
2024	Shin Tsuchida	Liberal Democratic	
2026	Shin Tsuchida	Liberal Democratic	

== Election results ==
2026
Party	Candidate	Votes	%	±%
LDP	Shin Tsuchida	94,680	46.6	▲7.0
DPP	Yosuke Mori (elected in Tokyo PR block)	66,140	32.5	▲1.7
JCP	Shingo Sawada	23,371	11.5	▼3.8
Sanseitō	Toshiko Kaji	19,021	9.4	
Registered electors		390,832		
Turnout			54.03	▲3.33
LDP hold				

2024
Party	Candidate	Votes	%	±%
LDP	Shin Tsuchida	75,050	39.62	▼9.69
DPP	Yōsuke Mori (elected in Tokyo PR block)	58,385	30.82	▼2.72
JCP	Shingo Sawada	29,004	15.31	▲2.43
Ishin	Junbei Shigeta	26,989	14.25	
Registered electors		388,211		
Turnout		189,428	50.70	▼0.18
LDP hold				

2021
Party	Candidate	Votes	%	±%
Liberal Democratic (endorsed by Komeito)	Shin Tsuchida	115,669	49.31	
CDP	Tomohiko Kitajo	78,665	33.54	New
Communist	Shingo Sawada	30,204	12.88	
Independent	Hidetaka Watanabe	5,985	2.55	New
Independent	Magomi Hashimoto	4,039	1.72	New
Majority		37,004	15.77	
Registered electors		480,247		
Turnout			50.88	▲3.06
LDP hold				

2017
Party	Candidate	Votes	%	±%
Liberal Democratic (endorsed by Komeito)	Ichirō Kamoshita (incumbent)	120,744	55.23	
CDP	Tomohiko Kitajo	67,070	30.68	New
Communist	Motoki Sobue	30,807	14.09	
Majority		53,674	24.55	
Registered electors		472,423		
Turnout			47.82	▼2.14
LDP hold				

2014
Party	Candidate	Votes	%	±%
Liberal Democratic (endorsed by Komeito)	Ichirō Kamoshita (incumbent)	113,036	55.55	
Democratic	Takako Hasegawa	43,028	21.14	
Communist	Motoki Sobue	35,518	17.45	
Future Generations	Tomoyuki Wada	11,915	5.86	New
Majority		70,008	34.41	
Registered electors		422,015		
Turnout			49.96	▼7.32
LDP hold				

2012
Party	Candidate	Votes	%	±%
Liberal Democratic (endorsed by Komeito)	Ichirō Kamoshita (PR seat incumbent)	115,797	50.31	
Restoration	Hiroshi Kawaguchi	46,947	20.40	New
Democratic (endorsed by PNP)	Naoki Fujio	26,438	11.49	
Communist	Motoki Sobue	23,091	10.03	
Tomorrow	Masaki Honda	17,906	7.78	New
Majority		68,850	29.91	
Registered electors		418,668		
Turnout			57.28	▼5.54
LDP gain from Independent				

2009
Party	Candidate	Votes	%	±%
Democratic (endorsed by PNP)	Tairo Hirayama	114,653	44.90	
Liberal Democratic (endorsed by Komeito)	Ichirō Kamoshita (incumbent) (won PR seat)	111,590	43.70	
Communist	Shuji Watanabe	26,259	10.28	
Happiness Realization	Kazumasa Fujiyama	2,873	1.13	New
Majority		3,063	1.20	
Registered electors		414,724		
Turnout			62.82	▲1.27
Democratic gain from LDP				

2005
Party	Candidate	Votes	%	±%
Liberal Democratic	Ichirō Kamoshita (PR seat incumbent)	129,586	53.82	
Democratic	Masamitsu Jojima (incumbent)	80,378	33.38	
Communist	Tomoko Tamura	30,806	12.79	
Majority		49,208	20.44	
Turnout			61.55	
LDP gain from Democratic				

2003
Party	Candidate	Votes	%	±%
Democratic	Masamitsu Jojima (PR seat incumbent)	90,277	43.58	
Liberal Democratic	Ichirō Kamoshita (incumbent) (won PR seat)	88,254	42.61	
Communist	Tomoko Tamura	28,605	13.81	
Majority		2,023	0.97	
Turnout				
Democratic gain from LDP				

2000
Party	Candidate	Votes	%	±%
Liberal Democratic	Ichirō Kamoshita (incumbent)	90,567	42.04	
Democratic	Masamitsu Jojima (PR seat incumbent) (won PR seat)	52,996	24.60	New
Communist	Rikukai Sasaki (PR seat incumbent)	48,349	22.44	
Liberal	Hideyuki Hayami	23,526	10.92	New
Majority		37,571	17.44	
Turnout				
LDP hold				

1996
Party	Candidate	Votes	%	±%
New Frontier	Ichirō Kamoshita	70,697	35.02	New
Liberal Democratic	Nobuyoshi Kondo	65,191	32.30	New
Communist	Kenichi Suzuki	41,918	20.77	New
Democratic	Kikuko Suzuki	24,044	11.91	New
Majority		5,506	2.72	
Turnout				
New Frontier win (new seat)				
