= Kanagawa 10th district =

Legislative district of Japan

Kanagawa 10th District
- 神奈川県第10区
- Parliamentary constituency for the Japanese House of Representatives
- Parliamentary constituencies in Kanagawa Prefecture

- Detailed map of parliamentary constituencies in Yokohama city
- Prefecture: Kanagawa
- Proportional Block: Southern Kanto
- Electorate: 330,552 (as of September 2023)

Current constituency
- Created: 1994
- Seats: One
- Party: LDP
- Representatives: Kazunori Tanaka

Kanagawa 10th district (神奈川[県第]10区, Kanagawa[-ken dai-]jikku) is a single-member electoral district for the House of Representatives, the lower house of the National Diet of Japan. It is located in Kanagawa Prefecture and consists of Kawasaki and Saiwai Wards of Kawasaki City. In of September 2011, 494,755 voters were registered in the district, giving its voters the second lowest vote weight in the country behind Chiba 4th district. In redistricting in 2022 all areas of Nakahara Ward were transferred to the 18th district.

After the introduction of single-member districts, Kanagawa 10th district went narrowly to NFP Representative Eiji Nagai who had represented the pre-reform five-member Kanagawa 2nd district for the Japan New Party since 1993. Nagai became a Democrat in the wake of the NFP dissolution, but lost the district to Liberal Democrat Kazunori Tanaka (Yamasaki faction). Tanaka who became Senior Vice Minister during the Koizumi and First Abe Cabinets held onto the 10th district until the landslide election of 2009 when he lost to Democrat Kōriki Jōjima (Kawabata group=ex-DSP faction) who had been a representative from Tokyo (under his real name Masamitsu Jōjima) between 1996 and 2005. Jōjima went on to become a minister of state in the Noda Cabinet in 2011. In 2012, he was voted out of the House of Representatives alongside seven other sitting ministers in the Noda Cabinet. Tanaka was again appointed as a Senior Vice Minister in the Second Abe Cabinet.

== List of representatives ==
Representative	Party	Dates	Notes
Eiji Nagai	NFP	1996–2000	Joined Kokumin no Koe ("Voice of the People"), Minseitō ("Democratic" or "Civil Government Party"), Minshutō ("Democratic Party") in the NFP dissolution Re-elected in the Southern Kantō PR block
Kazunori Tanaka	LDP	2000–2009	Re-elected by PR
Kōriki Jōjima	DPJ	2009–2012	Failed re-election by PR
Kazunori Tanaka	LDP	2012–	Incumbent

== Election results ==
x

2026
Party	Candidate	Votes	%	±%
LDP	Kazunori Tanaka	59,967	36.1	▲1.5
Ishin	Ryūna Kanamura (elected by PR))	40,298	24,2	▼6.7
DPP	Shōhei Yamaguchi	34,094	20.5	
JCP	Toshihiro Nakano	16,666	10.0	▼0.7
Sanseitō	Kimio Hashimoto	15,191	9.1	
Registered electors		331,578		
Turnout			52.01	▲0.28
LDP hold				

2024
Party	Candidate	Votes	%	±%
LDP	Kazunori Tanaka	57,380	34.6	▼6.8
Ishin	Ryūna Kanamura (elected by PR))	51,121	30.9	▲3.4
CDP	Mitsutaka Suzuki	39,409	23.8	
JCP	Susumu Katayanagi	17,700	10.7	▼8.6
Registered electors		330,442		
Turnout			51,73	▼3.31
LDP hold				

2021
Party	Candidate	Votes	%	±%
LDP	Kazunori Tanaka	104,832	41.39	
Ishin	Ryūna Kanamura (elected by PR)	69,594	27.48	
JCP	Kimie Hatano	48,839	19.28	
DPP	Atsushi Suzuki (elected by PR)	30,013	11.85	
Turnout			55.04	▲5.19

2012
Party	Candidate	Votes	%	±%
LDP – Kōmeitō	Kazunori Tanaka	104,994	37.5	
DPJ – PNP	Kōriki Jōjima	61,255	21.9	
YP	Eiichirō Kume	44,493	15.9	
JRP	Teruhisa Ishikawa	44,185	15.8	
JCP	Toshihiro Nakano	25,310	9.0	

2009
Party	Candidate	Votes	%	±%
DPJ – PNP	Kōriki Jōjima	152,921	49.3	
LDP – Kōmeitō	Kazunori Tanaka (elected by PR)	118,641	38.2	
JCP	Takashi Kasaki	33,134	10.7	
HRP	Ryūichi Shimazaki	5,746	1.9	
Turnout		317163	65.46	

2005
Party	Candidate	Votes	%	±%
LDP	Kazunori Tanaka	160,669	56.4	
DPJ	Keikō Hakariya	89,025	31.3	
JCP	Takashi Kasaki	34,971	12.3	
Turnout		291,800	64.41	

2003
Party	Candidate	Votes	%	±%
LDP	Kazunori Tanaka	114,766	48.1	
DPJ	Keikō Hakariya (elected by PR)	89,752	37.6	
JCP	Takashi Kasaki	34,003	14.3	
Turnout		246,726	55.62	

2000
Party	Candidate	Votes	%	±%
LDP	Kazunori Tanaka	94,183	39.6	
DPJ	Eiji Nagai (elected by PR)	87,775	36.9	
JCP	Takashi Kasaki	48,812	20.5	
LL	Kengo Kanehira	7,180	3.0	

1996
Party	Candidate	Votes	%	±%
NFP	Eiji Nagai	70,276	31.2	
LDP	Kazunori Tanaka (elected by PR)	68,892	30.6	
JCP	Masahiro Nakaji (elected by PR)	48,488	21.5	
DPJ	Hisashi Shibata	35,101	15.6	
LL	Nobuaki Iwaki	2,406	1.1	
Turnout		230,812	54.79	
