= Talk show =

Type of broadcast show centered around conversation

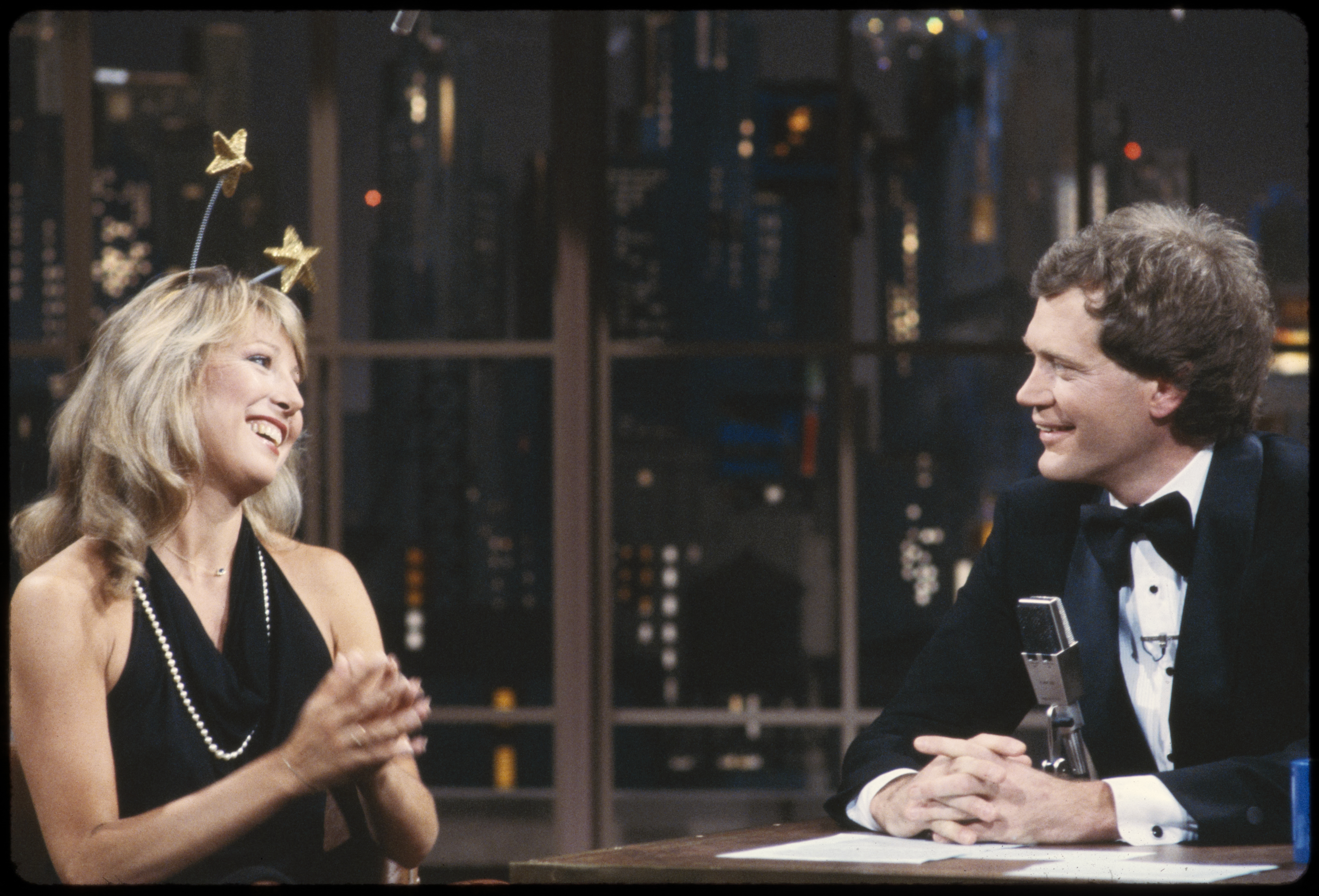
David Letterman interviewing Teri Garr on Late Night with David Letterman in 1982

A talk show or chat show is a television programming, radio programming and podcast genre structured around the act of spontaneous conversation. In a talk show, one person (or group of people or guests) discusses various topics put forth by a talk show host. This discussion can be in the form of an interview or a simple conversation about important social, political or religious issues and events. The personality of the host shapes the tone and style of the show. A common feature or unwritten rule of talk shows is to be based on "fresh talk", which is talk that is spontaneous or has the appearance of spontaneity.

The talk show originated in the United States in the early 1950s. Talk shows can also have several different sub-genres, which all have unique material and can air at different times of the day via different avenues.

== Attributes ==
Beyond the inclusion of a host, a guest or guests, and a studio or call-in audience, specific attributes of talk shows may be identified:

- Talk shows focus on the viewers—including the participants calling in, sitting in a studio or viewing from online or on TV.
- Talk shows center around the interaction of guests with opposing opinions and/or differing levels of expertise, which include both experts and non-experts.
- Although talk shows include guests of various expertise levels, they often cater to the credibility of one's life experiences as opposed to educational expertise.
- Talk shows involve a host responsible for furthering the agenda of the show by mediating, instigating and directing the conversation to ensure the purpose is fulfilled. The purpose of talk shows is to either address or bring awareness to conflicts, to provide information, or to entertain.
- Talk shows consist of evolving episodes that focus on differing perspectives in respect to important issues in society, politics, religion or other popular areas.
- Talk shows are produced at low cost and are typically not aired during prime time.
- Talks shows are either aired live or are recorded live with limited post-production editing.

== Subgenres ==
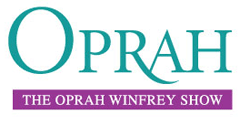
Oprah Winfrey made the tabloid talk show popular.

There are several major formats of talk shows. Generally, each subgenre predominates during a specific programming block during the broadcast day.

- Breakfast chat or early morning shows that generally alternate between news summaries, political coverage, feature stories, celebrity interviews, and musical performances.
- Late morning chat shows that feature two or more hosts or a celebrity panel and focus on entertainment and lifestyle features.
- Daytime tabloid talk shows that generally feature a host, a guest or a panel of guests, and a live audience that interacts extensively with the host and guests. These shows may feature celebrities, political commentators, or "ordinary" people who present unusual or controversial topics.
- "Lifestyle" or self-help programs that generally feature a host or hosts of medical practitioners, therapists, or counselors and guests who seek intervention, describe medical or psychological problems, or offer advice. An example of this type of subgenre is The Oprah Winfrey Show, although it can easily fit into other categories as well.

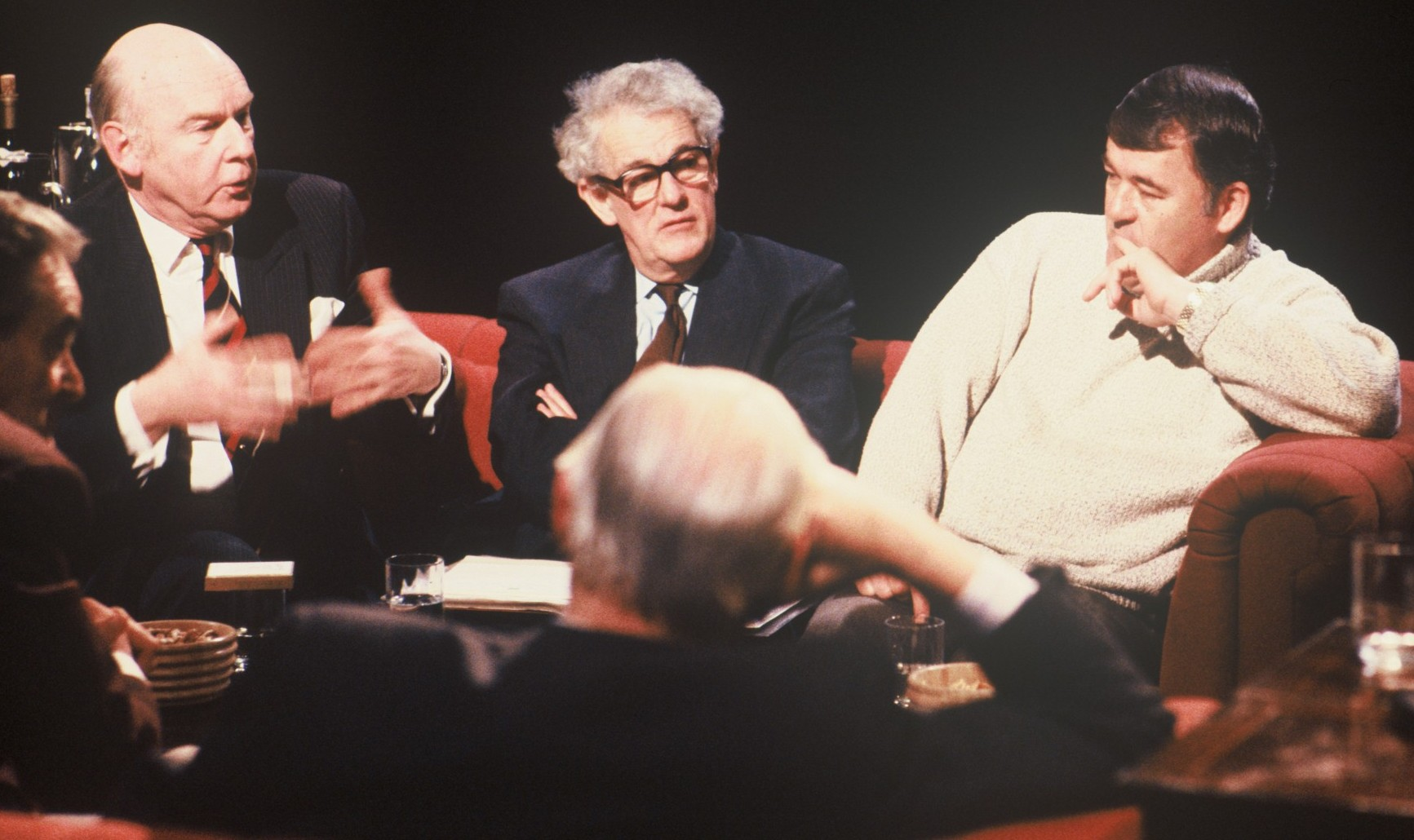
After Dark

- Evening panel discussion shows that focus on news, politics, or popular culture (such as the former British series After Dark, which was broadcast "late-night").
- Late-night talk shows that focus primarily on topical comedy and variety entertainment. Most traditionally open with a monologue by the host, with jokes relating to current events. Other segments typically include interviews with celebrity guests, recurring comedy sketches, as well as performances by musicians or other stand-up comics.
- Sunday morning talk shows are a staple of network programming in North America and generally focus on political news and interviews with elected political figures and candidates for office, commentators, and journalists.
- Aftershows that feature in-depth discussion about a program on the same network that aired just before (for example, Talking Dead).
- Spoof talk shows, such as Space Ghost Coast to Coast, Tim and Eric Nite Live!, Comedy Bang! Bang!, and The Eric Andre Show, that feature interviews that are mostly scripted, shown in a humorous and satirical way, or engages in subverting the norms of the format (particularly that of late-night talk shows).

These formats are not absolute; some afternoon programs have similar structures to late-night talk shows. These formats may vary across different countries or markets. Late night talk shows are especially significant in the United States. Breakfast television is a staple of British television. The daytime talk format has become popular in Hispanic America countries as well as the United States.

These genres also do not represent "generic" talk show genres. "Generic" genres are categorized based on the audiences' social views of talks shows derived through their cultural identities, fondness, preferences and character judgements of the talk shows in question. The subgenres listed above are based on television programming and broadly defined based on the TV guide rather than on the more specific categorizations of talk show viewers. However, there is a lack of research on "generic" genres, making it difficult to list them here. According to Mittell, "generic" genres is of significant importance in further identifying talk show genres because with such differentiation in cultural preferences within the subgenres, a further distinction of genres would better represent and target the audience.

The American talk-radio host Howard Stern also hosted a talk show that was syndicated nationally in the US, then moved to satellite radio's Sirius. The tabloid talk show genre, pioneered by Phil Donahue in 1967 but popularized by Oprah Winfrey, was extremely popular during the last two decades of the 20th century.

Politics are hardly the only subject of American talk shows, however. Other radio talk show subjects include Car Talk hosted by NPR and Coast to Coast AM hosted by Art Bell and George Noory which discusses topics of the paranormal, conspiracy theories, and fringe science. Sports talk shows are also very popular ranging from high-budget shows like The Best Damn Sports Show Period to Max Kellerman's original public-access television cable TV show Max on Boxing.

== History ==
Talk shows have been broadcast on television since the earliest days of the medium. Faye Emerson was the first talk show host, with the Faye Emerson show on CBS in October 1949, though often disregarded in favour of her male contemporaries. Then, Joe Franklin in the United States hosted his first television talk show. The show began in 1951 on WJZ-TV (later WABC-TV) and moved to WOR-TV (later WWOR-TV) from 1962 to 1993.

NBC's The Tonight Show in the United States is the world's longest-running talk show; having debuted in 1954, it continues to this day. The show underwent some minor title changes until settling on its current title in 1962, and despite a brief foray into a more news-style program in 1957 and then reverting that same year, it has remained a talk show. The Late Late Show in Ireland is the second-longest-running talk show in television history, and the longest running talk show in Europe, having debuted in 1962.

Steve Allen was the first host of The Tonight Show, which began as a local New York show, being picked up by the NBC network in 1954. It in turn had evolved from his late-night radio talk show in Los Angeles. Allen pioneered the format of late night network TV talk shows, originating such talk show staples as an opening monologue, celebrity interviews, audience participation, and comedy bits in which cameras were taken outside the studio, as well as music, although the series' popularity was cemented by its second host, Jack Paar, who took over after Allen had left and the show had ceased to exist.

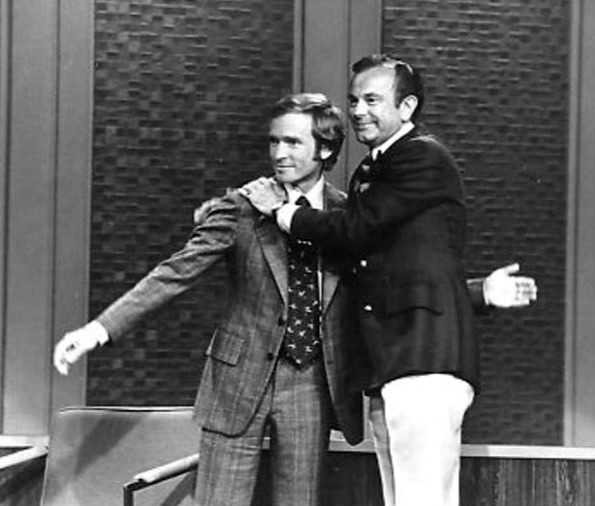
Dick Cavett and Jack Paar

The American TV news pioneer Edward R. Murrow hosted a talk show entitled Small World in the late 1950s and since then, political TV talk shows have predominantly aired on Sunday mornings.

Syndicated daily talk shows began to gain more popularity during the mid-1970s and reached their height of popularity with the rise of the tabloid talk show. Morning talk shows gradually replaced earlier forms of programming — there were a plethora of morning game shows during the 1960s and early to mid-1970s, and some stations formerly showed a morning movie in the time slot that many talk shows now occupy.

Current late-night talk shows such as The Tonight Show Starring Jimmy Fallon, Conan and The Late Show with Stephen Colbert have aired featuring celebrity guests and comedy sketches. Syndicated daily talk shows range from tabloid talk shows, such as Jerry Springer and Maury, to celebrity interview shows, like Live with Kelly and Ryan, Tamron Hall, Sherri, Steve Wilkos, The Jennifer Hudson Show and The Kelly Clarkson Show, to The Oprah Winfrey Show, which popularized the former genre and has been evolving towards the latter. On November 10, 2010, Oprah Winfrey invited several of the most prominent American talk show hosts - Phil Donahue, Sally Jessy Raphael, Geraldo Rivera, Ricki Lake, and Montel Williams - to join her as guests on her show. The 1990s in particular saw a spike in the number of "tabloid" talk shows, most of which were short-lived and are now replaced by a more universally appealing "interview" or "lifestyle TV" format.

The current world record for the longest talk show is held by Rabi Lamichhane from Nepal by staying on air for 62 hours from April 11 to 13, 2013, breaking the previous record set by two Ukrainians by airing the show for 52 hours in 2011.

In 2020, the fear of the spread of COVID-19 led to large changes in the operation of talk shows, with many being filmed without live audiences to ensure adherence to the rules of social distancing. The inclusion of a live, participating audience is one of the attributes that contribute to the defining characteristics of talk shows. Operating without the interaction of viewers created difficult moments and awkward silences to hosts who usually used audience responses to transition conversations.

== Talk shows around the world ==
=== Japan ===
Tetsuko Kuroyanagi

Tetsuko's Room (徹子の部屋, Tetsuko no Heya) is a talk show hosted by Tetsuko Kuroyanagi and broadcast on TV Asahi from February 2, 1976, every Monday to Friday from 13:00 to 13:30 (JST). It is a long-lived program, and as of 2022, it has been broadcast for 46 years and more than 11,000 times, repeatedly winning Guinness World Records. Other talk shows include Nichiyō Tōron (1994 onwards), Ametalk! (2003 onwards) and Takeda Tetsuya no Shōwa wa kagayaiteita (2013 onwards).

In Japan, panel shows called tōku bangumi (トーク番組) are commonplace, accounting for about 30% of daytime and primetime programming on the four main television stations. Due to language and cultural differences, Japanese TV stations could not freely use syndicated programs (mostly from Europe and North America) and therefore turned to panel shows, which could be produced cheaply and easily, to fill time during daytime programming.

Japanese panel shows are distinct in generally not employing regular panelists but instead having a panel made up of different freelance comedians and celebrities each program, although the program is generally hosted by the same compere. Talk shows evolved in tandem with the Japanese variety show and it is very common for talk shows to borrow variety elements, typically by having celebrity guests attempt some kind of amusingly incongruous activity. Often, one of the guests will be a gaijin tarento (foreign talent) in order to provide comedy or to comment on matters related to Western culture. Comedic material is commonly written and rehearsed before tapings with or without a live audience.

=== South Korea and Taiwan ===
Korean and Taiwanese talk shows have used the panel format similar to Japanese programs and rely on famous celebrities and comedic banter than topics. Their programs often shorten interviews from lengthy tapings.

=== Nepal ===
Rabi Lamichhane from Nepal previously held the Guinness World Record for longest talk show, continuously broadcasting for 62 hours in April 2013.

=== Brazil ===
In Brazil, Jô Soares inaugurated the genre with Jô Soares Onze e Meia ("Jô Soares Eleven Thirty") from 1988 to 1999 on SBT. In 2000, Soares took his show's format to TV Globo, where it was then called Programa do Jô, and was broadcast until 2016. Jô's main competitors at the time were Danilo Gentili and Fábio Porchat.

=== China ===
In 1999, Speak Up, hosted by Ma Dong, son of the famous Chinese comedian Ma Ji, was born as an early talk show "chatting" about a variety of sharp topics related to people's livelihoods, the state system, and power structures. The show was eventually taken off the air as a direct result of the last episode of "Approaching Homosexuality."

In 2012, Dragon Television created a new high-end cultural, American-style talk show called Tonight 80's Talk Show; it is hosted by the comedian Wang Zijian, showing young people's attitudes and thoughts on social hotspots, cultural events, and fashion trends.

== See also ==
- Talk radio
