= Free Education For All =

Former political party in Japan

Free Education For All 教育無償化を実現する会 Kyōiku mushō-ka o jitsugen suru Kai
- Abbreviation: FEFA
- Leader: Seiji Maehara
- Deputy Leader: Yukiko Kada
- Secretary General: Hisashi Tokunaga
- Founded: 30 November 2023
- Dissolved: 3 October 2024
- Split from: Democratic Party for the People
- Merged into: Nippon Ishin no Kai
- Ideology: Moderate conservatism; Free education
- Colors: Blue

Website
- fefa-japan.jp

Free Education For All (Japanese: 教育無償化を実現する会, Kyōiku mushō-ka o jitsugen suru Kai, lit. "Party to Realize Free Education") was a political party in Japan founded in 2023 by former members of the Democratic Party for the People.

The party advocated for free education, raising the minimum wage, welfare policies and constitutional revision.

== History ==
Seiji Maehara and several in the Democratic Party for the People (DPP) have criticized DPP leader Yuichiro Tamaki for aligning their party to the ruling Liberal Democratic Party, particularly in cooperation between both parties on legislation, which Maehara strongly disapproves. In November 2023, the DPP supported the LDP's supplementary budget for the fiscal year 2024 aimed at financing the latest economic stimulus package advocated by the Kishida cabinet.

On 30 November 2023, Maehara in a press conference announced that he, alongside four other members (Yukiko Kada, Hisashi Tokunaga, Alex Saito and Atsushi Suzuki) would resign as members of the DPP and form Free Education For All. Maehara expressed his intentions to cooperate with Japan's opposition parties in order to "create an option for a change of government." He repeatedly criticized his old party, the DPP for its cooperative nature with the LDP. On 13 December 2023, the DPP decided to officially expel Maehara and the four other members from the party. The DPP also demanded Saito and Suzuki, who were elected through proportional representation, resign as members of the House of Representatives as they had initially won their seats through the party. On 3 October 2024, the party merged into Nippon Ishin no Kai, with all, but Atsushi Suzuki, running under the Ishin banner.

== Ideology, platform and policy ==
The party described itself as pacifist, constitutionalist, reformist and for popular sovereignty. The party's leader, Maehara stated that he aspires to play a role in bringing together Japan's opposition parties against the LDP, similar to what former Prime Minister Morihiro Hosokawa accomplished in successfully forming a coalition in the aftermath of the 1993 general election.

In a Sankei Shimbun article, the party published its manifesto which included the following pledges:

- Increase investment in education, science, and technology, and make education free of charge.
- Establish a scholarship system to support students and young people.
- Emphasize social support for raising children and reduce financial burden.
- Eliminate unreasonable disparities through fair redistribution and establish a sustainable economy.
- Overcome declining birthrate, aging population, and depopulation for secure social security.
- Stand by marginalized groups like children, young people, social minorities, and people with disabilities.
- Advance regional sovereignty reform for independent, vibrant regions.
- Protect constitutionalism, popular sovereignty, fundamental human rights, and pacifism.
- Maintain a pacifist defense policy.
- Aim for open national interests, broad human security, lasting peace, and nuclear disarmament.

== Leadership ==
Position	Name
Leader	Seiji Maehara
Deputy leader	Yukiko Kada
Secretary-General	Hisashi Tokunaga
Chairman of Political Affairs Research	Alex Saito
Chairman of the National Assembly Policy Committee	Atsushi Suzuki

=== List of leaders ===
No.	Leader (birth–death)	Constituency	Took office	Left office	Prime Minister (term)
Split from: Democratic Party For the People
1	Seiji Maehara (b. 1962)	Rep for Kyoto 2nd	30 November 2023	3 October 2024	Kishida 2021–2024
1	Seiji Maehara (b. 1962)	Rep for Kyoto 2nd	30 November 2023	3 October 2024	Ishiba 2024
