= Shin Tsuchida =

Japanese politician

- 土田 慎
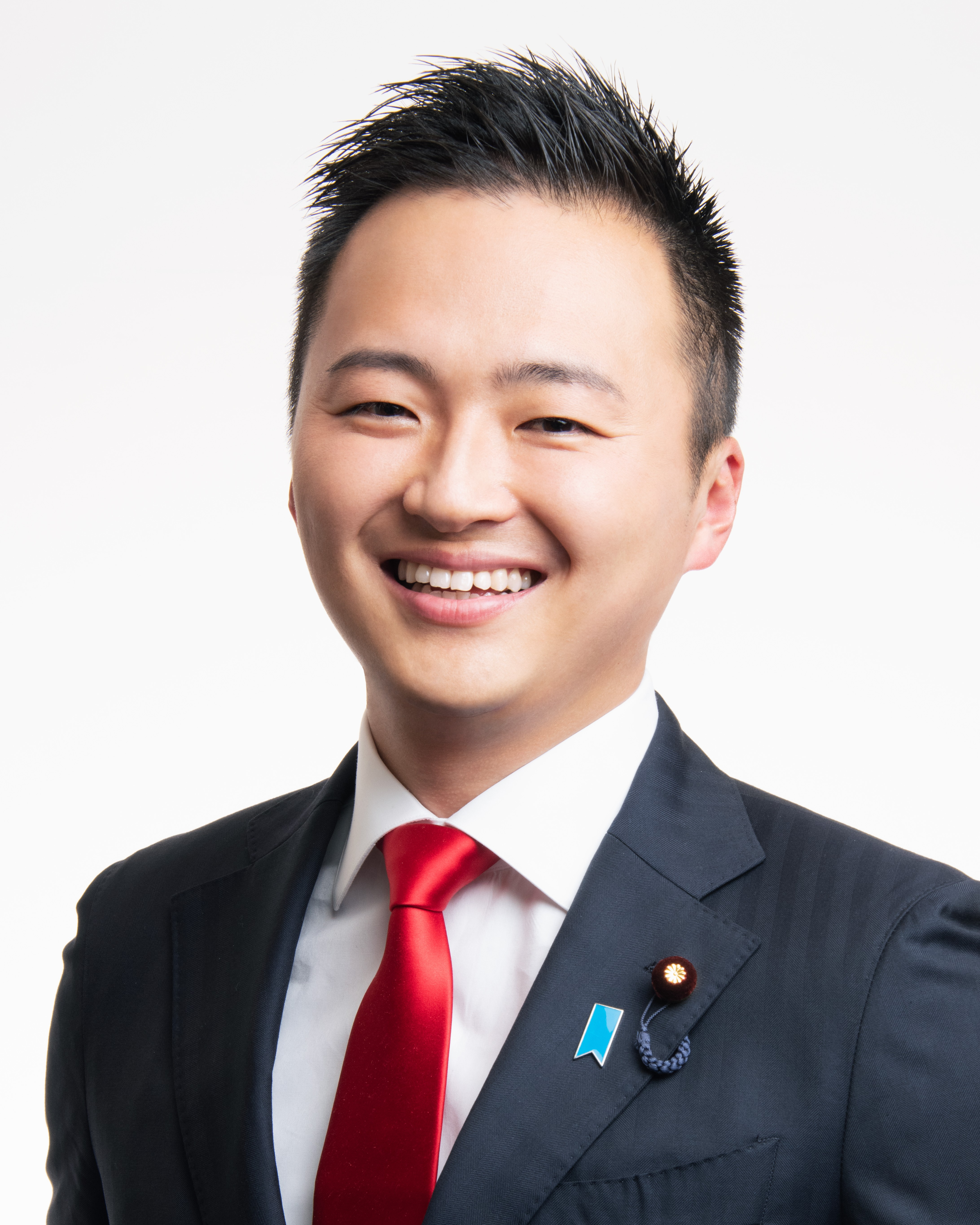
- Official portrait, 2023

Member of the House of Representatives
- Incumbent
- Assumed office 31 October 2021
- Preceded by: Ichirō Kamoshita
- Constituency: Tokyo 13th

Personal details
- Born: 30 October 1990 (age 35) Chigasaki, Kanagawa, Japan
- Party: Liberal Democratic
- Education: Kyoto University

Shin Tsuchida (born 30 October 1990) is a Japanese politician from the Liberal Democratic Party who has represented Tokyo's 13th district in the House of Representatives since 2021.

He is the first member of the National Diet who was born in the Heisei era along with Yuki Baba.

== Early life and career ==
Tsuchida was born in Chigasaki, Kanagawa Prefecture. He studied economics at Kyoto University and joined Recruit Lifestyle (now Recruit) after graduating. After working as a secretary to a member of the House of Representatives, he served as secretary to the President of the House of Councillors, Akiko Santō, and as a public secretary.

== Political career ==
Tsuchida ran for the House of Representatives in the 2021 election endorsed by the Liberal Democratic Party. He was elected to the Tokyo 13th district as the successor to Ichirō Kamoshita.

On 15 September 2023, he became Parliamentary Vice-Minister of Digital Affairs and Parliamentary Vice-Minister of Cabinet Office (in charge of administrative reform and regulatory reform) in the Second Kishida Cabinet.

Tsuchida supported Digital Minister Taro Kono in the 2024 LDP presidential election, which Shigeru Ishiba ultimately won. Tsuchida was re-elected in the 2024 election subsequently called by Ishiba in October, defeating Yosuke Mori of the Democratic Party for the People (Mori was elected through proportional representation). In November of the same year, he was appointed Parliamentary Vice-Minister of Finance in the Second Ishiba Cabinet.
