= Ichirō Kamoshita =

Japanese politician

- 鴨下 一郎
- Official portrait, 2007

Minister of the Environment
- In office 27 August 2007 – 2 August 2008
- Prime Minister: Shinzo Abe; Yasuo Fukuda
- Preceded by: Masatoshi Wakabayashi
- Succeeded by: Tetsuo Saito

Member of the House of Representatives; from Tokyo
- In office 18 July 1993 – 14 October 2021
- Preceded by: Rikyū Shibusawa
- Succeeded by: Shin Tsuchida
- Constituency: See list: 10th district (1993–1996); 13th district (1996–2003); PR block (2003–2005); 13th district (2005–2009); PR block (2009–2012); 13th district (2012–2021)

Personal details
- Born: 16 January 1949 (age 77) Adachi, Tokyo, Japan
- Party: Liberal Democratic
- Other political affiliations: JNP (1993–1994); NFP (1994–1997)
- Education: Nihon University

Ichirō Kamoshita (鴨下 一郎, Kamoshita Ichirō; born 16 January 1949) is a Japanese politician and doctor, who served as Minister of the Environment in Yasuo Fukuda's cabinet.

Born in Adachi, Tokyo, he graduated from Nihon University, earning a medical degree. In 1993, he was elected for the first time as a member of the Japan New Party. In December 1997, he joined the Liberal Democratic Party. He represented Tokyo's 13th district in the House of Representatives.
