= Minimum wage in Japan =

最低賃金法 (Minimum Wage Act)
- Territorial extent: Japan, minimum wage varies by prefecture
- Passed: February 19, 1959
- Effective: On August 12, 1959, the first minimum wage based on the Minimum Wage Act was implemented in Shizuoka Prefecture.

Legislative history
- Introduced: April 15, 1959
- Status: Amended

Japan's minimum wage depends on the region and industry. Industrial minimum wages apply for certain industries and are usually set higher than the regional minimum. If regional and industrial minimum wages differ, the higher of the two applies.

In Japan, the minimum wage is revised on a fiscal year basis, running from April to March. Even during periods of deflation, the minimum wage has steadily increased. Based on the national weighted average, it was ¥668 in 2005, ¥730 in 2010, ¥798 in 2015, ¥902 in 2020, and ¥1,055 in 2024. In 2025, it is scheduled to rise to ¥1,121, marking the largest increase in the country's history.

As of late August 2026, the lowest minimum wage in South Japan exists in the Kumamoto prefecture at ¥1,016 an hour (6.39 U.S. dollars), while the highest minimum wage is in Tokyo at ¥1,226 an hour (7.71 U.S. dollars).

The cost of commuting, extra pay (such as working on holidays, at night, overtime, etc.) and temporary pays (bonus, tips, etc.) must be paid exclusively and cannot be used to calculate towards the minimum wage. Regional minimum hourly wages are set by the Minister of Labour or the Chief of the Prefectural Labour Standards Office. Recommendations are made by the Minimum Wage Council.

View chart definition.
Japan's minimum wage rate over time, Weighted national average

== History of Minimum wage in Japan ==
Year	Hourly Range	Average Hourly	Remarks
Oct 2020		¥902	
Oct 2021		¥930	
Oct 2022		¥958	
Oct 2023		¥1,004	
Oct 2024		¥1,055	
Oct 2025	¥1,023 ~ ¥1,226	¥1,121	
