= 2024 Japanese general election =

- 27 October 2024

All 465 seats in the House of Representatives 233 seats needed for a majority
- Opinion polls
- Registered: 103,880,749 (▼1.39%)
- Turnout: 53.84% (▼2.13pp; Const. votes); 53.84% (▼2.14pp; PR votes)
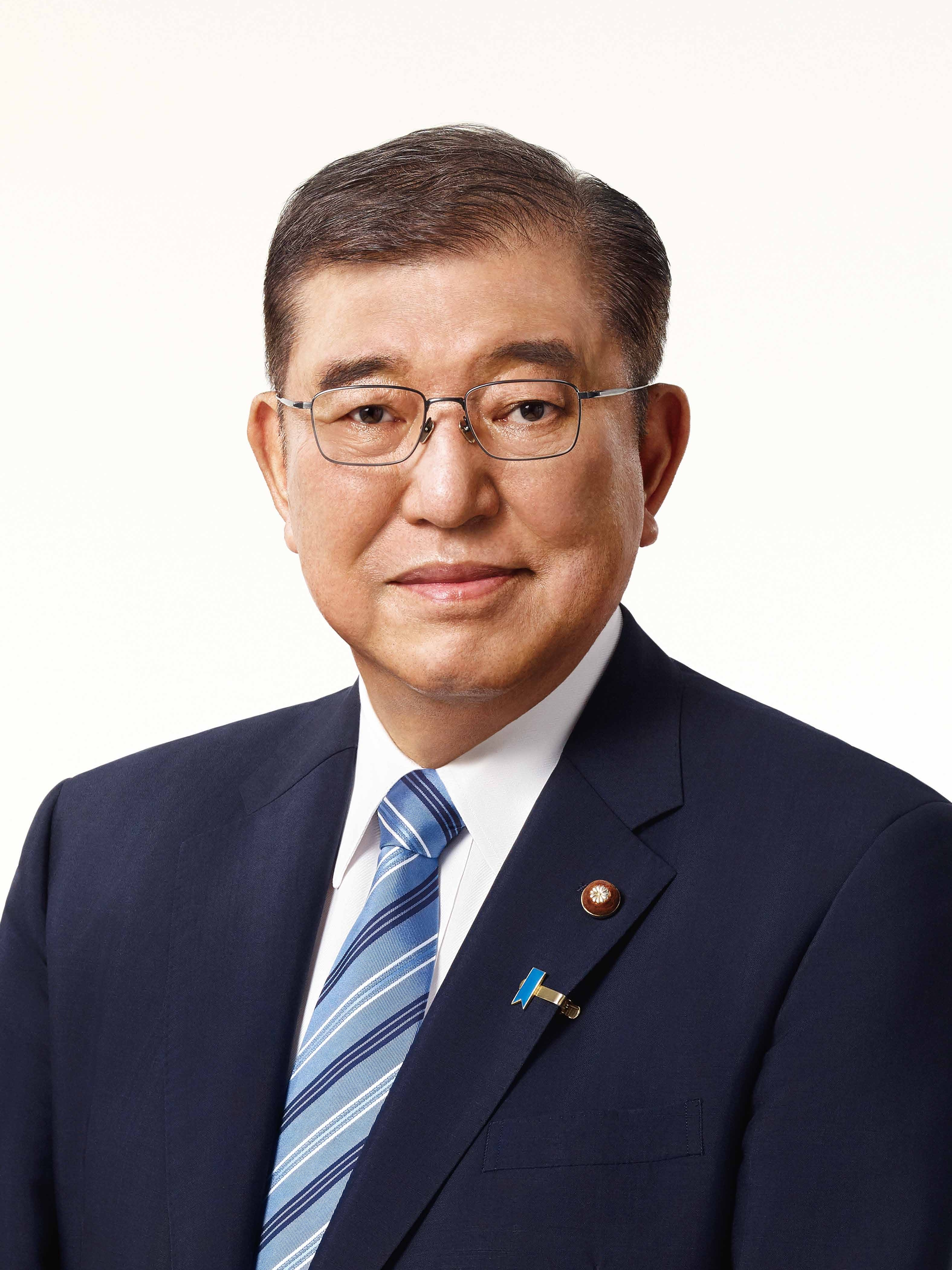

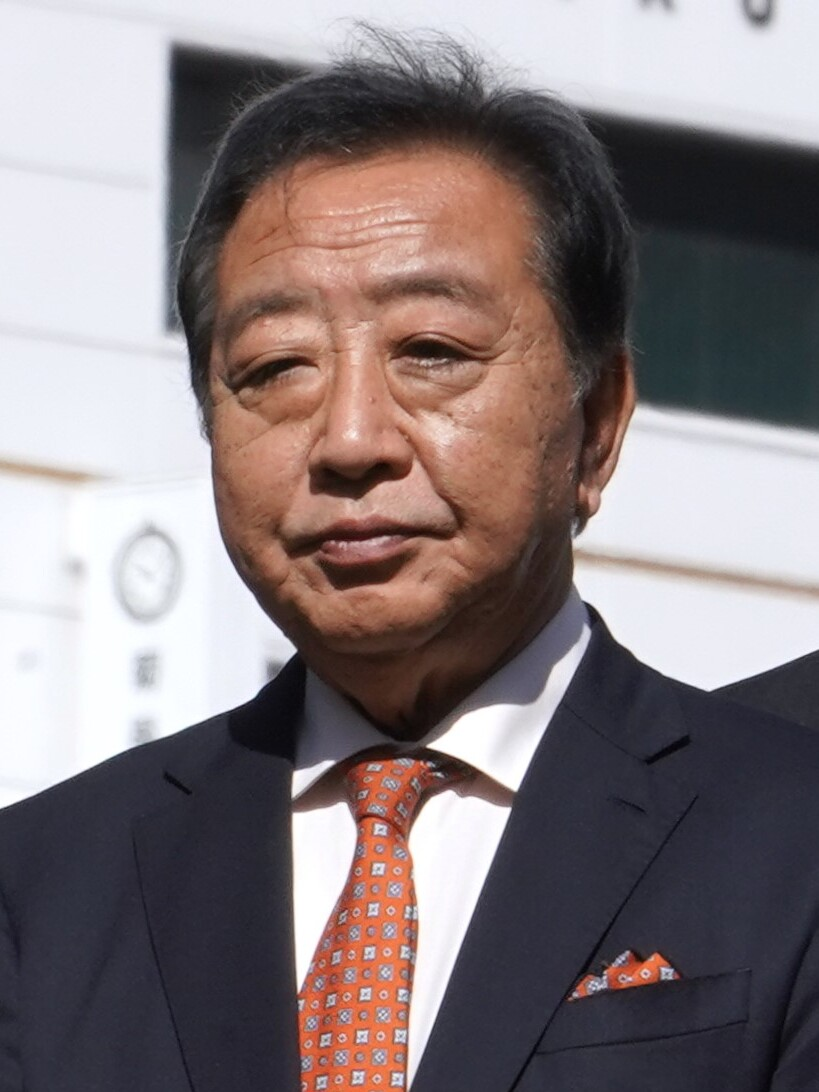

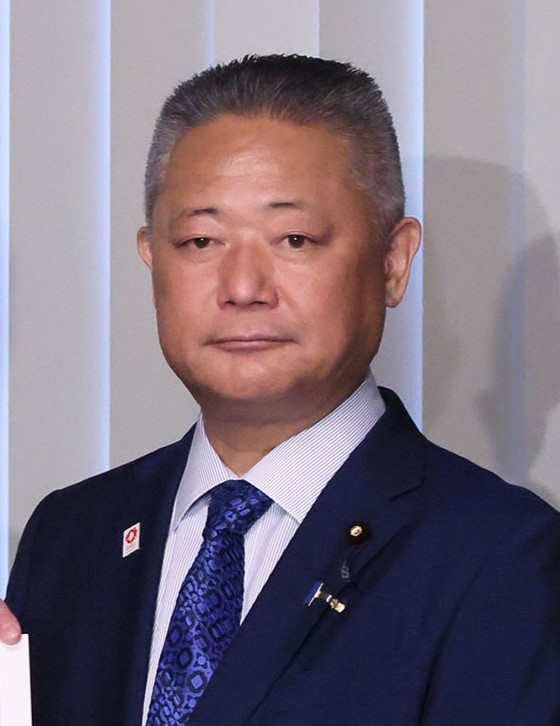

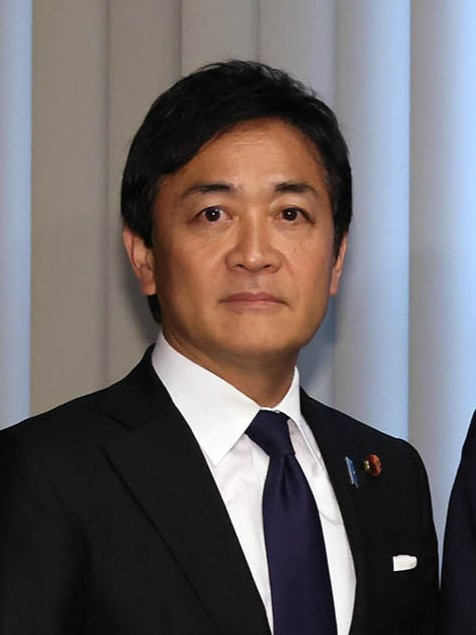

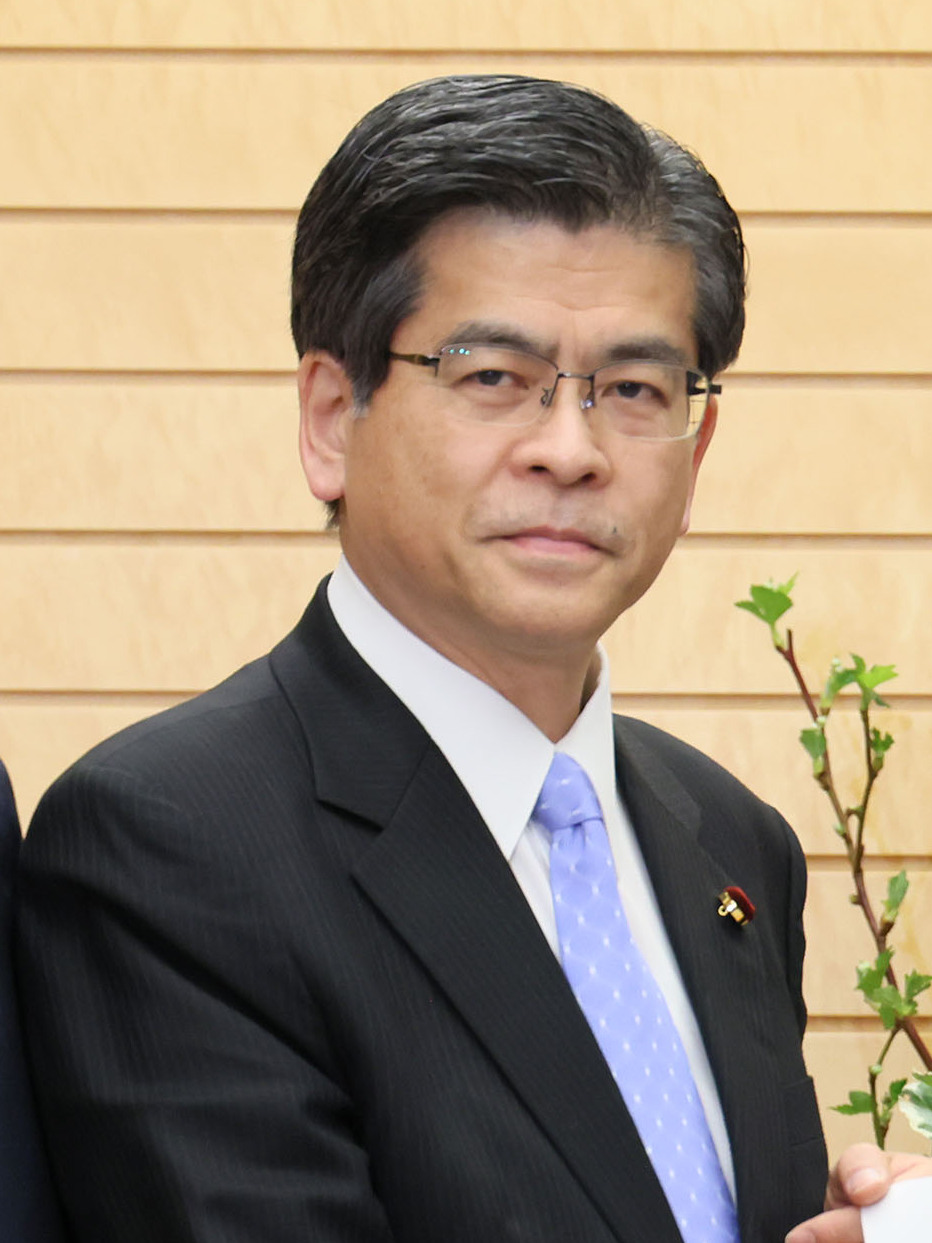

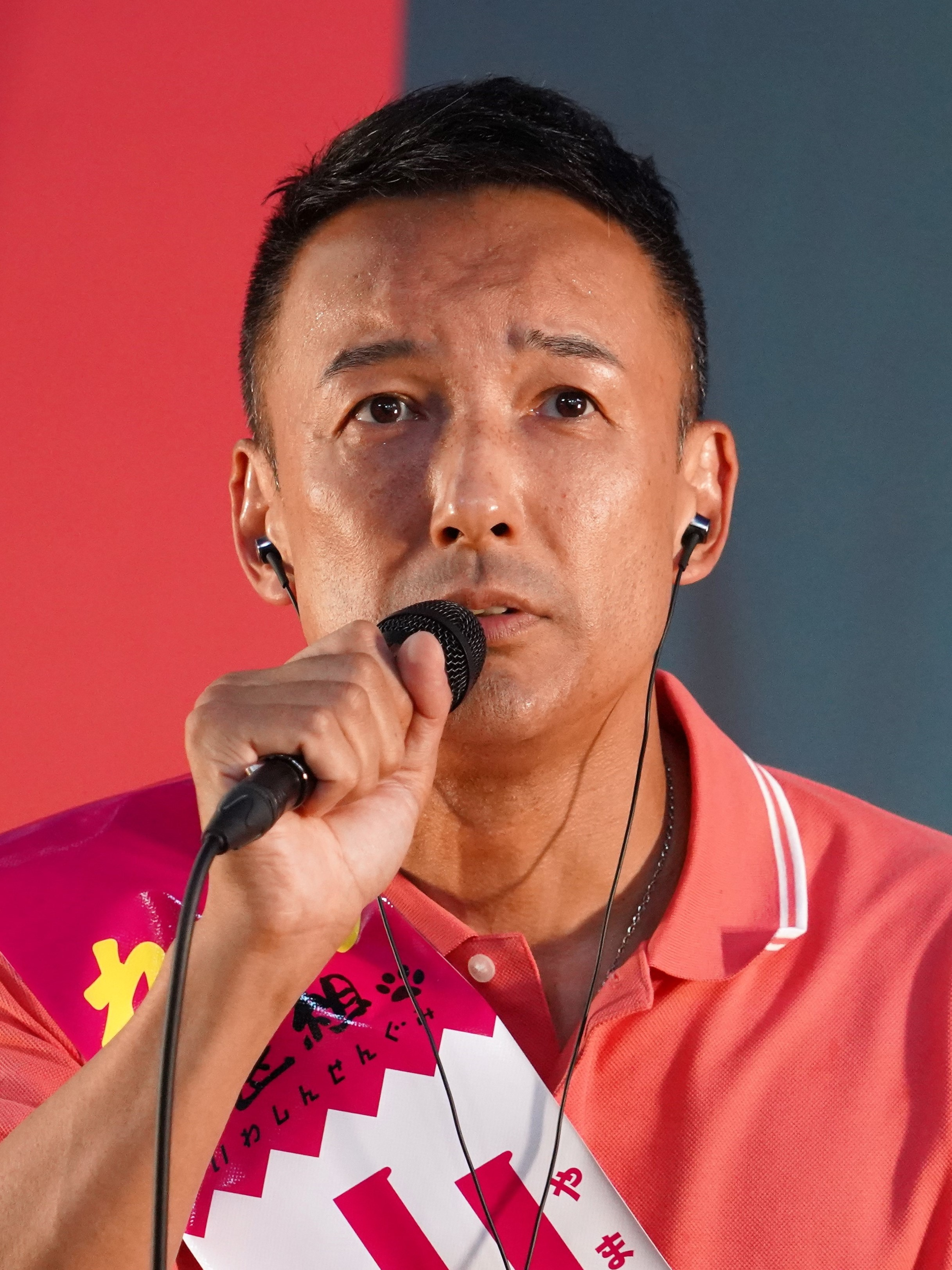

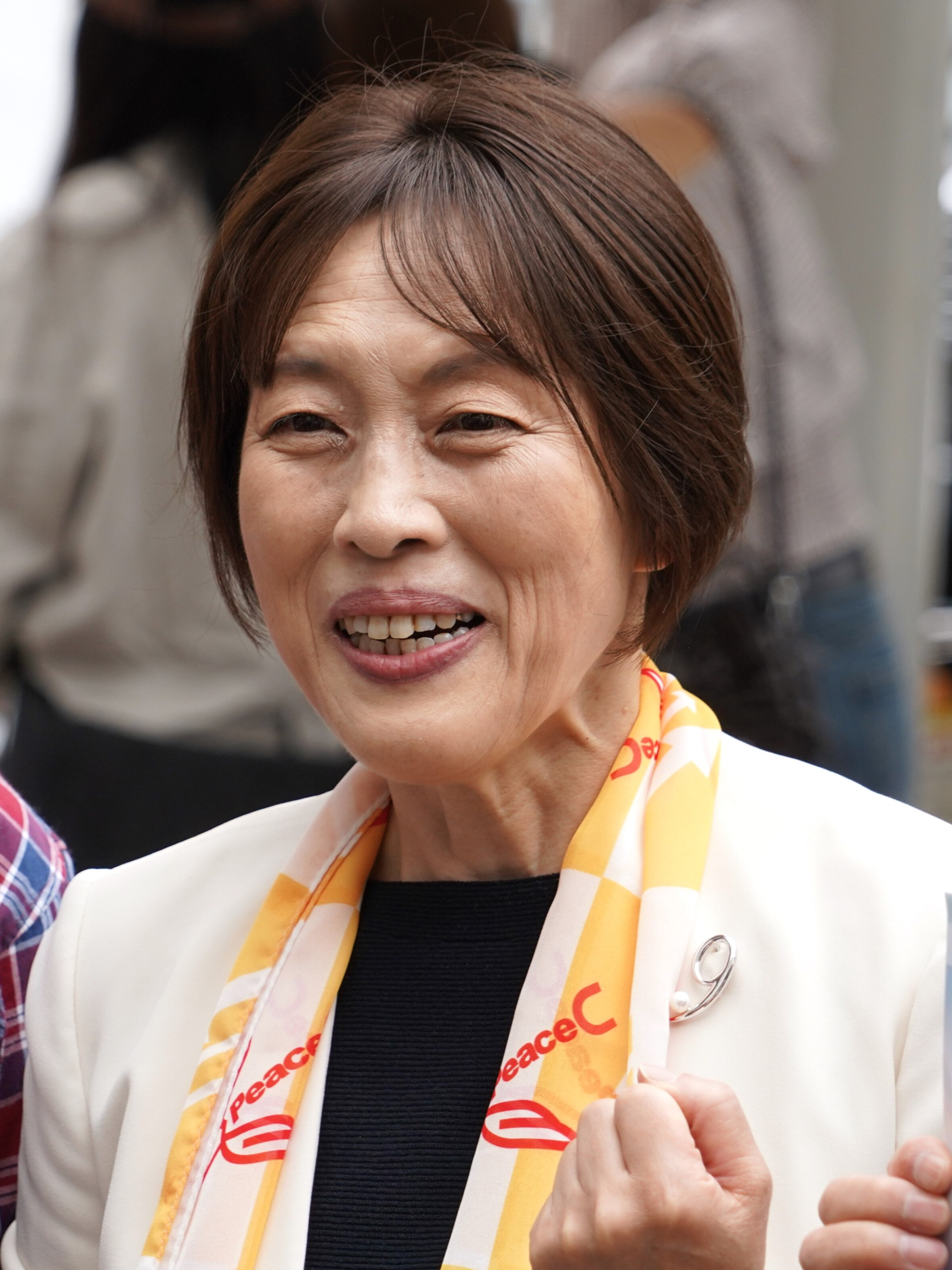

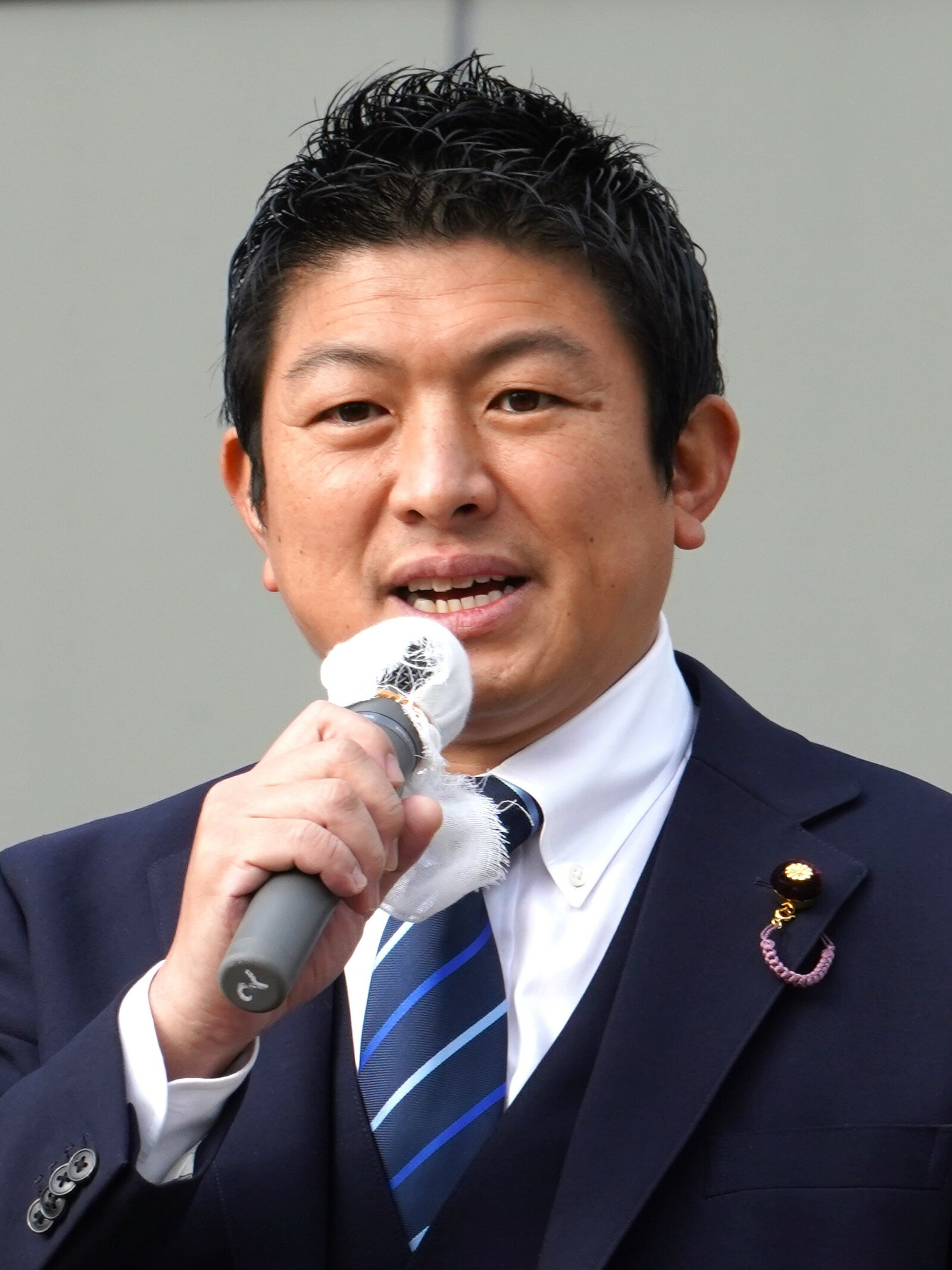

	First party	Second party	Third party
Leader	Shigeru Ishiba	Yoshihiko Noda	Nobuyuki Baba
Party	LDP	CDP	Ishin
Leader since	27 September 2024	23 September 2024	27 August 2022
Leader's seat	Tottori 1st	Chiba 14th	Osaka 17th
Last election	259 seats	96 seats	41 seats
Seats before	247	98	44
Seats won	191	148	38
Seat change	▼68	▲52	▼3
Constituency vote	20,867,762	15,740,860	6,048,103
% and swing	38.46% (▼9.62pp)	29.01% (▼0.95pp)	11.15% (▲2.79pp)
Regional vote	14,582,690	11,564,222	5,105,127
% and swing	26.73% (▼7.93pp)	21.20% (▲1.20pp)	9.36% (▼4.65pp)
	Fourth party	Fifth party	Sixth party
Leader	Yuichiro Tamaki	Keiichi Ishii	Tarō Yamamoto
Party	DPP	Komeito	Reiwa
Leader since	7 May 2018	28 September 2024	1 April 2019
Leader's seat	Kagawa 2nd	Northern Kanto PR (defeated) (Note: Ran in Saitama 14th)	Did not stand (Note: Sits in the House of Councillors for the Tokyo at-large district)
Last election	11 seats	32 seats	3 seats
Seats before	7	32	3
Seats won	28	24	9
Seat change	▲16	▼8	▲6
Constituency vote	2,349,584	730,401	425,445
% and swing	4.33% (▲2.16pp)	1.35% (▼0.17pp)	0.78% (▲0.35pp)
Regional vote	6,172,434	5,964,415	3,805,060
% and swing	11.32% (▲6.81pp)	10.93% (▼1.45pp)	6.98% (▲3.12pp)
	Seventh party	Eighth party	Ninth party
Leader	Tomoko Tamura	Sohei Kamiya	Naoki Hyakuta Takashi Kawamura
Party	JCP	Sanseitō	CPJ
Leader since	18 January 2024	17 March 2020	1 September 2023
Leader's seat	Tokyo PR	Did not stand (Note: Sits in the House of Councillors for the national PR block)	Did not stand
Last election	10 seats	Did not contest	Did not exist
Seats before	10	0	0
Seats won	8	3	3
Seat change	▼2	New	New
Constituency vote	3,695,807	1,357,189	155,837
% and swing	6.81% (▲2.22pp)	2.50% (New)	0.29% (New)
Regional vote	3,362,966	1,870,347	1,145,622
% and swing	6.16% (▼1.09pp)	3.43% (New)	2.10% (New)
- Districts and PR districts, shaded according to winners' vote strength
Prime Minister before election
Shigeru Ishiba
LDP
Elected Prime Minister
Shigeru Ishiba
LDP

General elections were held in Japan on 27 October 2024 due to the early dissolution of the House of Representatives, the lower house of the National Diet, by Prime Minister Shigeru Ishiba. Voting took place in all constituencies, including proportional blocks, to elect all 465 members of the House of Representatives.

The election was held one month after Ishiba took office as prime minister, after winning a heated contest in the Liberal Democratic Party (LDP) presidential election on 27 September, following the resignation of Fumio Kishida as party leader due to his low approval rating amid the party-wide slush fund corruption scandal. The dissolution of the Diet was held eight days after the prime minister's investiture and 26 days before the voting day, both the shortest since the end of World War II.

Amid continued public discontent with the slush fund scandal, the governing LDP and its coalition partner Komeito lost their parliamentary majority in the lower house for the first time since 2009, with the LDP suffering its second-worst result in its history, securing only 191 seats. The Constitutional Democratic Party (CDP), the main opposition party led by former Prime Minister Yoshihiko Noda, achieved its best result in its history, increasing its seat count from 96 to 148. This was the first general election in Japan since 1955 wherein no party secured at least 200 seats.

The Democratic Party for the People (DPP) won 28 seats, surpassing Komeito to become the fourth-largest party in the chamber. The DPP emerged as a key player in the aftermath of the election as the LDP sought to negotiate their cooperation on a policy-by-policy basis in the next Diet session given the LDP's lack of a majority. Komeito suffered further losses including losing all of its seats in Osaka at the expense of the Osaka-based Ishin no Kai as well as the party's newly elected leader Keiichi Ishii losing his seat. Smaller opposition parties also gained seats, including left-wing populist party Reiwa Shinsengumi, right-wing populist party Sanseitō and the newly-formed far-right Conservative Party.

Ishiba was re-elected Prime Minister in the Diet on 11 November as head of an LDP-Komeito minority government.

== Background ==
=== Kishida's resignation ===
Since the last general election in 2021, Prime Minister Fumio Kishida was caught in a series of political crises, firstly the assassination of Shinzo Abe in 2022, which led to the heightened scrutiny against the allegations surrounding the Unification Church and its link to his Liberal Democratic Party (LDP). The close relationship between the party and the church caused a drop in approval rating of the Kishida cabinet, and anti-government protests and riots, leading to the first reshuffle of his cabinet on 10 August 2022 and second reshuffle in September 2023 to remove cabinet members affiliated with the church.

The Kishida government was further damaged by the party-wide slush fund corruption scandal in late 2023, which saw his approval rate drop to 23% as of 13 December 2023, the lowest such rating any prime minister had had since the LDP returned to power in 2012. By 22 December, Kishida's approval rate had further declined to 17%. On 18 January 2024, Kishida announced his intention to dissolve his Kōchikai faction as a result of the scandal. The following day on 19 January, the Shisuikai (Nikai faction) and Seiwa Seisaku Kenkyūkai (Abe faction) announced their dissolutions.

Kishida never recovered from the record-low approval ratings amid fallout from the scandal. His party lost all three seats up for election in the April 2024 by-elections, which were previously held by LDP or LDP-affiliated independents. On 14 August 2024, Kishida announced that he would step down as party president, thereby not seeking re-election in September.

=== Ishiba's call for early election ===
On 30 September 2024, former Minister of Defense Shigeru Ishiba, who won the heated nine-way contest in the party presidential election on 27 September, officially announced that he would call an early election to be held on 27 October, a year ahead of the expiration of the current term, to seek confidence from the people. After his inauguration as the prime minister on 1 October, the House of Representatives was dissolved on 9 October, with the election being announced on the 15th, and voting to take place on the 27th.

The election is held after the replacement of major party leaders. The LDP elected Ishiba as new leader on 27 September, the Constitutional Democratic Party (CDP) elected former Prime Minister Yoshihiko Noda on 23 September, Nobuyuki Baba took leadership of Japan Innovation Party on 30 November 2021, Keiichi Ishii was elected leader of Komeito on 28 September, and Tomoko Tamura became leader of the Japanese Communist Party (JCP) on 18 January 2024. It is the first time since 2012 where all three of the leading parties in the Diet have had new leadership entering the next election.

The regular election to the House of Councillors, the other house of the national legislature which cannot be dissolved and is thus on fixed terms, will take place in 2025; but, also on 27 October, a by-election to the House of Councillors will be held in Iwate. On the prefectural level, the gubernatorial elections in Toyama and Okayama had already been set for 27 October. This was the first dissolution of the Diet since 14 October 2021. The dissolution was eight days after the prime minister's inauguration and the voting and counting 26 days later that, both the shortest since the end of World War II.

== Electoral system ==
The 465 seats of the House of Representatives are contested via parallel voting. Of these, 289 members are elected in single-member constituencies using first-past-the-post voting, while 176 members are elected in 11 multi-member constituencies via party list proportional representation. Candidates from parties with legal political party-list, which requires either ≥5 Diet members or ≥1 Diet member and ≥2% of the nationwide vote in one tier of a recent national election, are allowed to stand in a constituency and be present on the party list. If they lose their constituency vote, they may still be elected in the proportionally allocated seats. However, if such a dual candidate wins less than 10% of the vote in their majoritarian constituency, they are also disqualified as a proportional candidate.

=== Reapportionment ===
The electoral districts will be readjusted according to the results of the 2020 Japan census. Originally, it was intended to be readjusted for the last election, but it was held in the existing constituencies not long after the census results came out.

==== Newly created seats ====
Ten new districts and three new block seats will be created.

1. Tokyo-26th
2. Tokyo-27th
3. Tokyo-28th
4. Tokyo-29th
5. Tokyo-30th
6. Kanagawa-19th
7. Kanagawa-20th
8. Saitama-16th
9. Aichi-16th
10. Chiba-14th
11. 18th Tokyo block seat
12. 19th Tokyo block seat
13. 23rd Minami-Kanto block seat

==== Seats eliminated ====
Ten districts and three block seats will be eliminated.

1. Hiroshima-7th
2. Miyagi-6th
3. Niigata-6th
4. Fukushima-5th
5. Okayama-5th
6. Shiga-4th
7. Yamaguchi-4th
8. Ehime-4th
9. Nagasaki-4th
10. Wakayama-3rd
11. 13th Tohoku block seat
12. 11th Hokuriku-Shin'etsu block seat
13. 11th Chugoku block seat

== Political parties and candidates ==
Parties	Leader	Ideology	Seats		Status
Parties	Leader	Ideology	Last election	At dissolution	Status
Liberal Democratic Party	Shigeru Ishiba	Conservatism; Japanese nationalism	259 / 465	247 / 465	Governing coalition
Constitutional Democratic Party of Japan	Yoshihiko Noda	Liberalism	96 / 465	98 / 465	Opposition
Japan Innovation Party	Nobuyuki Baba	Right-wing populism Economic liberalism	41 / 465	44 / 465	Opposition
Komeito	Keiichi Ishii	Buddhist democracy	32 / 465	32 / 465	Governing coalition
Japanese Communist Party	Tomoko Tamura	Communism	10 / 465	10 / 465	Opposition
Democratic Party For the People	Yuichiro Tamaki	Conservatism	11 / 465	7 / 465	Opposition
Reiwa Shinsengumi	Tarō Yamamoto	Progressivism; Left-wing populism	3 / 465	3 / 465	Opposition
Social Democratic Party	Mizuho Fukushima	Social democracy	1 / 465	1 / 465	Opposition
Sanseitō	Sohei Kamiya	Right-wing populism Ultraconservatism	0 / 465	1 / 465	Opposition
Nonpartisan and others	—N/a	—N/a	12 / 465	22 / 465	Opposition

As of 15 October, there were 314 women competing in the election, which exceeded the number recorded in the 2009 election. The proportion of women in the electoral race also increased from 5.7% in 2021 to 23.4%. There were also 136 candidates who were related to previous officeholders, making up 10% of all candidates. The LDP accounted for 97 of them, equivalent to 28.4% of all its candidates, while the CDP had 27 candidates, equivalent to 11.4% of its list.

=== Governing coalition ===
Single-member districts candidates

On 6 October, Shigeru Ishiba indicated that he would not endorse any lawmakers who have been suspended from party membership over the LDP slush fund scandal. Ishiba also indicated that those who had involved scandal, whether they had been sanctioned or not, would be banned from running double candidacy in single-seat districts and proportional representation blocs, which was expected to affect at least 30 such candidates. He explained that it was a response to the "criticism and anger" of the public which were stronger than they expected.

On 9 October, the LDP officially pulled its endorsement of the following 12 members:

Party membership suspended:

- Hakubun Shimomura (Tokyo 11th district), former Minister of Education, Culture, Sports, Science and Technology
- Yasutoshi Nishimura (Hyogo 9th district), former Minister of Economy, Trade and Industry
- Tsuyoshi Takagi (Fukui 2nd district), former Chairman of the LDP Diet Affairs Committee

Suspended from party positions for one year which still in effect:

- Kōichi Hagiuda (Tokyo 24th district), former Chairman of the LDP Policy Research Council
- Katsuei Hirasawa (Tokyo 17th district), former Minister of Reconstruction
- Hiromi Mitsubayashi (Saitama 14th district), former Vice Minister of the Cabinet Office

Suspended from party positions for six months which now expired:

- Ichiro Kanke (Tohoku PR block), former Deputy Minister of Reconstruction (withdrew his candidacy on 12 October)
- Kazuyuki Nakane (Northern Kanto PR block), former Deputy Minister of Foreign Affairs
- Kiyoshi Odawara (Tokyo 21st district), former Deputy Minister of Foreign Affairs

Received disciplinary reprimand:

- Kenichi Hosoda (Niigata 2nd district), former Deputy Minister of Economy, Trade and Industry

No punishment received:

- Takao Ochi (Tokyo PR block), former Deputy Minister of Cabinet Office
- Hirofumi Imamura (Tokyo PR block), former member of the House of Representatives

On 11 October, three members who were involved in the scandal, all from the former Seiwa Seisaku Kenkyūkai faction, including former Parliamentary Vice-Minister for Internal Affairs and Communications Mio Sugita, who was suspended from party positions for six months, former Vice-Minister for Internal Affairs and Communications Asako Omi, who was given a reprimand, and former Parliamentary Secretary for Foreign Affairs Kentaro Uesugi, who did not receive any disciplinary action, would withdraw their candidacies in the election.

Keiichi Ishii, leader of the Komeito which was LDP's junior coalition partner, said on 8 October that the party would not recommend LDP lawmakers who were not officially endorsed in the election, but decided to recommend Nishimura and Mitsubayashi on 9 October despite LDP decision based on the wishes of the party's local organizations.

=== Opposition parties ===
Number of registered candidates by party
Party	Before election	Const.	PR	Running in both	Total
LDP	247	266	76	209	342
CDP	98	207	30	204	237
Ishin	44	163	1	145	164
Komei	32	11	39	0	50
JCP	10	213	23	12	236
DPP	7	41	1	41	42
Reiwa	3	19	16	16	35
SDP	1	10	7	10	17
Sansei	1	85	10	12	95
Mintsuku	0	6	0	1	6
Hoshu	0	4	26	0	30
CES	0	0	2	0	2
Ind./Oth.	22	88	–	–	88
Total	465	1,113	231	650	1,344

After holding talks with the right-leaning Nippon Ishin no Kai leader Nobuyuki Baba and Democratic Party for the People (DPP) leader Yuichiro Tamaki on 3 October in an attempt to unifying opposition candidates for constituencies to prevent the LDP and its Komeito ally from securing a majority, CDP leader Yoshihiko Noda on 4 October switched his stance to aiming to form a government on its own by filling more candidates in the proportional representation blocks.

The CDP and the left-wing pacifist JCP also had differences over their stances on the security-related laws, as Noda aimed at winning over "moderate conservatives" critical of the LDP government, by formulating more middle-of-the-road foreign policy and security measures including the continuation of the laws, while the JCP, which was fielding as many as 216 candidates in the single-seat constituencies, advocated for the repeal of the laws under the banner of the opposition coalition during the 2016 House of Councillors election.

The Nikkei on 11 October reported that the opposition could only manage to have 55 constituencies where they would be a one-on-one battle with the LDP, under 20% of the 289 single-seat constituencies as compared to the 140 constituencies in the previous election in 2021. There would be 81 constituencies where CDP, Ishin and other parties compete, and 67 where CDP competes with opposition parties other than Ishin.

On 3 October, Seiji Maehara, leader of the Free Education For All which commanded four seats in the Diet, announced that his party would join the Nippon Ishin no Kai after months of talks for merger and would run as Ishin-endorsed candidates in the upcoming election. However, House of Representatives member Atsushi Suzuki, who would run in the Kanagawa 18th district, did not join the party, due to its competition with a Ishin candidate in the same constituency. On the same day he announced that he would run as an official candidate for the Sanseitō party. Suzuki later decided that he would run in the Southern Kanto proportional representation block with the Sanseitō's endorsement.

== Campaign ==
A week before the election, a Kyodo News survey on 20 October showed that the support for the CDP and other opposition parties was growing steadily against that of the ruling LDP, with 22.6% of the respondents planned to vote for the LDP in the proportional representation block, 14.1% for the CDP, narrowing the gap between the two main parties to 8.5 percentage points from 14.0 points in the last survey. 9.7% of respondents wanted to see the ruling and opposition parties to be evenly split, while 20.5% said they wanted to see the LDP out of power, up 5.4 points from the previous survey.

Another poll on 21 October by the Kyodo News suggested the LDP-Komeito coalition might lose its majority, the first time since the 2009 general election, while the CDP could win more than 100 seats in the single-seat districts, up sharply from 60 before the election, and more seats under proportional representation. The Nippon Ishin no Kai was projected to lose some of its 43 seats, while the DPP could increase its seats from seven before the race due to greater support in the proportional representation block, with the JCP building on the nine seats it held.

On 20 October, LDP Secretary-General Hiroshi Moriyama floated the idea of expanding the coalition framework by "holding discussions with political parties that have the same policies and are committed to developing the country". Although he said that he did not have a specific party in mind, there were "whispers" within the party that the conservative-leaning Ishin and DPP could be new coalition partners. Ishin Secretary-General Fujita Fumitake on 23 October said it was impossible for the time being for his party to form a coalition with the LDP and Komeito if the ruling coalition lost its majority. He also declined to form a coalition with the CDP given that the LDP and Komeito Party did not have a majority, citing differences in their security, energy, and economic policies.

As the possibility of LDP losing power became likely, Prime Minister Shigeru Ishiba began to question the CDP's ability to govern, reminding voters the "nightmare Democratic Party administration", CDP's predecessor which ruled from 2009 to 2012, while CDP leader Yoshihiko Noda, who was also then the Democratic prime minister, stepped up his criticism of the LDP slush fund scandal and called for a change of government. Going into the last week of the campaign, each party began to narrow down the electoral districts which were fiercely contested, with their party leaders and executives rallying their support in those districts. The LDP designated about 40 single-seat constituencies with close races as key constituencies. Ishin aimed to retain their stronghold of Osaka, where it faced off against Komeito, while also hoping to expand its support outside of Kansai. The JCP and SDP hoped to maintain its Okinawa electoral district seats and expanded their proportional representation votes.

On 23 October, the JCP's daily newspaper Shimbun Akahata accused the LDP of providing funds to the party's local branches headed by scandal-hit candidates which were not endorsed by the party, with 20 million yen ($130,000) to each chapter. Ishiba insisted that the funds were not provided to candidates but to the branches as "activity expenses", with the party dismissing the report as having "distorted the facts and caused a misunderstanding". CDP leader Noda criticised the LDP for "deceiving voters" and that it "should never be done". Koichi Hagiuda, whose branch received the "activity expenses", announced on 25 October that he had repaid the 20 million yen.

== Election violence ==
On the morning of 19 October, Atsunobu Usuda, a 49-year-old man from Kawaguchi in Saitama Prefecture, threw firebombs at the LDP headquarters and crashed a van into a barrier at the nearby Prime Minister's Office in Tokyo. No injury was reported but a police vehicle was partially burned after Usuda threw around five objects at the LDP headquarters. According to his father, Usuda had previously been active in anti-nuclear protests and had also expressed dissatisfaction with Japan's electoral system, where candidates are required to deposit hefty sums of money to stand.

Speaking during a campaign in Satsumasendai, Kagoshima Prefecture on the same day, Prime Minister Ishiba said that "democracy must never succumb to violence" and pledged to do "everything possible to ensure that this election is not ruined by violence".

== Debates ==
The LDP slush fund scandal became a major issue during the debate hosted by the Japan National Press Club on 12 October. CDP leader Yoshihiko Noda criticised Prime Minister Shigeru Ishiba's dissolution of the Diet as a "cover-up" of the scandal and that "a change of government is the greatest political reform". Ishiba said that he would consider abolishing the policy activity expenses in the future but maintained that "it is legal under the current system" and the party would not use it "restrainedly" when questioned by DPP leader, Yuichiro Tamaki. Ishin leader Nobuyuki Baba also criticised Komeito's decision to recommend two former LDP lawmakers which were not endorsed by the LDP due to the scandal. Komeito leader, Ishii Keiichi explained that the decision was based on criteria such as "the understanding of local [Komeito] party members and supporters".

Several opposition parties called for the reduction or abolition of the consumption tax, with the CDP suggesting a "tax credit with benefits" that would essentially refund part of the consumption tax by combining tax credits and benefits for low- and middle-income earners. Ishiba argued that the country needed a stable source of funding for social security going forward and would not consider lowering the tax.

Noda suggested that Japan should participate as an observer in the Conference of the Parties to the Treaty on the Prohibition of Nuclear Weapons in order to achieve nuclear abolition, while Ishiba stressed the functionality of nuclear deterrence. Noda also said he would abolish the unconstitutional parts of the security-related laws if the CDP gained power. Baba questioned Ishiba's determination and feasibility in reviewing the U.S.–Japan Status of Forces Agreement, a pledge made during the recent LDP leadership race.

2024 Japanese general election debates
Date	Host	Format	Venue	P Present; I Invited; S Surrogate; NI Not invited; A Absent; N No debate								
Date	Host	Format	Venue	LDP	CDP	Ishin	Komei	JCP	DPP	Reiwa	SDP	Sansei
12 October	Japan National Press Club	Debate	Japan National Press Club, Tokyo	P Ishiba	P Noda	P Baba	P Ishii	P Tamura	P Tamaki	P Yamamoto	NI	NI
13 October	NHK (Nichiyō Tōron)	Debate	NHK Broadcasting Center, Tokyo	P Ishiba	P Noda	P Baba	P Ishii	P Tamura	P Tamaki	P Yamamoto	P Fukushima	P Kamiya
20 October	NHK (Nichiyō Tōron)	Debate	NHK Broadcasting Center, Tokyo	S Moriyama	S Ogawa	S Fujita	S Nishida	S Koike	S Shimba	S Takai	S Otsubaki	P Kamiya

== Opinion polling ==
LOESS curve of the voter intention polling for the next Japanese general election with a seven-day average.

=== Seat projections ===
Color key: Exit poll

Seat projections from analysts (district seats + proportional representation)
Analysts	Publication/ Newspapers	Fieldwork date	LDP	CDP	Ishin	Komei	JCP	DPFP	Reiwa	DIY	SDP	CPJ	Ind./ Oth.	LDP Majority	Gov.	Opp.	Gov. Majority
Election results		27 Oct 2024	191 (132+59)	148 (104+44)	38 (23+15)	24 (4+20)	8 (1+7)	28 (11+17)	9 (0+9)	3 (0+3)	1 (1+0)	3 (1+2)	12 (12+0)	–42	215	250	–18
NHK		27 Oct 2024	153–219	128–191	28–45	21–35	7–10	20–33	6–14	0–4	1	1–4	9–17	–	174–254	200–319	–
JNN		27 Oct 2024	181	159	35	27	10	27	7	3	1	–	15	–52	208	257	–25
Kaoru Matsuda	Zakzak	24 Oct 2024	203 (144+59)	144 (99+45)	38 (19+19)	25 (6+19)	11 (1+10)	19 (6+13)	6 (0+6)	3 (0+3)	1 (1+0)	3 (1+2)	12 (12+0)	–30	228	237	–5
Masashi Kubota	Shūkan Bunshun	23 Oct 2024	197 (136+61)	153 (109+44)	42 (20+22)	25 (6+19)	12 (1+11)	11 (4+7)	6 (0+6)	2 (0+2)	1 (1+0)	5 (1+4)	11 (11+0)	–36	222	243	–11
Mainichi		22–23 Oct 2024	171–225	126–177	29–40	23–29	7–9	23–29	6–7	0–1	1	–	11–23 (Note: Others: 1–6; Independents: 10–17)	–	194–254	203–287	–
JNN		22–23 Oct 2024	~195	~138	<43	<32	<10	>11	–	–	1–2	>5	–	–	<227	~232	–
Sankei/FNN		19–20 Oct 2024	~196	~148	<43	~22	>10	~22	>3	–	–	–	–	–	~218	~247	–17
Asahi		19–20 Oct 2024	200 (Note: LDP-Independents: 5 (5+0)) (144+56)	138 (97+41)	38 (19+19)	25 (5+20)	12 (1+11)	21 (7+14)	11 (0+11)	2 (0+2)	1 (1+0)	–	17 (Note: Others: 3 (1+2); Independents: 14 (14+0)) (15+2)	–33	225	240	–8
Hiroshi Miura	BS11	18 Oct 2024	235 (170+65)	118 (77+41)	38 (13+25)	29 (8+21)	9 (0+9)	12 (5+7)	5 (0+5)	1 (0+1)	2 (1+1)	2 (1+1)	14 (14+0)	2	264	201	31
Masashi Kubota	Shūkan Bunshun	18 Oct 2024	204 (135+69)	145 (106+39)	45 (23+22)	28 (6+22)	11 (1+10)	11 (4+7)	6 (0+6)	1 (0+1)	1 (1+0)	–	13 (Note: Independents: 13 (13+0)) (13+0)	–29	232	233	–1
Yomiuri/NNN	Nikkei	15–16 Oct 2024	231 (Note: LDP-Independents: 5 (5+0)) (167+64)	130 (85+45)	32 (17+15)	30 (7+23)	12 (1+11)	12 (5+7)	6 (0+6)	1 (0+1)	2 (1+1)	4 (1+3)	5 (5+0)	–2	261	204	28
Mainichi/JNN		15–16 Oct 2024	203–250	117–163	28–34	24–29	5–6	13–20	6	0	1	–	12–14	–	227–279	182–244	–
Tadaoki Nogami	Nikkan Gendai	15 Oct 2024	202 (Note: LDP-Independents: 4 (4+0)) (148+54)	150 (99+51)	49 (21+28)	28 (8+20)	10 (1+9)	11 (4+7)	4 (0+4)	1 (0+1)	2 (1+1)	1 (0+1)	7 (7+0)	–31	230	235	–3
Hiroshi Miura	BS Prime News	15 Oct 2024	228–258	98–117	44–46	24–32	10	–	–	–	–	–	–	–	257	208	24
Masahiko Hisae	BS Prime News	15 Oct 2024	230	130	45	28	10	–	–	–	–	–	–	–3	258	207	25
Hiroshi Miura	Sports Hochi	14 Oct 2024	229	116	47	29	10	12	5	0	2	1	14	–4	258	207	25
Tadaoki Nogami	AERA (only district seats)	13 Oct 2024	153	91	23	6	0	5	0	0	1	1	9	–	159	130	–
Koichi Kakutani	AERA (only district seats)	13 Oct 2024	152	85	23	8	1	4	0	0	1	1	14	–	160	129	–
Kaoru Matsuda	Zakzak	9 Oct 2024	226 (165+61)	122 (79+43)	45 (19+26)	29 (8+21)	11 (1+10)	11 (4+7)	5 (0+5)	2 (0+2)	1 (1+0)	2 (1+1)	11 (11+0)	–7	255	210	22
Hiroshi Miura	Sunday Mainichi	8 Oct 2024	234 (166+68)	112 (74+38)	43 (17+26)	30 (9+21)	10 (1+9)	12 (5+7)	5 (0+5)	0 (0+0)	2 (1+1)	1 (1+0)	16 (Note: Free Education For All: 2 (1+1); Independents: 14 (14+0)) (15+1)	1	264	201	31
Tadaoki Nogami	Nikkan Gendai	6 Oct 2024	202 (147+55)	148 (97+51)	54 (26+28)	25 (5+20)	10 (1+9)	12 (5+7)	4 (0+4)	0 (0+0)	2 (1+1)	1 (0+1)	7 (7+0)	–31	227	238	–6
Masashi Kubota	Shūkan Bunshun	3 Oct 2024	219 (147+72)	131 (94+37)	50 (24+26)	25 (6+19)	10 (1+9)	11 (4+7)	6 (0+6)	0 (0+0)	1 (1+0)	–	12 (Note: Free Education For All: 1 (1+0); Independents: 11 (11+0)) (12+0)	–14	244	221	11
Kaoru Matsuda	Zakzak	27 May 2024	205 (149+56)	151 (102+49)	45 (20+25)	25 (5+20)	10 (1+9)	10 (5+5)	6 (0+6)	4 (0+4)	1 (1+0)	2 (0+2)	6 (Note: Free Education For All: 1 (1+0); Independents: 5 (5+0)) (6+0)	–28	230	235	–3
Tadaoki Nogami	Nikkan Gendai	5 May 2024	184 (133+51)	161 (114+47)	58 (25+33)	23 (3+20)	11 (1+10)	10 (5+5)	6 (0+6)	1 (0+1)	2 (1+1)	–	9 (Note: Free Education For All: 3 (1+2); Independents: 6 (6+0)) (7+2)	–49	207	258	–26
2021 general election		31 Oct 2021	259 (187+72)	96 (57+39)	41 (16+25)	32 (9+23)	10 (1+9)	11 (6+5)	3 (0+3)	–	1 (1+0)	–	12 (12+0)	26	291	174	58

== Results ==
Proportional bloc vote strength

Voter turnout was 53.84%, around two percentage points down from 2021 and the third lowest in the postwar era, while the number of female candidates reached the record high of 73, equivalent to 16% of the House of Representatives' composition.

The ruling LDP-Komeito coalition lost their majority for the first time since 2009. Although the LDP still remained the largest party, the coalition fell short of the 233 seats needed for a majority, securing only 215. Prime Minister Shigeru Ishiba said he accepted the "harsh judgement" of the voters "humbly and solemnly" and pledged to become a political party that was "more in line with the will of the people".

74% of voters in a Kyodo News exit poll considered the slush fund scandal when casting their ballots, with 68% of the LDP supporters also thought so. Komeito leader Keiichi Ishii also pointed out that the payment of 20 million yen to party branches headed by the scandal-hit candidates "had a significant impact on the election campaign". At least two LDP cabinet members lost in the election, Minister of Justice Hideki Makihara and Minister of Agriculture, Forestry and Fisheries Yasuhiro Ozato, who lost in the Saitama 5th district, to former CDP leader Yukio Edano, and Kagoshima 3rd district respectively.

Seven out of nine former Abe faction members, including former Minister of Education Hakubun Shimomura, who were involved in the slush fund scandal and ran as independents, lost in the election, except for Yasutoshi Nishimura and Koichi Hagiuda. Excluding these two men, the former Abe faction (Seiwa Seisaku Kenkyūkai) had 20 winners, compared to the 59 members in last year. The Aso faction (Shikōkai), chaired by top advisor Taro Aso, became the largest faction within the party with 31 members. In the former Ishiba faction (Suigetsukai), centered around Prime Minister Ishiba, members such as Deputy Minister of Justice Hiroaki Kadoyama and Deputy Minister of the Environment Tetsuya Yagi were defeated.

Komeito leader Keiichi Ishii — who took the post only a month prior to the election — lost his Saitama 14th district seat, becoming the first head of the coalition partner to suffer a defeat since former Komeito leader Akihiro Ota's loss in 2009. Komeito were also defeated by Ishin candidates in all electoral districts in Osaka, including the 3rd district, where Deputy Leader Sato Shigeki lost his seat.

The CDP became the biggest winner in the election, gaining 52 seats and jumping from 96 seats in the previous election to 148 seats, with leader Yoshihiko Noda aiming to form a government replacing the LDP with other opposition parties. The DPP quadrupled its seats from seven to 28 but lost one proportional representation seat in the Northern Kanto block and two in the Tokai block because several candidates on the list were elected in the single-seat constituencies.

Nippon Ishin no Kai, also known as the Japan Restoration Party, faced fierce challenges outside its Kansai stronghold which saw its losing about three million votes from the previous election nationally but was able to win all 19 single-seat constituencies in Osaka, ensuring the party's monopoly in the prefecture. Reiwa Shinsengumi and its party leader Taro Yamamoto tripled their seats, gaining six from the three they held previously. Yamamoto stated that he wished to gain more in the future. Reiwa also managed to pass the JCP for the first time, which fell to eight seats for the first time since 2009 and failed to make gains on the proportional blocks across the country. JCP leader Tomoko Tamura commented by saying that "despite losses, we were able to bring the 20 million yen to everyone's attention by running candidates in every district."

Despite falling short of its goal of winning five seats, the newly established Conservative Party of Japan gained three seats and entered the Diet for the first time, with former Nagoya mayor Takashi Kawamura being declared the winner in the Aichi 1st district and two other candidates won the Tokai proportional representation block and Kinki proportional representation block. By receiving more than 2% of the votes in the proportional representation blocks, the party was officially recognised as a political party by law and would be given political party subsidies and would be able to fill duplicate candidates to run in both single-seat constituency and proportional representation blocks and appear in political broadcasts.

Party	Proportional			Constituency			Total seats	+/–
Party	Votes	%	Seats	Votes	%	Seats	Total seats	+/–
Liberal Democratic Party	14,582,690	26.73	59	20,867,762	38.46	132	191	−68
Constitutional Democratic Party of Japan	11,564,222	21.20	44	15,740,860	29.01	104	148	+52
Japan Innovation Party	5,105,127	9.36	15	6,048,104	11.15	23	38	−3
Democratic Party For the People	6,172,434	11.32	17	2,349,584	4.33	11	28	+17
Komeito	5,964,415	10.93	20	730,401	1.35	4	24	−8
Reiwa Shinsengumi	3,805,060	6.98	9	425,445	0.78	0	9	+6
Japanese Communist Party	3,362,966	6.16	7	3,695,807	6.81	1	8	−2
Sanseitō	1,870,347	3.43	3	1,357,189	2.50	0	3	New
Conservative Party of Japan	1,145,622	2.10	2	155,837	0.29	1	3	New
Social Democratic Party	934,598	1.71	0	283,287	0.52	1	1	0
Collaborative Party	23,784	0.04	0	29,275	0.05	0	0	0
Consideration the Euthanasia System	18,455	0.03	0			0	0	0
Conservative Party of Nippon				21,671	0.04	0	0	New
Kawaguchi Vigilante Group				9,348	0.02	0	0	New
Third Way Party				6,033	0.01	0	0	New
Party that Ends the Liberal Democratic Party				4,424	0.01	0	0	New
Party of the Heart				1,749	0.00	0	0	New
Money for Everyone				530	0.00	0	0	New
Independents				2,534,571	4.67	12	12	0
Total	54,549,720	100.00	176	54,261,877	100.00	289	465	0
Valid votes	54,549,720	97.53		54,261,877	97.01			
Invalid/blank votes	1,379,079	2.47		1,672,577	2.99			
Total votes	55,928,799	100.00		55,934,454	100.00			
Registered voters/turnout	103,880,749	53.84		103,880,749	53.84			

=== By prefecture ===
Cartogram of single-member constituencies and proportional blocs

Prefecture	Total seats	Seats won								
Prefecture	Total seats	LDP	CDP	Ishin	DPP	Komei	JCP	CPJ	SDP	Ind.
Aichi	16	3	8		4			1		
Akita	3	1	1		1					
Aomori	3	2	1							
Chiba	14	7	7							
Ehime	3	2	1							
Fukui	2	1	1							
Fukuoka	11	7	2	1						1
Fukushima	4	1	3							
Gifu	5	4	1							
Gunma	5	5								
Hiroshima	6	3	1	1		1				
Hokkaido	12	3	9							
Hyōgo	12	7	2			2				1
Ibaraki	7	3	1		1					2
Ishikawa	3	2	1							
Iwate	3	1	2							
Kagawa	3	1	1		1					
Kagoshima	4	1	2							1
Kanagawa	20	9	11							
Kōchi	2	2								
Kumamoto	4	4								
Kyoto	6	2	2	1						1
Mie	4	2	2							
Miyagi	5	1	4							
Miyazaki	3	2	1							
Nagano	5	2	3							
Nagasaki	3	2			1					
Nara	3	2	1							
Niigata	5		5							
Ōita	3	1								2
Okayama	4	3	1							
Okinawa	4	2					1		1	
Osaka	19			19						
Saga	2		2							
Saitama	16	8	6		2					
Shiga	3	2		1						
Shimane	2	1	1							
Shizuoka	8	4	3		1					
Tochigi	5	3	2							
Tokushima	2	2								
Tokyo	30	11	15			1				3
Tottori	2	2								
Toyama	3	3								
Wakayama	2	1								1
Yamagata	3	3								
Yamaguchi	3	3								
Yamanashi	2	1	1							
Total	289	132	104	23	11	4	1	1	1	12

=== By PR block ===
PR block	Total seats	Seats won																	
PR block	Total seats	LDP	%	CDP	%	Komei	%	DPP	%	Ishin	%	Reiwa	%	JCP	%	Sansei	%	CPJ	%
Chūgoku	10	5	35.9%	3	19.5%	1	12.0%	1	10.5%	0	6.4%	0	5.9%	0	5.1%	0	3.0%	–	–
Hokkaido	8	3	26.8%	3	29.0%	1	10.6%	1	8.0%	0	4.0%	0	7.4%	0	7.1%	0	2.4%	0	2.6%
Hokuriku–Shinetsu	10	4	32.4%	3	25.0%	1	8.0%	1	10.4%	1	7.0%	0	6.7%	0	5.6%	0	3.1%	–	–
Kinki (Kansai)	28	6	20.8%	4	14.0%	3	11.6%	2	8.3%	7	23.3%	2	6.3%	2	7.3%	1	4.0%	1	3.3%
Kyushu	20	7	28.6%	4	20.3%	3	14.6%	2	9.5%	1	6.5%	1	7.8%	1	4.7%	1	4.7%	–	–
Northern Kanto	19	7	27.5%	5	22.0%	3	11.6%	1	11.8%	1	6.7%	1	7.2%	1	6.1%	0	3.0%	0	2.5%
Shikoku	6	3	31.0%	1	18.1%	1	12.7%	1	15.1%	0	6.7%	0	6.2%	0	5.7%	0	2.9%	–	–
Southern Kanto	23	7	25.4%	6	23.7%	2	10.2%	3	12.6%	2	7.5%	1	6.6%	1	6.1%	1	3.7%	0	2.7%
Tohoku	12	5	31.4%	4	26.3%	1	9.7%	1	10.5%	0	4.4%	1	7.2%	0	5.9%	0	2.5%	–	–
Tōkai	21	7	26.4%	6	22.6%	2	10.2%	1	13.2%	1	6.6%	2	7.8%	1	5.1%	0	2.8%	1	3.9%
Tokyo	19	5	23.6%	5	20.6%	2	9.0%	3	14.9%	2	8.1%	1	7.1%	1	7.9%	0	3.8%	0	3.2%
Total	176	59	26.7%	44	21.2%	20	10.9%	17	11.3%	15	9.4%	9	7.0%	7	6.2%	3	3.4%	2	2.1%

=== Party-list vote by prefecture ===
Prefecture	LDP	CDP	DPP	Komei	Ishin	Reiwa	JCP	Sansei	CPJ	SDP
Aichi	24.2	21.4	15.4	9.4	7.1	7.7	5.5	2.8	5.1	1.3
Akita	36.6	21.8	13.9	9.8	4.4	5.4	4.5	1.7	ー	1.8
Aomori	34.0	24.8	10.4	9.0	3.7	7.2	6.6	2.5	ー	1.7
Chiba	25.5	25.3	12.6	10.3	6.6	6.5	5.7	3.6	2.6	1.4
Ehime	31.8	21.2	12.8	12.7	6.4	6.6	4.2	2.8	ー	1.4
Fukui	33.4	22.2	9.9	8.1	8.6	6.9	4.0	5.3	ー	1.7
Fukuoka	25.3	19.7	11.2	15.1	7.9	8.2	5.2	5.0	ー	2.5
Fukushima	31.5	28.8	8.6	9.7	3.4	6.8	6.9	2.2	ー	2.1
Gifu	30.1	21.3	11.0	10.0	6.3	8.8	5.1	2.7	3.1	1.5
Gunma	30.5	21.1	8.8	12.2	5.6	7.5	6.4	3.2	2.8	2.0
Hiroshima	31.9	19.4	12.1	11.9	8.1	6.2	5.0	3.3	ー	2.3
Hokkaido	26.8	29.0	8.0	10.6	4.0	7.4	7.1	2.4	2.6	1.3
Hyogo	22.5	17.4	8.4	11.9	18.9	6.2	6.0	4.1	3.3	1.3
Ibaraki	32.2	19.1	12.1	11.8	6.5	7.1	5.1	2.5	2.2	1.3
Ishikawa	35.5	22.4	11.3	7.5	7.8	6.7	3.9	3.6	ー	1.2
Iwate	27.2	32.6	8.4	8.0	4.1	7.4	6.3	3.4	ー	2.6
Kagawa	30.2	14.7	25.8	10.3	5.2	5.0	4.0	2.9	ー	1.8
Kagoshima	35.1	21.5	7.2	12.5	5.6	7.3	3.4	4.2	ー	3.0
Kanagawa	24.9	22.6	13.0	10.0	8.4	6.6	6.4	3.8	2.7	1.7
Kochi	32.5	18.0	8.4	14.4	4.4	6.5	11.1	2.8	ー	1.8
Kumamoto	33.6	19.5	7.5	14.1	5.8	7.1	3.4	5.6	ー	3.3
Kyoto	21.3	18.0	9.6	9.1	15.7	6.3	11.9	4.0	3.1	1.0
Mie	26.0	26.6	9.9	12.1	6.5	7.6	4.6	2.5	2.9	1.2
Miyagi	28.5	25.9	10.7	10.7	6.3	7.6	5.8	2.8	ー	1.7
Miyazaki	32.2	19.6	10.5	14.6	5.6	7.0	3.8	3.8	ー	2.9
Nagano	25.0	28.4	9.6	9.5	7.1	7.3	8.3	2.8	ー	2.1
Nagasaki	30.1	19.5	11.9	15.4	7.4	5.5	3.6	4.3	ー	2.4
Nara	25.1	17.3	8.4	10.1	19.0	5.6	6.2	3.6	3.5	1.1
Niigata	34.0	27.7	10.1	7.0	5.7	6.0	5.0	2.4	ー	2.1
Oita	28.6	23.4	8.2	14.1	4.5	7.2	4.5	4.4	ー	5.1
Okayama	33.2	21.0	10.3	12.6	6.8	6.1	5.7	3.1	ー	1.1
Okinawa	19.4	17.4	6.9	16.9	5.9	12.1	8.2	5.0	ー	8.1
Osaka	16.8	10.0	8.0	12.7	30.7	6.4	7.1	4.0	3.4	1.0
Saga	32.0	26.1	10.1	11.8	4.1	6.6	3.3	3.8	ー	2.2
Saitama	24.3	22.9	12.9	11.4	7.2	7.1	6.9	3.2	2.7	1.5
Shiga	26.3	16.5	9.6	7.4	18.2	6.9	7.3	3.8	2.8	1.2
Shimane	41.8	22.1	7.7	10.3	3.6	5.2	5.1	2.3	ー	2.0
Shizuoka	28.9	23.8	11.5	11.1	5.7	7.4	4.7	2.9	2.5	1.6
Tochigi	30.2	24.1	9.9	11.6	6.2	7.4	4.1	2.8	2.2	1.4
Tokushima	31.0	18.2	15.1	12.7	6.7	6.2	5.7	2.9	ー	1.6
Tokyo	23.6	20.5	14.9	9.0	8.1	7.9	7.1	3.7	3.2	1.5
Tottori	48.4	16.1	6.5	13.0	3.1	5.0	4.2	2.4	ー	1.2
Toyama	39.4	17.6	12.7	7.1	7.6	6.3	4.3	2.9	ー	1.9
Wakayama	29.0	13.1	5.9	15.0	16.6	6.0	7.0	3.7	2.6	1.0
Yamagata	34.0	21.9	12.2	10.3	3.3	8.4	4.8	2.1	ー	2.9
Yamaguchi	38.2	17.6	10.9	12.1	5.5	5.9	4.8	3.0	ー	2.0
Yamanashi	30.8	24.4	8.8	11.1	4.1	7.3	5.9	3.8	2.5	1.4
Japan	26.7	21.2	11.3	10.9	9.4	7.0	6.2	3.4	2.1	1.7

== Aftermath ==
After the election, Prime Minister Shigeru Ishiba expressed his desire to continue in his position, saying at a press conference that he would "fulfill his responsibilities by tackling the current severe challenges". At a press conference on 28 October, Ishiba also said that it was "essential that people realize that the LDP has visibly changed" and announced the abolition of policy activity expenses. LDP's election campaign committee chairman Shinjiro Koizumi resigned from his position on 28 October to take responsibility for the party's disastrous performance. Hideki Makihara, the incumbent Minister of Justice who lost in Saitama 5th district and failed to be reinstated through proportional representation, indicated his intention to step down as minister.

Despite Ishiba's decision to remain as party leader, LDP Councillors Kimi Onoda and Hiroshi Yamada and former Minister of State for Economic Security Takayuki Kobayashi, all considered close to former Minister of State for Economic Security Sanae Takaichi who was the main rival to Ishiba in the leadership election a month prior, called on the party executives to bear responsibilities. Major newspapers Sankei Shimbun, Yomiuri Shimbun, and Asahi Shimbun all ran editorials in their morning editions calling for Ishiba to step down as prime minister, while Mainichi Shimbun raised questions about the feasibility of Ishiba's enthusiasm for reform. A Kyodo News survey also showed on 29 October that the approval rating for the Ishiba Cabinet fell from 50.7% before the election to 32.1% after the vote, although only 28.6% said Ishiba should resign, as compared to 65.7% of the respondents that felt it was unnecessary.

At the party's central executive meeting on 31 October, Komeito leader Keiichi Ishii, who lost his parliamentary seat only a month after he became party leader, announced his resignation, after saying that "there will be many difficulties in continuing as leader" after losing his seat. He was replaced as party minister by Tetsuo Saito following an extraordinary party convention on 9 November.

Ishin, which saw its proportional representation vote count fall by about three million from the previous election, also faced an outpouring of criticism from local assembly members in its home base of Osaka, who blamed the party's initial decision to align itself with the LDP on amending the Political Funds Control Law for the "nationwide headwinds". The prefectural assembly group of the Osaka Restoration Association, the regional party of Ishin, called on the party executives to bear responsibility for the worse-than-expected results in the proportional votes and nationally and hold a party leadership election.

== Government formation ==
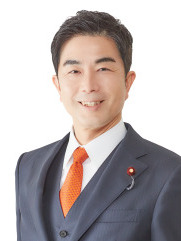
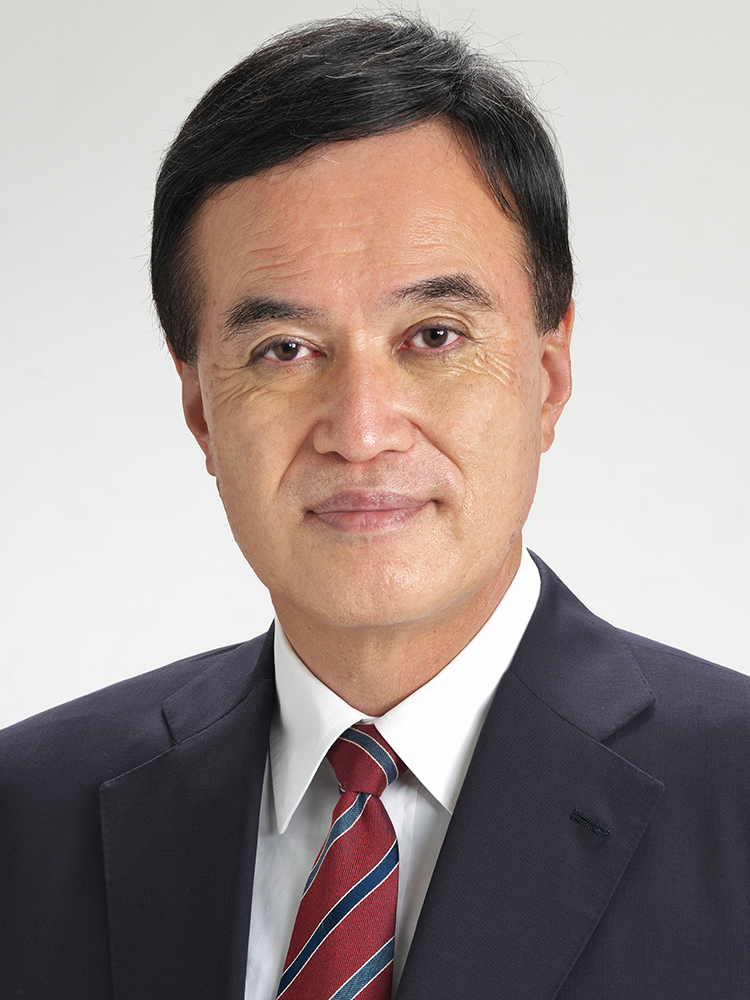
Justice Minister Hideki Makihara (left) and Agriculture Minister Yasuhiro Ozato (right) both lost their seats in the general election, and were thus unable to return to the cabinet.

After the election result showed the LDP-Komeito coalition falling short of a majority by 18 seats, Ishiba confirmed with Komeito leader Keiichi Ishii at a meeting on 28 October that their coalition would continue. While he had ruled out the possibility of forming a coalition with the opposition parties, Ishiba expressed his intention to gain support from Ishin and the DPP through a "partial coalition", i.e. case-by-case support for individual bills. On 30 October, the LDP also brought back to its parliamentary group four members whom it had de-selected due to the fundraising scandal: Hiroshige Seko, Katsuei Hirasawa, Yasutoshi Nishimura and Kōichi Hagiuda, who ran as independents and won. Additionally, the party invited two independents who ran against and defeated LDP-endorsed candidates, Satoshi Mitazono and Ken Hirose, to join the group. This brought the LDP-Komeito coalition to 221 seats, 12 short of a majority.

CDP leader Yoshihiko Noda, the largest winner in the election, said he wanted to prioritize cooperation with Ishin, DPP and JCP, all of which submitted a motion of no confidence against the Ishiba Cabinet in the recent extraordinary Diet session, and held talks with Ishin leader Nobuyuki Baba and JCP leader Tomoko Tamura on 30 October. Mizuho Fukushima, leader of the SDP, which won one seat, signalled a "strong possibility" to vote for Noda in the prime ministerial election, which the party had done in an extraordinary Diet session a month prior.

Both the DPP and the Ishin had ruled out joining an LDP-Komeito government. Ishin Secretary-General Fujita Fumitake expressed his disapproval of joining the LDP-Komeito coalition government or cooperating with the CDP, but stated his intention to hold discussions with each party on a policy-by-policy basis. DPP leader Yuichiro Tamaki said the party would not rule out ad hoc cooperation on certain issues, but would not join the ruling coalition. The party agreed at its executive meeting on 30 October to vote for leader Yuichiro Tamaki, even in the event of a run-off election. In a run-off, all votes not for the top two candidates, Ishiba and Noda, would be deemed invalid, which would benefit Ishiba. Ishin and DPP's proposals which could lead to 70 invalid votes in the run-off, were criticised by CDP Secretary-General Junya Ogawa, who said that the exercise of the right to nominate prime minister was the "heaviest task" of a Diet member.

During the meeting between the LDP and DPP on 31 October, the DPP requested the review of the 1.03-million-yen annual income barrier and basic income tax deductions, in exchange of its support of the LDP government in passing the budget proposal and bills, while the CDP and DPP at a meeting on 5 November agreed to aim to revise the Political Funds Control Act again by the end of the year in order to speed up political reform.

On 11 November, Shigeru Ishiba was reelected as prime minister of a minority government during an extraordinary session of the Diet with 221 votes, defeating Yoshihiko Noda who received 160. This was the first time since the Murayama Cabinet in 1994, that the vote required two rounds. The same day, Ishiba's first cabinet resigned, and a second cabinet was inaugurated. It was agreed that his second cabinet would remain largely the same.
