= Nichiyō Tōron =

Japanese political debate program

Nichiyō Tōron (日曜討論; lit. "Sunday debate"), recently styled with English subtitle as Nihchiyō Tōron Sunday Debate (日曜討論SundayDebate), is a Sunday morning talk show broadcast in Japan by public broadcaster NHK. It often takes the format of a moderated debate between several politicians from parties represented in the National Diet and sometimes leading bureaucrats or non-political guests, although some editions feature interviews with only one guest. Nichiyō Tōron debuted in 1994, but replaced a range of several talk shows on political and economic issues including Kokkai Tōronkai (国会討論会, "Diet forum"), a similar Sunday morning political talk show that had been on air since 1947 on radio and since 1957 on television.

Nichiyō Tōron airs live Sundays between 9 and 10 a.m. JST on national NHK General TV and NHK Radio 1, and is rebroadcast as free-of-charge "NHK international broadcast" (NHK kokusai hōsō) by NHK's international television and radio affiliates. Nationally, it airs just after Fuji TV's Shin Hōdō 2001 and before TV Asahi's Hōdō Station Sunday (formerly: Sunday Frontline), two competing Sunday morning talk shows.

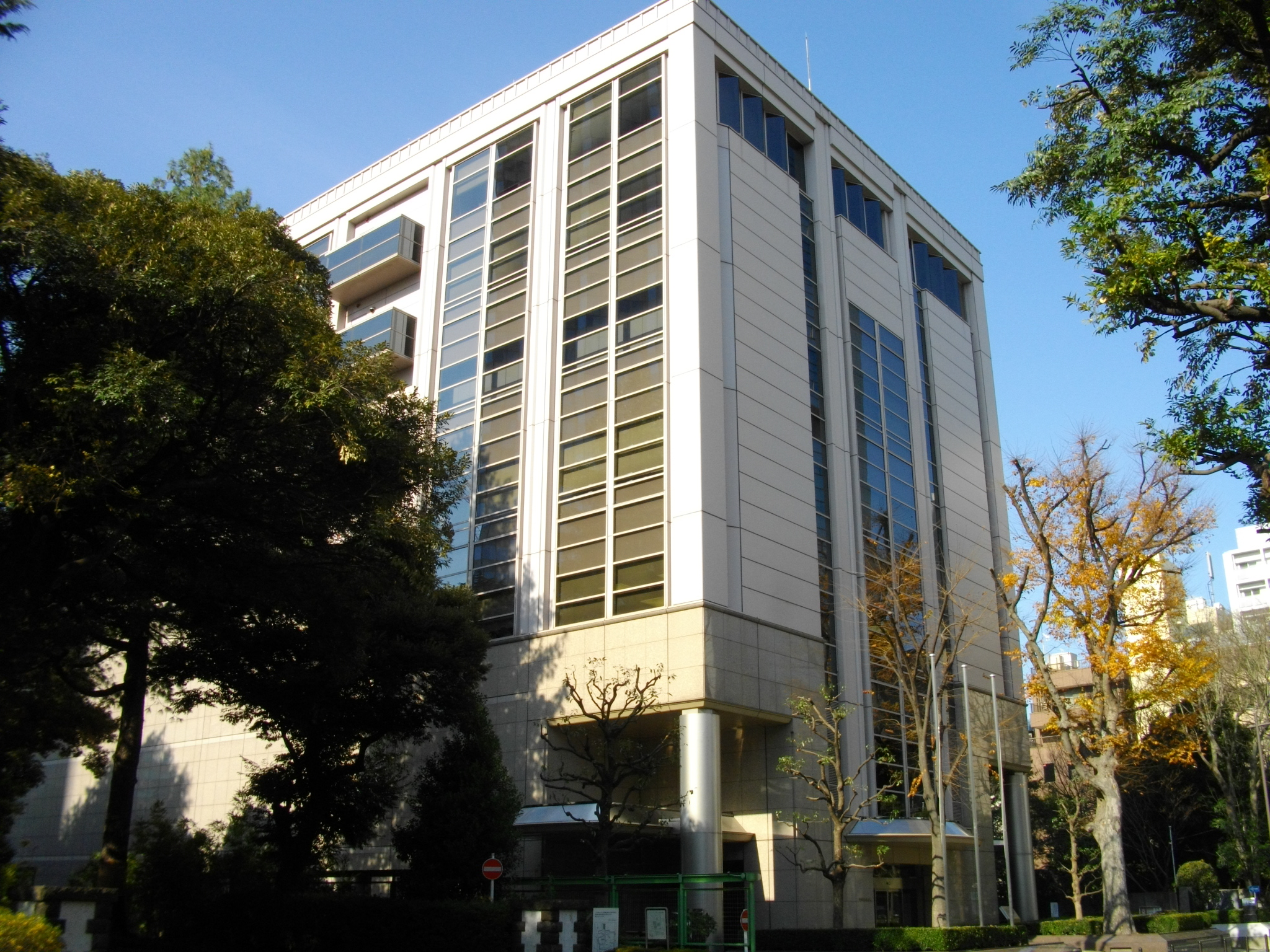
Chiyoda Hōsō Kaikan (lit. "Chiyoda broadcasting hall", "Chiyoda Media Plaza" to foreigners)

As of 2011, it is hosted by Toshio Shimada and Yasuhiro Kashina. The debate is usually held in NHK's Chiyoda Hōsō Kaikan studio in Kioichō in central Tokyo, close to Nagatachō, where the Diet building, the national Liberal Democratic and Democratic party headquarters as well as the prime minister's office (Kantei) and residence (Kōtei) are located.

== Special editions ==
On days of national elections (general elections for the House of Representatives or regular elections for the House of Councillors), political campaigning is restricted by national election laws for 24 hours before the closing of polls and Nichiyō Tōron is not broadcast in its usual slot. On days of by-elections for the national Diet or the unified local elections, Nichiyō Tōron also generally avoids presenting partisan positions by inviting non-politicians. In the legal campaigning period before a national election, Nichiyō Tōron sometimes takes the NHK Special 9 p.m. slot or airs on Monday night after an election. On election night, the Nichiyō Tōron host anchors a special programme with all party leaders relayed from their election headquarters. The first Nichiyō Tōron of a new year usually invites party presidents – or another leading politician where the party president is prime minister, namely the secretary general of the party or the vice prime minister.
