= Kazunori Tanaka =

Japanese politician

- 田中 和徳
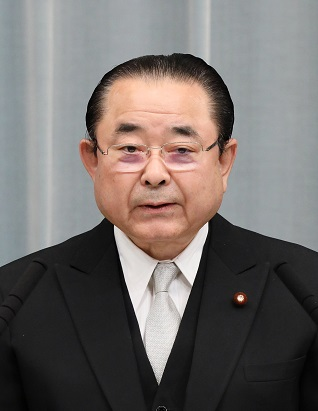
- Kazunori in 2019

Minister for Reconstruction
- In office 11 September 2019 – 16 September 2020
- Prime Minister: Shinzo Abe
- Preceded by: Hiromichi Watanabe
- Succeeded by: Katsuei Hirasawa

Member of the House of Representatives; from Southern Kanto
- Incumbent
- Assumed office 20 October 1996
- Preceded by: Constituency established
- Constituency: PR block (1996–2000); Kanagawa 10th (2000–2009); PR block (2009–2012); Kanagawa 10th (2012–present)

Member of the Kanagawa Prefectural Assembly
- In office 1991–1995
- Constituency: Kawasaki Ward, Kawasaki City

Member of the Kawasaki City Council
- In office 1983–1991
- Constituency: Kawasaki Ward

Personal details
- Born: 21 January 1949 (age 77) Shimonoseki, Yamaguchi, Japan
- Party: Liberal Democratic (Shikōkai)
- Education: Hosei University

Kazunori Tanaka (田中 和徳, Tanaka Kazunori; born 21 January 1949) is a Japanese politician serving in the House of Representatives in the Diet (national legislature) as a member of the Liberal Democratic Party and Minister of Reconstruction. A native of Toyoura District, Yamaguchi and graduate of Hosei University he was elected for the first time in 1996 after serving in local assemblies.

Tanaka was general director of the Liberal Democratic Party International bureau in 2015.

== Overview ==
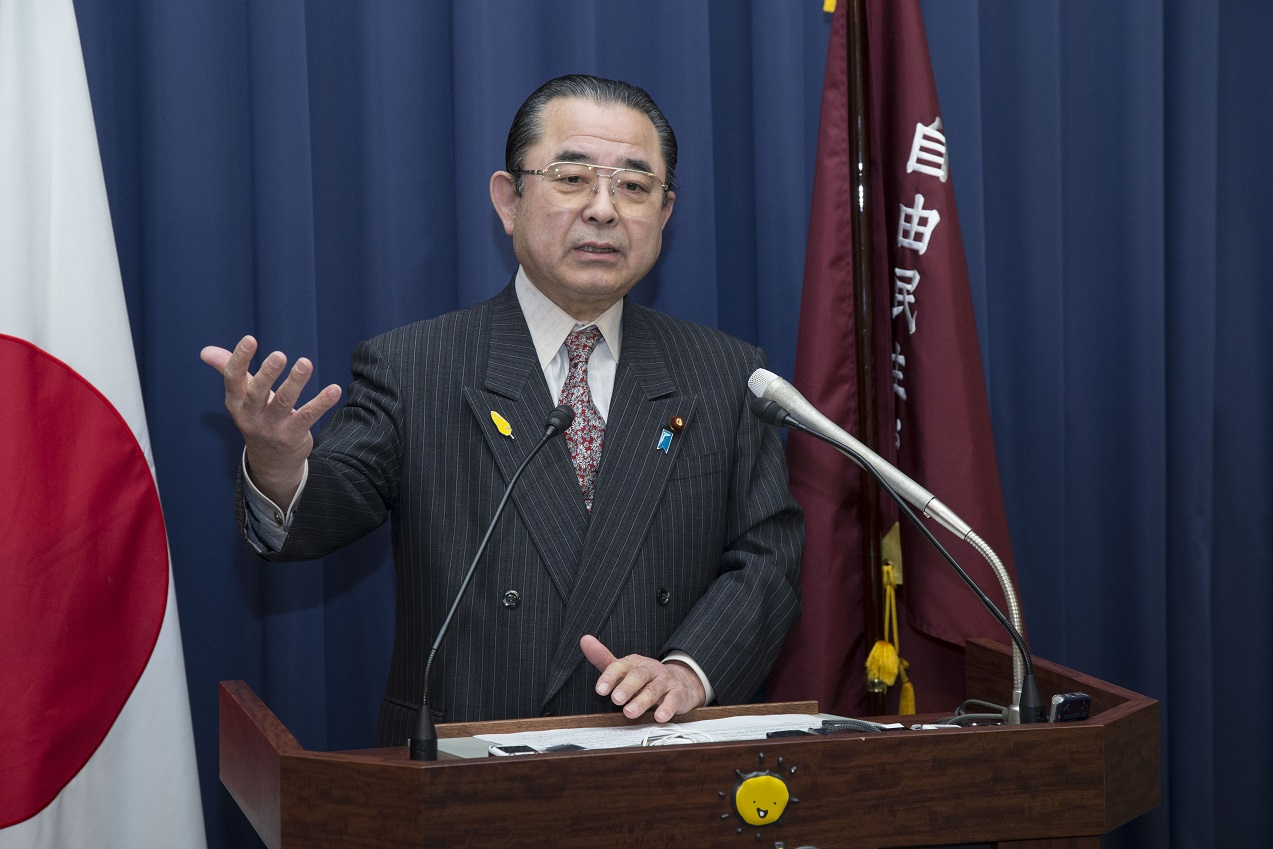
Tanaka at a press conference in 2019

Tanaka was elected to the Kawasaki Municipal Assembly, since then re-elected once, 1983. Then he was elected to the Kanagawa Prefectural Assembly, 1991. He was elected to the House of Representatives for the first time in the 1996 general election. He was Parliamentary Secretary of the Ministry of Land, Infrastructure and Transport in the Cabinet of Prime Minister Junichirō Koizumi in 2001. He was Parliamentary Secretary for Finance in the Cabinet of Prime Minister Junichirō Koizumi in 2002. He was Parliamentary Secretary for Foreign Affairs in the Cabinet of Prime Minister Junichirō Koizumi in 2003.

He was Vice Minister of Finance the Cabinet of Prime Minister Shinzō Abe on 26 September 2006. Tnaka was Senior Vice Minister of Environment the Cabinet of Prime Minister Shinzō Abe on 26 December 2012.

He took office as Minister of Reconstruction since 9 September 2019.

House of Representatives (Japan)
Preceded by Yoshiaki Harada	Chairman of the Committee on Financial Affairs; 2008–2009	Succeeded by Kōichirō Genba
Preceded by Ryū Shionoya	Chairman of the Deliberative Council on Political Ethics; 2024–present	Incumbent
Political offices
Preceded by Hiromichi Watanabe	Minister for Reconstruction; 2019–2020	Succeeded by Katsuei Hirasawa
Party political offices
Preceded by Wataru Takeshita	Chief of the Party Organisation and Movement Headquarters, Liberal Democratic Party; 2014–2015	Succeeded by Taimei Yamaguchi
Preceded by Yasukazu Hamada	Director of the International Bureau, Liberal Democratic Party; 2015–2017	Succeeded by Teru Fukui
