= First Abe cabinet =

90th Cabinet of Japan (2006–2007)

- 90th Cabinet of Japan
- 26 September 2006 – 26 September 2007
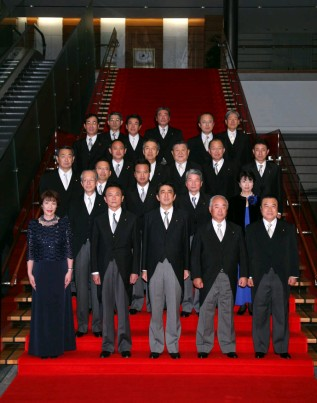
- Prime Minister Shinzo Abe (front row, centre) with the newly-elected cabinet inside the Kantei, September 26, 2006
- Date formed: September 26, 2006
- Date dissolved: September 26, 2007

People and organisations
- Head of state: Emperor Akihito
- Head of government: Shinzo Abe
- Member party: LDP–NKP Coalition
- Status in legislature: HoR: LDP-K Coalition supermajority HoC: LDP-K Coalition majority
- Opposition party: Democratic Party of Japan
- Opposition leader: Ichirō Ozawa

History
- Election: 2007 councillors election
- Legislature term: 172th National Diet
- Predecessor: Koizumi III
- Successor: Yasuo Fukuda

The First Abe cabinet governed Japan under the leadership of Prime Minister Shinzo Abe from September 2006 to September 2007. The government was a coalition between the Liberal Democratic Party and the Komeito and controlled both the upper and lower houses of the National Diet.The cabinet faced policy issues regarding government debts and the shrinking population.

At a joint press conference Hakuo Yanagisawa, who was appointed Minister of Health, Labour and Welfare, spoke to a number of issues including reform of the Social Insurance Agency, measures against the decline in the birthrate, the unification of the Employees Pension Plan and the Mutual Pension Plan for public servants, and revision of labor-related laws.

At the onset Prime Minister Abe's approval rating was 70%, but dropped to 30% prior to the 2007 House of Councilors election, which resulted in the LDP losing the Upper House to the Democratic Party of Japan and becoming the second party for the first time in its history. Abe subsequently resigned, citing health reasons. Abe was criticized for not explaining his thinking enough to show where Japan was going.

== Background ==
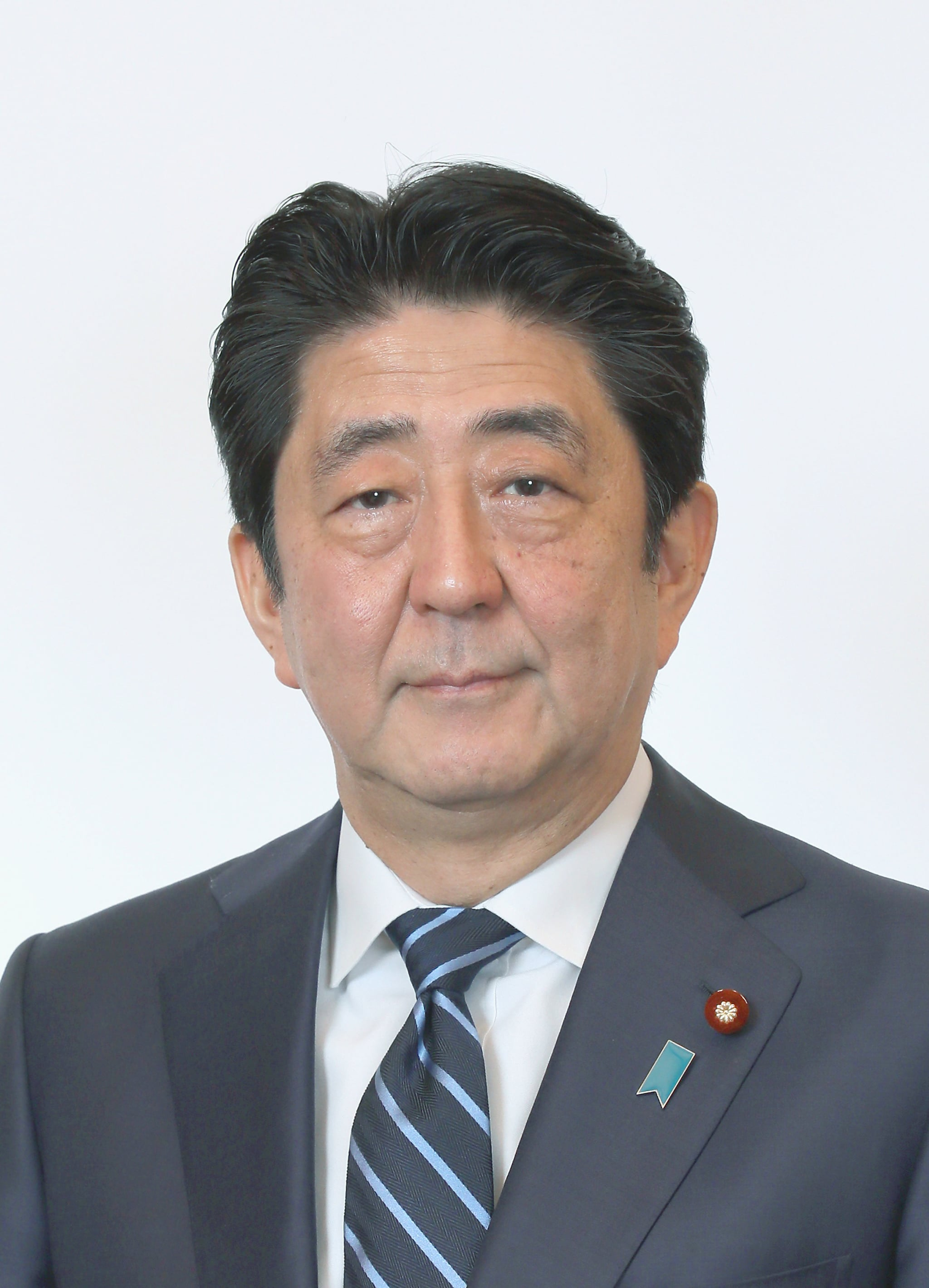
Prime Minister Shinzō Abe

Abe was elected to the House of Representatives in 1993, and by 1999 was serving as Director of the Committee on Health and Welfare, and as Director of the Social Affairs Division of the Liberal Democratic Party. In 2003, Abe was elected Secretary General of the Liberal Democratic Party, and two years later became Chief Cabinet Secretary.

Abe took office as the first Japanese Prime Minister born in the postwar period.

== Election of the prime minister ==
Abe succeeded Prime Minister Junichiro Koizumi. He maintained Koizumi's emphasis on the U.S.-Japan alliance as the basis of national defense, but he wanted Japan to be a more equal partner. One goal of his administration was to revise Japan's constitution to normalize the use of military force.

26 September 2006 Absolute majority (238/475) required
House of Representatives
Choice	First Vote
Choice	Votes
Shinzo Abe	339 / 475
Ichirō Ozawa	136 / 475

26 September 2006 Absolute majority (121/240) required
House of Councillors
Choice	First Vote
Choice	Votes
Shinzo Abe	136 / 240
Ichirō Ozawa	104 / 240

== Lists of ministers ==
Liberal Democratic
New Komeito
Independent
R = Member of the House of Representatives
C = Member of the House of Councillors

=== Cabinet ===
Abe announced his Cabinet on September 26, 2006. The largest Mori faction in the Liberal Democratic Party received the most appointments.

First Abe Cabinet from September 26, 2006 to August 27, 2007
Portfolio	Minister		Term of office
Prime Minister	Shinzo Abe	R	September 26, 2006 – September 26, 2007
Minister for Internal Affairs and Communications; Minister of State for Decentralization Reform; Minister of State for Privatization of the Postal Services	Yoshihide Suga	R	September 26, 2006 – August 27, 2007
Minister of Justice	Jinen Nagase	R	September 26, 2006 – August 27, 2007
Minister of Foreign Affairs	Tarō Asō	R	October 31, 2005 – August 27, 2007
Minister of Finance	Kōji Omi	R	September 26, 2006 – August 27, 2007
Minister of Education, Culture, Sports, Science and Technology	Bunmei Ibuki	R	September 26, 2006 – September 26, 2007
Minister of Health, Labour, and Welfare	Hakuo Yanagisawa	R	September 26, 2006 – August 27, 2007
Minister of Agriculture, Forestry and Fisheries	Toshikatsu Matsuoka	C	September 26, 2006 – May 28, 2007
Minister of Agriculture, Forestry and Fisheries	Masatoshi Wakabayashi	C	May 28, 2007 – June 1, 2007
Minister of Agriculture, Forestry and Fisheries	Norihiko Akagi	R	June 1, 2007 – August 1, 2007
Minister of Agriculture, Forestry and Fisheries	Masatoshi Wakabayashi	C	August 1, 2007 – August 27, 2007
Minister of Economy, Trade and Industry	Akira Amari	R	September 26, 2006 – August 2, 2008
Ministry of Land, Infrastructure, Transport and Tourism; Minister for Ocean Policy	Tetsuzo Fuyushiba	R	September 26, 2006 – August 2, 2008
Minister of the Environment; Minister in Charge of Global Environmental Problems	Masatoshi Wakabayashi	C	September 26, 2006 – August 27, 2007
Minister of Defense	Fumio Kyūma	R	January 9, 2007 – July 4, 2007
Minister of Defense	Yuriko Koike	R	July 4, 2007 – August 27, 2007
Chief Cabinet Secretary	Yasuhisa Shiozaki	R	September 26, 2006 – August 27, 2007
Minister of State, Chairman of the National Public Safety Commission; Minister of State for Disaster Management	Kensei Mizote	C	September 26, 2006 – August 27, 2007
Minister of State for Okinawa and Northern Territories Affairs; Minister of State for Science and Technology Policy; Minister of State for Innovation; Minister of State for Gender Equality; Minister of State for Social Affairs and Food Safety	Sanae Takaichi	R	September 26, 2006 – August 27, 2007
Minister of State for Financial Services	Yuji Yamamoto	R	September 26, 2006 – August 27, 2007
Minister of State for Economic and Fiscal Policy	Hiroko Ōta	–	September 26, 2006 – September 26, 2007
Minister of State for Regulatory Reform	Genichiro Sata	R	September 26, 2006 – December 28, 2006
Minister of State for Regulatory Reform	Yoshimi Watanabe	R	December 28, 2006 – August 27, 2007
Deputy Secretaries
Deputy Chief Cabinet Secretary (Political Affairs – House of Representatives)	Hakubun Shimomura	R	September 26, 2006 – August 27, 2007
Deputy Chief Cabinet Secretary (Political Affairs – House of Councillors)	Seiji Suzuki	C	October 31, 2005 – August 27, 2007
Deputy Chief Cabinet Secretary (Bureaucrat)	Junzo Sotoba	–	September 26, 2006 – September 26, 2007

==== Changes ====
- December 28, 2006 – Regulatory Reform Genichiro Sata resigned and was replaced by Yoshimi Watanabe.
- January 9, 2007 – A new position of Defense Minister was created, Fumio Kyūma was appointed the inaugural minister.
- May 28, 2007 – Agriculture Minister Toshikatsu Matsuoka committed suicide and was replaced by Norihiko Akagi.
- July 3, 2007 – Defense Minister Fumio Kyūma resigned and was replaced by Yuriko Koike.
- August 1, 2007 – Agriculture Minister Norihiko Akagi committed suicide and was replaced by Masatoshi Wakabayashi.

=== Reshuffled cabinet ===
First Abe Cabinet (Reshuffle)
- 90th Cabinet of Japan

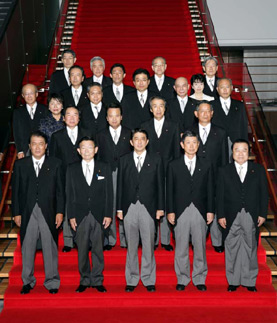
- Prime Minister Shinzo Abe (front row, centre) with his reshuffled cabinet inside the Kantei, August 27, 2007
- Date formed: August 27, 2007
- Date dissolved: September 26, 2007

People and organisations
- Head of state: Emperor Akihito
- Head of government: Shinzo Abe
- Member party: LDP–NKP Coalition
- Status in legislature: HoR: LDP-K Coalition supermajority HoC: LDP-K Coalition majority
- Opposition party: Democratic Party of Japan
- Opposition leader: Ichirō Ozawa

History
- Election: 2007 councillors election
- Legislature term: 172th National Diet
- Predecessor: First Abe Cabinet
- Successor: Yasuo Fukuda Cabinet

First Abe Cabinet from August 27, 2007 to September 26, 2007
Portfolio	Minister		Term of office
Prime Minister	Shinzo Abe	R	September 26, 2006 – September 26, 2006
Minister for Internal Affairs and Communications; Minister of State for Decentralization Reform; Minister of State for Correcting Regional Disparities; Minister of State for Regional Government (doshu-sei); Minister of State for Privatization of the Postal Services	Hiroya Masuda	–	August 27, 2007 – September 24, 2008
Minister of Justice	Kunio Hatoyama	R	August 27, 2007 – August 2, 2008
Minister of Foreign Affairs	Nobutaka Machimura	R	August 27, 2007 – September 26, 2007
Minister of Finance	Fukushiro Nukaga	R	August 27, 2007 – August 2, 2008
Minister of Education, Culture, Sports, Science and Technology	Bunmei Ibuki	R	September 26, 2006 – September 26, 2007
Minister of Health, Labour, and Welfare	Yōichi Masuzoe	C	August 27, 2007 – September 26, 2009
Minister of Agriculture, Forestry and Fisheries	Takehiko Endo	R	August 27, 2007 – September 3, 2007
Minister of Agriculture, Forestry and Fisheries	Masatoshi Wakabayashi	C	September 3, 2007 – August 2, 2008
Minister of Economy, Trade and Industry	Akira Amari	R	September 26, 2006 – August 2, 2008
Ministry of Land, Infrastructure, Transport and Tourism; Minister for Ocean Policy	Tetsuzo Fuyushiba	R	September 26, 2006 – August 2, 2008
Minister of the Environment; Minister in Charge of Global Environmental Problems	Ichirō Kamoshita	R	August 27, 2007 – August 2, 2008
Minister of Defense	Masahiko Kōmura	R	August 27, 2007 – September 26, 2007
Chief Cabinet Secretary; Minister of State for the Abduction Issue	Kaoru Yosano	R	August 27, 2007 – September 26, 2007
Minister of State, Chairman of the National Public Safety Commission; Minister of State for Disaster Management and Food Safety	Shinya Izumi	C	August 27, 2007 – September 26, 2007
Minister of State for Okinawa and Northern Territories Affairs; Minister of State for Quality-of-Life Policy; Minister of State for Science and Technology Policy; Minister of State for "Challenge Again" Initiative; Minister of State for Regulatory Reform	Fumio Kishida	R	August 27, 2007 – September 26, 2007
Minister of State for Financial Services and Administrative Reform	Yoshimi Watanabe	R	August 27, 2007 – September 24, 2008
Minister of State for Economic and Fiscal Policy	Hiroko Ōta	–	September 26, 2006 – September 24, 2008
Minister of State for Gender Equality and Social Affairs	Yōko Kamikawa	R	September 26, 2006 – September 24, 2008
Deputy Secretaries
Deputy Chief Cabinet Secretary (Political Affairs – House of Representatives)	Matsushige Ono	R	August 27, 2007 – September 26, 2007
Deputy Chief Cabinet Secretary (Political Affairs – House of Councillors)	Mitsuhide Iwaki	C	August 27, 2007 – September 24, 2008
Deputy Chief Cabinet Secretary (Bureaucrat)	Junzo Sotoba	–	September 26, 2006 – September 26, 2007

==== Changes ====
- September 3, 2007 – Agriculture Minister Takehiko Endo resigned and was replaced by his immediate predecessor Masatoshi Wakabayashi.
