= Nagano 1st district =

Legislative district of Japan

Nagano 1st District
- Parliamentary constituency for the Japanese House of Representatives
- Numbered map of Nagano Prefecture single-member districts
- Prefecture: Nagano
- Proportional District: Hokurikushin'etsu
- Electorate: 424,275

Current constituency
- Created: 1994
- Seats: One
- Party: LDP
- Representative: Kenta Wakabayashi
- Municipalities: Iiyama, Nakano, Suzaka, part of Nagano, Kamitakai District, Shimominochi District, and Shimotakai District

Nagano 1st district (長野県第1区, Nagano-ken dai-ikku or simply 長野1区, Nagano-ikku) is a single-member constituency of the House of Representatives in the national Diet of Japan located in Nagano Prefecture.

== List of representatives ==
Election	Representative	Party	Notes
1996	Kenji Kosaka	New Frontier	
2000	Kenji Kosaka	Liberal Democratic	
2003	Kenji Kosaka	Liberal Democratic	
2005	Kenji Kosaka	Liberal Democratic	
2009	Takashi Shinohara	Democratic	
2012	Takashi Shinohara	Democratic	
2014	Takashi Shinohara	Democratic	
2017	Takashi Shinohara	Independent	
2021	Kenta Wakabayashi	Liberal Democratic	
2024	Takashi Shinohara	CDP	
2026	Kenta Wakabayashi	Liberal Democratic	

== Election results ==
2026
Party	Candidate	Votes	%	±%
LDP	Kenta Wakabayashi	119,101	50.70	▲11.67
Centrist Reform	Takashi Shinohara (incumbent)	86,458	36.80	▼9.46
Ishin	Kiyoshi Wakasa (Elected to the PR Block	29,366	12.50	▼2.21
Turnout		234,925	58.25	▲2.51
LDP gain from Centrist Reform				

2024
Party	Candidate	Votes	%	±%
CDP	Takashi Shinohara (pr incumbent)	105,231	46.26	5.03
LDP	Kenta Wakabayashi (incumbent) (endorsed by Komeito)	88,792	39.03	▼12.26
Ishin	Kiyoshi Wakasa	33,470	14.71	
Turnout		227,493	55.74	▼4.00
CDP gain from LDP				

2021
Party	Candidate	Votes	%	±%
Liberal Democratic	Kenta Wakabayashi	128,423	51.29	▲16.26
CDP	Takashi Shinohara (Incumbent) (elected by Hokurikushin'etsu PR block)	121,962	48.71	New
Registered electors		425,440		
Turnout			59.74	▲2.36
LDP gain from CDP				

2017
Party	Candidate	Votes	%	±%
Independent	Takashi Shinohara (Incumbent)	131,883	54.06	New
Liberal Democratic	Yutaka Komatsu (Incumbent-Hokurikushin'etsu PR block)	85,460	35.03	▼0.23
Innovation	Masayuki Hashimoto	22,817	9.35	New
Society for Making Nagano Prefecture the Best Economy in Japan	Yukinari Komamura	18,675	1.55	New
Registered electors		432,700		
Turnout			57.38	▲6.79
Independent hold				

2014
Party	Candidate	Votes	%	±%
Democratic	Takashi Shinohara (Incumbent)	96,333	45.82	▲9.22
Liberal Democratic	Yutaka Komatsu (Incumbent-Hokurikushin'etsu PR block) (reelected by Hokurikushin'etsu PR block)	74,137	35.26	▲2.56
Communist	Ryosuke Takeda	26,903	12.80	▲1.70
Future Generations	Takahito Miyazawa (Incumbent-Hokurikushin'etsu PR block)	12,888	6.13	New
Registered electors		425,446		
Turnout			50.59	▼8.17
Democratic hold				

2012
Party	Candidate	Votes	%	±%
Democratic	Takashi Shinohara (Incumbent)	89,400	36.60	▼14.67
Liberal Democratic	Yutaka Komatsu (elected by Hokurikushin'etsu PR block)	79,860	32.70	▼6.70
Restoration	Takahito Miyazawa (elected by Hokurikushin'etsu PR block)	47,870	19.60	New
Communist	Ryosuke Takeda	27,119	11.10	▲2.57
Registered electors		427,377		
Turnout			58.76	▼15.51
Democratic hold				

2009
Party	Candidate	Votes	%	±%
Democratic	Takashi Shinohara (Incumbent-Hokurikushin'etsu PR block)	161,543	51.27	▲10.45
Liberal Democratic	Kenji Kosaka (Incumbent)	124,136	39.40	▼8.04
Communist	Norihira Yamaguchi	26,872	8.53	▼3.21
Happiness Realization	Motofumi Yokota	2,535	0.80	New
Registered electors		429,859		
Turnout			74.27	▲4.09
Democratic gain from LDP				

2005
Party	Candidate	Votes	%	±%
Liberal Democratic	Kenji Kosaka (Incumbent)	140,831	47.44	▲2.49
Democratic	Takashi Shinohara (Incumbent-Hokurikushin'etsu PR block) (reelected by Hokurikushin'etsu PR block)	121,185	40.82	▼1.76
Communist	Sanae Nakano	34,869	11.74	▼0.73
Registered electors		430,657		
Turnout			70.18	▲7.77
LDP hold				

2003
Party	Candidate	Votes	%	±%
Liberal Democratic	Kenji Kosaka (Incumbent)	118,065	44.95	▼3.76
Democratic	Takashi Shinohara (elected by Hokurikushin'etsu PR block)	111,821	42.58	▲11.40
Communist	Sanae Nakano	32,757	12.47	▼7.64
Registered electors		429,585		
Turnout			62.41	▼0.59
LDP hold				

2000
Party	Candidate	Votes	%	±%
Liberal Democratic	Kenji Kosaka (Incumbent)	127,010	48.71	▲25.64
Democratic	Yoshikazu Kanakubo	81,289	31.18	New
Communist	Sanae Nakano	52,445	20.11	▲12.59
Turnout			63.00	
LDP hold				

1996
Party	Candidate	Votes	%	±%
New Frontier	Kenji Kosaka	118,386	41.76	New
New Party Sakigake	Shusei Tanaka	78,401	27.65	New
Liberal Democratic	Masatoshi Wakabayashi	65,403	23.07	New
Communist	Kazuhiro Miyagawa	21,329	7.52	New
Turnout				
