= Munenori Akagi =

Japanese politician (1904-1993)

- 赤城 宗徳
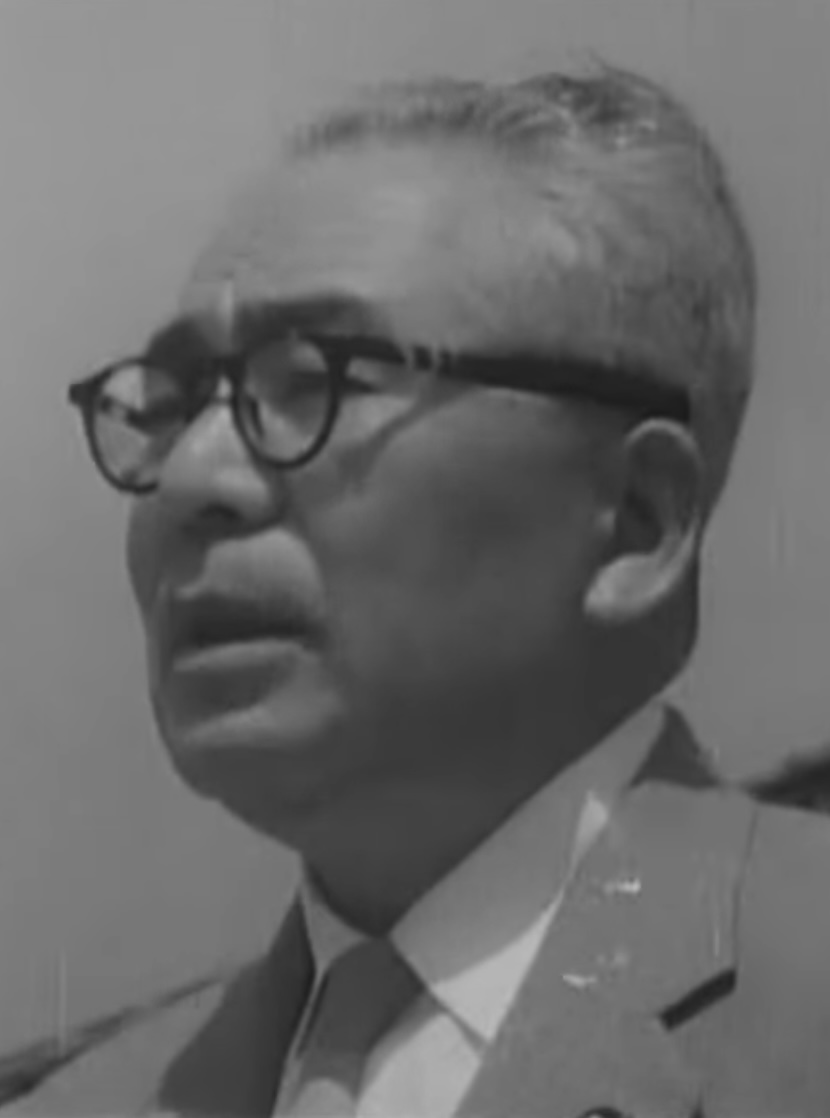
- Akagi in 1959

Minister of Agriculture and Forestry
- In office 5 July 1971 – 7 July 1972
- Prime Minister: Eisaku Satō
- Preceded by: Tadao Kuraishi
- Succeeded by: Tokurō Adachi
- In office 18 July 1963 – 3 June 1965
- Prime Minister: Hayato Ikeda; Eisaku Satō
- Preceded by: Seishi Shigemasa
- Succeeded by: Eiichi Sakata
- In office 10 July 1957 – 12 June 1958
- Prime Minister: Nobusuke Kishi
- Preceded by: Ichitarō Ide
- Succeeded by: Kunio Miura

Director-General of the Japan Defense Agency
- In office 18 June 1959 – 19 July 1960
- Prime Minister: Nobusuke Kishi
- Preceded by: Shigejirō Inō
- Succeeded by: Masumi Esaki

Chief Cabinet Secretary
- In office 12 June 1958 – 18 June 1959
- Prime Minister: Nobusuke Kishi
- Preceded by: Kiichi Aichi
- Succeeded by: Etsusaburo Shiina

Member of the House of Representatives
- In office 7 October 1979 – 24 January 1990
- Preceded by: Jūjirō Tosaka
- Succeeded by: Norihiko Akagi
- Constituency: Ibaraki 3rd
- In office 1 October 1952 – 9 December 1976
- Preceded by: Akira Suzuki
- Succeeded by: Kishirō Nakamura
- Constituency: Ibaraki 3rd
- In office 30 April 1942 – 18 December 1945
- Preceded by: Goro Iimura
- Succeeded by: Constituency abolished
- Constituency: Ibaraki 3rd
- In office 30 April 1937 – 14 February 1938
- Preceded by: Kumekichi Yamamoto
- Succeeded by: Kumekichi Yamamoto
- Constituency: Ibaraki 3rd

Member of the Ibaraki Prefectural Assembly
- In office 1935–1944

Personal details
- Born: 2 December 1904 Makabe, Ibaraki, Japan
- Died: 11 November 1993 (aged 88)
- Party: Liberal Democratic
- Other political affiliations: Independent (1935–1942); IRAA (1942–1945); NDB (1945); JCP (1945–1946); LP (1952–1954); JDP (1954–1955)
- Relatives: Norihiko Akagi (grandson)
- Education: Tokyo Imperial University

Munenori Akagi (赤城 宗徳, Akagi Munenori; December 2, 1904 – November 11, 1993) was a Japanese politician and historian who served three times as Minister of Agriculture and once as Director of the Japan Defense Agency (now the Ministry of Defense).

== Life and career ==
Akagi was born in Ueno Village, Makabe District, Ibaraki Prefecture on December 2, 1904. After graduating from Tokyo Imperial University's Faculty of Law, he was elected mayor of his home village. In 1937, he ran for and was successfully elected to the House of Representatives of the National Diet. Following Japan's defeat in World War II, he was purged from the government by the U.S. Occupation of Japan for having supported Japanese militarism during the war, but won his old Diet seat back after the Occupation ended in 1952.

In 1957, Akagi joined the cabinet of Prime Minister Nobusuke Kishi as Minister of Agriculture, the first of three stints in this role. In 1959, he transitioned to a role as Director of the Defense Agency. At the height of the massive 1960 Anpo protests against the U.S.-Japan Security Treaty, in his role as Defense Agency Chief, Akagi strenuously opposed Kishi's proposal to deploy the Japan Self Defense Forces to forcibly suppress the protestors, arguing from a conservative perspective that such an action might instigate a mass popular uprising, and instead Kishi was left with no other option but to resign in disgrace.

In his role as Minister of Agriculture, Akagi became involved in negotiating various disputes between Japan and the Soviet Union. In 1958, he negotiated a compromise regarding salmon fishing in the Sea of Okhotsk. In 1965, he was dispatched to the Soviet Union to negotiate a modus vivendi between the two nations regarding fishing in the disputed southern Kuril Islands. In 1971, a dispute broke out between Japan and the Soviet Union over the right to catch crabs in the Sea of Okhotsk. The dispute hinged on the issue of whether crabs only crawl or can also swim. If crabs only crawl, then they would have been considered part of the Soviet Union's continental shelf and Japanese fishermen would have been banned from catching them, but if crabs can also swim then the Japanese would have been allowed to catch them. Once again, Akagi was dispatched to Moscow by Prime Minister Eisaku Satō to negotiate a compromise.

Akagi was also a historian of medieval Japan, and published several books about the life of 10th century samurai warrior Taira no Masakado.
