= Sadatoshi Ozato =

Japanese politician (1930–2016)

- 小里 貞利
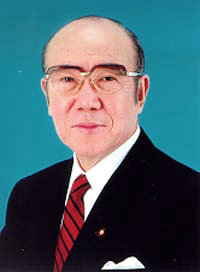
- Official portrait, 1998

Director-General of the Management and Coordination Agency
- In office 22 September 1997 – 30 July 1998
- Prime Minister: Ryutaro Hashimoto
- Preceded by: Takayuki Satō
- Succeeded by: Seiichi Ota

Director-General of the Hokkaido Development Agency
- In office 30 June 1994 – 20 January 1995
- Prime Minister: Tomiichi Murayama
- Preceded by: Moriyoshi Satō
- Succeeded by: Kiyoshi Ozawa

Director-General of the Okinawa Development Agency
- In office 30 June 1994 – 20 January 1995
- Prime Minister: Tomiichi Murayama
- Preceded by: Moriyoshi Satō
- Succeeded by: Kiyoshi Ozawa

Minister of Labour
- In office 29 December 1990 – 5 November 1991
- Prime Minister: Toshiki Kaifu
- Preceded by: Shunpei Tsukahara
- Succeeded by: Tetsuo Kondo

Member of the House of Representatives
- In office 7 October 1979 – 8 August 2005
- Preceded by: Tatsui Chūman
- Succeeded by: Yasuhiro Ozato
- Constituency: Kagoshima 2nd (1979–1996); Kagoshima 4th (1996–2005)

Speaker of the Kagoshima Prefectural Assembly
- In office August 1975 – September 1979

Member of the Kagoshima Prefectural Assembly
- In office 1959–1979

Personal details
- Born: 17 August 1930 Kirishima, Kagoshima, Japan
- Died: 14 December 2016 (aged 86) Kagoshima, Japan
- Party: Liberal Democratic
- Children: Yasuhiro Ozato
- Education: Kajiki High School

Sadatoshi Ozato (小里貞利, Ozato Sadatoshi; 17 August 1930 – 14 December 2016) was a Japanese politician.

== Political career ==
Born in Kirishima, Kagoshima, Ozato's first electoral victory came at the prefectural level in 1959. He served the Kagoshima Prefectural Assembly until 1979, when he was elected to the House of Representatives for Kagoshima 2nd district. In December 1990, Ozato was named Labour Minister. From 1994 to 1995, he led the Okinawa and Hokkaido development agencies. In January 1995, the Great Hanshin earthquake hit Japan, and Ozato was reassigned to handle disaster relief. From 1996 on, he began running for the legislative seat in Kagoshima's fourth district.

Ozato was a member of the Kōchikai faction of the Liberal Democratic Party, originally under the leadership of Kiichi Miyazawa. Soon after Koichi Kato became faction leader the faction split, but Ozato remained affiliated with Kato. Ozato succeeded Koko Sato as director of the Management and Co-ordination Agency in 1997. Ozato was appointed to lead the Liberal Democratic Party's Executive Council in 2000, replacing Yukihiko Ikeda, but stepped down at the end of the year. Kanezo Muraoka took the position. Ozato was awarded a fourth class Order of the Rising Sun in 2001. He retired from politics in 2005, choosing not to declare his candidacy for that year's elections. Ozato died in 2016 at the age of 86.

== Personal life ==
His son is Yasuhiro Ozato.
