= Norikazu Suzuki =

Japanese politician (born 1982)

- 鈴木 憲和
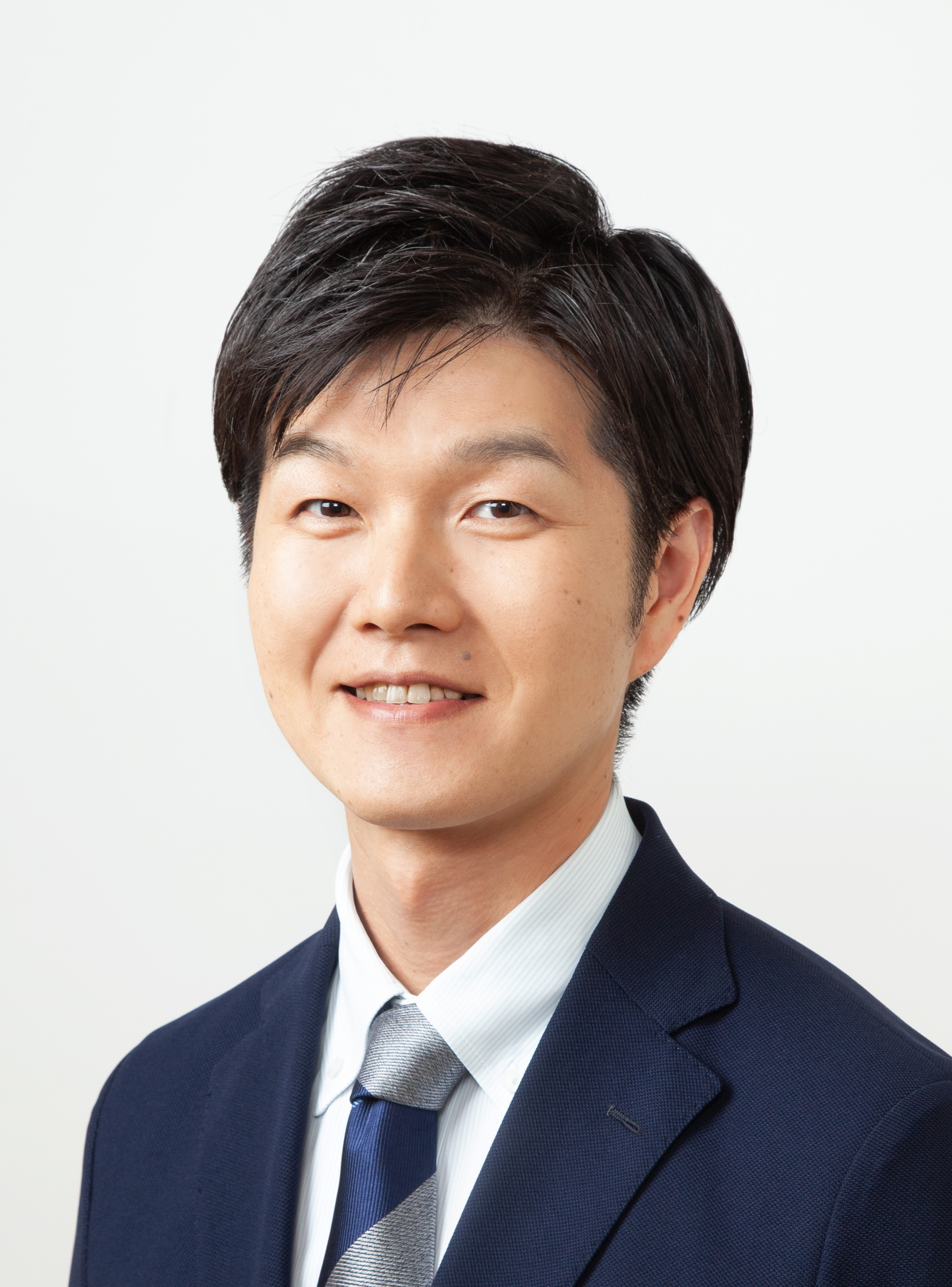
- Official portrait, 2024

Minister of Agriculture, Forestry and Fisheries
- In office 21 October 2025 – 17 September 2026
- Prime Minister: Sanae Takaichi
- Preceded by: Shinjirō Koizumi
- Succeeded by: Kazuo Yana

Member of the House of Representatives
- Incumbent
- Assumed office 18 December 2012
- Preceded by: Yōsuke Kondō
- Constituency: Yamagata 2nd

Personal details
- Born: 30 January 1982 (age 44) Tokyo, Japan
- Party: Liberal Democratic
- Education: University of Tokyo

Norikazu Suzuki (鈴木憲和, Suzuki Norikazu; born 30 January 1982) is a Japanese politician serving as the Minister of Agriculture, Forestry and Fisheries since October 2025. He also serves as a member of the House of Representatives for the Liberal Democratic Party since 2012. He served as State Minister for Reconstruction from 2024 to 2025, before being appointed as Minister of Agriculture, Forestry and Fisheries on 21 October 2025.
