= Yamagata 2nd district =

Japan House of Representatives constituency

Yamagata 2nd District
- Parliamentary constituency for the Japanese House of Representatives
- Numbered map of Yamagata Prefecture single-member districts
- Prefecture: Yamagata
- Proportional District: Tohoku
- Electorate: 295,205

Current constituency
- Created: 1994
- Seats: One
- Party: Liberal Democratic
- Representative: Norikazu Suzuki
- Municipalities: Higashine, Murayama, Nagai, Nan'yō, Obanazawa, Sagae, Yonezawa, Higashiokitama District, Kitamurayama District, Nishimurayama District and Nishiokitama District

Yamagata 2nd district (山形県第2区, Yamagata-ken dai-niku or simply 山形2区, Yamagata-niku) is a single-member constituency of the House of Representatives in the national Diet of Japan located in Yamagata Prefecture.

== List of representatives ==
Election	Representative	Party	Notes
1996	Takehiko Endo	Independent	
2000	Takehiko Endo	Liberal Democratic	
2003	Takehiko Endo	Liberal Democratic	
2005	Takehiko Endo	Liberal Democratic	
2009	Yōsuke Kondō	Democratic	
2012	Norikazu Suzuki	Liberal Democratic	
2014	Norikazu Suzuki	Liberal Democratic	
2017	Norikazu Suzuki	Liberal Democratic	
2021	Norikazu Suzuki	Liberal Democratic	
2024	Norikazu Suzuki	Liberal Democratic	

== Election results ==
2026
Party	Candidate	Votes	%	±%
Liberal Democratic	Norikazu Suzuki (Incumbent)	124,512	68.3	▲11.65
DPP	Daijiro Kikucho	49,804	27.3	▼2.99
Communist	Koji Iwamoto	7,919	4.3	▼0.27
Registered electors		295,205		
Turnout		182,235	62.70%	▼0.04
LDP hold				

2024
Party	Candidate	Votes	%	±%
Liberal Democratic	Norikazu Suzuki (Incumbent)	105,416	56.65	▼5.19
DPP	Daijiro Kikucho	56,359	30.29	▼7.87
RS	Ritobe Touma	15,811	8.50	New
Communist	Koji Iwamoto	8,496	4.57	
Registered electors		313,967		
Turnout		186,082	62.74%	▼2.97
LDP hold				

2021
Party	Candidate	Votes	%	±%
Liberal Democratic	Norikazu Suzuki (Incumbent)	125,992	61.84	
DPP	Kenichi Kato	77,742	38.16	New
Registered electors		313,967		
Turnout			65.71	▲0.08
LDP hold				

2017
Party	Candidate	Votes	%	±%
Liberal Democratic	Norikazu Suzuki (Incumbent)	109,949	51.64	
Kibō no Tō	Yōsuke Kondō (Incumbent-Tohoku PR block)	92,035	43.23	New
Communist	Koji Iwamoto	10,923	5.13	
Registered electors		328,854		
Turnout			65.63	▲4.54
LDP hold				

2014
Party	Candidate	Votes	%	±%
Liberal Democratic	Norikazu Suzuki (Incumbent)	97,915	49.10	
Democratic	Yōsuke Kondō (Incumbent-Tohoku PR block) (re-elected by Tohoku PR block)	90,420	45.34	
Communist	Sumiko Shiranezawa	11,086	5.56	
Registered electors		331,726		
Turnout			61.09	▼5.03
LDP hold				

2012
Party	Candidate	Votes	%	±%
Liberal Democratic	Norikazu Suzuki	100,744	46.06	
Democratic	Yōsuke Kondō (Incumbent) (elected by Tohoku PR block)	81,832	37.41	
Restoration	Hiroaki Kawano	26,358	12.05	New
Communist	Koji Iwamoto	9,809	4.60	
Registered electors		337,290		
Turnout			66.12	▼9.10
LDP gain from Democratic				

2009
Party	Candidate	Votes	%	±%
Democratic	Yōsuke Kondō (Incumbent-Tohoku PR block)	166,287	65.53	
Liberal Democratic	Hironori Suzuki	80,995	31.92	
Happiness Realization	Katsuhiko Goto	6,459	2.55	New
Registered electors		344,315		
Turnout			75.22	▼0.18
Democratic gain from LDP				

2005
Party	Candidate	Votes	%	±%
Liberal Democratic	Takehiko Endo (Incumbent)	142,342	54.84	
Democratic	Yōsuke Kondō (Incumbent-Tohoku PR block) (re-elected by Tohoku PR block)	117,211	45.16	
Registered electors		351,420		
Turnout			75.40	▲6.08
LDP hold				

2003
Party	Candidate	Votes	%	±%
Liberal Democratic	Takehiko Endo (Incumbent)	124,591	51.80	
Democratic	Yōsuke Kondō (elected by Tohoku PR block)	106,846	44.42	
Communist	Kenji Yokoyama	9,094	3.78	
Turnout			69.33	
LDP hold				

2000
Party	Candidate	Votes	%	±%
Liberal Democratic	Takehiko Endo (Incumbent)	93,819	51.26	
Independent	Yōsuke Kondō	77,491	42.34	
Communist	Toshio Ōta	11,718	6.40	
Turnout				
LDP hold				

1996
Party	Candidate	Votes	%	±%
Independent	Takehiko Endo	94,211	50.91	New
Liberal Democratic	Tetsuo Kondo	74,500	40.26	New
Communist	Koji Iwamoto	8,993	4.86	New
New Socialist	Tsuneyoshi Chiba	7,356	3.97	New
Turnout				

- Endo returned to the LDP after the election.
