= Kenta Wakabayashi =

Japanese politician

- 若林 健太
- Official portrait, 2026

Member of the House of Representatives
- Incumbent
- Assumed office 9 February 2026
- Preceded by: Takashi Shinohara
- Constituency: Nagano 1st
- In office 1 November 2021 – 9 October 2024
- Preceded by: Takashi Shinohara
- Succeeded by: Takashi Shinohara
- Constituency: Nagano 1st

Member of the House of Councillors
- In office 26 July 2010 – 25 July 2016
- Preceded by: Masatoshi Wakabayashi
- Succeeded by: Hideya Sugio
- Constituency: Nagano at-large

Personal details
- Born: 11 January 1964 (age 62) Nagano, Japan
- Party: Liberal Democratic
- Parent: Masatoshi Wakabayashi (father)
- Education: Keio University; Waseda University
- Website: Kenta Wakabayashi website

Kenta Wakabayashi (若林 健太, Wakabayashi Kenta; born 11 January 1964) is a Japanese politician of the Liberal Democratic Party, who serves as a member of the House of Representatives.

== Political career ==
In the 2010 House of Councillors election, Wakabayashi ran for Nagano at-large district (two-member district) as a successor of his father Masatoshi Wakabayashi, and was elected as the top, second elected member is DPJ Incumbent Toshimi Kitazawa, Incumbent Defense Minister.

In 2012, Wakabayashi was appointed to Parliamentary Vice-Minister for Foreign Affairs.

In the 2016 House of Councillors election, Seats of Nagano at-large district were reduced from two to one. Wakabayashi was defeated by former TV anchor Hideya Sugio (DP), who ran to succeed Kitazawa.

In the 2017 general election, Wakabayashi ran for Hokuriku Shinetsu PR block and could not win a seat.

In 2018, he was nominated as LDP’s Nagano 1st candidate in the next general election.

In the 2021 general election, Wakabayashi ran for Nagano 1st and defeated CDP Incumbent Takashi Shinohara to win his first election. Defeated Shinohara won a seat in the PR block.

In the 2024 LDP presidential election, Wakabayashi endorsed Sanae Takaichi as a recommender.

On October 6, 2024, PM Ishiba decided not to nominate members who were suspended from their membership in the general election, and announced that 43 lawmakers, including Wakabayashi, would not be allowed to run for proportional representation block because of the involvement in the slush fund scandal.

In the 2024 general election, Wakabayashi was defeated by Shinohara (CDP) and lost the election due to criticism of the slush fund scandal.

In the 2026 general election, Wakabayashi defeated CRA's Shinohara to regain his seat.

== Scandal ==
When the slush fund scandal was discovered at the end of December 2023, Wakabayashi said at a press conference on January 20, 2024 that he did not include 3.68 million yen in the political fund report.

On 14 May 2024, the House of Representatives Political Ethics Committee unanimously passed the opposition's petition to attend and explain 44 LDP members who were involved in the slush fund scandal but did not explain themselves to the committee. On 17 May 2024, the House of Councillors Political Ethics Committee unanimously passed a petition for attendance and explanation to 29 members who had not made excuses. All 73 Diet members, including Wakabayashi, refused to attend, and the ordinary Diet session was closed on 23 June 2024.
