= Tetsushi Sakamoto =

Japanese politician (born 1950)

- 坂本 哲志
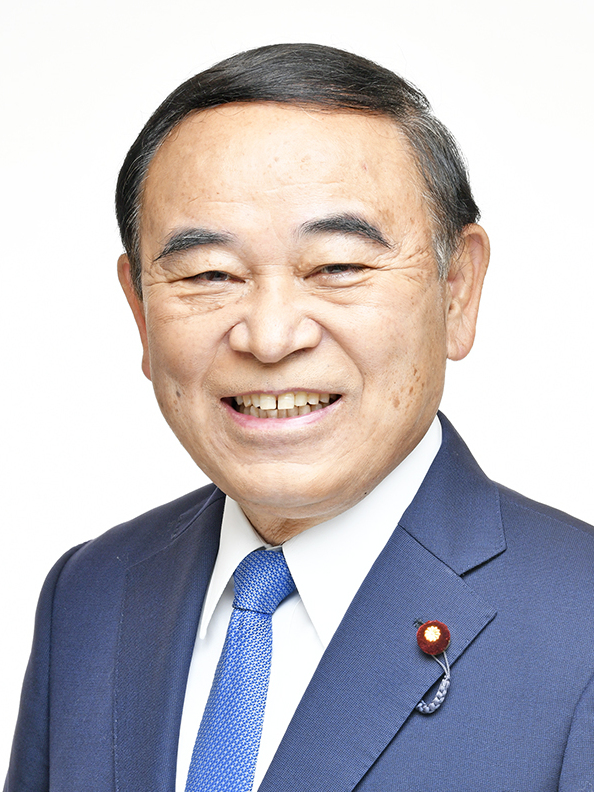
- Official portrait, 2022

Minister of Agriculture, Forestry and Fisheries
- In office 14 December 2023 – 1 October 2024
- Prime Minister: Fumio Kishida
- Preceded by: Ichiro Miyashita
- Succeeded by: Yasuhiro Ozato

Minister of Loneliness
- In office 12 February 2021 – 4 October 2021
- Prime Minister: Yoshihide Suga
- Preceded by: Office established
- Succeeded by: Seiko Noda

Member of the House of Representatives
- Incumbent
- Assumed office 30 July 2007
- Preceded by: Toshikatsu Matsuoka
- Constituency: Kumamoto 3rd
- In office 11 November 2003 – 8 August 2005
- Preceded by: Toshikatsu Matsuoka
- Succeeded by: Toshikatsu Matsuoka
- Constituency: Kumamoto 3rd

Member of the Kumamoto Prefectural Assembly
- In office 1991–2003
- Constituency: Kikuchi District

Personal details
- Born: 6 November 1950 (age 75) Kikuchi, Kumamoto, Japan
- Party: LDP (1991–1993; 1998–2003; 2007–present)
- Other political affiliations: NPS (1993–1998); Independent (2003–2007)
- Education: Chuo University

Tetsushi Sakamoto (坂本 哲志, Sakamoto Tetsushi; born 1950) is a Japanese politician who served as the minister of loneliness from 12 February 2021 to 4 October 2021 and as the Minister of Agriculture, Forestry and Fisheries from 14 December 2023 to 1 October 2024. He is also a member of the House of Representatives in the Diet (national legislature), representing the Liberal Democratic Party.

== Career ==
A native of Ōzu, Kumamoto and graduate of Chuo University, he had served in the assembly of Kumamoto Prefecture for four terms since 1991. He was elected to the House of Representatives for the first time in 2003.

His profile on the LDP website:

- Member, Kumamoto Prefectural Assembly
- Parliamentary Secretary for Internal Affairs and Communications (Fukuda and Aso Cabinet)
- Deputy Chairman, Diet Affairs Committee of LDP
- Acting Director, Public Management, Home Affairs, Posts and Telecommunications Division of LDP
- Chairman, Committee on Organizations Involved with Agriculture, Forestry and Fisheries of LDP
- Senior Vice Minister of Internal Affairs and Communications / Senior Vice Minister of Cabinet Office

Sakamoto is affiliated to the openly revisionist lobby Nippon Kaigi, a member of the related group at the Diet, as well as of the group related to Shintō Seiji Renmei at the Diet.

On 12 February 2021, Prime Minister Yoshihide Suga created a cabinet post to alleviate social isolation. Sakamoto was appointed to fill the post.

In February 2026, Sakamoto was made chairman of the Budget Committee in the House of Representatives. He was transferred to chairman of the Committee on Rules and Administration in October.

House of Representatives (Japan)
Preceded by Hiroshi Moriyama	Chairman of the Committee on Agriculture, Forestry and Fisheries; 2013–2014	Succeeded by Taku Eto
Preceded by Yukio Edano	Chairman of the Committee on the Budget; 2026	Succeeded by Ken Saitō
Preceded by Shunichi Yamaguchi	Chairman of the Committee on Rules and Administration; 2026–present	Incumbent
Political offices
Preceded by Seigo Kitamura	Minister of State for Regional Revitalisation; 2020–2021	Succeeded by Seiko Noda
Preceded by Seiichi Eto	Minister of State for Measures against Declining Birthrate; 2020–2021	Succeeded by Seiko Noda
Preceded by Ichiro Miyashita	Minister of Agriculture, Forestry and Fisheries; 2023–2024	Succeeded by Yasuhiro Ozato
Party political offices
Preceded by Yasukazu Hamada	Chairman of the Diet Affairs Committee, Liberal Democratic Party; 2024–2025	Succeeded by Hiroshi Kajiyama
