= Seiichi Ota =

Japanese politician (1945–2024)

- 太田 誠一
- Official portrait, 1998

Minister of Agriculture, Forestry and Fisheries
- In office 1 August 2008 – 19 September 2008
- Prime Minister: Yasuo Fukuda
- Preceded by: Masatoshi Wakabayashi
- Succeeded by: Nobutaka Machimura (acting); Shigeru Ishiba

Director-General of the Management and Coordination Agency
- In office 30 July 1998 – 5 October 1999
- Prime Minister: Keizō Obuchi
- Preceded by: Sadatoshi Ozato
- Succeeded by: Kunihiro Tsuzuki

Member of the House of Representatives
- In office 12 September 2005 – 21 July 2009
- Preceded by: Kazue Fujita
- Succeeded by: Kazue Fujita
- Constituency: Fukuoka 3rd
- In office 23 June 1980 – 10 October 2003
- Preceded by: Tadashi Kawano
- Succeeded by: Kazue Fujita
- Constituency: Fukuoka 1st (1980–1996); Fukuoka 3rd (1996–2003)

Personal details
- Born: 31 October 1945 Fukuoka, Japan
- Died: 4 December 2024 (aged 79) Tokyo, Japan
- Party: Liberal Democratic
- Other political affiliations: New Frontier (1994–1995)
- Relatives: Yukio Sakurauchi (grandfather); Yoshio Sakurauchi (uncle); Kiyoko Fukuda (cousin)
- Education: Fukuoka University

Seiichi Ota (太田 誠一, Ōta Seiichi; 31 October 1945 – 4 December 2024) was a Japanese politician who served as a member of the House of Representatives. He was a member of the Liberal Democratic Party (LDP) in the Koga faction. He was the cousin of Kiyoko Fukuda, who married Prime Minister of Japan Yasuo Fukuda.

== Life and career ==
Before entering politics, Ota was an economics professor. He then served as chief of the Management and Coordination Agency.

Ota entered politics in 1980 with the help of his father-in-law, the Governor of Fukuoka. He has since been involved mainly in economic policy. Under Noboru Takeshita in the late 1980s, he advocated the introduction of the consumption tax. Ota also participated in changes in the Commercial Law in the late 1990s and realignment of government ministries and agencies in 2001. Ota left the LDP in 1994 to form a small party, but returned to the LDP the following year.

== Controversies ==
Ota Igniting controversy after the Super Free rape scandal was revealed. On 26 June 2003 Ota said "At least gang rapists are still vigorous. Isn't that at least a little closer to normal?" This shocked Japan and Mizuho Fukushima criticized him.

During the debate on terrorism in January 2008, he claimed that Fukushima was an "ultra-leftist".

On 1 August 2008, Yasuo Fukuda named Ota as the Minister of Agriculture, Forestry and Fisheries in the cabinet list. However, he resigned the post on 19 September 2008, following a scandal over tainted rice (汚染米 or 事故米穀, Osenmai or Jikobeikoku). He stated: "I met with Prime Minister Fukuda and told him my decision to resign, considering the seriousness of the tainted rice problem for the society." Yasuo Fukuda accepted the resignation. Ota was informed of the problem in January 2007 but said he saw no need to make "too much of a fuss over it". The rice, tainted with pesticide methamidophos and mould, was for industrial uses only, but was resold, used and served to make lunches for thousands of schoolchildren and nursing home patients.

== Death ==
Ota died on 4 December 2024, at the age of 79.

Political offices
Preceded by Masatoshi Wakabayashi	Minister of Agriculture, Forestry and Fisheries of Japan; August 2, 2008 – September 19, 2008	Succeeded by Shigeru Ishiba
