= Norihiko Akagi =

Japanese politician

- 赤城 徳彦
- Official portrait, 2002

Minister of Agriculture, Forestry and Fisheries
- In office 1 June 2007 – 1 August 2007
- Prime Minister: Shinzo Abe
- Preceded by: Toshikatsu Matsuoka
- Succeeded by: Masatoshi Wakabayashi

Member of the House of Representatives
- In office 18 February 1990 – 21 July 2009
- Preceded by: Munenori Akagi
- Succeeded by: Nobuyuki Fukushima
- Constituency: Ibaraki 3rd (1990–1996); Ibaraki 1st (1996–2009)

Personal details
- Born: 18 April 1959 (age 67) Akeno, Ibaraki, Japan
- Party: Liberal Democratic
- Relatives: Munenori Akagi (grandfather)
- Education: University of Tokyo

Norihiko Akagi (赤城 徳彦, Akagi Norihiko; born 18 April 1959) is a Japanese former politician of the Liberal Democratic Party who served as a member of the House of Representatives in the Diet (national legislature).

A native of Makabe District, Ibaraki and graduate of the University of Tokyo, he worked at the Ministry of Agriculture, Forestry and Fisheries from 1983 to 1988. He was elected to the House of Representatives for the first time in 1990.

Akagi took office as Minister of Agriculture, Forestry and Fisheries after the suicide of his predecessor, Toshikatsu Matsuoka, in May 2007. Not even two months after being inaugurated, Akagi found himself indicted in a political funding scandal not entirely different from the one his predecessor had been embroiled in as he was alleged to have registered multi-million yen expenditures on an office which did not exist. Akagi was asked to make receipts official but refused. On 17 July he appeared at a press conference with two adhesive plasters on his face, puzzling reporters but still refusing to make receipts official.

Akagi resigned as Minister on 1 August 2007, after the upper house election. Minister of the Environment, Masatoshi Wakabayashi, became concurrent Minister of Agriculture, Forestry and Fisheries and stayed until 27 August 2007, when Shinzō Abe announced a new cabinet. Akagi's virtual successor was Takehiko Endo appointed on 27 August.

Political offices
Preceded by Toshikatsu Matsuoka	Minister of Agriculture, Forestry and Fisheries of Japan; 1 June 2007 – 1 August 2007	Succeeded by Masatoshi Wakabayashi
