= Super Free =

Japanese rave club

- スーパーフリー
- Formation: 1982
- Dissolved: 2003
- Type: Yugen kaisha
- Region served: Japan

Super Free (スーパーフリー, Sūpā-furī) or its shortened form Sūfuri (スーフリ) was an inter-university rave event club, mainly comprising students of Waseda University in Tokyo, Japan. The leader of the club along with various students from Waseda and other universities in Tokyo were arrested and convicted for rape and, subsequently, the club was dubbed by several English media outlets as a "rape club". Its leader was Shin'ichirō Wada (和田 真一郎, Wada Shin'ichirō; born July 30, 1974, in Kawasaki, Kanagawa Prefecture). Members of the group were convicted of raping three women, but the real number of victims is unknown. Since their arrests, and the club's dissolution, twelve other women have been identified as victims. The club was also incorporated as Super Free Yūgen gaisha (Limited) (有限会社スーパーフリー).

Super Free was established as a university social club in 1982. Wada was a student at Waseda University before being arrested. He entered Waseda University in 1994 and became the organizer of "Super Free" in 1995. It had 14 members as of 2003. Super Free was a highly successful inter-university rave event club, to the point that it was incorporated, having 5 branches nationwide, 30-odd employees and an office in Roppongi. According to the indictment, the club organized parties and social gatherings at a public night-club in Roppongi. The members of Super Free would scout for potential victims among the public, and befriend them offering drinks. Once their victims were intoxicated and incapable of resisting, they would lure them to an empty room. Wada was arrested on June 9, 2003. His circle's 13 other members were also arrested for gang rape. Super Free was dissolved on June 22, 2003.

Wada was indicted for three counts of rape. On November 2, 2004, the Tokyo District Court sentenced him to 14 years in prison, a comparatively heavy sentence under Japan's postwar sentencing guidelines. He appealed the verdict. On June 2, 2005, the Tokyo High Court rejected the appeal and upheld the original sentence. On November 1, 2005, the Supreme Court of Japan followed suit.

After their arrest, a statute for the prosecution of gang rape was established under the Criminal Code of Japan. In January 2006, three students in Kyoto University were arrested for gang rape under this penal code.

Seiichi Ota, a member of the House of Representatives, was heavily criticized after he issued a statement regarding the case, saying "At least gang rapists are still vigorous. Isn't that at least a little closer to normal?" on June 26, 2003. He later reported that his statement was taken out of context, and that he didn't have the chance to further comment on the topic.

Then Chief Cabinet Secretary Yasuo Fukuda was reported to have made highly controversial comments during an off-the-record discussion with reporters in June 2003 regarding the victims of rape by the members of Super Free, according to an article in the weekly magazine Shukan Bunshun. The magazine quoted Fukuda as saying: "There are women who look like they are saying 'Do it to me'. Those who have that kind of appearance are at fault, because men are black panthers." In response, Fukuda claimed that the Shūkan Bunshun had distorted his comments, stating that he had never intended to defend rape, and told a parliamentary panel afterwards that rape was "a criminal act and an atrocious crime".
