= Atsushi Koga (politician) =

Japanese politician (born 1972)

- 古賀 篤
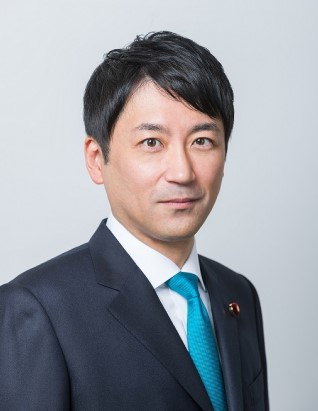
- Official portrait, 2021

Member of the House of Representatives
- Incumbent
- Assumed office 19 December 2012
- Preceded by: Kazue Fujita
- Constituency: Fukuoka 3rd

Personal details
- Born: 14 July 1972 (age 54) Fukuoka, Japan
- Party: Liberal Democratic
- Education: University of Tokyo

Atsushi Koga (古賀篤, Koga Atsushi; born 14 July 1972) is a Japanese politician serving as a member of the House of Representatives since 2012. From 2021 to 2022, he served as deputy minister of the Ministry of Health, Labour and Welfare. From 2021 to 2022, he served as chairman of the environment committee. From 2023 to 2024, he served as deputy minister of the Cabinet Office.
