= Nobuyuki Fukushima =

Japanese politician

- 福島 伸享
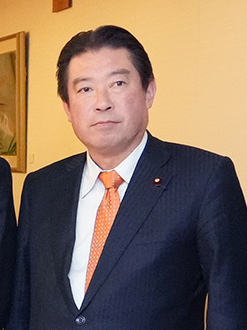

Member of the House of Representatives
- In office 1 November 2021 – 23 January 2026
- Preceded by: Yoshinori Tadokoro
- Succeeded by: Yoshinori Tadokoro
- Constituency: Ibaraki 1st
- In office 15 December 2014 – 28 September 2017
- Constituency: Northern Kanto PR
- In office 31 August 2009 – 16 November 2012
- Preceded by: Norihiko Akagi
- Succeeded by: Yoshinori Tadokoro
- Constituency: Ibaraki 1st

Personal details
- Born: 8 August 1970 (age 56) Hitachi, Ibaraki, Japan
- Party: Independent
- Other political affiliations: DPJ (2003–2016); DP (2016–2017); KnT (2017–2018); Yūshi no Kai (2021–2026)
- Education: University of Tokyo
- Website: Nobuyuki Fukushima website

Nobuyuki Fukushima (福島 伸享, Fukushima Nobuyuki; born 8 August 1970) is a Japanese politician, who served as a member of the House of Representatives.

== Early years ==
Fukushima was born in 1970 in Hitachi, Ibaraki Prefecture.

In 1995, Fukushima graduated from the University of Tokyo and joined the Ministry of International Trade and Industry (later integrated into the Ministry of Economy, Trade and Industry). He served until 2003.

== Political career ==
In the 2003 general election, DPJ nominated Fukushima as Ibaraki 1st candidate and he ran for Ibaraki 1st but lost to LDP Incumbent Norihiko Akagi.

In the 2005 general election, Fukushima lost to Akagi again.

In the 2009 general election, Fukushima defeated Akagi and gained Ibaraki 1st's seat.

In the 2011 DPJ leadership election, Fukushima endorsed Sumio Mabuchi as a recommender.

In 2012, Fukushima voted against the consumption tax increase bill submitted to the House of Representatives by Noda cabinet against DPJ's policy. However, he did not join People's Life First, a new party formed by Ichirō Ozawa and others who also voted against, and remained in DPJ. DPJ suspended Fukushima from party membership for two months.

In the 2012 general election, Fukushima lost to LDP's Yoshinori Tadokoro.

In the 2014 general election, Fukushima lost to Tadokoro but won a seat in Northhern Kanto PR block.

In March 2016, DPJ and Innovation Party merged into DP. Fukushima joined DP.

In the 2016 DP leadership election, Fukushima endorsed Yuichiro Tamaki as a recommender.

In 2017, Fukushima joined Kibō no Tō (KnT).

In the 2017 general election, Fukushima lost to Tadokoro.

In 2018, KnT and DP merged into DPP but Fukushima did not join DPP to be an independent.

In the 2021 general election, Fukushima defeated Tadokoro and Tadokoro won a seat in Northern Kanto PR block. After the election, with four other independent lawmakers who were all former DPJ politician, he founded the Yūshi no Kai, a parliamentary group.

In the 2024 general election, Fukushima defeated Tadokoro and Tadokoro won a seat in Northern Kanto PR block again.

In the 2026 general election, Fukushima was defeated by 2,867 votes.
