= Fukuoka 3rd district =

- Parliamentary constituency for the Japanese House of Representatives
- Numbered map of the Fukuoka Prefecture single seats
- Prefecture: Fukuoka
- Proportional District: Kyushu
- Electorate: 448,785

Current constituency
- Created: 1994
- Seats: One
- Party: LDP
- Representatives: Atsushi Koga
- Municipalities: Nishi-ku, Sawara-ku, and part of Jonan-ku of Fukuoka city. City of Itoshima.

Fukuoka 3rd district (福岡県第3区, Fukuoka-ken dai-sanku or simply 福岡3区, Fukuoka-sanku) is a single-member constituency of the House of Representatives in the national Diet of Japan located in Fukuoka Prefecture.

== Areas covered ==
=== Since 2017 ===
- Part of Fukuoka city
  - Nishi-ku
  - Sawara-ku
  - Part of Jonan-ku
- Itoshima

=== 2013 - 2017 ===
- Part of Fukuoka city
  - Nishi-ku
  - Sawara-ku
- Itoshima

=== 1994 - 2013 ===
- Part of Fukuoka city
  - Nishi-ku
  - Sawara-ku
- Maebaru
- Itoshima District

== List of representatives ==
Election	Representative	Party	Notes
1996	Seiichi Ota	LDP	
2000	Seiichi Ota	LDP	
2003	Kazue Fujita	Democratic	
2005	Seiichi Ota	LDP	
2009	Kazue Fujita	Democratic	
2012	Atsushi Koga	LDP	
2014	Atsushi Koga	LDP	
2017	Atsushi Koga	LDP	
2021	Atsushi Koga	LDP	
2024	Atsushi Koga	LDP	
2026	Atsushi Koga	LDP	

== Election results ==
=== 2026 ===
2026
Party	Candidate	Votes	%	±%
LDP	Atsushi Koga (Incumbent)	132,247	53.9	▲12.75
Centrist Reform	Genki Nieda	59,775	24.4	▼4.14
Ishin	Kō Amano	39,753	16.2	▲6.12
JCP	Hitomi Haraga	13,417	5.5	▲0.7
Majority		72,472	29.5	▲16.83
Registered electors		450,914		
Turnout		245,192	55.93	▲2.48
LDP hold				

=== 2024 ===
2024
Party	Candidate	Votes	%	±%
LDP	Atsushi Koga (Incumbent)	95,074	41.19	▼16.68
CDP	Genki Nieda	65,835	28.52	▼13.61
Ishin	Hidetoshi Seo	23,289	10.09	New
Reiwa	Fumiyo Okuda	22,661	9.82	New
Sanseitō	Yūko Shigematsu	12,887	5.58	New
JCP	Yūto Yamaguchi	11,059	4.80	N/A
Majority		29,239	12.67	
Registered electors		447,948		
Turnout			53.45	▼0.97
LDP hold				

=== 2021 ===
2021
Party	Candidate	Votes	%	±%
LDP	Atsushi Koga (Incumbent)	135,031	57.87	▼1.15
CDP	Koichi Yamauchi	98,304	42.13	New
Majority		36,727	15.74	
Registered electors		443,603		
Turnout			54.42	▼0.06
LDP hold				

=== 2017 ===
2017
Party	Candidate	Votes	%	±%
LDP	Atsushi Koga (Incumbent)	136,499	59.02	▲1.59
CDP	Koichi Yamauchi (Won PR seat)	94,772	40.98	New
Majority		41,727	18.04	
Registered electors		435,814		
Turnout			54.48	▲4.38
LDP hold				

=== 2014 ===
2014
Party	Candidate	Votes	%	±%
LDP	Atsushi Koga (Incumbent)	114,093	57.43	▲6.22
Democratic	Kazue Fujita	65,395	32.92	▲8.04
JCP	Yasuhiro Kawahara	19,164	9.65	▲3.98
Majority		48,698	24.51	
Registered electors		408,175		
Turnout			50.10	▼8.89
LDP hold				

=== 2012 ===
2012
Party	Candidate	Votes	%	±%
LDP	Atsushi Koga	118,299	51.21	▲11.07
Democratic	Kazue Fujita (Incumbent)	57,472	24.88	▼27.96
Your	Hiroyuki Terashima	42,126	18.24	New
JCP	Yasuhiro Kawahara	13,093	5.67	▲0.27
Majority		60,827	26.33	
Registered electors				
Turnout			58.99	
LDP gain from Democratic				

=== 2009 ===
2009
Party	Candidate	Votes	%	±%
Democratic	Kazue Fujita	142,489	52.84	▲12.23
LDP	Seiichi Ota (Incumbent)	108,236	40.14	▼13.93
JCP	Yasuhiro Kawahara	14,551	5.40	▲0.08
Happiness Realization	Yasuhiko Yoshitomi	4,364	1.62	New
Majority		34,253	12.70	
Registered electors				
Turnout				
Democratic gain from LDP				

=== 2005 ===
2005
Party	Candidate	Votes	%	±%
LDP	Seiichi Ota	139,428	54.07	▲8.83
Democratic	Kazue Fujita (Incumbent)	104,734	40.61	▼7.42
JCP	Tatsunobu Nakazono	13,723	5.32	▼1.41
Majority		34,694	13.46	
Registered electors				
Turnout				
LDP gain from Democratic				

=== 2003 ===
2003
Party	Candidate	Votes	%	±%
Democratic	Kazue Fujita	101,742	48.03	▲9.27
LDP	Seiichi Ota (Incumbent)	95,839	45.24	▼4.86
JCP	Tatsunobu Nakazono	14,257	6.73	▼2.24
Majority		5,903	2.79	
Registered electors				
Turnout				
Democratic gain from LDP				

=== 2000 ===
2000
Party	Candidate	Votes	%	±%
LDP	Seiichi Ota (Incumbent)	104,346	50.10	▲1.15
Democratic	Kazue Fujita	80,729	38.76	New
JCP	Atsuko Kumagai	18,691	8.97	▼2.82
Liberal League	Kazue Kubokawa	4,493	2.17	▼0.34
Majority		23,617	11.34	
Registered electors				
Turnout				
LDP hold				

=== 1996 ===
1996
Party	Candidate	Votes	%	±%
LDP	Seiichi Ota	88,953	48.95	New
New Frontier	Kinya Narasaki	66,788	36.75	New
JCP	Yūji Takada	21,421	11.79	New
Liberal League	Tadashi Yano	4,560	2.51	New
Majority		22,165	12.20	
Registered electors				
Turnout				
LDP win (new seat)				
