= Yoshinori Tadokoro =

Japanese politician

- 田所 嘉徳
- Official portrait, 2025

Member of the House of Representatives; from Northern Kanto
- Incumbent
- Assumed office 17 December 2012
- Preceded by: Nobuyuki Fukushima
- Constituency: Ibaraki 1st (2012–2021); PR block (2021–2026); Ibaraki 1st (2026–present)

Member of the Ibaraki Prefectural Assembly
- In office 1998–2012
- Constituency: Chikusei City

Member of the Shimodate City Council
- In office 1995–1998

Personal details
- Born: 19 January 1954 (age 72) Shimodate, Ibaraki, Japan
- Party: Liberal Democratic
- Education: Hakuoh University
- Website: Yoshinori Tadokoro website

Yoshinori Tadokoro (田所 嘉徳, Tadokoro Yoshinori; born 19 January 1954) is a Japanese politician of the Liberal Democratic Party, who serves as a member of the House of Representatives.

== Political career ==
In 1995, Tadokoro ran for the Shimodate city council and was elected for the first time.

In 1998, Tadokoro ran for the Ibaraki Prefectural Assembly and was elected for the first time. He was elected in the 2002 election, the 2006 election, and the 2010 election. Along with his political activities, he entered Hakuoh University and graduated.

In 2012, Tadokoro resigned as a member of the Ibaraki Prefectural Assembly for the general election. He ran for Ibaraki 1st district and defeated DPJ Incumbent Nobuyuki Fukushima.

In the 2014 general election, Tadokoro hold Ibaraki 1st’s seat. Defeated Fukushima won a seat in Northhern Kanto PR block.

In 2015, Tadokoro was appointed to Parliamentary Secretary for Justice in the Third Abe First reshuffled cabinet.

In the 2017 general election, Tadokoro defeated Kibō’s Fukushima and hold Ibaraki 1st’s seat.

In the 2018 LDP presidential election, Tadokoro endorsed Shigeru Ishiba as a recommender.

In 2020, Tadokoro was appointed to State Minister of Justice in the Suga cabinet.

In the 2021 general election, Tadokoro was defeated by Independent Fukushima. Tadokoro won a seat in Northe Kanto PR block.

In the 2024 LDP presidential election, Tadokoro endorsed Ishiba as a recommender again.

In the 2024 general election, Tadokoro lost to Fukushima again, but won a seat in Northern Kanto PR block.

In 2025, Tadokoro was appointed to State Minister for Reconstruction in the First Takaichi cabinet.

In the 2026 general election, Tadokoro defeated Fukushima by 2,867 votes and regain Ibaraki 1st’s seat. After the election, he was re-appointed to State Minister for Reconstruction in the Second Takaichi cabinet.
