= Ibaraki 1st district =

Japan House of Representatives constituency

Ibaraki 1st District
- Parliamentary constituency for the Japanese House of Representatives
- Numbered map of Ibaraki Prefecture single-member districts
- Prefecture: Ibaraki
- Proportional District: Kitakantō
- Electorate: 402,090 (2021)

Current constituency
- Created: 1994
- Number of members: One
- Party: LDP
- Representative: Yoshinori Tadokoro
- Created from: Ibaraki's 1st "medium-sized" district and 3rd "medium-sized" district
- Municipalities: Mito, Kasama, Chikusei, Sakuragawa and Shirosato Town

Ibaraki 1st district (茨城県第1区, Ibaraki-ken dai-ikku or simply 茨城1区, Ibaraki-ikku) is a single-member constituency of the House of Representatives in the national Diet of Japan. It is located in the central region of Ibaraki Prefecture, and covers the cities of Mito, Kasama, Chikusei and Sakuragawa as well as the town of Shirosato.

As of 2015, this district was home to 404,818 constituents.

== List of representatives ==
Election	Representative	Party	Notes
1996	Norihiko Akagi	LDP	
2000	Norihiko Akagi	LDP	
2003	Norihiko Akagi	LDP	
2005	Norihiko Akagi	LDP	
2009	Nobuyuki Fukushima	DPJ	
2012	Yoshinori Tadokoro	LDP	
2014	Yoshinori Tadokoro	LDP	
2017	Yoshinori Tadokoro	LDP	
2021	Nobuyuki Fukushima	Independent	
2024	Nobuyuki Fukushima	Independent	
2026	Yoshinori Tadokoro	LDP	

== Election results ==
=== 2026 ===
2026
Party	Candidate	Votes	%	±%
LDP	Yoshinori Tadokoro	87,570	41.6	▲4.8
Independent	Nobuyuki Fukushima	84,703	40.3	▼4.7
Sanseitō	Ayami Kawabata	25,327	12.0	
JCP	Kumiko Ouchi	12,842	6.1	▼0.9
Registered electors		414,908		
Turnout		210,442	51.92	▲0.64
LDP gain from Independent				

=== 2024 ===
2024
Party	Candidate	Votes	%	±%
Independent	Nobuyuki Fukushima	94,243	45.0	▼7.1
LDP	Yoshinori Tadokoro (Elected in N. Kanto PR block	76,960	36.8	▼11.2
Ishin	Yūki Mutō	23,619	11.3	
JCP	Sei'ichirō Takahashi	14,565	7.0	
Registered electors		418,446		
Turnout			51.28	▼0.01
Independent hold				

=== 2021 ===
2021
Party	Candidate	Age	Votes	%	±%	Loss ratio	Supports	Notes
Independent	Nobuyuki Fukushima	51	105,072	52.05%	▲12.28%	ー		
LDP	Yoshinori Tadokoro	67	96,791	47.95%	▼0.48%	92.12%	Kōmei	He was elected in PR.

=== 2017 ===
2017
Party	Candidate	Age	Votes	%	±%	Loss ratio	Supports	Notes
LDP	Yoshinori Tadokoro	63	100,875	48.43%	▼0.71%	ー	Kōmei	
Kibō	Nobuyuki Fukushima	47	82,835	39.77%	▲3.83%	82.12%		
JCP	Kumiko Ōuchi	68	22,034	10.58%	▼4.34%	21.84%		
HRP	Kenichi Kawabe	30	2,564	1.23%	ー	2.54%		

=== 2014 ===
2014
Party	Candidate	Age	Votes	%	±%	Loss ratio	Supports	Notes
LDP	Yoshinori Tadokoro	60	105,536	49.14%	▲3.80%	ー	Kōmei	
DPJ	Nobuyuki Fukushima	44	77,179	35.94%	▲6.98%	73.13%		He was elected in PR.
JCP	Kumiko Ōuchi	65	32,048	14.92%	ー	30.37%		

2012
Party	Candidate	Votes	%	±%
LDP	Yoshinori Tadokoro (endorsed by Kōmeitō)	103,463	45.34	
Democratic	Nobuyuki Fukushima (endorsed by PNP)	66,076	28.96	
Restoration	Yuki Ebisawa (endorsed by YP)	29,611	12.98	
Tomorrow	Yūko Mutō (endorsed by NPD)	15,971	7.00	
JCP	Takeo Taya	13,065	5.73	

2009
Party	Candidate	Votes	%	±%
Democratic	Nobuyuki Fukushima (endorsed by PNP)	151,165	57.1	
LDP	Norihiko Akagi (endorsed by Kōmeitō)	92,528	35.0	
JCP	Takeo Taya	15,776	6.0	
Happiness Realization	Kōji Kanazawa	5,267	2.0	

2005
Party	Candidate	Votes	%	±%
LDP	Norihiko Akagi (endorsed by Kōmeitō)	144,499	58.27	
Democratic	Nobuyuki Fukushima	86,999	35.08	
JCP	Takeo Taya	16,476	6.64	

2003
Party	Candidate	Votes	%	±%
LDP	Norihiko Akagi (endorsed by Kōmeitō, NCP)	128,349	58.71	
Democratic	Nobuyuki Fukushima (endorsed by SDP)	77,420	35.41	
JCP	Osamu Kojima	12,845	5.88	

2000
Party	Candidate	Votes	%	±%
LDP	Norihiko Akagi	132,229	58.99	
Democratic	Yumi Satō	53,148	23.71	
Social Democratic	Katsuichi Takasawa	18,573	8.29	
JCP	Takeo Taya	17,246	7.69	
Liberal League	Takao Gunji	2,968	1.32	

1996
Party	Candidate	Votes	%	±%
LDP	Norihiko Akagi	114,796	52.71	
New Frontier	Nobumitsu Tsukada	63,069	28.96	
Democratic	Yūji Tokizaki	24,730	11.36	
JCP	Hideko Sekito	15,185	6.97	
