= Kazue Fujita =

Japanese politician

- 藤田 一枝
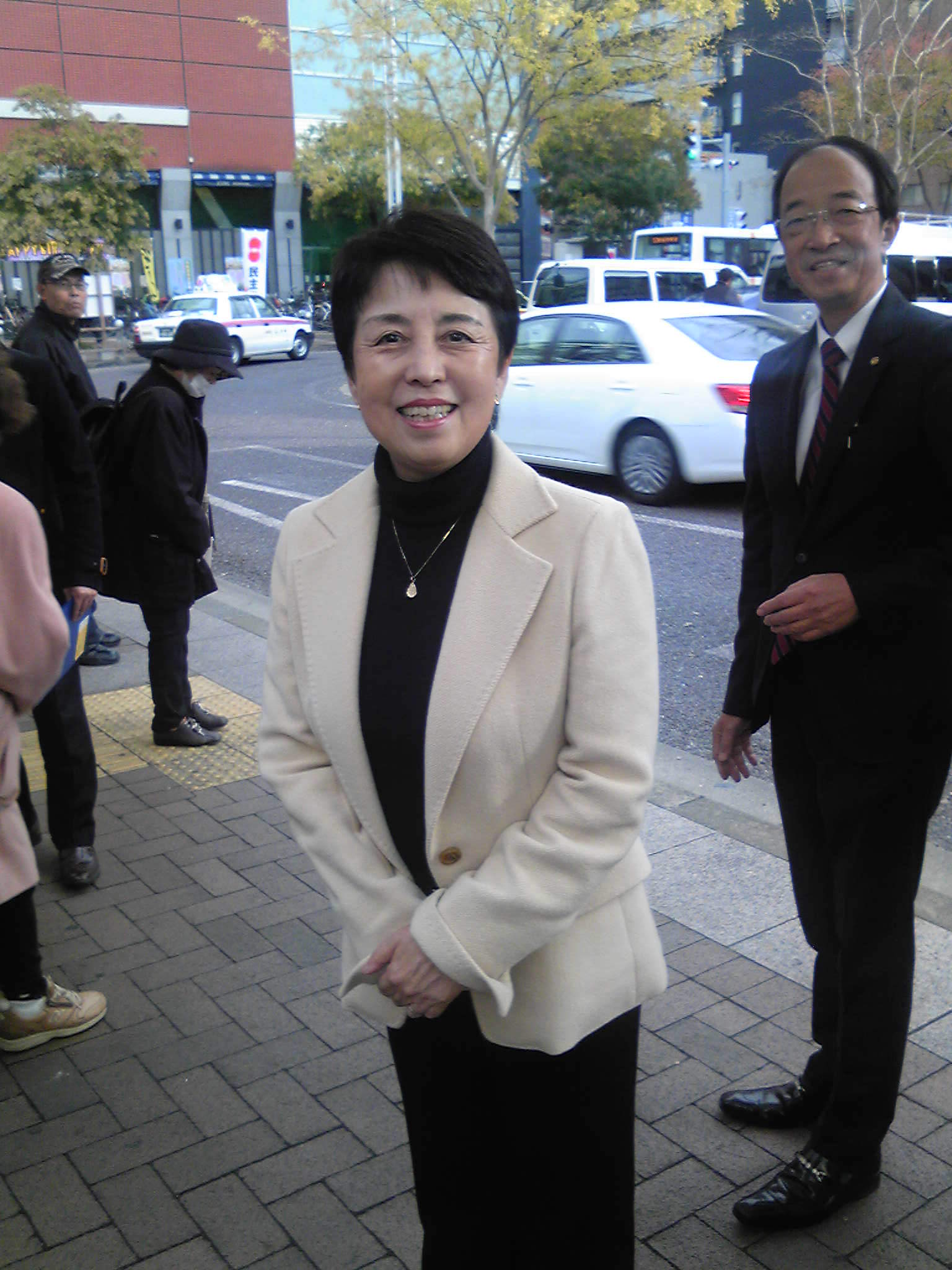
- Fujita in 2012

Member of the House of Representatives
- In office 30 August 2009 – 16 November 2012
- Preceded by: Seiichi Ota
- Succeeded by: Atsushi Koga
- Constituency: Fukuoka 3rd
- In office 10 November 2003 – 8 August 2005
- Preceded by: Seiichi Ota
- Succeeded by: Seiichi Ota
- Constituency: Fukuoka 3rd

Member of the Fukuoka Prefectural Assembly
- In office 1987–1998
- Constituency: Fukuoka City Sawara Ward

Personal details
- Born: 20 July 1949 (age 77) Tokyo, Japan
- Party: CDP (since 2017)
- Other political affiliations: JSP (1987–1996); Independent (1996–1998); DPJ (1998–2016); DP (2016–2017)
- Education: Meiji University

Kazue Fujita (藤田一枝, Fujita Kazue^{)} (born 20 July 1949) is a former Japanese politician who represented Fukuoka Prefecture in the House of Representatives for the Democratic Party of Japan. She was appointed to the Noda government in 2011 as Parliamentary Secretary for Health, Labour and Social Affairs.

== Life ==
Fujita studied at Meiji University.

In 1987, where she became an elected member of the Fukuoka Prefectural Assembly, representing the Sawara-ku district of Fukuoka City in that assembly. She was re-elected twice to this seat.

She resigned during her third term, to run for election to the House of Councillors of Japan for Fukuoka Prefecture, as an independent. She then ran in the 2000 Japanese general election in the third district of Fukuoka Prefecture, with the Democratic Party of Japan, but was defeated by Seiichi Ōta.

Fujita was elected for the first time in the 2003 Japanese general election, in the 3rd district of Fukuoka, defeating Seiichi Ōta. She joined several committees, including the one focused on issues related to Health, Labour and Social Affairs.

She did not retain her seat in the 2005 Japanese general election, but won the 2009 Japanese general election, allowing her to defeat Seiichi Ōta again. Fujita was then appointed head of the House of Representatives' Consumer and Health Affairs Committees in 2010. She was then appointed in the Noda government in 2011, to the position of Parliamentary Secretary for Health, Labour and Social Affairs.

She failed to be re-elected in 2012 and again in 2014. She also ran in the 2017 Japanese general election, this time under the nomination of the Constitutional Democratic Party, but without success.
