= Toshikatsu Matsuoka =

Japanese politician (1945-2007)

- 松岡 利勝
- Official portrait, 2001

Minister of Agriculture, Forestry and Fisheries
- In office 26 September 2006 – 28 May 2007
- Prime Minister: Shinzo Abe
- Preceded by: Shōichi Nakagawa
- Succeeded by: Masatoshi Wakabayashi (acting); Norihiko Akagi

Member of the House of Representatives
- In office 19 February 1990 – 28 May 2007
- Preceded by: Raizo Matsuno
- Succeeded by: Tetsushi Sakamoto
- Constituency: Kumamoto 1st (1990–1996); Kumamoto 3rd (1996–2003); Kyushu PR (2003–2005); Kumamoto 3rd (2005–2007)

Personal details
- Born: 25 February 1945 Aso, Kumamoto, Japan
- Died: 28 May 2007 (aged 62) Tokyo, Japan
- Party: Liberal Democratic
- Education: Tottori University
- Website: matsuokatoshikatsu.org (Archived 9 May 2007)

Toshikatsu Matsuoka (松岡 利勝, Matsuoka Toshikatsu; 25 February 1945 – 28 May 2007) was a Japanese politician who served as the Minister of Agriculture, Forestry and Fisheries from 2006 until his suicide in 2007 amid a financial scandal.

== Early life and education ==
He was born in Aso, Kumamoto, on the island of Kyūshū on 25 February 1945. His family were farmers. After graduating from high school in Kumamoto city, he joined Tottori University in Tottori Prefecture and studied agricultural science. He graduated in 1969.

== Political career ==
After graduation, Matsuoka joined the Ministry of Agriculture, Forestry and Fisheries. In 1990, he resigned as the spokesman of the Forestry Agency and ran for the then Kumamoto 1st district constituency in the parliamentary election. He won this election and later joined the Liberal Democratic Party (LDP). Matsuoka was a member of the political faction headed by Shizuka Kamei in LDP. Kamei was one of the fiercest opponents of the postal privatisation bills proposed by then prime minister Junichiro Koizumi, and Kamei and most of his faction defected from the LDP in 2005. Matsuoka stood with Koizumi, and after the general election he was appointed as a member of the special committee for the privatisation of the postal system.

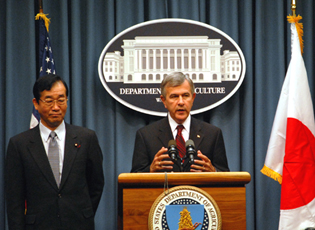
Matsuoka (left) with United States Secretary of Agriculture Mike Johanns in 2007

In 2006, then prime minister Shinzō Abe appointed Matsuoka as the Minister of Agriculture, Forestry and Fisheries. He worked on some political issues such as Free Trade Agreements with Australia and the beef import problem with the United States. Matsuoka received much attention when he announced a plan to make certifications for Japanese food restaurants outside Japan. He got this idea from the Denominazione di origine controllata system in Italy and hoped that this might distinguish pseudo-Japanese food restaurants from genuine ones. Many foreign media criticized this system as inappropriate, and named the system "sushi police." He retracted his plan and made a more moderate proposal.

Matsuoka was affiliated to the openly revisionist lobby Nippon Kaigi.

== Inquiry and death ==
Prior to his death, he faced questions over high utility expenses in a rent-free office – he had claimed more than 28 million yen ($236,600, £118,300). Matsuoka had previously apologized for failing to declare political donations.

He reported over 5 million yen ($48,000 USD) for utility expenses in 2005. This expense was questioned by the press, since Matsuoka had a very small office. However, Matsuoka said that it had paid for purified water, explaining that people rarely drink tap water. On 28 May 2007, hours before facing questioning in the Diet (parliament), he hanged himself in his Tokyo apartment and died at Keio University Hospital in Tokyo. Norihiko Akagi was appointed his successor on 1 June but served for only two months.

The former governor of Tokyo, Shintaro Ishihara, described him as a "true samurai" for preserving his honour. Ishihara was also the scriptwriter for the film I Go To Die For You, which glorifies the memory and bravery of the kamikaze pilots in World War II.

Matsuoka's Vice Minister, Taku Yamamoto, said on 20 June that Matsuoka had used the money on Asakusa geisha, Japanese press reported, but Yamamoto retracted his comments the next day, saying it was only a joke.
