= Takehiko Endo =

Japanese politician (1938–2019)

- 遠藤 武彦
- Official portrait, 2001

Minister of Agriculture, Forestry and Fisheries
- In office 27 August 2007 – 3 September 2007
- Prime Minister: Shinzo Abe
- Preceded by: Masatoshi Wakabayashi
- Succeeded by: Akira Amari

Member of the House of Representatives
- In office 21 October 1996 – 21 July 2009
- Preceded by: Constituency established
- Succeeded by: Yōsuke Kondō
- Constituency: Yamagata 2nd
- In office 7 July 1986 – 18 June 1993
- Preceded by: Saburō Watanabe
- Succeeded by: Toshiaki Endo
- Constituency: Yamagata 1st

Member of the Yamagata Prefectural Assembly
- In office 1975–1986

Personal details
- Born: 5 October 1938 Yonezawa, Yamagata, Japan
- Died: 27 December 2019 (aged 81) Yonezawa, Yamagata, Japan
- Party: Liberal Democratic
- Education: Chuo University

Takehiko Endo (遠藤 武彦, Endō Takehiko; 5 October 1938 – 27 December 2019) was a Japanese politician who was a member of Liberal Democratic Party, serving in the House of Representatives in the Diet of Japan.

== Early life ==
Endo was a native of Yonezawa, Yamagata and graduated from Chuo University in Tokyo.

== Political career ==
Endo was elected to the first of his three terms in the assembly of Yamagata Prefecture in 1975 and then to the House of Representatives for the first time in 1986. He lost his seat in 1993 but was re-elected three years later.

=== Financial scandal ===
On 3 September 2007, due to a financial scandal, he resigned as Minister of Agriculture just eight days after he was appointed to the post. Masatoshi Wakabayashi became new Minister of Agriculture, Forestry and Fisheries again.

== Death ==
On 27 December 2019, Endo died in a hospital in Yamagata Prefecture from interstitial pneumonia.

Political offices
Preceded by Masatoshi Wakabayashi	Minister of Agriculture, Forestry and Fisheries of Japan; 27 August 2007 – 3 September 2007	Succeeded by Masatoshi Wakabayashi
