= Takashi Shinohara =

Japanese politician (born 1948)

- 篠原 孝
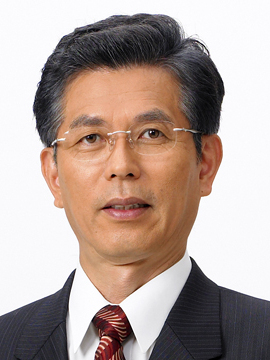
- Official portrait, 2011

Member of the House of Representatives; from Hokuriku-Shin'etsu
- In office 9 November 2003 – 23 January 2026
- Preceded by: Multi-member district
- Succeeded by: Kenta Wakabayashi
- Constituency: PR block (2003–2009); Nagano 1st (2009–2021); PR block (2021–2024); Nagano 1st (2024–2026)

Personal details
- Born: 17 July 1948 (age 78) Nakano, Nagano, Japan
- Party: CRA (since 2026)
- Other political affiliations: DPJ (2003–2016); DP (2016–2018); DPP (2018–2020); CDP (2020–2026)
- Education: Kyoto University
- Website: しのはら孝blog

Takashi Shinohara (篠原 孝, Shinohara Takashi; born 17 July 1948) is a Japanese politician who served as a member of the House of Representatives in the Diet (national legislature).

== Early life ==
Shinohara is a native of Nakano, Nagano and graduated from Kyoto University. After graduation he joined the Ministry of Agriculture, Forestry and Fisheries. While in the ministry, he received a L.L.M degree from University of Washington and attended the Kansas State University in the United States.

== Political career ==
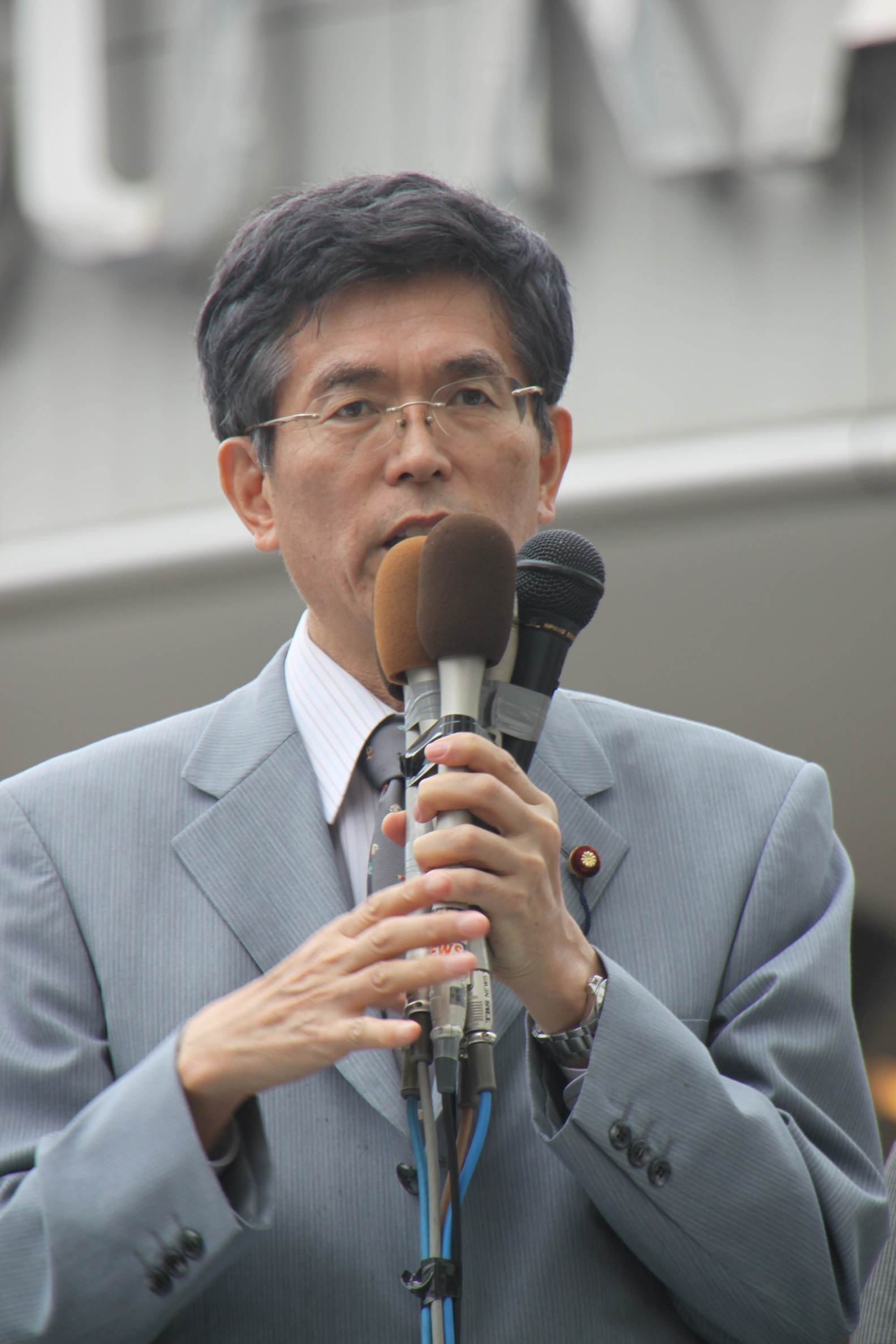
Takashi Shinohara (in Chiyoda, Tokyo on 5 November 2011)

Leaving the ministry, Shinohara was elected to the House of Representatives for the first time in 2003.
