= Yasuhiro Ozato =

Japanese politician

- 小里 泰弘
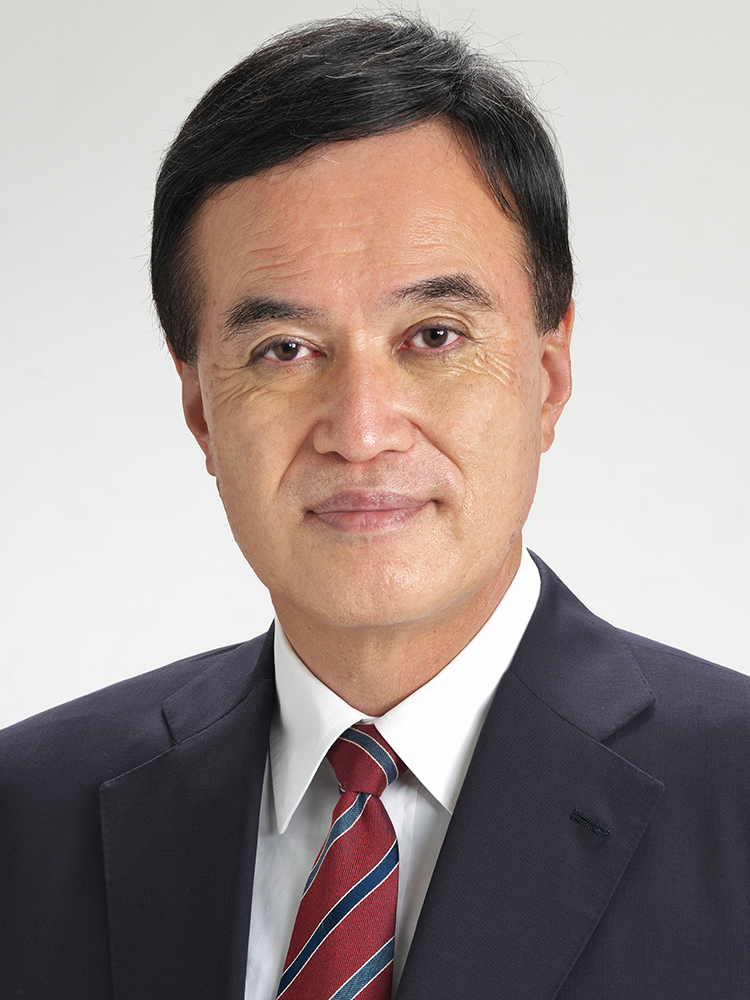
- Official portrait, 2021

Minister of Agriculture, Forestry and Fisheries
- In office 1 October 2024 – 11 November 2024
- Prime Minister: Shigeru Ishiba
- Preceded by: Ichiro Miyashita
- Succeeded by: Taku Etō

Member of the House of Representatives
- Incumbent
- Assumed office 9 February 2026
- Preceded by: Multi-member district
- Constituency: Kyushu PR
- In office 11 September 2005 – 9 October 2024
- Preceded by: Sadatoshi Ozato
- Succeeded by: Multi-member district
- Constituency: Kagoshima 4th (2005–2017); Kagoshima 3rd (2017–2021); Kyushu PR (2021–2024)

Personal details
- Born: 29 September 1958 (age 68) Aira, Kagoshima, Japan
- Party: Liberal Democratic
- Relatives: Sadatoshi Ozato (father)
- Education: Keio University

Yasuhiro Ozato (小里 泰弘, Ozato Yasuhiro; born 29 September 1958) is a Japanese politician of the Liberal Democratic Party and a former member of the House of Representatives in the Diet. A native of the former town of Kirishima, Kagoshima and graduate of Keio University, he was elected for the first time in 2005. He is affiliated to the revisionist lobby Nippon Kaigi.

== Career ==
- Company Employee
- 5 times elected to the House of Representatives (constituency: Kagoshima 3)
- State Minister of Cabinet Office
- State Minister of Environment
- Parliamentary Vice-Minister, Agriculture, Forestry and Fisheries
- Chief Director, Committee on Agriculture, Forestry and Fisheries, HR
- Director, Agriculture and Forestry Division, LDP
- Deputy Secretary-General, LDP
