= Ryosuke Takeda =

Japanese politician

- 武田 良介

Member of the House of Councillors
- In office 26 July 2016 – 25 July 2022
- Constituency: National PR

Personal details
- Born: 13 August 1979 (age 47) Nakano, Nagano, Japan
- Party: Communist
- Education: Shinshu University

Ryosuke Takeda (Japanese: 武田 良介, Hepburn: Takeda Ryosuke; born 13 August 1979, Nagano Prefecture) is a member of the Japanese House of Councillors and of the Japanese Communist Party. He was elected to his position in the National Diet in 2016. He supports the restoration of animals, plants, and their habitats.
