= Shusei Tanaka =

Japanese politician

- 田中 秀征

Director-General of the Economic Planning Agency
- In office 11 January 1996 – 7 November 1996
- Prime Minister: Ryutaro Hashimoto
- Preceded by: Isamu Miyazaki
- Succeeded by: Tarō Asō

Member of the House of Representatives
- In office 19 February 1990 – 27 September 1996
- Preceded by: Masatoshi Wakabayashi
- Succeeded by: Constituency abolished
- Constituency: Nagano 1st
- In office 19 December 1983 – 2 June 1986
- Preceded by: Zentarō Kosaka
- Succeeded by: Zentarō Kosaka
- Constituency: Nagano 1st

Personal details
- Born: 30 September 1940 (age 86) Sarashina, Nagano, Japan
- Party: Liberal Democratic
- Other political affiliations: NPS (1993–1998)
- Education: University of Tokyo; Hokkaido University

Shūsei Tanaka (田中秀征, Tanaka Shũsei; born 30 September 1940) is a retired Japanese politician. He was first elected to the House of Representatives in the 1972 general election and represented the Nagano Prefecture first district. Following a revamp of the electoral system, he lost his seat to Kenji Kosaka in the 1996 general election.

== Biography ==
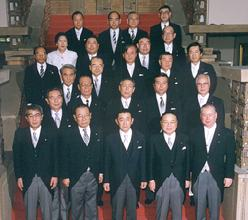
Tanaka with members of First Hashimoto Cabinet (at the Prime Minister's Official Residence on January 11, 1996)

Tanaka was born in present-day Nagano City. Originally a member of the Liberal Democratic Party, he co-founded New Party Sakigake in 1993 and served as a senior advisor to Prime Minister Morihiro Hosokawa from 1993 to 1994. He later returned to the LDP and served as Director-General of the Economic Planning Agency under Prime Minister Ryutaro Hashimoto. Tanaka again served as a policy advisor to Hosokawa during his bid for Governor of Tokyo in the 2014 gubernatorial election.
