= Kagoshima Prefectural Assembly =

Prefectural assembly of Kagoshima

The Kagoshima Prefectural Assembly (鹿児島県議会, Kagoshima-ken Gikai) is the prefectural parliament of Kagoshima Prefecture.

== Members ==
As of 31 October 2019

Constituency	Members	Party
Kagoshima City and District	Hidemi Anraku	Kenmin Rengō
Kagoshima City and District	Takeshi Fujisaki	LDP
Kagoshima City and District	Nobusuke Fukushiyama	Kenmin Rengō
Kagoshima City and District	Yoshiharu Hōrai	LDP
Kagoshima City and District	Satoko Iwashige	Unaffiliated
Kagoshima City and District	Tsutomu Kuwadzuru	LDP
Kagoshima City and District	Hirotaka Matsuda	Komeito Kagoshima Kengidan
Kagoshima City and District	Akio Mori	Komeito Kagoshima Kengidan
Kagoshima City and District	Nobuharu Naruo	Komeito Kagoshima Kengidan
Kagoshima City and District	Yasuhide Osada	LDP
Kagoshima City and District	Kiyonobu Ōzono	LDP
Kagoshima City and District	Teppei Shibatate	LDP
Kagoshima City and District	Takao Shimodzuru	Unaffiliated
Kagoshima City and District	Yukio Taira	JCP Kengidan
Kagoshima City and District	Yōichi Terada	LDP
Kagoshima City and District	Sadashige Ueyama	Kenmin Rengō
Kagoshima City and District	Seiko Yanagi	Kenmin Rengō
Kanoya City and Tarumizu City	Takuo Gōhara	LDP
Kanoya City and Tarumizu City	Yoshihira Horinouchi	LDP
Kanoya City and Tarumizu City	Yoshiharu Maeno	Kenmin Rengō
Kanoya City and Tarumizu City	Hirofumi Ōkubo	LDP
Makurazaki City	Kyō Nishimura	LDP
Akune City and Izumi District	Motoko Nakamura	LDP
Izumi City	Kōki Itō	LDP
Izumi City	Kōtarō Obata	LDP
Ibusuki City	Shigeyoshi Kozono	LDP
Nishinoomote City and Kumage District	Shigeru Hidaka	LDP
Nishinoomote City and Kumage District	Yasuhiro Matsuzato	LDP
Satsumasendai City	Katsuzō Hokazono	LDP
Satsumasendai City	Ryōji Tanaka	LDP
Satsumasendai City	Haruhiko Tōjima	Kenmin Rengō
Hioki City	Kiyotake Higashi	Unaffiliated
Hioki City	Yasushi Maehara	LDP
Soo City	Saburō Setoguchi	LDP
Kirishima City and Aira District	Masato Nakamura	LDP
Kirishima City and Aira District	Kōzō Tanoue	LDP
Kirishima City and Aira District	Akito Tsurumaru	LDP
Kirishima City and Aira District	Kuniharu Yamada	LDP
Ichikikushikino City	Atsuhiro Yoshidome	LDP
Minamisatsuma City	Yutaka Shonoda	LDP
Shibushi City and Soo District	Satoru Nishitaka	LDP
Amami City	Toshio Mukai	LDP
Amami City	Akiyoshi Nagai	LDP
Minamikyūshū City	Kōichirō Tabata	LDP
Isa City	Ken’ichi Ikehata	LDP
Aira City	Takurō Sakō	LDP
Aira City	Makiko Yonemaru	LDP
Satsuma District	Makoto Shiraishi	LDP
Kimotsuki District	Shirō Tsuruta	LDP
Ōshima District	Shin’ichirō Kiku	LDP
Ōshima District	Hajime Kotobuki	LDP
