= Tetsuo Kondo =

Japanese politician

- 近藤 鉄雄
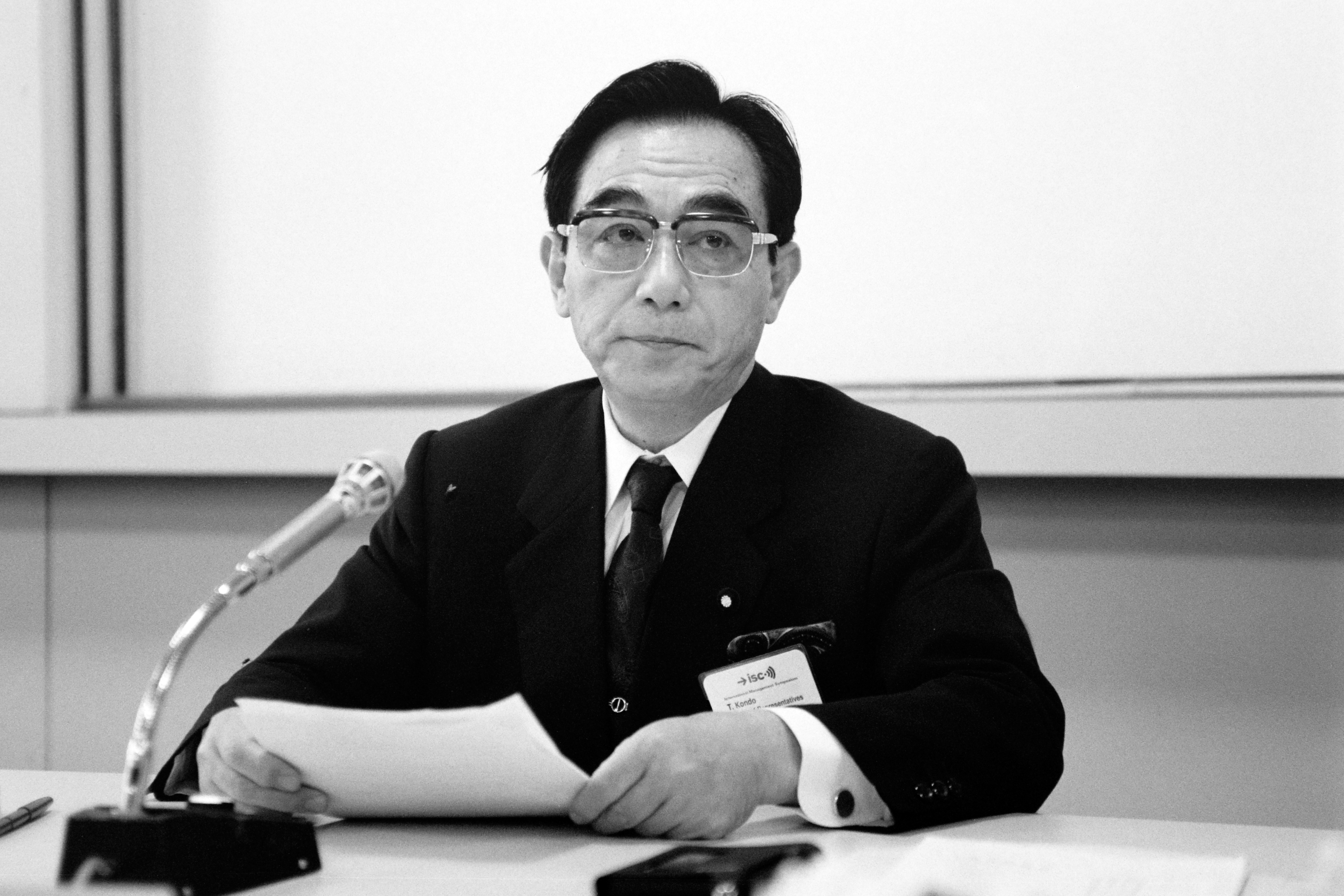

Minister of Labour
- In office 5 November 1991 – 12 December 1992
- Prime Minister: Kiichi Miyazawa
- Preceded by: Sadatoshi Ozato
- Succeeded by: Masakuni Murakami

Director-General of the Economic Planning Agency
- In office 22 July 1986 – 6 November 1987
- Prime Minister: Yasuhiro Nakasone
- Preceded by: Wataru Hiraimizu
- Succeeded by: Eiichi Nakao

Member of the House of Representatives
- In office 23 September 1972 – 27 September 1996
- Preceded by: Masataka Hotta
- Succeeded by: Constituency abolished
- Constituency: Yamagata 1st

Personal details
- Born: 11 August 1929 Nan'yō, Yamagata, Japan
- Died: 4 March 2010 (aged 80) Tokyo, Japan
- Party: Liberal Democratic
- Children: Yōsuke Kondō
- Relatives: Masakatsu Nohara (father-in-law)
- Education: Hitotsubashi University; University of California, Berkeley

Tetsuo Kondo (近藤 鉄雄, Kondō Tetsuo; 11 August 1929 – 4 March 2010) was a Japanese politician who served as Japan's Minister of Labour from 1991 until 1992.

Kondo, who was from Yamagata Prefecture, began his career as an employee of the Japanese Ministry of Finance. Kondo, a member of the Liberal Democratic Party, served as a member of the House of Representatives of Japan for nine terms from 1972 until 1996. He also served as chief of the now defunct Economic Planning Agency during his career as a lawmaker.

Kondo was appointed as Labour Minister within the administration of Prime Minister Kiichi Miyazawa from 1991 until 1992. He retired from active politics after a failed re-election bid in the 1996 general election.

Tetsuo Kondo died in Tokyo of pancreatic cancer on 4 March 2010, at the age of 80.

Political offices
Preceded by Wataru Hiraimizu	Head of the Economic Planning Agency; 1986–1987	Succeeded by Eiichi Nakao
Preceded by Sadatoshi Ozato	Minister of Labour; 1991–1992	Succeeded by Masakuni Murakami
House of Representatives (Japan)
Preceded by Kokai Nakamura	Chair, Science and Technology Committee of the House of Representatives of Japan; 1981–1982	Succeeded by Yoshihide Mori
