= Masatoshi Wakabayashi =

Japanese politician (1934–2023)

- 若林 正俊
- Official portrait, 2001

Minister of Agriculture, Forestry and Fisheries
- In office 4 September 2007 – 2 August 2008
- Prime Minister: Shinzo Abe; Yasuo Fukuda
- Preceded by: Akira Amari (acting); Takehiko Endo
- Succeeded by: Seiichi Ota
- In office 1 August 2007 – 27 August 2007
- Prime Minister: Shinzo Abe
- Preceded by: Norihiko Akagi
- Succeeded by: Takehiko Endo
- Acting; 28 May 2007 – 1 June 2007
- Prime Minister: Shinzo Abe
- Preceded by: Toshikatsu Matsuoka
- Succeeded by: Norihiko Akagi

Minister of the Environment
- In office 26 September 2006 – 27 August 2007
- Prime Minister: Shinzo Abe
- Preceded by: Yuriko Koike
- Succeeded by: Ichirō Kamoshita

Member of the House of Councillors
- In office 26 July 1998 – 2 April 2010
- Preceded by: Kiyoshi Imai
- Succeeded by: Kenta Wakabayashi
- Constituency: Nagano at-large

Member of the House of Representatives
- In office 19 July 1993 – 27 September 1996
- Preceded by: Isamu Shimizu
- Succeeded by: Constituency abolished
- Constituency: Nagano 1st
- In office 19 December 1983 – 24 January 1990
- Preceded by: Tadao Kuraishi
- Succeeded by: Shusei Tanaka
- Constituency: Nagano 1st

Personal details
- Born: 4 July 1934 Sarashina, Nagano, Japan
- Died: 11 November 2023 (aged 89) Tokyo, Japan
- Party: Liberal Democratic
- Children: Kenta Wakabayashi
- Education: University of Tokyo

Masatoshi Wakabayashi (若林 正俊, Wakabayashi Masatoshi; 4 July 1934 – 11 November 2023) was a Japanese politician who was a member of Liberal Democratic Party.

== Political career ==
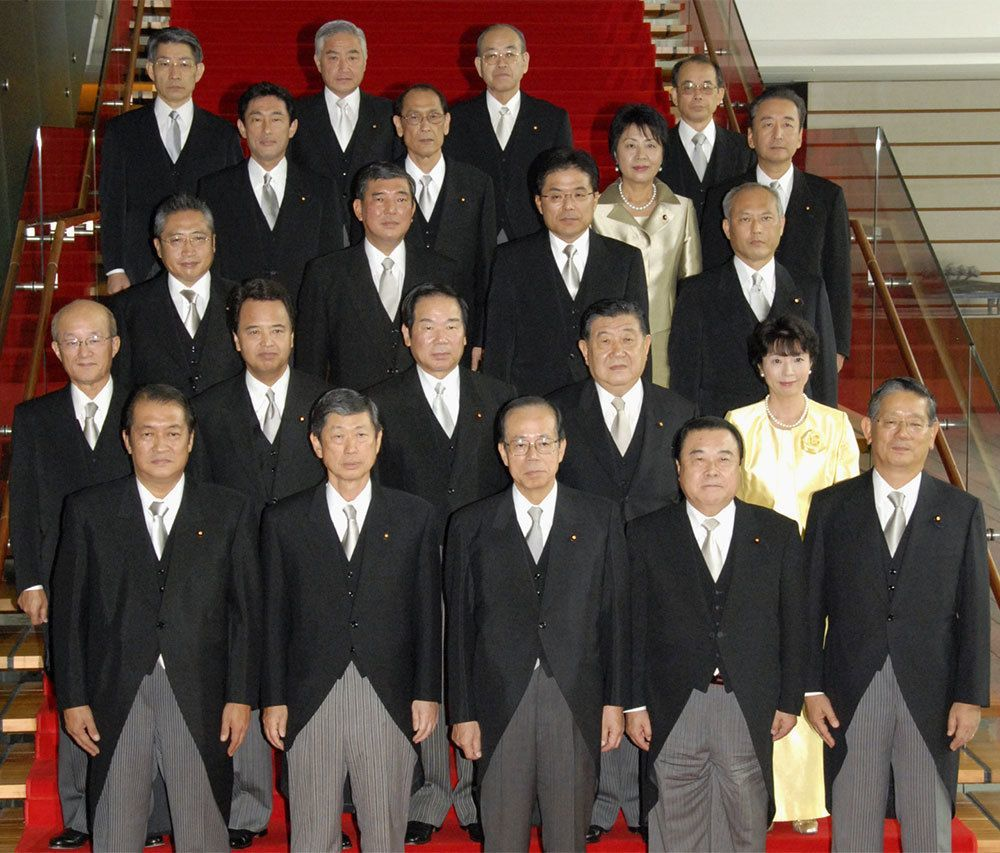
Wakabayashi with members of the Yasuo Fukuda Cabinet (26 September 2007)

Wakabayashi became the third Minister of Agriculture, Forestry and Fisheries appointed in Shinzō Abe's first cabinet after Toshikatsu Matsuoka killed himself as a result of financial scandal and Matsuoka's successor Norihiko Akagi resigned due to other financial scandals. He was appointed to the same position again in Abe's first reshuffled cabinet after Takehiko Endo's resignation.

After Abe's resignation, he worked under Yasuo Fukuda, who appointed Seiichi Ota his successor.

After the LDP were defeated in the 2009 election, it was unclear who would be their candidate in the diet nomination for prime minister, since Taro Aso had already announced his resignation as party president and no successor had been chosen. The party ultimately decided to nominate Wakabayashi, who was then chairman of the general assembly of LDP diet members, for Prime Minister, though he had no hope of being elected.

== Resignation and death ==
In March 2010 he resigned from the Diet after being accused of pressing the voting button for fellow lawmaker Mikio Aoki, whose Diet seat was next to him, while Aoki was absent from a house plenary vote.

Wakabayashi died in Tokyo on 11 November 2023, at the age of 89.

== Honours ==
- Japan:
  - Grand Cordon of the Order of the Rising Sun (July 2011)

Political offices
Preceded by Takehiko Endo	Minister of Agriculture, Forestry and Fisheries of Japan; 2007–2008	Succeeded by Seiichi Ota
Preceded by Norihiko Akagi	Minister of Agriculture, Forestry and Fisheries of Japan; 2007	Succeeded by Takehiko Endo
Preceded by Yuriko Koike	Minister of the Environment of Japan; 2006–2007	Succeeded by Ichirō Kamoshita
