= Yōsuke Kondō =

Japanese politician

- 近藤 洋介
- Official portrait, 2012

Mayor of Yonezawa
- Incumbent
- Assumed office 22 December 2023
- Preceded by: Masaru Nakagawa

Member of the House of Representatives
- In office 9 November 2003 – 28 September 2017
- Constituency: Tohoku PR (2003–2009); Yamagata 2nd (2009–2012); Tohoku PR (2012–2017)

Personal details
- Born: 19 May 1965 (age 61) Washington, D.C., U.S.
- Party: Independent (since 2018)
- Other political affiliations: DPJ (2000–2016); DP (2016–2017); KnT (2017–2018)
- Parent: Tetsuo Kondo (father)
- Education: Keio University
- Website: 近藤洋介オフィシャルウェブサイト

Yōsuke Kondō (近藤 洋介, Kondō Yōsuke; born 19 May 1965) is a Japanese politician of the Democratic Party of Japan, a member of the House of Representatives in the Diet (national legislature). Kondō, the son of former Minister of Labour Tetsuo Kondo, was born in Washington, D.C., but grew up in Yamagata Prefecture. A graduate of Keio University, he joined the national newspaper Nihon Keizai Shimbun in 1988, which he left in 1999. He was elected for the first time in 2003 after an unsuccessful run in 2000.

On 15 December 2022, he announced that he would run for the mayorship of Yonezawa. He was elected to a four-year term of office beginning 22 December 2023.

Political offices
Preceded by Masaaki Taniai, Yoshifumi Matsumura	Parliamentary Secretary for Economy, Trade and Industry; 2009–2010; Served alongside: Chiaki Takahashi	Succeeded by Kaname Tajima, Yoshikatsu Nakayama
Preceded by Mitsuyoshi Yanagisawa, Seishu Makino	Senior Vice Minister of Economy, Trade and Industry; 2012; Served alongside: Isao Matsumiya	Succeeded by Kazuyoshi Akaba, Isshu Sugawara
