= Minister of Agriculture, Forestry and Fisheries (Japan) =

Japanese cabinet role

- Emblem of the Government of Japan

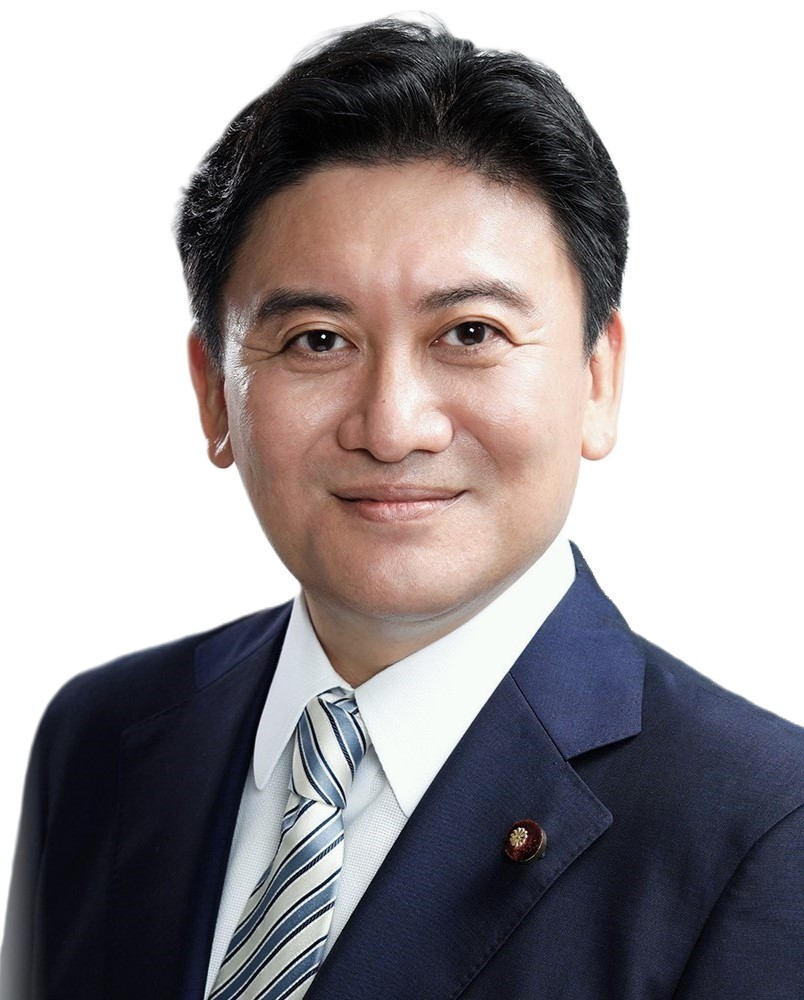
- Incumbent; Arata Takebe since 15 October 2026
- Ministry of Agriculture, Forestry and Fisheries
- Style: His Excellency
- Member of: Cabinet of Japan
- Reports to: Prime Minister of Japan
- Nominator: Prime Minister of Japan
- Appointer: Emperor of Japan; attested to by the Emperor
- Precursor: Minister of Education; Director-General of the Science and Technology Agency
- Formation: July 5, 1978; 48 years ago
- Deputy: State Minister of Agriculture
- Salary: ¥20,916,000

The Minister of Agriculture, Forestry and Fisheries (農林水産大臣, Nourin-Suisan Daijin) is a member of the Cabinet of Japan and is the leader and chief executive of the Ministry of Agriculture, Forestry and Fisheries. The minister is nominated by the Prime Minister of Japan and is appointed by the Emperor of Japan.

The current minister is Arata Takebe, who took office on 15 October 2026.

== List of ministers of agriculture, forestry and fisheries ==
Liberal Democratic
Japan New Party
Japan Renewal Party
Socialist
Democratic

| Minister | | | Term of office | | | Prime minister |
| # | Portrait | Name | Took office | Left office | Days | Prime minister |
|---|---|---|---|---|---|---|
| 1 | | Ichiro Nakagawa | July 5, 1978 | December 7, 1978 | 155 | Takeo Fukuda |
| 2 | | Michio Watanabe | December 7, 1978 | November 9, 1979 | 337 | Masayoshi Ōhira |
| 3 | | Kabun Mutō | November 9, 1979 | July 17, 1980 | 251 | Masayoshi Ōhira |
| 4 | | Takao Kameoka | July 17, 1980 | November 30, 1981 | 501 | Zenkō Suzuki |
| 5 | | Kichirō Tazawa | November 30, 1981 | November 27, 1982 | 362 | Zenkō Suzuki |
| 6 | | Iwazo Kaneko | November 27, 1982 | December 27, 1983 | 395 | Yasuhiro Nakasone |
| 7 | | Shinjiro Yamamura | December 27, 1983 | November 1, 1984 | 310 | Yasuhiro Nakasone |
| 8 | | Moriyoshi Sato | November 1, 1984 | December 28, 1985 | 422 | Yasuhiro Nakasone |
| 9 | | Tsutomu Hata | December 28, 1985 | July 22, 1986 | 206 | Yasuhiro Nakasone |
| 10 | | Mutsuki Kato | July 22, 1986 | November 6, 1987 | 472 | Yasuhiro Nakasone |
| 11 | | Takashi Sato | November 6, 1987 | December 27, 1988 | 417 | Noboru Takeshita |
| 12 (9) | | Tsutomu Hata | December 27, 1988 | June 3, 1989 | 158 | Noboru Takeshita |
| 13 | | Hisao Horinouchi | June 3, 1989 | August 10, 1989 | 68 | Sōsuke Uno |
| 14 | | Michihiko Kano | August 10, 1989 | February 28, 1990 | 202 | Toshiki Kaifu |
| 15 | | Tomio Yamamoto | February 28, 1990 | December 29, 1990 | 304 | Toshiki Kaifu |
| 16 | | Motoji Kondō | December 29, 1990 | November 5, 1991 | 311 | Toshiki Kaifu |
| 17 | | Masami Tanabu | November 5, 1991 | August 4, 1993 | 638 | Kiichi Miyazawa |
| 18 | | Kiichi Miyazawa | August 4, 1993 | August 9, 1993 | 5 | Kiichi Miyazawa |
| 19 | | Eijiro Hata | August 9, 1993 | April 28, 1994 | 262 | Morihiro Hosokawa |
| ー (9) | | Tsutomu Hata (Acting) | April 28, 1994 | April 28, 1994 | 0 | Tsutomu Hata |
| 20 (10) | | Mutsuki Kato | April 28, 1994 | June 30, 1994 | 63 | Tsutomu Hata |
| 21 | | Taichiro Ōkawara | June 30, 1994 | August 8, 1995 | 404 | Tomiichi Murayama |
| 22 | | Hosei Norota | August 8, 1995 | January 11, 1996 | 156 | Tomiichi Murayama |
| 23 | | Ichizo Ōhara | January 11, 1996 | November 7, 1996 | 301 | Ryutaro Hashimoto |
| 24 | | Takao Fujimoto | November 7, 1996 | September 11, 1997 | 308 | Ryutaro Hashimoto |
| 25 | | Ihei Ochi | September 11, 1997 | September 26, 1997 | 15 | Ryutaro Hashimoto |
| 26 | | Yoshinobu Shimamura | September 26, 1997 | July 30, 1998 | 307 | Ryutaro Hashimoto |
| 27 | | Shōichi Nakagawa | July 30, 1998 | October 5, 1999 | 432 | Keizō Obuchi |
| 28 | | Tokuichiro Tamazawa | October 5, 1999 | July 4, 2000 | 273 | Keizō Obuchi |
| 28 | | Tokuichiro Tamazawa | October 5, 1999 | July 4, 2000 | 273 | Yoshirō Mori |
| 29 | | Yoichi Tani | July 4, 2000 | December 5, 2000 | 154 | Yoshirō Mori |
| 30 | | Yoshio Yatsu | December 5, 2000 | April 26, 2001 | 142 | Yoshirō Mori |
| 31 | | Tsutomu Takebe | April 26, 2001 | September 30, 2002 | 522 | Junichiro Koizumi |
| 32 | | Tadamori Ōshima | September 30, 2002 | April 1, 2003 | 183 | Junichiro Koizumi |
| 33 | | Yoshiyuki Kamei | April 1, 2003 | September 27, 2004 | 545 | Junichiro Koizumi |
| 34 (26) | | Yoshinobu Shimamura | September 27, 2004 | August 8, 2005 | 315 | Junichiro Koizumi |
| 35 | | Junichiro Koizumi | August 8, 2005 | August 11, 2005 | 3 | Junichiro Koizumi |
| 36 | | Mineichi Iwanaga | August 11, 2005 | October 31, 2005 | 81 | Junichiro Koizumi |
| 37 (27) | | Shōichi Nakagawa | October 31, 2005 | September 26, 2006 | 330 | Junichiro Koizumi |
| 38 | | Toshikatsu Matsuoka | September 26, 2006 | May 28, 2007 | 244 | Shinzo Abe |
| ー | | Masatoshi Wakabayashi (Acting) | May 28, 2007 | June 1, 2007 | 4 | Shinzo Abe |
| 39 | | Norihiko Akagi | June 1, 2007 | August 1, 2007 | 61 | Shinzo Abe |
| 40 | | Masatoshi Wakabayashi | August 1, 2007 | August 27, 2007 | 26 | Shinzo Abe |
| 41 | | Takehiko Endo | August 27, 2007 | September 3, 2007 | 7 | Shinzo Abe |
| ー | | Akira Amari (Acting) | September 3, 2007 | September 4, 2007 | 1 | Shinzo Abe |
| 42 (40) | | Masatoshi Wakabayashi | September 4, 2007 | August 2, 2008 | 333 | Shinzo Abe |
| 42 (40) | | Masatoshi Wakabayashi | September 4, 2007 | August 2, 2008 | 333 | Yasuo Fukuda |
| 43 | | Seiichi Ōta | August 2, 2008 | September 19, 2008 | 48 | Yasuo Fukuda |
| ー | | Nobutaka Machimura (Acting) | September 19, 2008 | September 26, 2008 | 7 | Yasuo Fukuda |
| 44 | | Shigeru Ishiba | September 26, 2008 | September 16, 2009 | 355 | Tarō Asō |
| 45 | | Hirotaka Akamatsu | September 16, 2009 | June 8, 2010 | 265 | Yukio Hatoyama |
| 46 | | Masahiko Yamada | June 8, 2010 | September 17, 2010 | 101 | Naoto Kan |
| 47 (14) | | Michihiko Kano | September 17, 2010 | June 4, 2012 | 626 | Naoto Kan |
| 47 (14) | | Michihiko Kano | September 17, 2010 | June 4, 2012 | 626 | Yoshihiko Noda |
| 48 | | Akira Gunji | June 4, 2012 | December 16, 2012 | 205 | Yoshihiko Noda |
| 49 | | Yoshimasa Hayashi | December 16, 2012 | September 3, 2014 | 616 | Shinzo Abe |
| 50 | | Koya Nishikawa | September 3, 2014 | February 23, 2015 | 173 | Shinzo Abe |
| 51 | | Yoshimasa Hayashi | February 23, 2015 | October 7, 2015 | 226 | Shinzo Abe |
| 52 | | Hiroshi Moriyama | October 7, 2015 | August 3, 2016 | 301 | Shinzo Abe |
| 53 | | Yūji Yamamoto | August 3, 2016 | August 3, 2017 | 365 | Shinzo Abe |
| 54 | | Ken Saitō | August 3, 2017 | October 2, 2018 | 425 | Shinzo Abe |
| 55 | | Takamori Yoshikawa | October 2, 2018 | September 11, 2019 | 344 | Shinzo Abe |
| 56 | | Taku Etō | September 11, 2019 | September 16, 2020 | 371 | Shinzo Abe |
| 57 | | Kōtarō Nogami | September 16, 2020 | October 4, 2021 | 383 | Yoshihide Suga |
| 58 | | Genjirō Kaneko | October 4, 2021 | August 10, 2022 | 310 | Fumio Kishida |
| 59 | | Tetsuro Nomura | August 10, 2022 | September 13, 2023 | 399 | Fumio Kishida |
| 60 | | Ichiro Miyashita | September 13, 2023 | December 14, 2023 | 92 | Fumio Kishida |
| 61 | | Tetsushi Sakamoto | December 14, 2023 | October 1, 2024 | 292 | Fumio Kishida |
| 62 | | Yasuhiro Ozato | October 1, 2024 | November 11, 2024 | 41 | Shigeru Ishiba |
| 63 (56) | | Taku Etō | November 11, 2024 | May 21, 2025 | 190 | Shigeru Ishiba |
| 64 | | Shinjirō Koizumi | May 21, 2025 | October 21, 2025 | 153 | Shigeru Ishiba |
| 65 | | Norikazu Suzuki | October 21, 2025 | September 17, 2026 | 331 | Sanae Takaichi |
| 66 | | Kazuo Yana | September 17, 2026 | October 15, 2026 | 28 | Sanae Takaichi |
| 67 | | Arata Takebe | October 15, 2026 | Incumbent | 0 | Sanae Takaichi |
