= Results of the 2014 Japanese general election (Shikoku proportional representation block) =

The Shikoku proportional representation block was one of 11 multi-member districts (and 306 districts overall) that were contested at the general election for the House of Representatives in the Japanese National Diet on 14 December 2014. Six seats were available for election via open party lists. Prime Minister Shinzo Abe's Liberal Democratic Party (LDP) maintained their dominance in the predominantly rural area, claiming three of the seats.

Voters who participated in the election cast one ballot for the proportional block and a separate ballot for one of the 11 smaller single-member districts that are located within Shikoku. The number of single-member districts within Shikoku was reduced from the 13 districts that were contested at the previous election in 2012.

== Results ==
Following on from the LDP landslide win at the 2012 general election, in which the party won 12 of the 13 electorates in Shikoku plus two of the six seats from the PR list, the LDP maintained their dominant position in the region by retaining all 10 of their electorates (two electorates were abolished to address voter malapportionment) and gaining a seat on the PR list from the dissolved Japan Restoration Party (JRP).

The JRP, which won 2 seats with 21.3% of the vote at the 2012 general election, had split in May 2014, with former members subsequently forming the Japan Innovation Party and Party for Future Generations. Of the two JRP members previously elected from the Shikoku PR list, Fumiki Sakurauchi joined the Party for Future Generations and contested the PR block in 2014, while Arata Nishioka contested the Ehime 2nd district as an independent; both candidates lost.

Former Ehime Prefectural Assembly member Hiroyuki Yokoyama the Japan Innovation Party's unsuccessful candidate in Ehime 2nd district, gained a seat for the new party, while the Democratic Party of Japan (DPJ) and Komeito representatives were able to retain their seats.

Elected candidates
Party	Representative	Party rank	Term #
LDP	Teru Fukui	1	6th
DPJ	Junya Ogawa	1	4th
LDP	Mamoru Fukuyama	2	2nd
Komeito	Noritoshi Ishida	1	7th
Innovation	Hiroyuki Yokoyama	1	1st
LDP	Takakazu Seto	3	2nd

Party	Votes	%	+/–	Seats	+/–
Liberal Democratic Party	547,185	34.85	+4.19	3	+1
Democratic Party of Japan	326,803	20.82	+4.77	1	0
Komeito	247,776	15.78	+0.81	1	0
Japan Innovation Party	200,882	12.79	New	1	New
Japanese Communist Party	158,848	10.12	+4.34	0	0
Party for Future Generations	44,515	2.84	New	0	New
Social Democratic Party	33,257	2.12	–0.19	0	0
Happiness Realization Party	10,762	0.69	+0.25	0	0
Total	1,570,028	100.00	–	6	0
Valid votes	1,570,028	96.92			
Invalid/blank votes	49,834	3.08			
Total votes	1,619,862	100.00			
Registered voters/turnout	3,259,284	49.70			
Source: Ministry of Internal Affairs and Communications

== Party lists ==
=== Liberal Democratic Party ===
	Liberal Democratic Party		Number of votes: 547,185		Percentage of votes: 34.9%	Number of seats won: 3
Rank	Name	Incumbency	District contested	Loss ratio (Sekihairitsu)	Result	Notes
1	Teru Fukui	Kochi 1st district		—N/a	✓ Elected to block	
2	Mamoru Fukuyama	Tokushima 1st district		—N/a	✓ Elected to block	
3	Takakazu Seto	Shikoku proportional representation block	Kagawa 2nd district	72.7	✓ Elected to block	
3	Masazumi Gotoda	Tokushima 3rd district	Tokushima 1st district	—N/a	✓ Won Tokushima 1st district	
3	Shunichi Yamaguchi	Tokushima 2nd district	Tokushima 2nd district	—N/a	✓ Won Tokushima 2nd district	
3	Takuya Hirai	Kagawa 1st district	Kagawa 1st district	—N/a	✓ Won Kagawa 1st district	
3	Keitaro Ono	Kagawa 3rd district	Kagawa 3rd district	—N/a	✓ Won Kagawa 3rd district	
3	Yasuhisa Shiozaki	Ehime 1st district	Ehime 1st district	—N/a	✓ Won Ehime 1st district	
3	Seiichiro Murakami	Ehime 2nd district	Ehime 2nd district	—N/a	✓ Won Ehime 2nd district	
3	Toru Shiraishi	Ehime 3rd district	Ehime 3rd district	—N/a	✓ Won Ehime 3rd district	
3	Koichi Yamamoto	Ehime 4th district	Ehime 4th district	—N/a	✓ Won Ehime 4th district	
3	Gen Nakatani	Kochi 2nd district	Kochi 1st district	—N/a	✓ Won Kochi 1st district	
3	Yuji Yamamoto	Kochi 3rd district	Kochi 2nd district	—N/a	✓ Won Kochi 2nd district	
14	Ichiro Nagai					
15	Masae Izumi					
16	Mitsuru Yuasa					

=== Democratic Party of Japan ===
	Democratic Party of Japan		Number of votes: 326,803		Percentage of votes: 20.8%	Number of seats won: 1
Rank	Name	Incumbency	District contested	Loss ratio (Sekihairitsu)	Result	Notes
1	Junya Ogawa	Shikoku proportional representation block	Kagawa 1st district	88.7	✓ Elected to block	
1	Yoichi Shiraishi	(Former member)	Ehime 3rd district	81.0		
1	Hirobumi Niki	(Former member)	Tokushima 1st district	75.0		
1	Takako Nagae	(Former member)	Ehime 1st district	74.5		
1	Norio Takeuchi		Kochi 2nd district	50.8		Former House of Councillors member
1	Shu Oishi		Kochi 1st district	48.8		
1	Yuichiro Tamaki	Kagawa 2nd district	Kagawa 2nd district	—N/a	✓ Won Kagawa 2nd district	
8	Hajime Tsuzugi					

=== Komeito ===
	Komeito		Number of votes: 247,776		Percentage of votes: 15.8%	Number of seats won: 1
Rank	Name	Incumbency	District contested	Loss ratio (Sekihairitsu)	Result	Notes
1	Noritoshi Ishida	Shikoku proportional representation block			✓ Elected to block	
2	Hideo Nakano					

=== Japan Innovation Party ===
	Japan Innovation Party		Number of votes: 200,882		Percentage of votes: 12.8%	Number of seats won: 1
Rank	Name	Incumbency	District contested	Loss ratio (Sekihairitsu)	Result	Notes
1	Hiroyuki Yokoyama		Ehime 2nd district	39.6	✓ Elected to block	
1	Natsue Mori		Ehime 4th district	30.2		
3	Yoshinori Kita					

=== Japanese Communist Party ===
	Japanese Communist Party		Number of votes: 158,848		Percentage of votes: 10.1%	Number of seats won: 0
Rank	Name	Incumbency	District contested	Loss ratio (Sekihairitsu)	Result	Notes
1	Yuriko Hamaka					
2	Naoaki Haruna	(Former member)	Kochi 1st district			

=== Party for Future Generations ===
	Party for Future Generations		Number of votes: 44,515		Percentage of votes: 2.8%	Number of seats won: 0
Rank	Name	Incumbency	District contested	Loss ratio (Sekihairitsu)	Result	Notes
1	Fumiki Sakurauchi	Shikoku proportional representation block	Ehime 4th district		✗ Lost seat	Elected as a Japan Restoration Party candidate in 2012
2	Mitsuya Sugiyama					

=== Social Democratic Party ===
	Social Democratic Party		Number of votes: 33,257		Percentage of votes: 2.1%	Number of seats won: 0
Rank	Name	Incumbency	District contested	Loss ratio (Sekihairitsu)	Result	Notes
1	Yoshinori Takata		Kagawa 3rd district			

=== Happiness Realization Party ===
	Happiness Realization Party		Number of votes: 10,762		Percentage of votes: 0.7%	Number of seats won: 0
Rank	Name	Incumbency	District contested	Loss ratio (Sekihairitsu)	Result	Notes
1	Yuka Komatsu					
2	Koji Morita					
