= Results of the 2014 Japanese general election =

- 14 December 2014
- All 475 seats in the House of Representatives; 238 seats needed for a majority
Party	Leader	Seats	+/–
LDP	Shinzō Abe	291	−3
Democratic	Banri Kaieda	73	+16
Ishin	Kenji Eda	41	−13
Komeito	Natsuo Yamaguchi	35	+4
JCP	Kazuo Shii	21	+13
Future Generations	Takeo Hiranuma	2	New
People's Life	Ichirō Ozawa	2	−7
Social Democratic	Tadatomo Yoshida	2	0
Independents	–	8	+3
This lists parties that won seats. See the complete results below.
- Constituency seats
- All 295 seats
- Turnout: 52.65% (▼6.67pp)
Party	Vote %	Seats	+/–
LDP	48.10	223	−14
Democratic	22.51	38	+11
JCP	13.30	1	+1
Ishin	8.16	11	−3
Future Generations	1.79	2	New
Komeito	1.45	9	0
Social Democratic	0.79	1	0
People's Life	0.97	2	0
Independents	2.85	8	+3
This lists parties that won seats. See the complete results below.
- Proportional seats
- All 180 seats
- Turnout: 52.65% (▼6.66pp)
Party	Vote %	Seats	+/–
LDP	33.11	68	+11
Democratic	18.33	35	+5
Ishin	15.72	30	−10
Komeito	13.71	26	+4
JCP	11.37	20	+12
Social Democratic	2.46	1	0
This lists parties that won seats. See the complete results below.
Results by constituency and PR seats, shaded according to vote strength
Prime Minister before	Prime Minister after
Shinzō Abe; LDP	Shinzō Abe; LDP

This article presents detailed results of the 2014 Japanese general election. The results are separated into each of the eleven proportional representation blocks and their corresponding prefectures. In the following tables, candidates elected via single-member district are highlighted in green, while candidates elected via proportional representation are highlighted in red.

== Electoral system ==
The House of Representatives is elected via parallel voting. In the 2014 election, 295 members were elected in single-member districts and 180 via party-list proportional representation in eleven multi-member constituencies, referred to as "PR blocks". Single-member districts are apportioned between prefectures and numbered (1st, 2nd, etc). Candidates may run solely in a single-member district, solely in PR, or both (dual listing). Dual listed candidates must win at least 10% of the vote in their single-member district in order to be eligible for election via PR. Dual listed candidates who win their single-member district race are not eligible for election via PR.

Candidates on PR lists may be ranked sequentially or, if they are dual listed, ranked equally with one another. If ranked equally, the best-loser ratio (sekihairitsu) of each candidate determines the order of election. This number is determined by dividing their single-member district votes by those of the winning candidate in that district. In this way, the losing candidates who performed best will be elected first.

If a party wins more PR seats than they have eligible candidates on their list, the unfilled seats will be distributed to other parties in accordance with the PR formula.

== Hokkaidō block ==
2014 Japanese general election in Hokkaido
- 14 December 2014

All 20 seats to the House of Representatives
	Majority party	Minority party	Third party
Party	LDP	DPJ	Komeito
Last election	14 seats	2 seats	2 seats
Constituency	8	3	1
PR seats	3	2	1
Total	11	5	2
Seat change	▼3	▲3	0
	Fourth party	Fifth party	Sixth party
Party	JCP	JIP	Daichi
Last election	0 seats	1 seat	1 seat
Constituency	0	0	0
PR seats	1	1	0
Total	1	1	0
Seat change	▲1	0	▼1

Single-member constituency results in Hokkaido
Constituency	Previous member		Elected member		Votes	%	Margin	Runner-up	Party	%	Status
Hokkaido 1st	Toshimitsu Funabashi	LDP	Takahiro Yokomichi	DPJ	116,398	43.5	10,480	Toshimitsu Funabashi	LDP	39.6	DPJ gain from LDP
Hokkaido 2nd	Takamori Yoshikawa	LDP	Takamori Yoshikawa	LDP	88,667	38.8	32,292	Kenko Matsuki	JIP	24.7	LDP hold
Hokkaido 3rd	Hirohisa Takagi	LDP	Hirohisa Takagi	LDP	92,649	39.5	7,058	Satoshi Arai	DPJ	36.5	LDP hold
Hokkaido 4th	Hiroyuki Nakamura	LDP	Hiroyuki Nakamura	LDP	77,690	45.4	7,641	Yoshio Hachiro	DPJ	40.9	LDP hold
Hokkaido 5th	Nobutaka Machimura	LDP	Nobutaka Machimura	LDP	131,394	50.9	36,419	Kenji Katsube	DPJ	36.8	LDP hold
Hokkaido 6th	Hiroshi Imazu	LDP	Takahiro Sasaki	DPJ	104,595	45.3	2,847	Hiroshi Imazu	LDP	44.0	DPJ gain from LDP
Hokkaido 7th	Yoshitaka Itō	LDP	Yoshitaka Itō	LDP	72,281	45.9	225	Takako Suzuki	DPJ	45.7	LDP hold
Hokkaido 8th	Kazuo Maeda	LDP	Seiji Osaka	DPJ	97,745	47.3	6,394	Kazuo Maeda	LDP	44.2	DPJ gain from LDP
Hokkaido 9th	Manabu Horii	LDP	Manabu Horii	LDP	97,805	45.7	11,553	Tatsumaru Yamaoka	DPJ	40.3	LDP hold
Hokkaido 10th	Hisashi Inatsu	Komei	Hisashi Inatsu	Komei	86,722	48.5	15,503	Hiroshi Kamiya	DPJ	39.8	Komei hold
Hokkaido 11th	Yūko Nakagawa	LDP	Yūko Nakagawa	LDP	87,118	52.2	25,713	Takeo Mitsu	DPJ	36.8	LDP hold
Hokkaido 12th	Arata Takebe	LDP	Arata Takebe	LDP	92,357	53.4	30,322	Mika Mizukami	DPJ	35.9	LDP hold

Proportional representation results
Party	Votes	Seats	Rank	Elected member	Constituency	Ratio
LDP	744,748 (29.8%)	3	1	Kōichi Watanabe		
LDP	744,748 (29.8%)	3	2	Hiroshi Imazu	Hokkaido 6th	92.3%
LDP	744,748 (29.8%)	3	2	Kazuo Maeda	Hokkaido 8th	93.5%
DPJ	688,922 (28.6%)	2	1	Takako Suzuki	Hokkaido 7th	99.7%
DPJ	688,922 (28.6%)	2	1	Satoshi Arai	Hokkaido 3rd	92.4%
Komei	307,534 (12.3%)	1	1	Hidemichi Satō		
JCP	302,251 (12.1%)	1	1	Kazuya Hatayama		
JIP	247,342 (9.9%)	1	1	Kenko Matsuki	Hokkaido 2nd	63.6%

== Tohoku block ==
2014 Japanese general election in Tohoku
- 14 December 2014

All 39 seats to the House of Representatives
	Majority party	Minority party	Third party
Party	LDP	DPJ	JIP
Last election	24 seats	7 seats	2 seats
Constituency	19	4	1
PR seats	5	4	2
Total	24	8	3
Seat change	0	▲1	▲1
	Fourth party	Fifth party	Sixth party
Party	Komeito	JCP	PLP
Last election	1 seat	1 seat	2 seats
Constituency	0	0	1
PR seats	2	1	0
Total	2	1	1
Seat change	▲1	0	▼1

Single-member constituency results in Tohoku
Constituency	Previous member		Elected member		Votes	%	Margin	Runner-up	Party	%	Status
Aomori 1st	Jun Tsushima	LDP	Jun Tsushima	LDP	66,041	45.1	3,787	Sekio Masuta	JIP	42.5	LDP hold
Aomori 2nd	Akinori Eto	LDP	Akinori Eto	LDP	81,054	67.5	52,772	Noriko Nakanowatari	JIP	23.5	LDP hold
Aomori 3rd	Tadamori Ōshima	LDP	Tadamori Ōshima	LDP	59,280	51.2	10,138	Masayo Tanabu	DPJ	42.5	LDP hold
Aomori 4th	Tarō Kimura	LDP	Tarō Kimura	LDP	79,156	59.5	41,050	Takashi Yamauchi	DPJ	28.6	LDP hold
Iwate 1st	Takeshi Shina	DPJ	Takeshi Shina	DPJ	76,787	52.0	30,378	Hinako Takahashi	LDP	31.4	DPJ hold
Iwate 2nd	Shun'ichi Suzuki	LDP	Shun'ichi Suzuki	LDP	73,661	50.1	11,652	Koji Hata	PLP	42.2	LDP hold
Iwate 3rd	Toru Kikawada	DPJ	Toru Kikawada	DPJ	80,339	56.6	34,174	Hidenori Hashimoto	LDP	32.5	DPJ hold
Iwate 4th	Ichirō Ozawa	PLP	Ichirō Ozawa	PLP	75,293	47.8	17,469	Takashi Fujiwara	LDP	36.7	PLP hold
Miyagi 1st	Tōru Doi	LDP	Tōru Doi	LDP	93,345	46.8	12,232	Kazuko Kōri	DPJ	40.7	LDP hold
Miyagi 2nd	Kenya Akiba	LDP	Kenya Akiba	LDP	91,289	45.5	30,636	Hiroki Hayashi	JIP	30.2	LDP hold
Miyagi 3rd	Akihiro Nishimura	LDP	Akihiro Nishimura	LDP	76,246	54.5	27,289	Kiyohito Hashimoto	DPJ	35.0	LDP hold
Miyagi 4th	Shintaro Ito	LDP	Shintaro Ito	LDP	68,773	57.3	33,531	Masae Ido	DPJ	29.4	LDP hold
Miyagi 5th	Jun Azumi	DPJ	Jun Azumi	DPJ	64,753	59.5	30,460	Shigeaki Katsunuma	LDP	31.5	DPJ hold
Miyagi 6th	Itsunori Onodera	LDP	Itsunori Onodera	LDP	101,223	70.6	68,426	Sayuri Kamata	DPJ	22.9	LDP hold
Akita 1st	Hiroyuki Togashi	LDP	Hiroyuki Togashi	LDP	66,388	47.0	8,606	Manabu Terata	DPJ	40.9	LDP hold
Akita 2nd	Katsutoshi Kaneda	LDP	Katsutoshi Kaneda	LDP	82,046	54.7	25,345	Takashi Midorikawa	DPJ	37.8	LDP hold
Akita 3rd	Nobuhide Minorikawa	LDP	Nobuhide Minorikawa	LDP	94,096	47.8	5,613	Toshihide Muraoka	JIP	44.9	LDP hold
Yamagata 1st	Toshiaki Endo	LDP	Toshiaki Endo	LDP	98,508	61.1	52,479	Masahiro Harada	DPJ	28.6	LDP hold
Yamagata 2nd	Norikazu Suzuki	LDP	Norikazu Suzuki	LDP	97,915	49.1	7,495	Yōsuke Kondō	DPJ	45.3	LDP hold
Yamagata 3rd	Juichi Abe	Ind.	Ayuko Kato	LDP	79,872	42.9	1,488	Juichi Abe	Ind.	42.1	LDP gain from Ind.
Fukushima 1st	Yoshitami Kameoka	LDP	Yoshitami Kameoka	LDP	102,929	47.4	5,299	Emi Kaneko	DPJ	44.9	LDP hold
Fukushima 2nd	Takumi Nemoto	LDP	Takumi Nemoto	LDP	91,686	55.2	33,328	Mitsunori Okabe	DPJ	35.2	LDP hold
Fukushima 3rd	Kōichirō Genba	DPJ	Kōichirō Genba	DPJ	94,462	60.0	45,288	Kentarō Uesugi	LDP	31.2	DPJ hold
Fukushima 4th	Ichirō Kanke	LDP	Shinji Oguma	JIP	56,856	42.8	416	Ichirō Kanke	LDP	42.5	JIP gain from LDP
Fukushima 5th	Goji Sakamoto	LDP	Masayoshi Yoshino	LDP	71,102	46.6	11,061	Izumi Yoshida	DPJ	39.3	LDP hold

Proportional representation results
Party	Votes	Seats	Rank	Elected member	Constituency	Ratio
LDP	1,265,372 (32.9%)	5	1	Ichirō Kanke	Fukushima 4th	99.3%
LDP	1,265,372 (32.9%)	5	1	Takashi Fujiwara	Iwate 4th	76.8%
LDP	1,265,372 (32.9%)	5	1	Hinako Takahashi	Iwate 1st	60.4%
LDP	1,265,372 (32.9%)	5	1	Hidenori Hashimoto	Iwate 3rd	57.5%
LDP	1,265,372 (32.9%)	5	1	Shigeaki Katsunuma	Miyagi 5th	53.0%
DPJ	863,539 (22.5%)	4	1	Emi Kaneko	Fukushima 1st	94.9%
DPJ	863,539 (22.5%)	4	1	Yōsuke Kondō	Yamagata 2nd	92.3%
DPJ	863,539 (22.5%)	4	1	Manabu Terata	Akita 1st	87.0%
DPJ	863,539 (22.5%)	4	1	Kazuko Kōri	Miyagi 1st	86.9%
JIP	499,437 (13.0%)	2	1	Sekio Masuta	Aomori 1st	94.3%
JIP	499,437 (13.0%)	2	1	Toshihide Muraoka	Akita 3rd	94.0%
Komei	431,169 (11.2%)	2	1	Yoshihisa Inoue		
Komei	431,169 (11.2%)	2	2	Yuichi Mayama		
JCP	379,811 (9.9%)	1	1	Chizuko Takahashi		

== Northern Kanto block ==
2014 Japanese general election in Northern Kanto
- 14 December 2014

All 52 seats to the House of Representatives
	Majority party	Minority party	Third party
Party	LDP	DPJ	Komeito
Last election	33 seats	5 seats	3 seats
Constituency	26	4	0
PR seats	8	4	3
Total	34	8	3
Seat change	▲1	▲3	0
	Fourth party	Fifth party	Sixth party
Party	JIP	JCP	Ind.
Last election	4 seats	1 seat	2 seats
Constituency	0	0	2
PR seats	3	2	–
Total	3	2	2
Seat change	▼1	▲1	0

Single-member constituency results in Northern Kanto
Constituency	Previous member		Elected member		Votes	%	Margin	Runner-up		%	Status
Ibaraki 1st	Yoshinori Tadokoro	LDP	Yoshinori Tadokoro	LDP	105,536	49.1	28,357	Nobuyuki Fukushima	DPJ	35.9	LDP hold
Ibaraki 2nd	Fukushiro Nukaga	LDP	Fukushiro Nukaga	LDP	142,238	76.7	98,935	Hiroko Kawai	JCP	23.3	LDP hold
Ibaraki 3rd	Yasuhiro Hanashi	LDP	Yasuhiro Hanashi	LDP	120,500	57.6	65,397	Akira Ishii	JIP	26.4	LDP hold
Ibaraki 4th	Hiroshi Kajiyama	LDP	Hiroshi Kajiyama	LDP	95,655	64.5	54,148	Mamoru Takano	DPJ	28.0	LDP hold
Ibaraki 5th	Akihiro Ohata	DPJ	Akihiro Ohata	DPJ	60,688	48.3	6,956	Akimasa Ishikawa	LDP	42.8	DPJ hold
Ibaraki 6th	Yuya Niwa	LDP	Yuya Niwa	LDP	119,116	51.8	33,996	Yamato Aoyama	DPJ	37.0	LDP hold
Ibaraki 7th	Kishirō Nakamura	Ind.	Kishirō Nakamura	Ind.	88,393	51.1	22,755	Keiko Nagaoka	LDP	38.0	Ind. hold
Tochigi 1st	Hajime Funada	LDP	Hajime Funada	LDP	110,030	56.5	46,698	Yuji Kashiwakura	DPJ	32.5	LDP hold
Tochigi 2nd	Koya Nishikawa	LDP	Akio Fukuda	DPJ	62,439	46.7	199	Koya Nishikawa	LDP	46.5	DPJ gain from LDP
Tochigi 3rd	Yoshimi Watanabe	Ind.	Kazuo Yana	LDP	62,814	48.7	11,187	Yoshimi Watanabe	Ind.	40.1	LDP gain from Ind.
Tochigi 4th	Tsutomu Sato	LDP	Tsutomu Sato	LDP	114,328	59.1	52,077	Takao Fujioka	DPJ	32.2	LDP hold
Tochigi 5th	Toshimitsu Motegi	LDP	Toshimitsu Motegi	LDP	101,514	76.5	70,395	Hitoshi Kawakami	JCP	23.5	LDP hold
Gunma 1st	Genichiro Sata	LDP	Genichiro Sata	LDP	61,927	33.0	7,397	Hiroshi Ueno	Ind.	29.0	LDP hold
Gunma 2nd	Toshiro Ino	LDP	Toshiro Ino	LDP	84,530	53.6	31,492	Takashi Ishizeki	JIP	33.6	LDP hold
Gunma 3rd	Hiroyoshi Sasagawa	LDP	Hiroyoshi Sasagawa	LDP	83,837	56.2	34,343	Kaichi Hasegawa	DPJ	33.2	LDP hold
Gunma 4th	Tatsuo Fukuda	LDP	Tatsuo Fukuda	LDP	102,153	71.3	61,005	Sadao Hagiwara	JCP	28.7	LDP hold
Gunma 5th	Yūko Obuchi	LDP	Yūko Obuchi	LDP	114,458	71.0	90,868	Hitoshi Kobayashi	SDP	14.6	LDP hold
Saitama 1st	Hideki Murai	LDP	Hideki Murai	LDP	105,760	46.9	22,903	Koichi Takemasa	DPJ	36.8	LDP hold
Saitama 2nd	Yoshitaka Shindō	LDP	Yoshitaka Shindō	LDP	128,938	64.8	58,864	Tomoko Okuda	JCP	35.2	LDP hold
Saitama 3rd	Hitoshi Kikawada	LDP	Hitoshi Kikawada	LDP	107,986	49.6	32,271	Ritsuo Hosokawa	DPJ	34.8	LDP hold
Saitama 4th	Mayuko Toyota	LDP	Mayuko Toyota	LDP	88,730	48.1	26,668	Hideo Jinpu	DPJ	33.6	LDP hold
Saitama 5th	Yukio Edano	DPJ	Yukio Edano	DPJ	90,030	46.1	3,394	Hideki Makihara	LDP	44.4	DPJ hold
Saitama 6th	Kazuyuki Nakane	LDP	Atsushi Oshima	DPJ	103,918	46.2	9,615	Kazuyuki Nakane	LDP	41.9	DPJ gain from LDP
Saitama 7th	Saichi Kamiyama	LDP	Saichi Kamiyama	LDP	89,089	43.0	15,576	Yasuko Komiyama	DPJ	35.5	LDP hold
Saitama 8th	Masahiko Shibayama	LDP	Masahiko Shibayama	LDP	93,126	50.3	31,415	Masatoshi Onozuka	DPJ	33.3	LDP hold
Saitama 9th	Taku Otsuka	LDP	Taku Otsuka	LDP	111,316	53.0	51,195	Hitoshi Aoyagi	JIP	28.6	LDP hold
Saitama 10th	Taimei Yamaguchi	LDP	Taimei Yamaguchi	LDP	83,544	47.4	18,440	Yunosuke Sakamoto	JIP	36.9	LDP hold
Saitama 11th	Ryuji Koizumi	Ind.	Ryuji Koizumi	Ind.	100,636	55.4	47,360	Tomohiro Konno	LDP	29.3	Ind. hold
Saitama 12th	Atsushi Nonaka	LDP	Atsushi Nonaka	LDP	72,422	38.6	15,123	Toshikazu Morita	PFG	30.5	LDP hold
Saitama 13th	Shinako Tsuchiya	LDP	Shinako Tsuchiya	LDP	90,167	50.4	45,251	Koichi Yamauchi	DPJ	25.0	LDP hold
Saitama 14th	Hiromi Mitsubayashi	LDP	Hiromi Mitsubayashi	LDP	96,511	47.6	23,191	Yoshihiro Suzuki	JIP	36.1	LDP hold
Saitama 15th	Ryosei Tanaka	LDP	Ryosei Tanaka	LDP	98,287	52.3	37,616	Satoshi Takayama	DPJ	32.3	LDP hold

Proportional representation results
Party	Votes	Seats	Rank	Elected member	Constituency	Ratio
LDP	2,034,586 (34.6%)	8	1	Koya Nishikawa	Tochigi 2nd	99.7%
LDP	2,034,586 (34.6%)	8	1	Hideki Makihara	Saitama 5th	96.2%
LDP	2,034,586 (34.6%)	8	1	Kazuyuki Nakane	Saitama 6th	90.7%
LDP	2,034,586 (34.6%)	8	1	Akimasa Ishikawa	Ibaraki 5th	88.5%
LDP	2,034,586 (34.6%)	8	1	Keiko Nagaoka	Ibaraki 7th	75.3%
LDP	2,034,586 (34.6%)	8	1	Tomohiro Konno	Saitama 11th	52.9%
LDP	2,034,586 (34.6%)	8	34	Asako Omi		
LDP	2,034,586 (34.6%)	8	33	Yayoi Kimura		
DPJ	1,049,602 (17.8%)	4	1	Yasuko Komiyama	Saitama 7th	82.5%
DPJ	1,049,602 (17.8%)	4	1	Takeshi Miyazaki	Gunma 1st	80.5%
DPJ	1,049,602 (17.8%)	4	1	Koichi Takemasa	Saitama 1st	78.4%
DPJ	1,049,602 (17.8%)	4	1	Nobuyuki Fukushima	Ibaraki 1st	73.1%
Komei	868,102 (14.7%)	3	1	Keiichi Ishii		
Komei	868,102 (14.7%)	3	2	Mitsunari Okamoto		
Komei	868,102 (14.7%)	3	3	Keiichi Koshimizu		
JIP	816,014 (13.9%)	3	1	Yunosuke Sakamoto	Saitama 10th	77.9%
JIP	816,014 (13.9%)	3	1	Yoshihiro Suzuki	Saitama 14th	76.0%
JIP	816,014 (13.9%)	3	1	Takashi Ishizeki	Gunma 2nd	62.7%
JCP	686,893 (11.7%)	2	1	Tetsuya Shiokawa		
JCP	686,893 (11.7%)	2	2	Saeko Umemura		

== Southern Kanto block ==
2014 Japanese general election in Southern Kanto
- 14 December 2014

All 55 seats to the House of Representatives
	Majority party	Minority party	Third party
Party	LDP	DPJ	JIP
Last election	32 seats	8 seats	5 seats
Constituency	24	5	1
PR seats	8	4	4
Total	32	9	5
Seat change	0	▲1	0
	Fourth party	Fifth party	Sixth party
Party	Komeito	JCP	Ind.
Last election	3 seats	1 seat	1 seat
Constituency	1	0	2
PR seats	3	3	–
Total	4	3	2
Seat change	▲1	▲2	▲1

Single-member constituency results in Southern Kanto
Constituency	Previous member		Elected member		Votes	%	Margin	Runner-up		%	Status
Chiba 1st	Kaname Tajima	DPJ	Kaname Tajima	DPJ	84,755	41.1	7,818	Hiroaki Kadoyama	LDP	37.3	DPJ hold
Chiba 2nd	Takayuki Kobayashi	LDP	Takayuki Kobayashi	LDP	118,592	54.2	62,113	Kenta Fujimaki	JIP	25.8	LDP hold
Chiba 3rd	Hirokazu Matsuno	LDP	Hirokazu Matsuno	LDP	85,277	53.4	55,039	Kazumasa Okajima	PLP	18.9	LDP hold
Chiba 4th	Yoshihiko Noda	DPJ	Yoshihiko Noda	DPJ	119,193	51.7	51,593	Tetsuya Kimura	LDP	29.3	DPJ hold
Chiba 5th	Kentaro Sonoura	LDP	Kentaro Sonoura	LDP	105,941	53.8	48,441	Hirotami Murakoshi	DPJ	29.2	LDP hold
Chiba 6th	Hiromichi Watanabe	LDP	Hiromichi Watanabe	LDP	77,066	45.9	26,743	Yukio Ubukata	DPJ	29.9	LDP hold
Chiba 7th	Ken Saitō	LDP	Ken Saitō	LDP	111,030	55.0	62,379	Sadamichi Ishizuka	JIP	24.1	LDP hold
Chiba 8th	Yoshitaka Sakurada	LDP	Yoshitaka Sakurada	LDP	98,569	49.2	28,902	Kazumi Ota	JIP	34.8	LDP hold
Chiba 9th	Masatoshi Akimoto	LDP	Masatoshi Akimoto	LDP	85,092	42.9	16,528	Soichiro Okuno	DPJ	34.6	LDP hold
Chiba 10th	Motoo Hayashi	LDP	Motoo Hayashi	LDP	97,783	55.0	31,974	Hajime Yatagawa	DPJ	37.0	LDP hold
Chiba 11th	Eisuke Mori	LDP	Eisuke Mori	LDP	110,965	63.1	72,182	Kenichi Kaneko	PLP	22.1	LDP hold
Chiba 12th	Yasukazu Hamada	LDP	Yasukazu Hamada	LDP	134,037	74.3	87,640	Nobuhisa Yonemoto	JCP	25.7	LDP hold
Chiba 13th	Takaki Shirasuka	LDP	Takaki Shirasuka	LDP	96,294	50.9	31,569	Yasuhiko Wakai	DPJ	34.2	LDP hold
Kanagawa 1st	Jun Matsumoto	LDP	Jun Matsumoto	LDP	113,844	52.4	45,783	Go Shinohara	JIP	31.3	LDP hold
Kanagawa 2nd	Yoshihide Suga	LDP	Yoshihide Suga	LDP	147,084	67.7	99,965	Chiemi Miwa	JCP	21.7	LDP hold
Kanagawa 3rd	Hachiro Okonogi	LDP	Hachiro Okonogi	LDP	102,323	50.2	52,124	Koichiro Katsumata	DPJ	24.6	LDP hold
Kanagawa 4th	Keiichiro Asao	Ind.	Keiichiro Asao	Ind.	91,063	48.1	29,584	Tomohiro Yamamoto	LDP	32.5	Ind. hold
Kanagawa 5th	Manabu Sakai	LDP	Manabu Sakai	LDP	112,963	47.8	56,316	Masashi Mito	JIP	23.9	LDP hold
Kanagawa 6th	Isamu Ueda	Komei	Isamu Ueda	Komei	78,746	39.9	26,378	Yoichiro Aoyagi	JIP	26.5	Komei hold
Kanagawa 7th	Keisuke Suzuki	LDP	Keisuke Suzuki	LDP	101,088	44.4	50,577	Kazuma Nakatani	DPJ	22.2	LDP hold
Kanagawa 8th	Kenji Eda	JIP	Kenji Eda	JIP	116,189	54.5	43,157	Mineyuki Fukuda	LDP	34.2	JIP hold
Kanagawa 9th	Hirofumi Ryu	DPJ	Hirofumi Ryu	DPJ	64,534	37.9	4,543	Norihiro Nakayama	LDP	35.2	DPJ hold
Kanagawa 10th	Kazunori Tanaka	LDP	Kazunori Tanaka	LDP	114,564	52.2	47,667	Koriki Jojima	DPJ	30.5	LDP hold
Kanagawa 11th	Shinjirō Koizumi	LDP	Shinjirō Koizumi	LDP	168,953	83.3	135,023	Kazuhiro Seto	JCP	16.7	LDP hold
Kanagawa 12th	Tsuyoshi Hoshino	LDP	Tsuyoshi Hoshino	LDP	83,327	42.4	715	Tomoko Abe	TPJ	42.1	LDP hold
Kanagawa 13th	Akira Amari	LDP	Akira Amari	LDP	142,201	60.5	83,260	Yuta Ito	JIP	25.1	LDP hold
Kanagawa 14th	Jiro Akama	LDP	Jiro Akama	LDP	109,408	47.2	25,923	Kentaro Motomura	DPJ	36.0	LDP hold
Kanagawa 15th	Taro Kono	LDP	Taro Kono	LDP	155,388	66.8	116,177	Toichiro Ikeda	Ind.	16.9	LDP hold
Kanagawa 16th	Hiroyuki Yoshiie	LDP	Yuichi Goto	DPJ	103,116	45.8	1,489	Hiroyuki Yoshiie	LDP	45.2	DPJ gain from LDP
Kanagawa 17th	Karen Makishima	LDP	Karen Makishima	LDP	118,537	53.4	38,749	Yosuke Kamiyama	DPJ	36.0	LDP hold
Kanagawa 18th	Daishiro Yamagiwa	LDP	Daishiro Yamagiwa	LDP	86,869	40.0	27,731	Hiroshi Nakada	PRG	27.2	LDP hold
Yamanashi 1st	Noriko Miyagawa	LDP	Katsuhito Nakajima	DPJ	102,111	44.0	1,085	Noriko Miyagawa	LDP	43.5	DPJ gain from LDP
Yamanashi 2nd	Kotaro Nagasaki	Ind.	Kotaro Nagasaki	Ind.	85,117	50.7	17,008	Noriko Horiuchi	LDP	40.6	Ind. hold
Yamanashi 3rd	Vacant	DPJ	Seat abolished								DPJ loss

Proportional representation results
Party	Votes	Seats	Rank	Elected member	Constituency	Ratio
LDP	2,321,609 (34.0%)	8	1	Shinichi Nakatani		
LDP	2,321,609 (34.0%)	8	2	Noriko Miyagawa	Yamanashi 1st	98.9%
LDP	2,321,609 (34.0%)	8	2	Hiroyuki Yoshiie	Kanagawa 16th	98.6%
LDP	2,321,609 (34.0%)	8	2	Norihiro Nakayama	Kanagawa 9th	93.0%
LDP	2,321,609 (34.0%)	8	2	Hiroaki Kadoyama	Chiba 1st	90.8%
LDP	2,321,609 (34.0%)	8	2	Noriko Horiuchi	Yamanashi 2nd	80.0%
LDP	2,321,609 (34.0%)	8	2	Tomohiro Yamamoto	Kanagawa 4th	67.5%
LDP	2,321,609 (34.0%)	8	2	Mineyuki Fukuda	Kanagawa 8th	62.9%
DPJ	1,203,572 (17.6%)	4	1	Tomoko Abe	Kanagawa 12th	99.1%
DPJ	1,203,572 (17.6%)	4	1	Soichiro Okuno	Chiba 9th	80.6%
DPJ	1,203,572 (17.6%)	4	1	Kentaro Motomura	Kanagawa 14th	76.3%
DPJ	1,203,572 (17.6%)	4	1	Yosuke Kamiyama	Kanagawa 17th	67.3%
JIP	1,053,221 (15.4%)	4	1	Kazumi Ota	Chiba 8th	70.7%
JIP	1,053,221 (15.4%)	4	1	Yoichiro Aoyagi	Kanagawa 6th	66.5%
JIP	1,053,221 (15.4%)	4	1	Go Shinohara	Kanagawa 1st	59.8%
JIP	1,053,221 (15.4%)	4	1	Masashi Mito	Kanagawa 5th	50.1%
Komei	875,712 (12.8%)	3	1	Shigeyuki Tomita		
Komei	875,712 (12.8%)	3	2	Noriko Furuya		
Komei	875,712 (12.8%)	3	3	Hideo Tsunoda		
JCP	813,634 (11.9%)	3	1	Kazuo Shii		
JCP	813,634 (11.9%)	3	2	Kimie Hatano		
JCP	813,634 (11.9%)	3	3	Kazuko Saito		

== Tokyo block ==
2014 Japanese general election in Tokyo
- 14 December 2014

All 42 seats to the House of Representatives
	Majority party	Minority party	Third party
Party	LDP	DPJ	JIP
Last election	26 seats	5 seats	3 seats
Constituency	22	1	1
PR seats	6	3	3
Total	28	4	4
Seat change	▲2	▼1	▲1
	Fourth party	Fifth party
Party	JCP	Komeito
Last election	1 seat	3 seats
Constituency	0	1
PR seats	3	2
Total	3	3
Seat change	▲2	0

Single-member constituency results in Tokyo
Constituency	Previous member		Elected member		Votes	%	Margin	Runner-up		%	Status
Tokyo 1st	Miki Yamada	LDP	Miki Yamada	LDP	107,015	42.7	17,783	Banri Kaieda	DPJ	35.6	LDP hold
Tokyo 2nd	Kiyoto Tsuji	LDP	Kiyoto Tsuji	LDP	103,954	42.6	45,547	Yoshikatsu Nakayama	DPJ	23.9	LDP hold
Tokyo 3rd	Hirotaka Ishihara	LDP	Hirotaka Ishihara	LDP	115,623	44.3	4,270	Jin Matsubara	DPJ	42.6	LDP hold
Tokyo 4th	Masaaki Taira	LDP	Masaaki Taira	LDP	109,377	50.3	60,516	Norihiko Fujita	DPJ	22.5	LDP hold
Tokyo 5th	Kenji Wakamiya	LDP	Kenji Wakamiya	LDP	102,424	39.7	36,169	Yoshio Tezuka	DPJ	25.7	LDP hold
Tokyo 6th	Takao Ochi	LDP	Takao Ochi	LDP	110,872	44.1	21,957	Takayuki Ochiai	JIP	35.4	LDP hold
Tokyo 7th	Akira Nagatsuma	DPJ	Akira Nagatsuma	DPJ	104,422	44.6	20,946	Fumiaki Matsumoto	LDP	35.7	DPJ hold
Tokyo 8th	Nobuteru Ishihara	LDP	Nobuteru Ishihara	LDP	116,193	47.6	42,845	Yoriko Madoka	DPJ	30.0	LDP hold
Tokyo 9th	Isshu Sugawara	LDP	Isshu Sugawara	LDP	123,368	51.4	57,559	Takatane Kuichi	JIP	27.4	LDP hold
Tokyo 10th	Yuriko Koike	LDP	Yuriko Koike	LDP	93,610	50.7	49,487	Takako Ebata	DPJ	23.9	LDP hold
Tokyo 11th	Hakubun Shimomura	LDP	Hakubun Shimomura	LDP	129,587	56.1	86,504	Kanehisa Yamauchi	JCP	18.6	LDP hold
Tokyo 12th	Akihiro Ota	Komei	Akihiro Ota	Komei	88,499	41.6	43,778	Saori Ikeuchi	JCP	21.0	Komei hold
Tokyo 13th	Ichirō Kamoshita	LDP	Ichirō Kamoshita	LDP	113,036	55.5	70,008	Takako Hasegawa	DPJ	21.1	LDP hold
Tokyo 14th	Midori Matsushima	LDP	Midori Matsushima	LDP	87,546	46.6	24,169	Taketsuka Kimura	DPJ	33.7	LDP hold
Tokyo 15th	Mito Kakizawa	JIP	Mito Kakizawa	JIP	88,507	41.3	2,793	Tsukasa Akimoto	LDP	40.0	JIP hold
Tokyo 16th	Hideo Ōnishi	LDP	Hideo Ōnishi	LDP	98,536	46.3	41,835	Akihiro Hatsushika	JIP	26.6	LDP hold
Tokyo 17th	Katsuei Hirasawa	LDP	Katsuei Hirasawa	LDP	125,351	59.3	79,195	Miho Takahashi	JIP	21.9	LDP hold
Tokyo 18th	Masatada Tsuchiya	LDP	Masatada Tsuchiya	LDP	106,143	45.8	16,266	Naoto Kan	DPJ	38.8	LDP hold
Tokyo 19th	Yohei Matsumoto	LDP	Yohei Matsumoto	LDP	107,608	41.0	20,024	Yoshinori Suematsu	DPJ	33.3	LDP hold
Tokyo 20th	Seiji Kihara	LDP	Seiji Kihara	LDP	110,273	52.1	58,911	Mitsuaki Takeda	DPJ	24.3	LDP hold
Tokyo 21st	Akihisa Nagashima	DPJ	Kiyoshi Odawara	LDP	83,984	41.6	1,633	Akihisa Nagashima	DPJ	40.8	LDP gain from DPJ
Tokyo 22nd	Tatsuya Ito	LDP	Tatsuya Ito	LDP	116,757	46.0	36,743	Ikuo Yamahana	DPJ	31.5	LDP hold
Tokyo 23rd	Masanobu Ogura	LDP	Masanobu Ogura	LDP	104,709	41.2	41,003	Mari Kushibuchi	DPJ	25.0	LDP hold
Tokyo 24th	Kōichi Hagiuda	LDP	Kōichi Hagiuda	LDP	126,024	51.7	54,812	Yukihiko Akutsu	DPJ	29.2	LDP hold
Tokyo 25th	Shinji Inoue	LDP	Shinji Inoue	LDP	100,081	61.6	67,394	Yoko Yamashita	DPJ	20.1	LDP hold

Proportional representation results
Party	Votes	Seats	Rank	Elected member	Constituency	Ratio
LDP	1,847,986 (32.1%)	6	1	Tsukasa Akimoto	Tokyo 15th	96.8%
LDP	1,847,986 (32.1%)	6	1	Fumiaki Matsumoto	Tokyo 7th	79.9%
LDP	1,847,986 (32.1%)	6	25	Hayato Suzuki		
LDP	1,847,986 (32.1%)	6	26	Megumi Maekawa		
LDP	1,847,986 (32.1%)	6	27	Masaru Wakasa		
LDP	1,847,986 (32.1%)	6	29	Tsuneo Akaeda		
DPJ	939,795 (16.3%)	3	1	Akihisa Nagashima	Tokyo 21st	98.1%
DPJ	939,795 (16.3%)	3	1	Jin Matsubara	Tokyo 3rd	96.3%
DPJ	939,795 (16.3%)	3	1	Naoto Kan	Tokyo 18th	84.7%
JCP	885,927 (15.4%)	3	1	Akira Kasai		
JCP	885,927 (15.4%)	3	2	Toru Miyamoto		
JCP	885,927 (15.4%)	3	3	Saori Ikeuchi	Tokyo 12th	50.5%
JIP	816,047 (14.2%)	3	1	Takayuki Ochiai	Tokyo 6th	80.2%
JIP	816,047 (14.2%)	3	1	Akihiro Hatsushika	Tokyo 16th	57.5%
JIP	816,047 (14.2%)	3	1	Takatane Kuichi	Tokyo 9th	53.3%
Komei	700,127 (12.1%)	2	1	Yōsuke Takagi		
Komei	700,127 (12.1%)	2	2	Michiyo Takagi		

== Hokuriku-Shin'etsu block ==
2014 Japanese general election in Hokuriku-Shin'etsu
- 14 December 2014

All 31 seats to the House of Representatives
	Majority party	Minority party	Third party
Party	LDP	DPJ	JIP
Last election	22 seats	4 seats	3 seats
Constituency	16	2	1
PR seats	5	3	1
Total	21	5	2
Seat change	▼1	▲1	▼1
	Fourth party	Fifth party
Party	JCP	Komeito
Last election	0 seats	1 seat
Constituency	0	0
PR seats	1	1
Total	1	1
Seat change	▲1	0

Single-member constituency results in Hokuriku-Shin'etsu
Constituency	Previous member		Elected member		Votes	%	Margin	Runner-up		%	Status
Niigata 1st	Toru Ishizaki	LDP	Toru Ishizaki	LDP	92,656	47.0	8,083	Chinami Nishimura	DPJ	42.9	LDP hold
Niigata 2nd	Kenichi Hosoda	LDP	Kenichi Hosoda	LDP	70,589	43.0	102	Eiichiro Washio	DPJ	42.9	LDP hold
Niigata 3rd	Hiroaki Saito	LDP	Takahiro Kuroiwa	DPJ	82,619	49.1	8,300	Hiroaki Saito	LDP	44.2	DPJ gain from LDP
Niigata 4th	Megumi Kaneko	LDP	Megumi Kaneko	LDP	77,137	46.7	3,064	Makiko Kikuta	DPJ	44.8	LDP hold
Niigata 5th	Tadayoshi Nagashima	LDP	Tadayoshi Nagashima	LDP	81,176	57.3	33,756	Yuko Mori	PLP	33.5	LDP hold
Niigata 6th	Shuichi Takatori	LDP	Shuichi Takatori	LDP	83,638	52.7	20,872	Mamoru Umetani	DPJ	39.5	LDP hold
Toyama 1st	Hiroaki Tabata	LDP	Hiroaki Tabata	LDP	70,085	58.8	30,836	Toyofumi Yoshida	JIP	32.9	LDP hold
Toyama 2nd	Mitsuhiro Miyakoshi	LDP	Mitsuhiro Miyakoshi	LDP	82,898	70.6	59,548	Atsushi Azuma	SDP	19.9	LDP hold
Toyama 3rd	Keiichiro Tachibana	LDP	Keiichiro Tachibana	LDP	138,991	81.2	106,873	Hiroshi Sakamoto	JCP	18.8	LDP hold
Ishikawa 1st	Hiroshi Hase	LDP	Hiroshi Hase	LDP	76,422	50.7	16,832	Mieko Tanaka	DPJ	39.5	LDP hold
Ishikawa 2nd	Hajime Sasaki	LDP	Hajime Sasaki	LDP	110,583	75.5	79,694	Hiroshi Nishimura	JCP	21.1	LDP hold
Ishikawa 3rd	Shigeo Kitamura	LDP	Shigeo Kitamura	LDP	71,384	49.6	6,444	Kazuya Kondo	DPJ	45.1	LDP hold
Fukui 1st	Tomomi Inada	LDP	Tomomi Inada	LDP	116,855	64.8	69,053	Koji Suzuki	JIP	26.5	LDP hold
Fukui 2nd	Taku Yamamoto	LDP	Tsuyoshi Takagi	LDP	83,086	61.5	41,054	Kazunori Tsuji	DPJ	31.1	LDP hold
Fukui 3rd	Tsuyoshi Takagi	LDP	Seat abolished								LDP loss
Nagano 1st	Takashi Shinohara	DPJ	Takashi Shinohara	DPJ	96,333	45.8	22,196	Yutaka Komatsu	LDP	35.3	DPJ hold
Nagano 2nd	Shunsuke Mutai	LDP	Shunsuke Mutai	LDP	75,718	37.0	12,160	Mitsu Shimojo	DPJ	31.1	LDP hold
Nagano 3rd	Yoshiyuki Terashima	DPJ	Yosei Ide	JIP	77,289	34.4	13,892	Yoshiyuki Terashima	DPJ	28.2	JIP gain from DPJ
Nagano 4th	Shigeyuki Goto	LDP	Shigeyuki Goto	LDP	63,121	46.1	11,305	Koji Yazaki	DPJ	37.8	LDP hold
Nagano 5th	Ichiro Miyashita	LDP	Ichiro Miyashita	LDP	91,089	54.7	44,494	Kosuke Nakajima	DPJ	28.0	LDP hold

Proportional representation results
Party	Votes	Seats	Rank	Elected member	Constituency	Ratio
LDP	1,122,585 (36.1%)	5	1	Taku Yamamoto		
LDP	1,122,585 (36.1%)	5	2	Hiroaki Saito	Niigata 3rd	90.0%
LDP	1,122,585 (36.1%)	5	2	Yutaka Komatsu	Nagano 1st	77.0%
LDP	1,122,585 (36.1%)	5	2	Hitoshi Kiuchi	Nagano 3rd	72.9%
LDP	1,122,585 (36.1%)	5	21	Shigeyoshi Sukeda		
DPJ	690,721 (22.2%)	3	1	Eiichiro Washio	Niigata 2nd	99.9%
DPJ	690,721 (22.2%)	3	1	Makiko Kikuta	Niigata 4th	96.0%
DPJ	690,721 (22.2%)	3	1	Chinami Nishimura	Niigata 1st	91.3%
JIP	432,249 (13.9%)	1	1	Toyofumi Yoshida	Toyama 1st	56.0%
JCP	315,071 (10.1%)	1	1	Yasufumi Fujino		
Komei	293,194 (9.4%)	1	1	Yoshio Urushibara		

== Tokai block ==
2014 Japanese general election in Tokai
- 14 December 2014

All 54 seats to the House of Representatives
	Majority party	Minority party	Third party
Party	LDP	DPJ	JIP
Last election	34 seats	10 seats	4 seats
Constituency	22	10	1
PR seats	8	5	3
Total	30	15	4
Seat change	▼4	▲5	0
	Fourth party	Fifth party
Party	Komeito	JCP
Last election	2 seats	1 seats
Constituency	0	0
PR seats	3	2
Total	3	2
Seat change	▲1	▲1

Single-member constituency results in Tokai
Constituency	Previous member		Elected member		Votes	%	Margin	Runner-up		%	Status
Gifu 1st	Seiko Noda	LDP	Seiko Noda	LDP	82,434	57.5	44,032	Rie Yoshida	DPJ	26.8	LDP hold
Gifu 2nd	Yasufumi Tanahashi	LDP	Yasufumi Tanahashi	LDP	108,234	75.5	73,142	Fusayoshi Morizakura	JCP	24.5	LDP hold
Gifu 3rd	Yoji Muto	LDP	Yoji Muto	LDP	107,872	52.6	30,798	Yasuhiro Sonoda	DPJ	37.6	LDP hold
Gifu 4th	Kazuyoshi Kaneko	LDP	Kazuyoshi Kaneko	LDP	104,139	51.4	24,097	Masato Imai	JIP	39.5	LDP hold
Gifu 5th	Keiji Furuya	LDP	Keiji Furuya	LDP	90,116	55.8	37,005	Yoshinobu Achiha	DPJ	32.9	LDP hold
Shizuoka 1st	Yōko Kamikawa	LDP	Yōko Kamikawa	LDP	89,544	44.9	41,558	Masanari Koike	JIP	24.1	LDP hold
Shizuoka 2nd	Tatsunori Ibayashi	LDP	Tatsunori Ibayashi	LDP	129,311	59.9	66,233	Tsutomu Matsuo	DPJ	29.2	LDP hold
Shizuoka 3rd	Hiroyuki Miyazawa	LDP	Hiroyuki Miyazawa	LDP	105,347	49.8	17,547	Nobuhiro Koyama	DPJ	41.5	LDP hold
Shizuoka 4th	Yoshio Mochizuki	LDP	Yoshio Mochizuki	LDP	92,416	53.3	25,645	Kenji Tamura	DPJ	38.5	LDP hold
Shizuoka 5th	Goshi Hosono	DPJ	Goshi Hosono	DPJ	143,012	58.6	58,438	Takeru Yoshikawa	LDP	34.6	DPJ hold
Shizuoka 6th	Shu Watanabe	DPJ	Shu Watanabe	DPJ	114,161	48.5	11,447	Takaaki Katsumata	LDP	43.7	DPJ hold
Shizuoka 7th	Minoru Kiuchi	LDP	Minoru Kiuchi	LDP	132,698	70.9	95,044	Taiko Matsumoto	DPJ	20.1	LDP hold
Shizuoka 8th	Ryū Shionoya	LDP	Ryū Shionoya	LDP	98,485	50.9	35,687	Kentaro Genma	JIP	32.4	LDP hold
Aichi 1st	Hiromichi Kumada	LDP	Hiromichi Kumada	LDP	73,003	42.4	23,773	Tsunehiko Yoshida	DPJ	28.6	LDP hold
Aichi 2nd	Motohisa Furukawa	DPJ	Motohisa Furukawa	DPJ	102,058	52.9	34,377	Tetsuya Togo	LDP	36.1	DPJ hold
Aichi 3rd	Yoshitaka Ikeda	LDP	Shoichi Kondo	DPJ	82,422	41.4	10,069	Yoshitaka Ikeda	LDP	36.4	DPJ gain from LDP
Aichi 4th	Shōzō Kudō	LDP	Shōzō Kudō	LDP	66,213	38.6	18,922	Yoshio Maki	JIP	27.6	LDP hold
Aichi 5th	Hirotaka Akamatsu	DPJ	Hirotaka Akamatsu	DPJ	84,226	44.5	12,610	Kenji Kanda	LDP	37.9	DPJ gain from LDP
Aichi 6th	Hideki Niwa	LDP	Hideki Niwa	LDP	106,887	52.0	40,850	Kazuyoshi Morimoto	DPJ	32.1	LDP hold
Aichi 7th	Junji Suzuki	LDP	Shiori Yamao	DPJ	113,474	46.6	5,323	Junji Suzuki	LDP	44.4	DPJ gain from LDP
Aichi 8th	Tadahiko Ito	LDP	Tadahiko Ito	LDP	109,723	47.6	10,665	Yutaka Banno	DPJ	42.9	LDP hold
Aichi 9th	Yasumasa Nagasaka	LDP	Yasumasa Nagasaka	LDP	98,594	47.3	12,627	Mitsunori Okamoto	DPJ	41.2	LDP hold
Aichi 10th	Tetsuma Esaki	LDP	Tetsuma Esaki	LDP	91,978	44.5	46,276	Kazumi Sugimoto	Ind.	22.1	LDP hold
Aichi 11th	Shinichiro Furumoto	DPJ	Shinichiro Furumoto	DPJ	126,498	52.6	29,331	Tetsuya Yagi	LDP	40.4	DPJ hold
Aichi 12th	Shuhei Aoyama	LDP	Kazuhiko Shigetoku	JIP	131,618	48.5	13,453	Shuhei Aoyama	LDP	43.5	JIP gain from LDP
Aichi 13th	Sei Oomi	LDP	Kensuke Onishi	DPJ	116,652	49.6	15,508	Sei Oomi	LDP	43.0	DPJ gain from LDP
Aichi 14th	Soichiro Imaeda	LDP	Soichiro Imaeda	LDP	77,513	50.2	15,410	Katsumasa Suzuki	DPJ	40.2	LDP hold
Aichi 15th	Yukinori Nemoto	LDP	Yukinori Nemoto	LDP	97,152	52.6	32,672	Kenichiro Seki	DPJ	34.9	LDP hold
Mie 1st	Jirō Kawasaki	LDP	Jirō Kawasaki	LDP	88,219	53.0	31,715	Naohisa Matsuda	JIP	33.9	LDP hold
Mie 2nd	Masaharu Nakagawa	DPJ	Masaharu Nakagawa	DPJ	91,676	52.8	28,489	Yoshikazu Shimada	LDP	36.4	DPJ hold
Mie 3rd	Katsuya Okada	DPJ	Katsuya Okada	DPJ	120,950	64.0	67,291	Koji Shimada	LDP	28.4	DPJ hold
Mie 4th	Norihisa Tamura	LDP	Norihisa Tamura	LDP	94,725	74.5	62,296	Honen Matsuki	JCP	25.5	LDP hold
Mie 5th	Norio Mitsuya	LDP	Norio Mitsuya	LDP	86,104	54.4	27,220	Daisuke Fujita	DPJ	37.2	LDP hold

Proportional representation results
Party	Votes	Seats	Rank	Elected member	Constituency	Ratio
LDP	2,147,672 (33.3%)	8	1	Junji Suzuki	Aichi 7th	95.3%
LDP	2,147,672 (33.3%)	8	1	Takaaki Katsumata	Shizuoka 6th	90.0%
LDP	2,147,672 (33.3%)	8	1	Shuhei Aoyama	Aichi 12th	89.8%
LDP	2,147,672 (33.3%)	8	1	Yoshitaka Ikeda	Aichi 3rd	87.8%
LDP	2,147,672 (33.3%)	8	1	Sei Oomi	Aichi 13th	86.7%
LDP	2,147,672 (33.3%)	8	1	Kenji Kanda	Aichi 5th	85.0%
LDP	2,147,672 (33.3%)	8	1	Tetsuya Yagi	Aichi 11th	76.8%
LDP	2,147,672 (33.3%)	8	1	Yoshikazu Shimada	Mie 2nd	68.9%
DPJ	1,491,764 (23.1%)	5	1	Yasuhiro Nakane		
DPJ	1,491,764 (23.1%)	5	2	Yutaka Banno	Aichi 8th	90.3%
DPJ	1,491,764 (23.1%)	5	2	Mitsunori Okamoto	Aichi 9th	87.2%
DPJ	1,491,764 (23.1%)	5	2	Nobuhiro Koyama	Shizuoka 3rd	83.3%
DPJ	1,491,764 (23.1%)	5	2	Katsumasa Suzuki	Aichi 14th	80.1%
JIP	964,240 (15.0%)	3	1	Masato Imai	Gifu 4th	76.9%
JIP	964,240 (15.0%)	3	1	Yoshio Maki	Aichi 4th	71.4%
JIP	964,240 (15.0%)	3	1	Naohisa Matsuda	Mie 1st	64.0%
Komei	804,089 (12.5%)	3	1	Yoshinori Oguchi		
Komei	804,089 (12.5%)	3	2	Wataru Ito		
Komei	804,089 (12.5%)	3	3	Yasuhiro Nakagawa		
JCP	618,695 (9.6%)	2	1	Nobuko Motomura		
JCP	618,695 (9.6%)	2	2	Yukihiro Shimazu		

== Kinki block ==
2014 Japanese general election in Kinki
- 14 December 2014

All 77 seats to the House of Representatives
	Majority party	Minority party	Third party
Party	LDP	JIP	Komeito
Last election	31 seats	22 seats	10 seats
Constituency	39	6	6
PR seats	9	8	4
Total	38	14	10
Seat change	▲7	▼8	0
	Fourth party	Fifth party	Sixth party
Party	DPJ	JCP	Ind.
Last election	9 seats	2 seats	0 seats
Constituency	6	0	2
PR seats	4	4	–
Total	10	4	2
Seat change	▲1	▲2	▲2

Single-member constituency results in Kinki
Constituency	Previous member		Elected member		Votes	%	Margin	Runner-up		%	Status
Shiga 1st	Toshitaka Ōoka	LDP	Toshitaka Ōoka	LDP	78,567	46.2	9,024	Tatsuo Kawabata	DPJ	40.9	LDP hold
Shiga 2nd	Kenichiro Ueno	LDP	Kenichiro Ueno	LDP	65,102	48.8	11,007	Issei Tajima	DPJ	40.6	LDP hold
Shiga 3rd	Nobuhide Takemura	LDP	Nobuhide Takemura	LDP	70,789	53.8	24,196	Yasue Ogawa	DPJ	35.4	LDP hold
Shiga 4th	Takaya Mutō	LDP	Takaya Mutō	LDP	60,460	38.7	19,467	Hiroki Iwanaga	JIP	26.3	LDP hold
Kyoto 1st	Bunmei Ibuki	LDP	Bunmei Ibuki	LDP	73,684	40.6	20,305	Keiji Kokuta	JCP	29.4	LDP hold
Kyoto 2nd	Seiji Maehara	DPJ	Seiji Maehara	DPJ	66,227	50.4	29,047	Koji Uenaka	LDP	28.3	DPJ hold
Kyoto 3rd	Kensuke Miyazaki	LDP	Kensuke Miyazaki	LDP	59,437	35.8	4,537	Kenta Izumi	DPJ	33.1	LDP hold
Kyoto 4th	Hideyuki Tanaka	LDP	Hideyuki Tanaka	LDP	75,744	39.1	17,052	Keiro Kitagami	DPJ	30.3	LDP hold
Kyoto 5th	Sadakazu Tanigaki	LDP	Sadakazu Tanigaki	LDP	76,733	56.6	37,555	Mai Ohara	DPJ	28.9	LDP hold
Kyoto 6th	Kazunori Yamanoi	DPJ	Kazunori Yamanoi	DPJ	102,030	44.3	7,294	Hiroshi Ando	LDP	41.1	DPJ hold
Osaka 1st	Inoue Hidetaka	JIP	Inoue Hidetaka	JIP	75,016	42.4	3,368	Hiroyuki Onishi	LDP	40.5	JIP hold
Osaka 2nd	ja	LDP	Akira Sato	LDP	78,326	46.5	22,301	Tamotsu Shiiki	JIP	33.2	LDP hold
Osaka 3rd	Shigeki Sato	Komei	Shigeki Sato	Komei	84,943	57.2	21,414	Yui Watanabe	JCP	42.8	Komei hold
Osaka 4th	Masatoshi Murakami	JIP	Yasuhide Nakayama	LDP	82,538	38.9	8,437	Hirofumi Yoshimura	JIP	34.9	LDP gain from JIP
Osaka 5th	Tōru Kunishige	Komei	Tōru Kunishige	Komei	92,681	57.5	24,251	Misuzu Ishii	JCP	42.5	Komei hold
Osaka 6th	Shinichi Isa	Komei	Shinichi Isa	Komei	94,308	56.3	52,043	Koichi Watashi	JCP	25.3	Komei hold
Osaka 7th	Naomi Tokashiki	LDP	Naomi Tokashiki	LDP	81,109	43.2	13,390	Sayuri Uenishi	JIP	36.1	LDP hold
Osaka 8th	Tomohiko Kinoshita	JIP	Takashi Ōtsuka	LDP	67,055	40.6	4,533	Tomohiko Kinoshita	JIP	37.8	LDP gain from JIP
Osaka 9th	Yasushi Adachi	JIP	Kenji Harada	LDP	95,667	41.3	4,267	Yasushi Adachi	JIP	39.5	LDP gain from JIP
Osaka 10th	Kenta Matsunami	JIP	Kiyomi Tsujimoto	DPJ	61,725	34.3	8,565	Kazuhide Okuma	LDP	29.6	DPJ gain from JIP
Osaka 11th	Nobuhisa Ito	JIP	Yukari Sato	LDP	73,931	34.6	12,715	Hirofumi Hirano	DPJ	28.6	LDP gain from JIP
Osaka 12th	Tomokatsu Kitagawa	LDP	Tomokatsu Kitagawa	LDP	68,817	40.0	25,552	Shinji Tarutoko	DPJ	26.2	LDP hold
Osaka 13th	Koichi Nishino	PFG	Koichi Munekiyo	LDP	91,931	49.3	30,795	Koichi Nishino	PFG	32.8	LDP gain from PFG
Osaka 14th	Takashi Tanihata	JIP	Takashi Tanihata	JIP	78,332	38.8	1,777	Takashi Nagao	LDP	37.9	JIP hold
Osaka 15th	Yasuto Urano	JIP	Naokazu Takemoto	LDP	86,297	45.0	11,814	Yasuto Urano	JIP	38.9	LDP gain from JIP
Osaka 16th	Kazuo Kitagawa	Komei	Kazuo Kitagawa	Komei	66,673	43.2	28,342	Hiroyuki Moriyama	DPJ	24.8	Komei hold
Osaka 17th	Nobuyuki Baba	JIP	Nobuyuki Baba	JIP	70,196	43.7	6,977	Shohei Okashita	LDP	39.4	JIP hold
Osaka 18th	Takashi Endo	JIP	Takashi Endo	JIP	88,638	44.2	6,178	Noboru Kamitani	LDP	41.2	JIP hold
Osaka 19th	Hodaka Maruyama	JIP	Hodaka Maruyama	JIP	56,119	36.9	4,896	Tomu Tanigawa	LDP	33.7	JIP hold
Hyogo 1st	Masahito Moriyama	LDP	Nobuhiko Isaka	JIP	84,822	46.2	12,031	Masahito Moriyama	LDP	39.7	JIP gain from LDP
Hyogo 2nd	Kazuyoshi Akaba	Komei	Kazuyoshi Akaba	Komei	78,131	49.3	29,335	Koichi Mukoyama	DPJ	30.8	Komei hold
Hyogo 3rd	Yoshihiro Seki	LDP	Yoshihiro Seki	LDP	63,022	40.0	29,960	Hideto Shinbara	JIP	21.0	LDP hold
Hyogo 4th	Hisayuki Fujii	LDP	Hisayuki Fujii	LDP	111,544	54.7	49,038	Hisaya Nagai	JIP	30.6	LDP hold
Hyogo 5th	Koichi Tani	LDP	Koichi Tani	LDP	110,439	56.9	50,102	Kē Miki	JIP	31.1	LDP hold
Hyogo 6th	Masaki Ogushi	LDP	Masaki Ogushi	LDP	116,328	48.9	54,426	Yasuhiro Tsuji	DPJ	26.0	LDP hold
Hyogo 7th	Kenji Yamada	LDP	Kenji Yamada	LDP	89,813	36.9	25,957	Mitsunari Hatanaka	JIP	26.3	LDP hold
Hyogo 8th	Hiromasa Nakano	Komei	Hiromasa Nakano	Komei	94,687	60.9	33,838	Etsuko Shomoto	JCP	39.1	Komei hold
Hyogo 9th	Yasutoshi Nishimura	LDP	Yasutoshi Nishimura	LDP	126,491	74.8	83,797	Michiyo Shinmachi	JCP	25.2	LDP hold
Hyogo 10th	Kisaburo Tokai	LDP	Kisaburo Tokai	LDP	89,792	54.3	38,486	Masahiro Matsui	JIP	31.0	LDP hold
Hyogo 11th	Takeaki Matsumoto	DPJ	Takeaki Matsumoto	DPJ	90,182	49.6	15,620	Nobuhide Zushi	LDP	41.0	DPJ hold
Hyogo 12th	Tsuyoshi Yamaguchi	Ind.	Tsuyoshi Yamaguchi	Ind.	77,654	47.6	34,990	Shintaro Toida	Ind.	26.2	Ind. hold
Nara 1st	Sumio Mabuchi	DPJ	Sumio Mabuchi	DPJ	79,265	48.4	11,792	Shigeki Kobayashi	LDP	41.2	DPJ hold
Nara 2nd	Sanae Takaichi	LDP	Sanae Takaichi	LDP	96,218	61.3	57,437	Tetsuji Nakamura	PLP	24.7	LDP hold
Nara 3rd	Shinsuke Okuno	LDP	Shinsuke Okuno	LDP	79,334	52.6	32,778	Eriko Kurihara	JIP	30.9	LDP hold
Nara 4th	Taido Tanose	LDP	Taido Tanose	LDP	86,442	61.2	44,392	Takanori Onishi	DPJ	29.8	LDP hold
Wakayama 1st	Shūhei Kishimoto	DPJ	Shūhei Kishimoto	DPJ	67,740	47.8	7,803	Hirofumi Kado	LDP	42.3	DPJ hold
Wakayama 2nd	Masatoshi Ishida	LDP	Masatoshi Ishida	LDP	71,167	56.3	31,368	Naoto Sakaguchi	JIP	31.5	LDP hold
Wakayama 3rd	Toshihiro Nikai	LDP	Toshihiro Nikai	LDP	108,257	76.5	74,997	Yasuhisa Hara	JCP	23.5	LDP hold

Proportional representation results
Party	Votes	Seats	Rank	Elected member	Constituency	Ratio
LDP	2,442,006 (28.9%)	9	1	Takashi Nagao	Osaka 14th	97.7%
LDP	2,442,006 (28.9%)	9	1	Hiroyuki Onishi	Osaka 1st	95.5%
LDP	2,442,006 (28.9%)	9	1	Noboru Kamitani	Osaka 18th	93.0%
LDP	2,442,006 (28.9%)	9	1	Hiroshi Ando	Kyoto 6th	92.9%
LDP	2,442,006 (28.9%)	9	1	Tomu Tanigawa	Osaka 19th	91.3%
LDP	2,442,006 (28.9%)	9	1	Shohei Okashita	Osaka 17th	90.1%
LDP	2,442,006 (28.9%)	9	1	Hirofumi Kado	Wakayama 1st	88.5%
LDP	2,442,006 (28.9%)	9	1	Kazuhide Okuma	Osaka 10th	86.1%
LDP	2,442,006 (28.9%)	9	1	Masahito Moriyama	Hyogo 1st	85.8%
JIP	2,202,932 (26.1%)	8	1	Sakihito Ozawa		
JIP	2,202,932 (26.1%)	8	2	Yasushi Adachi	Osaka 9th	95.5%
JIP	2,202,932 (26.1%)	8	2	Tomohiko Kinoshita	Osaka 8th	93.2%
JIP	2,202,932 (26.1%)	8	2	Hirofumi Yoshimura	Osaka 4th	89.8%
JIP	2,202,932 (26.1%)	8	2	Yasuto Urano	Osaka 15th	86.3%
JIP	2,202,932 (26.1%)	8	2	Sayuri Uenishi	Osaka 7th	83.5%
JIP	2,202,932 (26.1%)	8	2	Kenta Matsunami	Osaka 10th	81.8%
JIP	2,202,932 (26.1%)	8	2	Nobuhisa Ito	Osaka 11th	78.9%
Komei	1,236,217 (14.6%)	4	1	Yuzuru Takeuchi		
Komei	1,236,217 (14.6%)	4	2	Tomoko Ukishima		
Komei	1,236,217 (14.6%)	4	3	Naoya Higuchi		
Komei	1,236,217 (14.6%)	4	4	Susumu Hamamura		
JCP	1,084,154 (12.8%)	4	1	Keiji Kokuta	Kyoto 1st	72.4%
JCP	1,084,154 (12.8%)	4	2	Takeshi Miyamoto		
JCP	1,084,154 (12.8%)	4	3	Tadashi Shimizu	Osaka 4th	38.1%
JCP	1,084,154 (12.8%)	4	4	Terufumi Horiuchi		
DPJ	1,047,361 (12.4%)	4	1	Kenta Izumi	Kyoto 3rd	92.4%
DPJ	1,047,361 (12.4%)	4	1	Tatsuo Kawabata	Shiga 1st	88.5%
DPJ	1,047,361 (12.4%)	4	1	Issei Tajima	Shiga 2nd	83.1%
DPJ	1,047,361 (12.4%)	4	1	Hirofumi Hirano	Osaka 11th	82.8%

== Chugoku block ==
2014 Japanese general election in Chugoku
- 14 December 2014

All 31 seats to the House of Representatives
	Majority party	Minority party	Third party
Party	LDP	DPJ	Komeito
Last election	23 seats	2 seats	2 seats
Constituency	18	0	0
PR seats	5	2	2
Total	23	2	2
Seat change	0	0	0
	Fourth party	Fifth party	Sixth party
Party	JIP	JCP	PFG
Last election	3 seats	0 seats	New
Constituency	0	0	1
PR seats	1	1	0
Total	1	1	1
Seat change	▼2	▲1	▲1
	Seventh party
Party	Ind.
Last election	0 seats
Constituency	1
PR seats	–
Total	1
Seat change	▲1

Single-member constituency results in Chugoku
Constituency	Previous member		Elected member		Votes	%	Margin	Runner-up		%	Status
Tottori 1st	Shigeru Ishiba	LDP	Shigeru Ishiba	LDP	93,105	80.3	70,217	Naruyuki Tsukada	JCP	19.7	LDP hold
Tottori 2nd	Ryosei Akazawa	LDP	Ryosei Akazawa	LDP	76,579	56.2	27,282	Shunji Yuhara	DPJ	36.2	LDP hold
Shimane 1st	Hiroyuki Hosoda	LDP	Hiroyuki Hosoda	LDP	100,376	64.3	62,030	Shoichiro Wada	DPJ	24.5	LDP hold
Shimane 2nd	Wataru Takeshita	LDP	Wataru Takeshita	LDP	123,584	69.2	89,026	Homaru Yamamoto	SDP	19.3	LDP hold
Okayama 1st	Ichiro Aisawa	LDP	Ichiro Aisawa	LDP	90,059	55.8	33,924	Takashi Takai	JIP	34.8	LDP hold
Okayama 2nd	Takashi Yamashita	LDP	Takashi Yamashita	LDP	71,436	49.6	14,485	Keisuke Tsumura	DPJ	39.5	LDP hold
Okayama 3rd	Takeo Hiranuma	PFG	Takeo Hiranuma	PFG	73,852	49.2	16,205	Toshiko Abe	LDP	38.4	PFG hold
Okayama 4th	Gaku Hashimoto	LDP	Gaku Hashimoto	LDP	91,189	50.6	15,851	Michiyoshi Yunoki	DPJ	41.8	LDP hold
Okayama 5th	Katsunobu Katō	LDP	Katsunobu Katō	LDP	105,969	79.3	78,276	Yoshiaki Miimi	JCP	20.7	LDP hold
Hiroshima 1st	Fumio Kishida	LDP	Fumio Kishida	LDP	96,236	65.7	70,784	Rika Shirasaka	JIP	17.4	LDP hold
Hiroshima 2nd	Hiroshi Hiraguchi	LDP	Hiroshi Hiraguchi	LDP	102,719	52.2	25,485	Daisuke Matsumoto	DPJ	39.3	LDP hold
Hiroshima 3rd	Katsuyuki Kawai	LDP	Katsuyuki Kawai	LDP	85,311	50.7	18,762	Hiroaki Hashimoto	DPJ	39.5	LDP hold
Hiroshima 4th	Toshinao Nakagawa	LDP	Toshinao Nakagawa	LDP	89,748	64.9	62,771	Hiromu Nakamaru	PFG	19.5	LDP hold
Hiroshima 5th	Minoru Terada	LDP	Minoru Terada	LDP	95,526	77.7	68,120	Hikaru Ozaki	JCP	22.3	LDP hold
Hiroshima 6th	Shizuka Kamei	Ind.	Shizuka Kamei	Ind.	89,756	52.2	24,262	Toshifumi Kojima	LDP	38.1	Ind. hold
Hiroshima 7th	Fumiaki Kobayashi	LDP	Fumiaki Kobayashi	LDP	101,809	58.2	61,809	Kyoko Murata	DPJ	22.9	LDP hold
Yamaguchi 1st	Masahiko Kōmura	LDP	Masahiko Kōmura	LDP	120,084	68.1	80,709	Tsutomu Takamura	JIP	22.3	LDP hold
Yamaguchi 2nd	Nobuo Kishi	LDP	Nobuo Kishi	LDP	96,799	58.4	38,985	Hideo Hiraoka	DPJ	34.9	LDP hold
Yamaguchi 3rd	Takeo Kawamura	LDP	Takeo Kawamura	LDP	93,248	68.4	63,919	Noboru Miura	DPJ	21.5	LDP hold
Yamaguchi 4th	Shinzo Abe	LDP	Shinzo Abe	LDP	100,829	76.3	83,471	Sadayoshi Yoshida	JCP	13.1	LDP hold

Proportional representation results
Party	Votes	Seats	Rank	Elected member	Constituency	Ratio
LDP	1,183,903 (38.2%)	5	1	Toshiko Abe	Okayama 3rd	78.1%
LDP	1,183,903 (38.2%)	5	1	Toshifumi Kojima	Hiroshima 6th	73.0%
LDP	1,183,903 (38.2%)	5	20	Masayoshi Shintani		
LDP	1,183,903 (38.2%)	5	21	Michitaka Ikeda		
LDP	1,183,903 (38.2%)	5	22	Keiichi Furuta		
DPJ	529,819 (17.1%)	2	1	Michiyoshi Yunoki	Okayama 4th	82.6%
DPJ	529,819 (17.1%)	2	1	Keisuke Tsumura	Okayama 2nd	79.7%
Komei	516,892 (16.7%)	2	1	Tetsuo Saito		
Komei	516,892 (16.7%)	2	2	Keigo Masuya		
JIP	394,306 (12.7%)	1	1	Takashi Takai	Okayama 1st	62.3%
JCP	285,224 (9.2%)	1	1	Yoshinobu Ohira		

== Shikoku block ==
2014 Japanese general election in Shikoku
- 14 December 2014

All 17 seats to the House of Representatives
	Majority party	Minority party
Party	LDP	DPJ
Last election	14 seats	2 seats
Constituency	10	1
PR seats	3	1
Total	13	2
Seat change	▼1	0
	Third party	Fourth party
Party	Komeito	JIP
Last election	1 seat	2 seats
Constituency	0	0
PR seats	1	1
Total	1	1
Seat change	0	▼1

Single-member constituency results in Shikoku
Constituency	Previous member		Elected member		Votes	%	Margin	Runner-up		%	Status
Tokushima 1st	Mamoru Fukuyama	LDP	Masazumi Gotoda	LDP	92,166	52.0	22,978	Hirobumi Niki	DPJ	39.1	LDP hold
Tokushima 2nd	Shunichi Yamaguchi	LDP	Shunichi Yamaguchi	LDP	85,979	74.1	55,983	Takayuki Kubo	JCP	25.9	LDP hold
Tokushima 3rd	Masazumi Gotoda	LDP	Seat abolished								LDP loss
Kagawa 1st	Takuya Hirai	LDP	Takuya Hirai	LDP	74,115	49.5	8,305	Junya Ogawa	DPJ	43.9	LDP hold
Kagawa 2nd	Yuichiro Tamaki	DPJ	Yuichiro Tamaki	DPJ	78,797	55.8	21,479	Takakazu Seto	LDP	40.6	DPJ hold
Kagawa 3rd	Keitaro Ohno	LDP	Keitaro Ohno	LDP	76,281	68.2	50,382	Yoshinori Takata	SDP	23.2	LDP hold
Ehime 1st	Yasuhisa Shiozaki	LDP	Yasuhisa Shiozaki	LDP	99,900	53.6	25,392	Takako Nagae	DPJ	40.0	LDP hold
Ehime 2nd	Seiichiro Murakami	LDP	Seiichiro Murakami	LDP	57,168	48.0	26,891	Arata Nishioka	Ind.	25.4	LDP hold
Ehime 3rd	Toru Shiraishi	LDP	Toru Shiraishi	LDP	64,929	51.7	12,327	Yoichi Shiraishi	DPJ	41.8	LDP hold
Ehime 4th	Koichi Yamamoto	LDP	Koichi Yamamoto	LDP	66,954	47.1	19,317	Fumiki Sakurauchi	PFG	33.5	LDP hold
Kochi 1st	Teru Fukui	LDP	Gen Nakatani	LDP	78,279	51.9	40,042	Shu Oishi	DPJ	25.4	LDP hold
Kochi 2nd	Gen Nakatani	LDP	Yūji Yamamoto	LDP	83,764	53.6	41,202	Norio Takeuchi	DPJ	27.2	LDP hold
Kochi 3rd	Yūji Yamamoto	LDP	Seat abolished								LDP loss

Proportional representation results
Party	Votes	Seats	Rank	Elected member	Constituency	Ratio
LDP	547,185 (34.9%)	3	1	Teru Fukui		
LDP	547,185 (34.9%)	3	2	Mamoru Fukuyama		
LDP	547,185 (34.9%)	3	3	Takakazu Seto	Kagawa 2nd	72.7%
DPJ	326,803 (20.8%)	1	1	Junya Ogawa	Kagawa 1st	88.8%
Komei	247,776 (15.8%)	1	1	Noritoshi Ishida		
JIP	200,882 (12.8%)	1	1	Hiroyuki Yokoyama	Ehime 2nd	39.7%

== Kyushu block ==
2014 Japanese general election in Kyushu
- 14 December 2014

All 58 seats to the House of Representatives
	Majority party	Minority party	Third party
Party	LDP	DPJ	Komeito
Last election	41 seats	3 seats	3 seats
Constituency	28	2	0
PR seats	8	3	4
Total	36	5	4
Seat change	▼5	▲2	▲1
	Fourth party	Fifth party	Sixth party
Party	JIP	JCP	SDP
Last election	5 seats	1 seats	2 seats
Constituency	0	1	1
PR seats	3	2	1
Total	3	3	2
Seat change	▼2	▲2	0
	Seventh party	Eighth party	Ninth party
Party	PFG	PLP	Ind.
Last election	New	1 seat	1 seat
Constituency	1	1	3
PR seats	0	0	–
Total	1	1	3
Seat change	▲1	0	▲2

Single-member constituency results in Kyushu
Constituency	Previous member		Elected member		Votes	%	Margin	Runner-up		%	Status
Fukuoka 1st	Takahiro Inoue	Ind.	Takahiro Inoue	Ind.	59,712	36.3	16,752	Gōsei Yamamoto	DPJ	26.1	Ind. hold
Fukuoka 2nd	Makoto Oniki	LDP	Makoto Oniki	LDP	102,241	49.5	18,706	Shuji Inatomi	DPJ	40.4	LDP hold
Fukuoka 3rd	Atsushi Koga	LDP	Atsushi Koga	LDP	114,093	57.4	48,698	Kazue Fujita	DPJ	32.9	LDP hold
Fukuoka 4th	Hideki Miyauchi	LDP	Hideki Miyauchi	LDP	91,222	53.9	36,559	Masami Kawano	JIP	32.3	LDP hold
Fukuoka 5th	Yoshiaki Harada	LDP	Yoshiaki Harada	LDP	113,736	54.5	39,931	Daizo Kusuda	DPJ	35.3	LDP hold
Fukuoka 6th	Kunio Hatoyama	LDP	Kunio Hatoyama	LDP	116,413	72.0	71,056	Mutsumi Kaneko	JCP	28.0	LDP hold
Fukuoka 7th	Satoshi Fujimaru	LDP	Satoshi Fujimaru	LDP	95,796	70.5	55,793	Manabu Eguchi	JCP	29.5	LDP hold
Fukuoka 8th	Tarō Asō	LDP	Tarō Asō	LDP	126,684	71.3	75,737	Shoko Kawano	JCP	28.7	LDP hold
Fukuoka 9th	Asahiko Mihara	LDP	Asahiko Mihara	LDP	87,892	47.2	16,021	Rintaro Ogata	DPJ	38.6	LDP hold
Fukuoka 10th	Kozo Yamamoto	LDP	Kozo Yamamoto	LDP	81,567	44.2	22,968	Takashi Kii	DPJ	31.8	LDP hold
Fukuoka 11th	Ryota Takeda	LDP	Ryota Takeda	LDP	85,488	65.6	61,350	Hiroyuki Fujinaka	SDP	18.5	LDP hold
Saga 1st	Kazuchika Iwata	LDP	Kazuhiro Haraguchi	DPJ	85,903	47.5	2,482	Kazuchika Iwata	LDP	46.1	DPJ gain from LDP
Saga 2nd	Masahiro Imamura	LDP	Yasushi Furukawa	LDP	114,074	55.6	31,691	Hiroshi Ogushi	DPJ	40.1	LDP hold
Saga 3rd	Kosuke Hori	LDP	Seat abolished								LDP loss
Nagasaki 1st	Tsutomu Tomioka	LDP	Tsutomu Tomioka	LDP	76,247	45.6	2,029	Yoshiaki Takaki	DPJ	44.4	LDP hold
Nagasaki 2nd	Kanji Kato	LDP	Kanji Kato	LDP	86,359	52.8	20,435	Yukishige Okubo	DPJ	40.3	LDP hold
Nagasaki 3rd	Yaichi Tanigawa	LDP	Yaichi Tanigawa	LDP	82,354	72.2	50,704	Kanji Ishimaru	JCP	27.8	LDP hold
Nagasaki 4th	Seigo Kitamura	LDP	Seigo Kitamura	LDP	61,533	50.4	18,843	Daisuke Miyajima	DPJ	35.0	LDP hold
Kumamoto 1st	Minoru Kihara	LDP	Minoru Kihara	LDP	87,111	49.7	13,837	Yorihisa Matsuno	JIP	41.8	LDP hold
Kumamoto 2nd	Takeshi Noda	LDP	Takeshi Noda	LDP	92,873	71.6	56,104	Yumi Hirose	JCP	28.4	LDP hold
Kumamoto 3rd	Tetsushi Sakamoto	LDP	Tetsushi Sakamoto	LDP	100,824	77.1	70,843	Yoshiya Imou	JCP	22.9	LDP hold
Kumamoto 4th	Hiroyuki Sonoda	PFG	Hiroyuki Sonoda	PFG	101,581	75.9	69,358	Eiji Iseri	JCP	24.1	PFG hold
Kumamoto 5th	Yasushi Kaneko	LDP	Yasushi Kaneko	LDP	87,874	69.5	61,629	Katsumi Imaizumi	SDP	20.8	LDP hold
Oita 1st	Yoichi Anami	LDP	Shuji Kira	DPJ	94,893	48.3	6,386	Yoichi Anami	LDP	45.0	DPJ gain from LDP
Oita 2nd	Seishirō Etō	LDP	Seishirō Etō	LDP	86,363	52.6	26,588	Hajime Yoshikawa	SDP	36.4	LDP hold
Oita 3rd	Takeshi Iwaya	LDP	Takeshi Iwaya	LDP	106,257	61.7	57,868	Hideki Urano	DPJ	28.1	LDP hold
Miyazaki 1st	Shunsuke Takei	LDP	Shunsuke Takei	LDP	89,171	54.2	49,777	Itsuki Toyama	JIP	23.9	LDP hold
Miyazaki 2nd	Taku Etō	LDP	Taku Etō	LDP	111,850	78.4	81,009	Takayuki Yoshida	JCP	21.6	LDP hold
Miyazaki 3rd	Yoshihisa Furukawa	LDP	Yoshihisa Furukawa	LDP	108,051	78.5	78,452	Kazuhito Raiju	JCP	21.5	LDP hold
Kagoshima 1st	Okiharu Yasuoka	LDP	Okiharu Yasuoka	LDP	67,376	44.1	20,061	Hiroshi Kawauchi	DPJ	31.0	LDP hold
Kagoshima 2nd	Masuo Kaneko	LDP	Masuo Kaneko	LDP	91,670	74.2	59,847	Mitsuharu Iwaizako	JCP	25.8	LDP hold
Kagoshima 3rd	Takeshi Noma	Ind.	Takeshi Noma	Ind.	79,003	54.6	22,262	Kazuaki Miyaji	LDP	39.2	Ind. hold
Kagoshima 4th	Yasuhiro Ozato	LDP	Yasuhiro Ozato	LDP	93,501	69.6	65,220	Noro Masakazu	SDP	21.1	LDP hold
Kagoshima 5th	Hiroshi Moriyama	LDP	Hiroshi Moriyama	LDP	94,977	79.1	69,809	Hiroshi Noguchi	JCP	20.9	LDP hold
Okinawa 1st	Konosuke Kokuba	LDP	Seiken Akamine	JCP	57,935	39.8	4,694	Konosuke Kokuba	LDP	36.6	JCP gain from LDP
Okinawa 2nd	Kantoku Teruya	SDP	Kantoku Teruya	SDP	85,781	62.2	33,625	Masahisa Miyazaki	LDP	37.8	SDP hold
Okinawa 3rd	Natsumi Higa	LDP	Denny Tamaki	PLP	89,110	60.0	29,619	Natsumi Higa	LDP	40.0	PLP gain from LDP
Okinawa 4th	Kosaburo Nishime	LDP	Toshinobu Nakasato	Ind.	71,227	52.0	5,389	Kosaburo Nishime	LDP	48.0	Ind. gain from LDP

Proportional representation results
Party	Votes	Seats	Rank	Elected member	Constituency	Ratio
LDP	2,001,264 (34.3%)	8	1	Kazuchika Iwata	Saga 1st	97.1%
LDP	2,001,264 (34.3%)	8	1	Yoichi Anami	Oita 1st	93.3%
LDP	2,001,264 (34.3%)	8	1	Kosaburo Nishime	Okinawa 4th	92.4%
LDP	2,001,264 (34.3%)	8	1	Konosuke Kokuba	Okinawa 1st	91.9%
LDP	2,001,264 (34.3%)	8	1	Kazuaki Miyaji	Kagoshima 3rd	71.8%
LDP	2,001,264 (34.3%)	8	1	Natsumi Higa	Okinawa 3rd	66.8%
LDP	2,001,264 (34.3%)	8	1	Masahisa Miyazaki	Okinawa 2nd	60.8%
LDP	2,001,264 (34.3%)	8	31	Masahiro Imamura		
Komei	1,033,424 (17.7%)	4	1	Yasuyuki Eda		
Komei	1,033,424 (17.7%)	4	2	Kiyohiko Toyama		
Komei	1,033,424 (17.7%)	4	3	Masakazu Hamachi		
Komei	1,033,424 (17.7%)	4	4	Nobuhiro Yoshida		
DPJ	944,093 (16.2%)	3	1	Hiroshi Ogushi	Saga 2nd	72.2%
DPJ	944,093 (16.2%)	3	1	Yoshiaki Takaki	Nagasaki 1st	97.3%
DPJ	944,093 (16.2%)	3	1	Rintaro Ogata	Fukuoka 9th	81.8%
JIP	756,029 (13.0%)	3	1	Yorihisa Matsuno	Kumamoto 1st	84.1%
JIP	756,029 (13.0%)	3	1	Masami Kawano	Fukuoka 4th	59.9%
JIP	756,029 (13.0%)	3	1	Mikio Shimoji	Okinawa 1st	59.3%
JCP	532,454 (9.1%)	2	2	Takaaki Tamura		
JCP	532,454 (9.1%)	2	3	Shozo Majima	Fukuoka 9th	30.1%
SDP	306,935 (5.3%)	1	1	Hajime Yoshikawa	Oita 2nd	69.2%

== Leaders' races ==
Results for party leaders
Party	Member	Constituency	Votes	%	Position	Status
LDP	Shinzo Abe	Yamaguchi 4th	100,829	76.3	1st	Re-elected
DPJ	Banri Kaieda	Tokyo 1st	89,232	35.6	2nd	Defeated
JIP	Tōru Hashimoto	Mayor of Osaka				
JIP	Kenji Eda	Kanagawa 8th	116,189	54.5	1st	Re-elected
Komei	Natsuo Yamaguchi	House of Councillors				
JCP	Kazuo Shii	Southern Kanto PR	813,634	11.9	1st	Re-elected
PFG	Takeo Hiranuma	Okayama 3rd	73,852	49.2	1st	Re-elected
SDP	Tadatomo Yoshida	House of Councillors				
PLP	Ichirō Ozawa	Iwate 4th	75,293	47.8	1st	Re-elected

== Closest races ==
Candidates with a narrow loss ratio of over 90%
Constituency	Candidate		Votes	%	Ratio
Niigata 2nd	Eiichiro Washio	DPJ	70,487	42.9	99.9
Hokkaido 7th	Takako Suzuki	DPJ	72,056	45.7	99.7
Tochigi 2nd	Koya Nishikawa	LDP	62,240	46.5	99.7
Fukushima 4th	Ichirō Kanke	LDP	56,440	42.5	99.3
Kanagawa 12th	Tomoko Abe	TPJ	82,612	42.1	99.1
Yamanashi 1st	Noriko Miyagawa	LDP	101,026	43.5	98.9
Kanagawa 16th	Hiroyuki Yoshiie	LDP	101,627	45.2	98.6
Yamagata 3rd	Juichi Abe	Ind.	78,384	42.1	98.1
Tokyo 21st	Akihisa Nagashima	DPJ	82,351	40.8	98.1
Osaka 14th	Takashi Nagao	LDP	76,555	37.9	97.7
Hokkaido 6th	Hiroshi Imazu	LDP	101,748	44.0	97.3
Nagasaki 1st	Yoshiaki Takaki	DPJ	74,218	44.4	97.3
Saga 1st	Kazuchika Iwata	LDP	83,421	46.1	97.1
Tokyo 15th	Tsukasa Akimoto	LDP	85,714	40.0	96.8
Tokyo 3rd	Jin Matsubara	DPJ	111,353	42.6	96.3
Saitama 5th	Hideki Makihara	LDP	86,636	44.4	96.2
Niigata 4th	Makiko Kikuta	DPJ	74,073	44.8	96.0
Osaka 1st	Hiroyuki Onishi	LDP	71,648	40.5	95.5
Osaka 9th	Yasushi Adachi	JIP	91,400	39.5	95.5
Aichi 7th	Junji Suzuki	LDP	108,151	44.4	95.3
Fukushima 1st	Emi Kaneko	DPJ	97,630	44.9	94.9
Aomori 1st	Sekio Masuta	JIP	62,254	42.5	94.3
Akita 3rd	Toshihide Muraoka	JIP	88,483	44.9	94.0
Hokkaido 8th	Kazuo Maeda	LDP	91,351	44.2	93.5
Oita 1st	Yoichi Anami	LDP	88,507	45.0	93.3
Osaka 8th	Tomohiko Kinoshita	JIP	62,522	37.8	93.2
Kanagawa 9th	Norihiro Nakayama	LDP	59,991	35.2	93.0
Osaka 18th	Noboru Kamitani	LDP	82,460	41.2	93.0
Kyoto 6th	Hiroshi Ando	LDP	94,736	41.1	92.9
Hokkaido 3rd	Satoshi Arai	DPJ	85,591	36.5	92.4
Kyoto 3rd	Kenta Izumi	DPJ	54,900	33.1	92.4
Okinawa 4th	Kosaburo Nishime	LDP	65,838	48.0	92.4
Yamagata 2nd	Yōsuke Kondō	DPJ	90,420	45.3	92.3
Okinawa 1st	Konosuke Kokuba	LDP	53,241	36.6	91.9
Niigata 1st	Chinami Nishimura	DPJ	84,573	42.9	91.3
Osaka 19th	Tomu Tanigawa	LDP	51,223	33.7	91.3
Hokkaido 1st	Toshimitsu Funabashi	LDP	105,918	39.6	91.0
Ishikawa 3rd	Kazuya Kondo	DPJ	64,940	45.1	91.0
Chiba 1st	Hiroaki Kadoyama	LDP	76,937	37.3	90.8
Saitama 6th	Kazuyuki Nakane	LDP	94,303	41.9	90.7
Aichi 8th	Yutaka Banno	DPJ	99,058	42.9	90.3
Hokkaido 4th	Yoshio Hachiro	DPJ	70,049	40.9	90.2
Osaka 17th	Shohei Okashita	LDP	63,219	39.4	90.1
