= Results of the 2012 Japanese general election (Shikoku proportional representation block) =

The Shikoku proportional representation block was one of 11 multi-member districts (and 311 districts overall) that were contested at the general election for the House of Representatives in the Japanese National Diet on 16 December 2012. Six seats were available for election via open party lists. The Liberal Democratic Party (LDP) won the election in a landslide, which returned former Prime Minister Shinzo Abe to power. In the Shikoku PR block, the LDP won two of the six seats with 30.7% of the vote.

Voters who participated in the election cast one ballot for the proportional block and a separate ballot for one of the 13 smaller single-member districts that are located within Shikoku.

== Results ==
Prior to the election, the ruling Democratic Party of Japan (DPJ) held three of the six PR block seats as well as 5 of the 13 small electorates that make up the block. The opposition LDP held 2 of the PR seats and the 8 remaining electorates, while their traditional junior coalition partner Komeito held the final PR seat.

The 2012 general election delivered a landslide victory to the LDP, with 294 of the 480 seats won at the national level. The election decimated the DPJ from a pre-election position of 230 to just 57 seats. In the Shikoku PR block, the DPJ lost 2 of their seats as their vote was reduced to 16.0%, down from 43.2% in the 2009 election. Junya Ogawa lost his seat in Kagawa 1st district but was the DPJ candidate to suffer the narrowest defeat, so he was able to retain a seta in the house. The newly-formed Japan Restoration Party gained the two seats lost by the DPJ. In the 13 single-member electorates, the LDP gained 4 seats, with Yuichiro Tamaki being the only DPJ member to retain his seat in the Kagawa 2nd district.

Elected candidates
Party	Representative	Party rank	Term #
LDP	Takakazu Seto	1	1st
Restoration	Fumiki Sakurauchi	1	1st
DPJ	Junya Ogawa	1	3rd
LDP	Yasuji Izuhara	14	2nd
Komeito	Noritoshi Ishida	1	6th
Restoration	Arata Nishioka	1	1st

Party	Votes	%	Seats	+/–
Liberal Democratic Party	567,193	30.66	2	0
Japan Restoration Party	394,393	21.32	2	New
Democratic Party of Japan	296,914	16.05	1	–2
Komeito	276,907	14.97	1	0
Japanese Communist Party	106,976	5.78	0	0
Your Party	93,090	5.03	0	New
Tomorrow Party of Japan	63,830	3.45	0	New
Social Democratic Party	42,762	2.31	0	0
Happiness Realization Party	8,171	0.44	0	0
Total	1,850,236	100.00	6	0
Valid votes	1,850,236	96.94		
Invalid/blank votes	58,365	3.06		
Total votes	1,908,601	100.00		
Registered voters/turnout	3,291,313	57.99		
Source: Ministry of Internal Affairs and Communications

== Party lists ==
=== Liberal Democratic Party ===
	Liberal Democratic Party		Number of votes: 567,193		Percentage of votes: 30.7%	Number of seats won: 2
Rank	Name	Incumbency	District contested	Loss ratio (Sekihairitsu)	Result	Notes
1	Takakazu Seto		Kagawa 2nd district	91.0	✓ Elected to block	
1	Mamoru Fukuyama		Tokushima 1st district	—N/a	✓ Won Tokushima 1st district	
1	Shunichi Yamaguchi	Shikoku proportional representation block	Tokushima 2nd district	—N/a	✓ Won Tokushima 2nd district	
1	Masazumi Gotoda	Tokushima 3rd district	Tokushima 3rd district	—N/a	✓ Won Tokushima 3rd district	
1	Takuya Hirai	Shikoku proportional representation block	Kagawa 1st district	—N/a	✓ Won Kagawa 1st district	
1	Keitaro Ono		Kagawa 3rd district	—N/a	✓ Won Kagawa 3rd district	
1	Yasuhisa Shiozaki	Ehime 1st district	Ehime 1st district	—N/a	✓ Won Ehime 1st district	
1	Seiichiro Murakami	Ehime 2nd district	Ehime 2nd district	—N/a	✓ Won Ehime 2nd district	
1	Toru Shiraishi		Ehime 3rd district	—N/a	✓ Won Ehime 3rd district	
1	Koichi Yamamoto	Ehime 4th district	Ehime 4th district	—N/a	✓ Won Ehime 4th district	
1	Teru Fukui	Kochi 1st district	Kochi 1st district	—N/a	✓ Won Kochi 1st district	
1	Gen Nakatani	Kochi 2nd district	Kochi 2nd district	—N/a	✓ Won Kochi 2nd district	
1	Yuji Yamamoto	Kochi 3rd district	Kochi 3rd district	—N/a	✓ Won Kochi 3rd district	
14	Yasuji Izuhara				✓ Elected to block	Former Kinki PR block representative
15	Ichiro Nagai					
16	Naka Takahashi					
17	Toshinori Matsuzaki					
18	Reiko Shinozaki					

=== Democratic Party of Japan ===
	Democratic Party of Japan		Number of votes: 296,914		Percentage of votes: 16.0%	Number of seats won: 1
Rank	Name	Incumbency	District contested	Loss ratio (Sekihairitsu)	Result	Notes
1	Junya Ogawa	Kagawa 1st district	Kagawa 1st district	75.0	✓ Elected to block	
1	Hirobumi Niki	Shikoku proportional representation block	Tokushima 3rd district	72.3	✗ Lost seat	
1	Yoshito Sengoku	Tokushima 1st district	Tokushima 1st district	66.5	✗ Lost seat	
1	Miho Takai	Tokushima 2nd district	Tokushima 2nd district	65.6	✗ Lost seat	
1	Yoichi Shiraishi	Ehime 3rd district	Ehime 3rd district	60.1	✗ Lost seat	
1	Shu Oishi		Kochi 1st district	58.9		
1	Hideyuki Takahashi	Shikoku proportional representation block	Ehime 4th district	46.1	✗ Lost seat	
1	Takako Nagae	Shikoku proportional representation block	Ehime 1st district	42.6	✗ Lost seat	
1	Yuichiro Tamaki	Kagawa 2nd district	Kagawa 2nd district	—N/a	✓ Won Kagawa 2nd district	

=== Japan Restoration Party ===
	Japan Restoration Party		Number of votes: 394,393		Percentage of votes: 21.3%	Number of seats won: 2
Rank	Name	Incumbency	District contested	Loss ratio (Sekihairitsu)	Result	Notes
1	Fumiki Sakurauchi		Ehime 4th district	78.2	✓ Elected to block	Former House of Councillors member
1	Arata Nishioka		Ehime 2nd district	63.2	✓ Elected to block	
1	Natsue Mori		Ehime 3rd district	41.8		
1	Toshihide Ikemoto		Ehime 1st district	41.5		
5	Shinya Fujimura		Kochi 1st district	37.0		
5	Eiji Imanishi		Kagawa 1st district	23.9		Former Hyogo Prefectural Assembly member
7	Junji Ouchi					

=== Komeito ===
	Komeito		Number of votes: 276,907		Percentage of votes: 15.0%	Number of seats won: 1
Rank	Name	Incumbency	District contested	Loss ratio (Sekihairitsu)	Result	Notes
1	Noritoshi Ishida	Shikoku proportional representation block			✓ Elected to block	
2	Shinichi Tsukiyama					

=== Japanese Communist Party ===
	Japanese Communist Party		Number of votes: 106,976		Percentage of votes: 5.8%	Number of seats won: 0
Rank	Name	Incumbency	District contested	Loss ratio (Sekihairitsu)	Result	Notes
1	Masaru Sasaoka					
2	Naoaki Haruna	(Former member)	Kochi 1st district			

=== Your Party ===
	Your Party		Number of votes: 93,090		Percentage of votes: 5.0%	Number of seats won: 0
Rank	Name	Incumbency	District contested	Loss ratio (Sekihairitsu)	Result	Notes
1	Teruaki Nakayama					

=== Tomorrow Party of Japan ===
	Tomorrow Party		Number of votes: 63,830		Percentage of votes: 3.4%	Number of seats won: 0
Rank	Name	Incumbency	District contested	Loss ratio (Sekihairitsu)	Result	Notes
1	Toshiro Tomochika		Ehime 2nd district			Former House of Councillors member
2	Yoko Washino					

=== Social Democratic Party ===
	Social Democratic Party		Number of votes: 42,762		Percentage of votes: 2.3%	Number of seats won: 0
Rank	Name	Incumbency	District contested	Loss ratio (Sekihairitsu)	Result	Notes
1	Haruhiko Maida		Kagawa 3rd district			

=== Happiness Realization Party ===
	Happiness Realization Party		Number of votes: 8,171		Percentage of votes: 0.4%	Number of seats won: 0
Rank	Name	Incumbency	District contested	Loss ratio (Sekihairitsu)	Result	Notes
1	Jikido Aeba					
2	Akemi Takeo					
