= Closed list =

Variant of party-list voting system

Closed list describes the variant of party-list systems where voters can effectively vote for only political parties as a whole; thus they have no influence on the party-supplied order in which party candidates are elected. If voters had some influence, that would be called an open list. Closed list systems are still commonly used in party-list proportional representation, and most mixed electoral systems also use closed lists in their party list component. Many countries, however have changed their electoral systems to use open lists to incorporate personalised representation to their proportional systems.

In closed list systems, each political party has pre-decided who will receive the seats allocated to that party in the elections, so that the candidates positioned highest on this list tend to always get a seat in the parliament while the candidates positioned very low on the closed list will not. However, the candidates "at the water mark" of a given party are in the position of either losing or winning their seat depending on the number of votes the party gets. "The water mark" is the number of seats a specific party can be expected to achieve. The number of seats that the party wins, combined with the candidates' positions on the party's list, will then determine whether a particular candidate will get a seat.

== List of countries using closed list systems ==
Countries using closed-lists as of 2022 in the electoral system of their legislature (unicameral, or lower chamber) Proportional representation: countries where all parties use a closed-list Proportional representation: countries where only some parties use a closed-list Mixed-member proportional systems with closed-lists Mixed-member majoritarian representation with closed-lists

=== Proportional representation ===
- Algeria
- Angola
- Argentina
- Armenia
- Benin
- Burkina Faso
- Burundi
- Cambodia
- Colombia (depending on the party)
- Costa Rica
- Dominican Republic
- Equatorial Guinea
- Germany
- Guatemala
- Guinea-Bissau
- Guyana
- Hong Kong (1997–2016)
- Israel
- Kazakhstan
- Kyrgyzstan
- Moldova
- Montenegro
- Morocco
- Mozambique
- Namibia
- Nicaragua
- Niger
- North Macedonia
- Norway
- Paraguay
- Portugal
- Romania
- Rwanda
- Serbia
- South Africa
- Spain
- Sri Lanka
- Timor-Leste
- Togo
- Tunisia
- Turkey
- Uruguay
- Wales

=== Mixed electoral systems ===
Mixed electoral system using closed lists for the proportional component

- Andorra
- Hungary
- Italy
- New Zealand (mixed-member proportional representation)
- Philippines
- Russia
- Scotland
- Taiwan

=== Majoritarian representation ===
Party block voting (general ticket) with a closed list

- (Ivory Coast) Côte d'Ivoire (party block voting in multi-member districts)
- Singapore (party block voting in multi-member districts)
- United States (electoral college)

== See also ==
- Ley de Lemas
- List of democracy and elections-related topics
- Sekihairitsu
- Zweitmandat
