= Kōchi at-large district (House of Representatives) =

Electoral district in Japan

The Kōchi at-large district (Japanese: 高知県全県区, Hepburn: Kōchi-ken Zenken-ku) was a multi-member electoral district represented in the House of Representatives in the National Diet of Japan. From 1947 until 1993, it elected five representatives from Kōchi Prefecture. Prime Minister Shigeru Yoshida was elected from the district during its first seven elections of its existence.

== History ==
In the 1947 Japanese general election, conservative parties won a majority of seats, with prime minister Shigeru Yoshida leading in the polls. Subsequently, they would continue winning majorities in the district, a trend that persisted after these parties merged to create the LDP until the 1967 Japanese general election. In the 1967 Japanese general election, the Kōmeitō ran in the district for the first time, winning in third-place. Afterwards, the party would win a seat from the district except in the 1972 Japanese general election, with Akira Nakano, Masatarō Hiraishi, and Noritoshi Ishida being the Kōmeitō's representatives for the district. Meanwhile, the LDP would win a majority of seats only twice: in 1969 and 1972. Due to the 1994 Japanese electoral reform, the at-large district was replaced with three single-member districts starting with the 1996 Japanese general election.

Among the district's representatives were Shigeru Yoshida, who was prime minister (1946–1947; 1948–1954) and was elected from the district during its first seven elections of its existence; Jōji Hayashi, who was Chief Cabinet Secretary (1947) and deputy prime minister (1948–1951); Gen Nakatani, who was Director-General of the Japan Defense Agency (2001–2002) and Minister of Defense (2014–2016); and Yūji Yamamoto, who was Minister of State for Financial Services (2006–2007) and Minister of Agriculture, Forestry, and Fisheries (2016–2017).

At the time the Public Offices Election Law came into law in 1950, the district encompassed the entirely of Kōchi Prefecture.

== Results ==
1947
Party	Candidate	Votes	%	±%
Liberal	Shigeru Yoshida	98,176	29.4	New
Liberal	Jōji Hayashi	49,926	14.9	New
Independent	Shigeharu Kuroiwa	40,172	12.0	New
Socialist	Haruki Satake	38,332	11.5	New
Democratic	Nagahiro Nagano	28,732	8.6	New
Other	Tsuneko Harakami	26,729	8.0	New
Socialist	Ichirō Ujihara	25,903	7.8	New
Democratic	Tosatarō Nagano	17,323	5.2	New
JCP	Kumaharu Kunisawa	8,721	2.6	New

1949
Party	Candidate	Votes	%	±%
Democratic Liberal	Shigeru Yoshida	81,289	22.9	New
Democratic Liberal	Jōji Hayashi	49,424	13.9	New
Democratic	Nagahiro Nagano	33,787	9.5	+0.9
Democratic	Masao Ōnishi	33,056	9.3	+4.1
Japan Social Reform Party	Haruki Satake	22,854	6.4	New
Independent	Takao Hamada	22,833	6.4	New
JCP	Masamitsu Okamoto	21,578	6.1	+3.5
Socialist	Ichirō Ujihara	20,680	5.8	−5.7
Independent	Mitsui Hamada	19,205	5.4	New
Independent	Shigeki Nishiyama	14,417	4.1	New
Japan Farmers Party (1947–1949)	Gonjirō Haragami	13,463	3.8	New
Labourers and Farmers	Tadashi Nishihara	12,766	3.6	New
Pure Japanese Youth Association	Masaru Kuroiwa	10,252	2.9	New

1952
Party	Candidate	Votes	%	±%
Liberal	Shigeru Yoshida	87,169	22.7	New
Liberal	Jōji Hayashi	65,371	17.0	New
Kaishintō	Kōichi Uda	46,286	12.0	New
Liberal	Takao Hamada	41,169	10.7	New
Liberal	Nagahiro Nagano	35,983	9.4	New
Japan Reconstruction Federation	Yoshiaki Yorimitsu	24,899	6.5	New
Japan Cooperative Party (1952)	Haruki Satake	22,392	5.8	New
Left Socialist	Yoshiyasu Irimajiri	22,027	5.7	New
Independent	Kenjirō Yamahara	18,276	4.8	New
Independent	Hisaki Nishimori	11,378	3.0	New
Other	Masaru Ōishi	9,592	2.5	New

1953
Party	Candidate	Votes	%	±%
Liberal	Shigeru Yoshida	88,620	24.0	+1.3
Liberal	Jōji Hayashi	63,916	17.3	+0.3
Right Socialist	Haruki Satake	61,022	16.5	New
Liberal	Nagahiro Nagano	54,022	14.6	+3.9
Liberal	Takao Hamada	50,469	13.6	+4.2
Kaishintō	Kōichi Uda	39,029	10.5	−1.5
JCP	Masaki Morita	8,573	2.3	New
Other	Keizo Konagai	4,322	1.2	New

1955
Party	Candidate	Votes	%	±%
Liberal	Shigeru Yoshida	52,962	14.1	−9.9
Democratic	Kōichi Uda	50,408	13.4	New
Right Socialist	Haruki Satake	46,486	12.3	−4.2
Left Socialist	Sei Morimoto	42,234	11.2	New
Liberal	Jōji Hayashi	38,897	10.3	−7.0
Kochi Prefectural Bereaved Families Association Federation	Naoyoshi Ueda	36,245	9.6	New
Liberal	Takao Hamada	35,823	9.5	−5.1
Liberal	Nagahiro Nagano	32,766	8.7	−4.9
Independent	Masao Ōnishi	22,486	6.0	New
Democratic	Yoshiaki Yorimitsu	16,739	4.4	New
Independent	Gonjirō Haragami	1,500	0.4	New

1958
Party	Candidate	Votes	%	±%
LDP	Jōji Hayashi	70,728	16.5	New
LDP	Takao Hamada	53,821.97	12.6	New
Socialist	Sei Morimoto	53,725	12.5	New
LDP	Shigeru Yoshida	52,286	12.2	New
LDP	Masanobu Hamada	46,129.43	10.8	New
Socialist	Takeyuki Takahashi	45,417	10.6	New
Independent	Yoshiaki Yorimitsu	35,961	8.4	New
Socialist	Haruki Satake	34,662	8.1	New
Independent	Wakaji Kawamura	17,040	4.0	New
Independent	Nagahiro Nagano	13,923	3.3	New
JCP	Masaki Morita	4,486	1.0	New

1960
Party	Candidate	Votes	%	±%
LDP	Tadao Kariya	69,604	16.9	+0.4
LDP	Shigeru Yoshida	68,506	16.6	+4.0
LDP	Masanobu Hamada	63,605.18	15.4	+3.2
LDP	Takao Hamada	57,995.25	14.1	+3.3
Socialist	Sei Morimoto	57,891	14.0	+1.5
Democratic Socialist	Haruki Satake	49,620	12.0	New
Socialist	Hideo Kunizawa	35,366	8.6	−2.0
JCP	Masaki Morita	9,572	2.3	+1.3

1963
Party	Candidate	Votes	%	±%
LDP	Tadao Kariya	64,873	16.1	−0.8
LDP	Takao Hamada	63,205	15.7	−0.9
Socialist	Sei Morimoto	63,125	15.7	+1.7
LDP	Ryōhei Tamura	60,458	15.0	−0.4
LDP	Masao Ōnishi	56,664	14.1	0.0
Socialist	Hideo Kunizawa	40,764	10.1	+1.5
JCP	Masamune Miyamoto	38,482	9.6	+7.3
Democratic Socialist	Bisui Miyagawa	15,133	3.8	New

1967
Party	Candidate	Votes	%	±%
LDP	Tadao Kariya	62,493	14.2	−1.9
Socialist	Izumi Inoue	61,190	13.9	−1.8
Kōmeitō	Akira Nakano	59,039	13.4	New
Socialist	Sei Morimoto	57,544	13.0	+2.9
LDP	Ryōhei Tamura	54,871	12.4	−3.3
LDP	Takao Hamada	54,283	12.3	−2.7
LDP	Masao Ōnishi	53,553	12.1	−2.0
JCP	Masamune Miyamoto	38,465	8.7	−0.9

1969
Party	Candidate	Votes	%	±%
Kōmeitō	Akira Nakano	62,494	13.8	+0.4
LDP	Masao Ōnishi	61,629	13.6	−0.6
LDP	Tadao Kariya	61,075	13.5	+1.1
LDP	Ryōhei Tamura	57,498	12.7	+0.4
JCP	Kenjirō Yamahara	56,131	12.4	+3.7
LDP	Takao Hamada	52,913	11.7	−0.4
Socialist	Izumi Inoue	47,290	10.5	−3.4
Socialist	Sei Morimoto	44,805	9.9	−3.1
Democratic Socialist	Yoshio Yamazaki	8,259	1.8	New

1972
Party	Candidate	Votes	%	±%
JCP	Kenjirō Yamahara	87,257	18.7	+6.3
Socialist	Izumi Inoue	83,585	17.9	+7.4
LDP	Ryōhei Tamura	80,990	17.3	+3.7
LDP	Tadao Kariya	76,938	16.5	+3.0
LDP	Masao Ōnishi	70,999	15.2	+2.5
Kōmeitō	Akira Nakano	66,508.39	14.2	+0.4
Independent	Asahi Taniwaki	609.59	0.1	New

1976
Party	Candidate	Votes	%	±%
Kōmeitō	Masatarō Hiraishi	91,507	19.6	+5.4
LDP	Kanzō Tanigawa	77,288	16.5	−0.8
JCP	Kenjirō Yamahara	72,515	15.5	−3.2
LDP	Masao Ōnishi	69,477	14.9	−1.6
Socialist	Izumi Inoue	68,058	14.6	−3.3
LDP	Ryōhei Tamura	62,890	13.4	−1.8
New Liberal Club	Hideo Tsukuda	25,968	5.6	New

1979
Party	Candidate	Votes	%	±%
Socialist	Izumi Inoue	83,753	18.4	+3.8
Kōmeitō	Masatarō Hiraishi	74,734	16.4	−3.2
LDP	Masao Ōnishi	72,985	16.1	−0.4
LDP	Ryōhei Tamura	72,698	16.0	+1.1
JCP	Kenjirō Yamahara	71,292	15.7	+0.2
LDP	Kanzō Tanigawa	66,045	14.5	+1.1
New Liberal Club	Hideo Tsukuda	13,216	2.9	−2.7

1980
Party	Candidate	Votes	%	±%
LDP	Masao Ōnishi	126,599	29.6	+13.5
LDP	Ryōhei Tamura	82,185	19.2	+3.2
Socialist	Izumi Inoue	68,883	16.1	−2.3
JCP	Kenjirō Yamahara	66,784	15.6	−0.1
Kōmeitō	Masatarō Hiraishi	62,399	14.6	−1.8
Independent	Hideo Tsukuda	20,460	4.8	New

1983
Party	Candidate	Votes	%	±%
Kōmeitō	Masatarō Hiraishi	81,463	18.3	+3.7
JCP	Kenjirō Yamahara	72,310	16.3	+0.7
Socialist	Izumi Inoue	69,060	15.5	−0.6
LDP	Masao Ōnishi	65,901	14.8	−14.8
LDP	Kenzō Yamaoka	61,372	13.8	−5.4
LDP	Ryōhei Tamura	59,137	13.3	New
LDP	Shōichi Ban	25,157	5.7	New
Independent	Hideo Tsukuda	10,330	2.3	−2.5

1986
Party	Candidate	Votes	%	±%
LDP	Ryōhei Tamura	79,537	18.3	+3.3
Kōmeitō	Masatarō Hiraishi	77,342	17.8	−0.5
JCP	Kenjirō Yamahara	71,008	16.3	0.0
Socialist	Izumi Inoue	70,872	16.3	+0.8
LDP	Masao Ōnishi	69,808	16.1	+2.8
LDP	Kenzō Yamaoka	66,135	15.2	+1.9

1990
Party	Candidate	Votes	%	±%
Socialist	Masanori Gotō	79,314	16.4	+0.1
LDP	Gen Nakatani	66,573	13.7	−4.6
LDP	Yūji Yamamoto	64,499	13.3	−2.8
Kōmeitō	Noritoshi Ishida	56,581	11.7	−6.1
JCP	Kenjirō Yamahara	56,088	11.6	−4.7
LDP	Kenzō Yamaoka	51,551	10.6	−4.6
Independent	Shigeya Kurio	38,856	8.0	New
Independent	Yū Hayashi	35,352	7.3	New
Independent	Kōhei Tamura	19,947	4.1	New
Independent	Naotake Tokoroya	8,266	1.7	New
Independent	Shōichi Ban	7,748	1.6	New

1993
Party	Candidate	Votes	%	±%
LDP	Gen Nakatani	75,771	17.1	+3.4
JCP	Kenjirō Yamahara	63,173	14.3	+2.7
Kōmeitō	Noritoshi Ishida	61,683	13.9	+2.2
Socialist	Masanori Gotō	59,940	13.5	−2.9
LDP	Yūji Yamamoto	57,660	13.0	−0.3
LDP	Kōhei Tamura	49,701	11.2	+0.6
New Party	Jun'ya Nagakuni	35,423	8.0	New
LDP	Hidehiko Nakauchi	25,498	5.8	New
Independent	Takeshi Chikamori	13,719	3.1	New
Turnout		640,564	69.78	
