= Kōchi 1st district =

Electoral district

Kōchi 1st District
- Parliamentary constituency for the Japanese House of Representatives
- Numbered map of Kōchi Prefecture single-member districts
- Prefecture: Kōchi
- Proportional District: Shikoku
- Electorate: 308,938

Current constituency
- Created: 1994
- Seats: One
- Party: LDP
- Representative: Gen Nakatani
- Municipalities: In the east of Kōchi city, Muroto, Nankoku, Aki, Kōnan, Kami, Aki District, Nagaoka District and Tosa District

Kōchi 1st district (高知県第1区, Kōchi-ken dai-ikku or simply 高知1区, Kōchi-ikku) is a single-member constituency of the House of Representatives in the national Diet of Japan located in Kōchi Prefecture.

== List of representatives ==
Election	Representative	Party	Dates	Notes
1996	Kenjiro Yamahara	JCP	1996 – 2000	
2000	Teru Fukui	LDP	2000 – 2014	
2003	Teru Fukui	LDP	2000 – 2014	
2005	Teru Fukui	LDP	2000 – 2014	
2009	Teru Fukui	LDP	2000 – 2014	
2012	Teru Fukui	LDP	2000 – 2014	
2014	Gen Nakatani	LDP	2014 –	
2017	Gen Nakatani	LDP	2014 –	
2021	Gen Nakatani	LDP	2014 –	
2024	Gen Nakatani	LDP	2014 –	
2026	Gen Nakatani	LDP	2014 –	

== Election results ==
2026
Party	Candidate	Votes	%	±%
LDP	Gen Nakatani (Incumbent)	92,043	59.8	▼1.7
Centrist Reform	Yūsuke Tadokoro	38,860	25.2	▼13.3
Sanseitō	Mikihiro Kinjō	23,119	15.0	
Registered electors		296,651		
Turnout			53.36	▲3.77
LDP hold				

2024
Party	Candidate	Votes	%	±%
LDP	Gen Nakatani (Incumbent)	89,110	61.51	▼2.79
CDP	Norio Takeuchi	55,750	38.49	▲7.79
Registered electors		301,199		
Turnout		144,860	49.59	▼3.91

2021
Party	Candidate	Votes	%	±%
LDP	Gen Nakatani (Incumbent)	104,837	64.32	▲10.73
CDP	Norio Takeuchi	50,033	30.70	New
NHK	Kōji Nakajima	4,081	2.50	New
Indep.	Eiji Kawata	4,036	2.48	New
Registered electors		310,468		
Turnout		162,987	53.50	▲4.79

2017
Party	Candidate	Votes	%	±%
LDP	Gen Nakatani	81,675	53.59	▲1.65
Kibō	Shū Ohishi	45,190	29.65	New
JCP	Kenji Matsumoto	25,542	16.76	▼3.61
Registered electors		318,871		
Turnout		152,407	48.71	▼0.31

2014
Party	Candidate	Votes	%	±%
LDP	Gen Nakatani (Incumbent-Kōchi 2nd)	78,279	51.94	▲9.96
DPJ	Shū Ohishi	38,237	25.37	▲0.63
JCP	Naoaki Haruna<ja>	30,694	20.37	▲2.67
Indep.	Toshihisa Fujishima	3,505	2.33	New
Registered electors		317,217		
Turnout		150,715	49.02	▼1.20

2012
Party	Candidate	Votes	%	±%
LDP	Teru Fukui (Incumbent)	44,027	41.98	▲9.45
DPJ	Shū Ohishi	25,944	24.74	▼3.40
JCP	Naoaki Haruna	18,562	17.70	▲8.05
JRP	Shinya Fujimura	16,331	15.57	New
Registered electors		213,948		
Turnout		104,864	50.22	

2009
Party	Candidate	Votes	%	±%
LDP	Teru Fukui (Incumbent)	44,068	32.53	▼10.19
Indep.	Daijiro Hashimoto	39,326	29.03	New
DPJ	Kumiko Tamura	38,117	28.14	▼11.36
JCP	Naoaki Haruna	13,072	9.65	▼8.13
HRP	Taeko Momota	890	0.66	New
Turnout				

2005
Party	Candidate	Votes	%	±%
LDP	Teru Fukui (Incumbent)	53,754	42.72	▲1.31
DPJ	Masanori Gotō<ja> (Incumbent-Shikoku PR) (reelected by PR)	49,704	39.50	▲4.70
JCP	Naoaki Haruna	22,369	17.78	▼1.67
Turnout				

2003
Party	Candidate	Votes	%	±%
LDP	Teru Fukui (Incumbent)	43,232	41.41	▲10.43
DPJ	Masanori Gotō (Incumbent-Shikoku PR) (reelected by PR)	36,333	34.80	▲9.05
JCP	Morimitsu Kajiwara	20,302	19.45	▲1.03
SDP	Hajime Tai	4,531	4.34	New
Turnout				

2000
Party	Candidate	Votes	%	±%
LDP	Teru Fukui	40,765	30.98	New
DPJ	Masanori Gōto (Incumbent-Shikoku PR) (reelected by PR)	33,883	25.75	New
Komeito	Noritoshi Ishida	32,687	24.84	New
JCP	Nobuyuki Urata	24,241	18.42	▼10.15
Turnout				

1996
Party	Candidate	Votes	%	±%
JCP	Kenjiro Yamahara<ja>	33,523	28.57	New
DPJ	Masanori Gotō (elected by PR)	31,391	26.75	New
NFP	Noritoshi Ishida	30,281	25.80	New
Indep.	Shōji Taniai	21,480	18.30	New
Indep.	Tatsuo Yokota	678	0.58	New
Turnout				
