= Zweitmandat =

German electoral system term

The Zweitmandat (English: second mandate) was a feature in the variation of mixed-member proportional representation (MMP) used to elect the Landtag of Baden-Württemberg. Until 2022, Baden-Württemberg's system did not allow voters to vote directly for the party lists in contrast to most variations of MMP, such as the German federal electoral system. Instead, proportional seats were filled by losing candidates who won the highest proportion of votes within their party.

== Mechanism ==
Unlike most other state electoral systems, voters only had one vote, which counted toward both the candidate's individual vote and their party's overall vote. The latter was used to determine the overall distribution of seats between parties in the Landtag, while the former was used to determine which candidates will fill the seats.

The standard size of the Landtag is 120 seats, of which 70 are single-member constituencies and 50 are proportional seats. As in most MMP systems, the candidate winning a plurality in each single-member constituency is declared elected. Candidates elected in this manner are denoted as winning a "first mandate" (German: Erstmandat) in the constituency. After this, the proportional seats are distributed between each party via the Sainte-Laguë method in order to create proportionality within the Landtag; if overhang seats are present, leveling seats will be added as necessary. The proportional seats are allocated across Baden-Württemberg's four government districts.

The proportional seats are then filled by each party's best-performing candidates, ensuring they were not already elected via Erstmandat: for example, if a party wins six seats of which two were first mandates, their four best-performing losing candidates will fill the remaining seats. Candidates elected in this manner are listed as winning a second mandate (Zweitmandat). Since the process is carried out independently for each party, it does not necessarily ensure that all best-performing candidates overall will be elected.

Candidates may be put forward in multiple constituencies. If a candidate is entitled to a Zweitmandat in multiple constituencies, they are deemed elected in the constituency in which they won more votes. If the candidate won the same number of votes in each constituency, they are deemed elected in the constituency in which they won a higher proportion of votes.

It is possible for a party to win every available Erstmandat in a government district but still be entitled to Zweitmandat seats. Parties may submit substitute candidates (German: Ersatzbewerbern) in each constituency to fill mid-term vacancies in the Landtag; the electoral law allows these substitute candidates to fill Zweitmandate if no others are available. Historically, two members have been elected in this manner, both from the CDU: August Entringer in Wangen in 1972 and Bodensee in 1976, and Franz Baum in Biberach in 1976, 1980, and 1984. During this time, the CDU found itself in the unusual position of having two representatives serving a single constituency simultaneously.

== History ==
Prior to the 2011 state election, the number of votes was used to determine which candidates would be elected via Zweitmandat. However, this was criticised for giving an advantage to candidates from more populous constituencies, typically located in cities. Since the 2011 election, the proportion of votes won has been used instead.

== See also ==
- Sekihairitsu, a similar "best loser" system that is also used to allocate proportional representation seats in Japan
- Dual-member proportional representation, a similar system proposed in Canada
