= Gen Nakatani =

Japanese politician (born 1957)

- 中谷 元
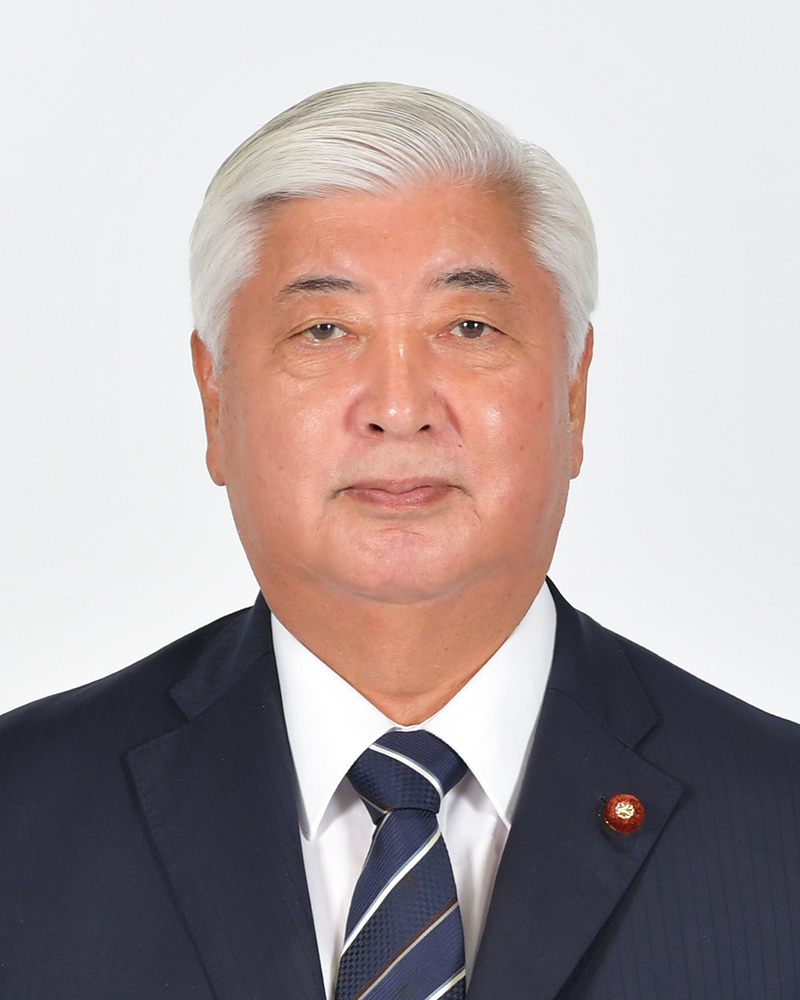
- Official portrait, 2024

Minister of Defense
- In office 1 October 2024 – 21 October 2025
- Prime Minister: Shigeru Ishiba
- Preceded by: Minoru Kihara
- Succeeded by: Shinjirō Koizumi
- In office 24 December 2014 – 3 August 2016
- Prime Minister: Shinzo Abe
- Preceded by: Akinori Eto
- Succeeded by: Tomomi Inada

Director-General of the Japan Defense Agency
- In office 4 April 2001 – 30 September 2002
- Prime Minister: Yoshirō Mori; Junichiro Koizumi
- Preceded by: Toshitsugu Saito
- Succeeded by: Shigeru Ishiba

Member of the House of Representatives
- Incumbent
- Assumed office 19 February 1990
- Preceded by: Ryōhei Tamura
- Constituency: Kōchi at-large (1990–1996); Kōchi 2nd (1996–2014); Kōchi 1st (2014–present)

Personal details
- Born: 14 October 1957 (age 68) Kōchi, Japan
- Party: Liberal Democratic
- Education: National Defense Academy

Military service
- Allegiance: Japan
- Branch/service: Japan Ground Self-Defense Force
- Years of service: 1980–1984
- Rank: First Lieutenant

Gen Nakatani (中谷 元, Nakatani Gen; born 14 October 1957) is a Japanese politician who was Director General of the Japan Defense Agency (now Japan Ministry of Defense) in the first cabinet of former prime minister Junichiro Koizumi in 2001-2002 and was appointed the Minister of Defense by former Prime Minister Shinzo Abe in 2014. Nakatani was again named to the position of Minister of Defense for the cabinet of Shigeru Ishiba in 2024.

== Early life and education ==
Nakatani was born in Kōchi and attended the National Defense Academy of Japan. He served for four years as a commissioned officer in the Japan Ground Self-Defense Force (20th Infantry Regiment and Airborne Training Unit).

== Political career ==
Nakatani first ran for elected office as a Liberal Democratic Party candidate in the 1990 general election and won one of five seats representing Kōchi Prefecture, and held this seat in the 1993 general election. Following electoral reform in 1994 that divided Kōchi into three single-member districts, he successfully contested the Kōchi 2nd district in the 1996 general election and held this seat until the 2014 general election, when he switched to the Kōchi 1st district; the abolishment of the Kōchi 3rd district required the Liberal Democratic Party's Kōchi members to switch seats so that they could all remain in office. Yuji Yamamoto, who had held the 3rd district since 1996, switched to the 2nd district. Meanwhile Teru Fukui, who had held the 1st district since 1996, switched to the Shikoku proportional representation block.

Nakatani supported Koichi Kato and Taku Yamasaki's no-confidence motion against Prime Minister Yoshiro Mori in 2000, and was appointed to head the Japan Defense Agency under Prime Minister Junichiro Koizumi in the following year.

On 28 April 2015, Nakatani was among the guests invited to the state dinner hosted by U.S. President Barack Obama in Abe’s honor at the White House.

== Political positions ==
In a joint letter initiated by Norbert Röttgen and Anthony Gonzalez ahead of the 47th G7 summit in 2021, Nakatani joined some 70 legislators from Europe and the US in calling upon their leaders to take a tough stance on China and to "avoid becoming dependent" on the country for technology including artificial intelligence and 5G.

In December 2025, Nakatani announced his support for a constitutional amendment that would recognize same-sex marriage.

== Notes ==
Political offices
Preceded by Akinori Eto	Minister of Defense; 2014–2016	Succeeded by Tomomi Inada
Preceded by Minoru Kihara	Minister of Defense; 2024–2025	Succeeded by Shinjiro Koizumi
