= Teru Fukui =

Japanese politician

- 福井 照
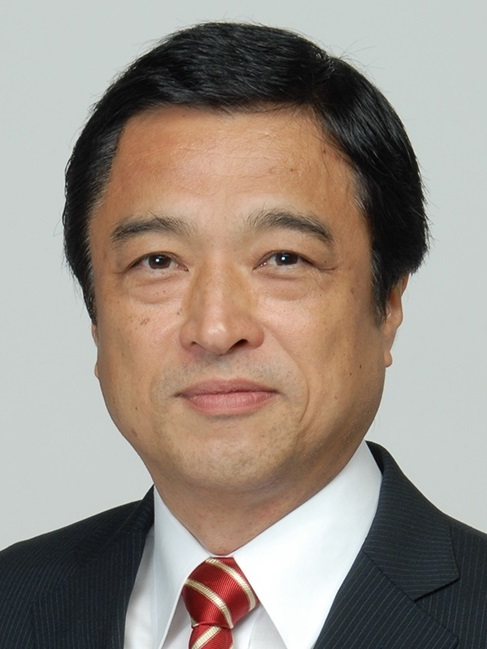
- Official portrait, 2018

Member of the House of Representatives
- In office 26 June 2000 – 14 October 2021
- Preceded by: Kenjiro Yamahara
- Succeeded by: Multi-member district
- Constituency: Kōchi 1st (2000–2014); Shikoku PR (2014–2021)

Personal details
- Born: 14 December 1953 (age 72) Abeno, Osaka, Japan
- Party: Liberal Democratic
- Education: University of Tokyo

Teru Fukui (福井 照, Fukui Teru; born 14 December 1953) is a Japanese politician of the Liberal Democratic Party, a member of the House of Representatives in the Diet (national legislature).

== Overviews ==
A native of Abeno-ku, Osaka and graduate of the University of Tokyo, he joined the Ministry of Construction in 1976. Leaving the ministry in 1999, he was elected to the House of Representatives for the first time in 2000.
