= Sekihairitsu =

Electoral system used in Japan

Sekihairitsu (惜敗率, literally the "narrow loss ratio", sometimes translated as "ratio of margin of defeat", "best loser calculation" or "second-chance rule" (Note: The "second chance" single-member district losers receive to be elected by PR does not stem from the sekihairitsu system but from the fact that it is permitted at all to nominate district candidates on a PR list.)) is a method used in the proportional representation (PR) constituencies ("blocks") for the Japanese House of Representatives to determine the order of candidates placed on the same list position by their party.

Under the PR system introduced in the 1996 general election for 176 (initially 200) of the House of Representatives' 465 (initially 500) seats, political parties are free to nominate candidates running or not running concurrently in one of the 289 single-member first-past-the-post electoral districts. The parties may rank the PR list candidates they nominate in a regional "block" in any order they decide. However, they are allowed to (but don't have to) place some or all of the PR candidates concurrently running in a single-member district on the same position on their PR list. In that case, the sekihairitsu is used to determine the order of candidates. It is calculated by dividing the number of votes a candidate received in his electoral district by the district winner's votes. After all district winners are struck from the list—as they already have won a seat and thus cannot be elected by PR—all remaining candidates put on the same list rank are then arranged according to their sekihairitsu in descending order.

While the sekihairitsu system allows – depending on a party's nomination strategy and electoral success – more successful candidates (those "narrowly losing" their districts) prioritized election by PR, it does not change the fact that the Japanese voting system is a parallel, i.e. non-compensatory voting system: The number of PR seats for a party is independent from the results in the single-member districts and is exclusively determined by the number of PR votes the party receives. And unlike the Open list proportional voting system used since 2001 in elections for the House of Councillors of Japan where voters may choose to cast a preference vote for a single PR candidate, the sekihairitsu system doesn't allow the voters to influence directly who is elected by PR.

The new electoral system was initially unpopular and poorly understood – an Asahi poll in October 1996 found that 19 % of respondents liked it while 60 % were unhappy with it; a Yomiuri poll in the same month found that only 5 % of voters found they understood the system well, 32 % somewhat, and more than 60 % according to their own estimate understood little or nothing at all of it.

It has been criticized by several newspaper editorials, and many voters mistakenly identified the sekihairitsu system as the culprit for the "resurrections" that occurred under the new system, that is, the possibility that a candidate who loses his majoritarian district election may still win a seat in the proportional election. But in fact, it is the dual candidacy that makes this possible whereas the sekihairitsu system on the contrary creates a link, albeit indirect and conditional on the parties using the system in their nominations, between a candidate's personal district success (or the "narrowness of his defeat") and his chance to be elected in the proportional vote.

== Example ==
The Liberal Democratic Party (LDP) list in the Tōhoku PR block in the 2009 general election of members of the House of Representatives consisted of 24 candidates who were also running for district seats and four candidates who were only running on the PR list. The LDP ranked the candidates as follows:

List position	Candidate[s]	Notes
1	Masayoshi Yoshino	Yoshino faced an uphill district race against Democratic incumbent Kōichirō Gemba in Fukushima 3rd district. He was placed as sole candidate on list position 1 virtually ensuring his re-election even if he were to lose the district by a high margin.
2	Ken'ya Akiba	Akiba did not contest an electoral district. His list position 2 made his re-election highly likely.
3	23 candidates concurrently contesting a district	As these candidates were all placed on the same list position, their chance to be elected in the proportional block in case they lost their district races depended on the sekihairitsu, i.e., on how narrowly they lost their respective districts.
26	Nobuhiro Ōmiya	These three candidates who were only in the proportional race would only have a chance to be elected in a very successful election for the LDP. Example: Even if the LDP would have received half of the 14 proportional seats in Tōhoku, still at least 19 of the candidates above would have to have won their district races for Nobuhiro Ōmiya to be elected.
27	Shigeyo Nagaoka	These three candidates who were only in the proportional race would only have a chance to be elected in a very successful election for the LDP. Example: Even if the LDP would have received half of the 14 proportional seats in Tōhoku, still at least 19 of the candidates above would have to have won their district races for Nobuhiro Ōmiya to be elected.
28	Hisataka Satō	These three candidates who were only in the proportional race would only have a chance to be elected in a very successful election for the LDP. Example: Even if the LDP would have received half of the 14 proportional seats in Tōhoku, still at least 19 of the candidates above would have to have won their district races for Nobuhiro Ōmiya to be elected.

The election result in the 2009 Tōhoku proportional race gave the LDP 27.9% of the vote and four seats. Of the district races, LDP candidates only won five, all from the 23 put on the same proportional list position. The first two elected PR representatives were Masayoshi Yoshino (who lost to Kōichirō Gemba by 56,858 votes to 159,826) and Ken'ya Akiba. To determine the other two elected proportional representatives, the Sekihairitsu comes into play:

- Toshiaki Endō received 104,911 votes in Yamagata 1st district. Democrat Michihiko Kano won the district with 106,202 votes. Endō's Sekihairitsu was therefore 104,911÷106,202=98.7%. As this was the highest number among all LDP district losers in Tōhoku, he was the third elected PR representative.
- The fourth proportional seat went to Katsutoshi Kaneda who lost Akita 2nd district with 92,600 votes versus independent Hiroshi Kawaguchi's 93,951 votes – a Sekihairitsu of 98.5%.
- The top ranking candidate not to be elected was Nobuhide Minorikawa with a Sekihairitsu of 88.9% (90,575 votes in his Akita 3rd district versus Democrat Kimiko Kyōno's 101,777). While he did not win a seat, his position as a runner-up means he is the first replacement candidate if one of the four proportional LDP seats above falls vacant before the next House of Representatives general election.
- All remaining candidates (not listed here) are also ranked by their Sekihairitsu in descending order for the (less likely) case that two or even more LDP proportional seats in Tōhoku would fall vacant.

== See also ==
- Zweitmandat, a similar "best loser" system that is also used to allocate proportional representation seats in the German state of Baden-Württemberg
