= Yūji Yamamoto =

Japanese politician

Yuji Yamamoto
- 山本 有二
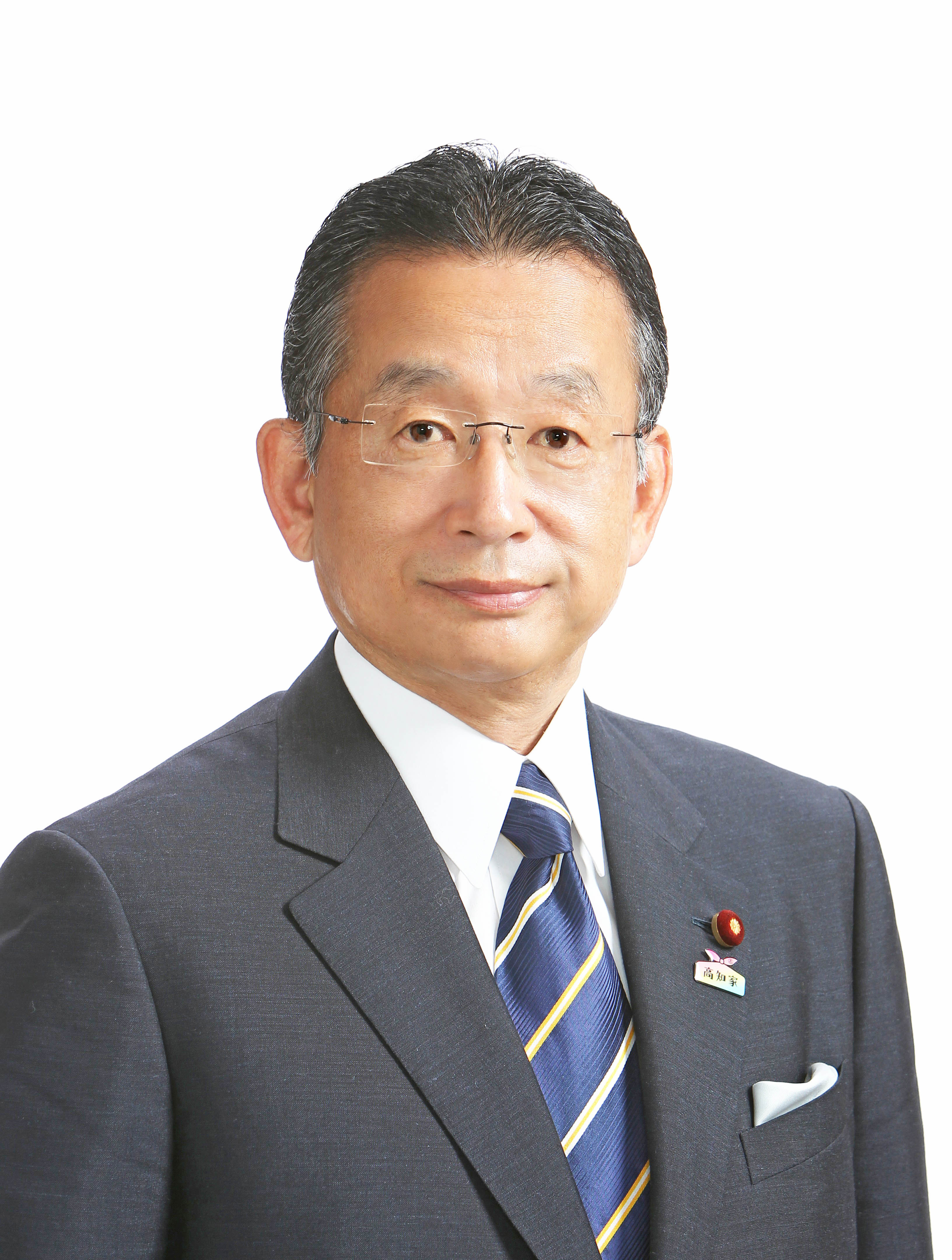
- Official portrait, 2015

Minister of Agriculture, Forestry, and Fisheries
- In office 3 August 2016 – 3 August 2017
- Prime Minister: Shinzo Abe
- Preceded by: Hiroshi Moriyama
- Succeeded by: Ken Saitō

Minister of State for Financial Services
- In office 26 September 2006 – 27 August 2007
- Prime Minister: Shinzo Abe
- Preceded by: Kaoru Yosano
- Succeeded by: Yoshimi Watanabe

Member of the House of Representatives
- In office 19 February 1990 – 9 October 2024
- Preceded by: Masao Ōnishi
- Succeeded by: Seiichiro Murakami
- Constituency: Kōchi at-large (1990–1996); Kōchi 3rd (1996–2014); Kōchi 2nd (2014–2017); Shikoku PR (2017–2024)

Member of the Kōchi Prefectural Assembly
- In office 1985–1989

Personal details
- Born: 11 May 1952 (age 74) Ochi, Kōchi, Japan
- Party: Liberal Democratic
- Education: Waseda University

Yuji Yamamoto (山本 有二, Yamamoto Yūji; born 11 May 1952) is a former Japanese politician of the Liberal Democratic Party, who served as a member of the House of Representatives in the Diet (national legislature).

A native of Kōchi Prefecture and graduate of Waseda University, he was elected to the Kōchi Prefectural Assembly in 1985 (serving for one term) and then to the House of Representatives for the first time in 1990. Yamamoto later served as Minister of Agriculture, Forestry, and Fisheries in the Third Abe Cabinet.

== Trans-Pacific Partnership ==
During a speech at a fundraising event supporting Tsutomu Sato, the ruling Liberal Democratic Party's Diet affairs chief, Yamamoto said that "Sato will decide whether or not we'll force the passage [of the Trans-Pacific Partnership". Within days, Yamamoto withdrew the remarks and apologized. However, the four main opposition parties pressed for his resignation over the comment.
