= Noritoshi Ishida =

Japanese politician

- 石田 祝稔
- Official portrait, 2008

Member of the House of Representatives
- In office 10 November 2003 – 14 October 2021
- Preceded by: Kazuyoshi Endō
- Succeeded by: Masayasu Yamasaki
- Constituency: Shikoku PR
- In office 19 February 1990 – 27 September 1996
- Preceded by: Masatarō Hiraishi
- Succeeded by: Constituency abolished
- Constituency: Kōchi at-large

Personal details
- Born: 1 September 1951 (age 75) Kōchi City, Kōchi, Japan
- Party: Komeito
- Other political affiliations: CGP (1990–1994); NFP (1994–1998)
- Education: University of Electro-Communications; Sōka University

Noritoshi Ishida (石田 祝稔, Ishida Noritoshi; born 1 September 1951) is a Japanese politician belonging to the New Komeito Party. He served as a member of the House of Representatives in the Diet (national legislature).

== Early life ==
A native of Kōchi, Ishida attended the University of Electro-Communications as an undergraduate and received a master's degree from Soka University. After that, he worked at the government of Tokyo from 1979 to 1988.

== Political career ==
Ishida was elected to the House of Representatives for the first time in 1990. He served eight terms in the house, first from 1990 to 1996, and then again from 2003 to 2021.
