= Kōchi 2nd district =

Legislative district of Japan

Kōchi 2nd District
- Parliamentary constituency for the Japanese House of Representatives
- Numbered map of Kōchi Prefecture single-member districts
- Prefecture: Kōchi
- Proportional District: Shikoku
- Electorate: 284,670

Current constituency
- Created: 1994
- Seats: One
- Party: LDP
- Representative: Masanao Ozaki
- Municipalities: In the west of Kōchi city, Tosa, Susaki, Sukumo, Tosashimizu, Shimanto, Agawa District, Takaoka District and Hata District

Kōchi 2nd district (高知県第2区, Kōchi-ken dai-niku or simply 高知2区, Kōchi-niku) is a single-member constituency of the House of Representatives in the national Diet of Japan located in Kōchi Prefecture.

== List of representatives ==
Election	Representative	Party	Dates	Notes
1996	Gen Nakatani	LDP	1996 – 2014	
2000	Gen Nakatani	LDP	1996 – 2014	
2003	Gen Nakatani	LDP	1996 – 2014	
2005	Gen Nakatani	LDP	1996 – 2014	
2009	Gen Nakatani	LDP	1996 – 2014	
2012	Gen Nakatani	LDP	1996 – 2014	
2014	Yūji Yamamoto	LDP	2014 – 2017	
2017	Hajime Hirota	Indep.	2017 – 2020	
2017	Hajime Hirota	CDP	2020 - 2021	
2021	Masanao Ozaki	LDP	2021 -	
2024	Masanao Ozaki	LDP	2021 -	
2026	Masanao Ozaki	LDP	2021 -	

== Election results ==
2026
Party	Candidate	Votes	%	±%
LDP	Masanao Ozaki (Incumbent)	102,523	69.5	▼0.8
JCP	Yuriko Hamagawa	24,115	16.3	▼13.4
DPP	Tsuyoshi Maeda	20,942	14.2	
Registered electors		268,314		
Turnout			56.68	▲2.09
LDP hold				

2024
Party	Candidate	Votes	%	±%
LDP	Masanao Ozaki (Incumbent) (endorsed by Komeito)	102,501	70.26	▲3.02
JCP	Yuriko Hamagawa	43,394	29.74	New
Registered electors		274,184		
Turnout		145,895	54.59	▼6.91

2021
Party	Candidate	Votes	%	±%
LDP	Masanao Ozaki	117,810	67.24	▲23.72
CDP	Hajime Hirota (Incumbent)	55,214	31.52	New
NHK	Shinichiro Hirota	2,171	1.24	New
Registered electors		287,552		
Turnout		175,195	61.49	▲6.29

2017
Party	Candidate	Votes	%	±%
Indep.	Hajime Hirota	92,179	56.48	New
LDP	Yūji Yamamoto (Incumbent) (elected by PR)	71,029	43.52	▼10.09
Registered electors		301,709		
Turnout		163,208	55.20	▲2.06

2014
Party	Candidate	Votes	%	±%
LDP	Yūji Yamamoto (Incumbent-Kōchi 3rd)	83,764	53.61	▼19.98
DPJ	Norio Takeuchi	42,562	27.24	▼8.00
JCP	Haruyuki Tanizaki	29,913	19.15	▼7.26
Registered electors		304,249		
Turnout		156,239	53.14	

2012
Party	Candidate	Votes	%	±%
LDP	Gen Nakatani (Incumbent)	76,662	73.59	▲20.17
JCP	Yoshihide Okada	27,513	26.41	▲16.35
Turnout				

2009
Party	Candidate	Votes	%	±%
LDP	Gen Nakatani (Incumbent)	75,554	53.42	▲2.29
DPJ	Kiyo Kusumoto	49,842	35.24	▲2.45
JCP	Masahiro Yamanaka	14,225	10.06	▼6.02
HRP	Risa Ito	1,822	1.29	New
Turnout				

2005
Party	Candidate	Votes	%	±%
LDP	Gen Nakatani (Incumbent)	70,010	51.13	▼7.91
DPJ	Kumiko Tamura	44,890	32.79	▲7.24
JCP	Haruyuki Tanizaki	22,014	16.08	▲0.67
Turnout				

2003
Party	Candidate	Votes	%	±%
LDP	Gen Nakatani (Incumbent)	72,504	59.04	▲5.26
DPJ	Kumiko Tamura	31,377	25.55	▼2.48
JCP	Haruyuki Tanizaki	18,927	15.41	▼2.79
Turnout				

2000
Party	Candidate	Votes	%	±%
LDP	Gen Nakatani (Incumbent)	67,312	53.78	▼9.17
DPJ	Hisami Nakamura	35,079	28.03	New
JCP	Haruyuki Tanizaki	22,774	18.20	▼4.30
Turnout				

1996
Party	Candidate	Votes	%	±%
LDP	Gen Nakatani	72,772	62.95	New
JCP	Haruyuki Tanizaki	26,018	22.50	New
NSP	Yoshihiko Hamada	16,820	14.55	New
Turnout				
