= Hisashi Tokunaga =

Japanese politician

- 徳永 久志
- Official portrait, 2010

Member of the House of Representatives
- In office 5 November 2021 – 9 October 2024
- Constituency: Kinki PR

Member of the House of Councillors
- In office 29 July 2007 – 28 July 2013
- Preceded by: Hidetoshi Yamashita
- Succeeded by: Takeshi Ninoyu
- Constituency: Shiga at-large

Member of the Shiga Prefectural Assembly
- In office 30 April 1999 – 29 July 2007
- Constituency: Ōmihachiman City

Personal details
- Born: 27 June 1963 (age 63) Moriguchi, Osaka, Japan
- Party: Innovation (since 2024)
- Other political affiliations: Independent (1999–2007); DPJ (2007–2016); DP (2016–2017); KnT (2017–2018); DPP (2018–2020); CDP (2020–2023); FEFA (2023–2024)
- Education: Waseda University
- Website: www.e-siga.com

Hisashi Tokunaga (徳永 久志, Tokunaga Hisashi; born 27 June 1963) is a Japanese politician who was a member of the House of Councillors and later, the House of Representatives. A graduate of Waseda University, he was elected to the National Diet for the first time in 2007 after serving in the assembly of Shiga Prefecture.

== Political career ==
In the 2007 Japanese House of Councillors election, he ran as a Democratic Party candidate from Shiga at-large district and was elected after defeating Hidetoshi Yamashita, an incumbent Liberal Democratic Party member.

On 9 June 2010, he was appointed Parliamentary Vice-Minister for Foreign Affairs by Kan Cabinet and worked under Foreign Minister Seiji Maehara and his successor, Foreign Minister Takeaki Matsumoto.

On 15 December 2010, he attended the United Nations Security Council Ministerial Meeting on Iraq in New York as a representative of the Japanese government. Three United Nations Security Council resolution were adopted at the meeting, and Tokunaga has also made a speech on the SDF's contribution to Iraq's reconstruction. He visited Middle Eastern countries from 10 to 11 January of the following year. In Jordan, he met with Prime Minister Samir Rifai and signed an official letter of exchange with Minister of Planning and International Cooperation Hassan to improve water supply in southern Jordan.

In the 2013 Japanese House of Councillors election, he sought re-election, but lost to Liberal Democratic Party candidate Takeshi Ninoyu (son of Satoshi Ninoyu).

In the 2014 Japanese general election, he ran as a Democratic Party candidate from Shiga 4th district but lost to Takaya Mutō, an incumbent Liberal Democratic Party member.

In 2016, when the Democratic Party merged with the Japan Innovation Party and the Democratic Party was formed, Tokunaga joined this party.

In 2017, the Democratic Progressive Party was divided into the right-wing Kibō no Tō and the left-wing Constitutional Democratic Party. Tokunaga joined the Kibō no Tō.

In the 2017 Japanese general election, he ran as a Kibō no Tō candidate from Shiga 4th district, but lost to Hiroo Kotera of the Liberal Democratic Party, who ran on behalf of Mutō, who retired due to a money scandal over stocks.

The Kibō no Tō merged with the Democratic Party to form the Democratic Party for the People. Tokunaga joined the Democratic Party for the People and became the head of Shiga 4th district branch of the Democratic Party for the People on 12 December 2018.

On 15 September 2020, the former Constitutional Democratic Party and the former Democratic Party for the People joined together to form a new "Constitutional Democratic Party". Tokunaga joined the new party.

In the 2021 Japanese general election, he ran as a Constitutional Democratic Party candidate from Shiga 4th district, but lost again to Hiroo Kodera of the Liberal Democratic Party. However, since the Constitutional Democratic Party won three seats in the Kinki proportional representation block and Tokunaga had the third Sekihairitsu (83.119%), he was elected by Kinki proportional representation block. In the 2021 Constitutional Democratic Party of Japan leadership election (held on 30 November) following the resignation of Yukio Edano, he endorsed Kenta Izumi.
