= Shiga Prefecture =

Prefecture of Japan

Shiga Prefecture 滋賀県
- Prefecture

Japanese transcription(s)
  - Japanese: 滋賀県
  - Rōmaji: Shiga-ken
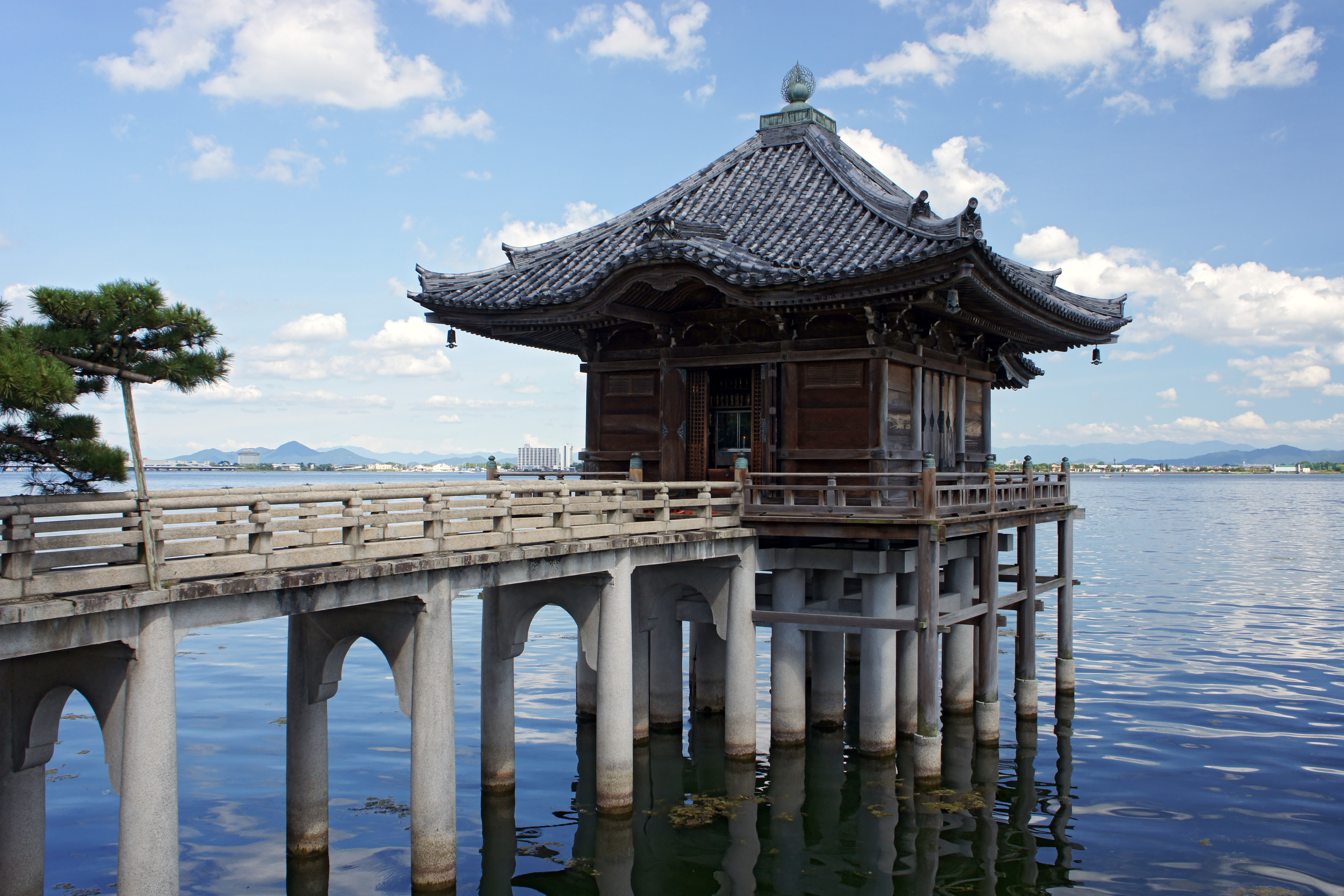
- The floating pavilion of Mangetsu-ji on the shores of Lake Biwa, the largest freshwater lake in Japan, located in Otsu City, Shiga Prefecture

- Flag Symbol
- Anthem: Shiga kenmin no uta
- Coordinates: 35°7′N 136°4′E
- Country: Japan
- Region: Kansai
- Island: Honshu
- Capital: Ōtsu
- Subdivisions: Districts: 3, Municipalities: 19

Government
  - Governor: Taizō Mikazuki

Area
  - Total: 4,017.38 km^{2} (1,551.12 sq mi)
  - Rank: 38th

Population (October 1, 2015)
  - Total: 1,412,916
  - Rank: 28th
  - Density: 351.701/km^{2} (910.901/sq mi)

GDP
  - Total: JP¥ 7,006 billion US$ 46.7 billion (2025)
- ISO 3166 code: JP-25
- Website: http://www.pref.shiga.lg.jp
- Symbols of Japan
- Bird: Little grebe (Tachybaptus ruficollis)
- Flower: Rhododendron (Rhododendron metternichii var. hondoense)
- Tree: Japanese maple (Acer palmatum)

Shiga Prefecture (滋賀県, Shiga-ken; Japanese pronunciation: [ɕí.ɡä̀, -ŋä̀, ɕì.ɡä́.kè̞ɴ̀, -ŋä́.kè̞ɴ̀]) is an inland prefecture of Japan in the Kansai region of Honshu. Shiga Prefecture has a population of 1,398,972 as of 1 February 2025 and has a geographic area of 4,017 km^{2} (1,551 sq mi). Shiga Prefecture borders Fukui Prefecture to the north, Gifu Prefecture to the northeast, Mie Prefecture to the southeast, and Kyoto Prefecture to the west.

Ōtsu is the capital and largest city of Shiga Prefecture, with other major cities including Kusatsu, Nagahama, and Higashiōmi. Shiga Prefecture encircles Lake Biwa, the largest freshwater lake in Japan, and 37% of the total land area is designated as Natural Parks, the highest of any prefecture. Shiga Prefecture's southern half is located adjacent to the former capital city of Kyoto and forms part of Greater Kyoto, the fourth-largest metropolitan area in Japan. Shiga Prefecture is home to Ōmi beef, the Eight Views of Ōmi, and Hikone Castle, one of four national treasure castles in Japan.

== History ==
Shiga was known as Ōmi Province or Gōshū before the prefectural system was established. Omi was a neighbor of Nara and Kyoto, at the junction of western and eastern Japan. During the period 667 to 672, Emperor Tenji founded a palace in Otsu. In 742, Emperor Shōmu founded a palace in Shigaraki. In the early Heian period, Saichō was born in the north of Otsu and founded Enryaku-ji, the center of Tendai and a UNESCO World Heritage Site and monument of Ancient Kyoto now.

During the Heian period, the Sasaki clan ruled Omi, and afterward, the Rokkaku clan, Kyōgoku clan, and Azai clans ruled Omi. While during the Azuchi-Momoyama period, Oda Nobunaga subjugated Omi and built Azuchi Castle on the eastern shores of Lake Biwa in 1579. Tōdō Takatora, Gamō Ujisato, Oichi, Yodo-dono, Ohatsu, and Oeyo were Omi notables during this period.

In 1600, Ishida Mitsunari, born in the east of Nagahama and based in Sawayama Castle, made war against Tokugawa Ieyasu in Sekigahara, Gifu. After the battle, Ieyasu made Ii Naomasa a new lord of Sawayama. Naomasa established the Hikone Domain, later known for Ii Naosuke. Ii Naosuke became the Tokugawa shogunate's Tairō and concluded commercial treaties with the Western powers and thus ended Japan's isolation from the world in the 19th century. Besides the Hikone Domain, many domains ruled Omi such as Zeze.

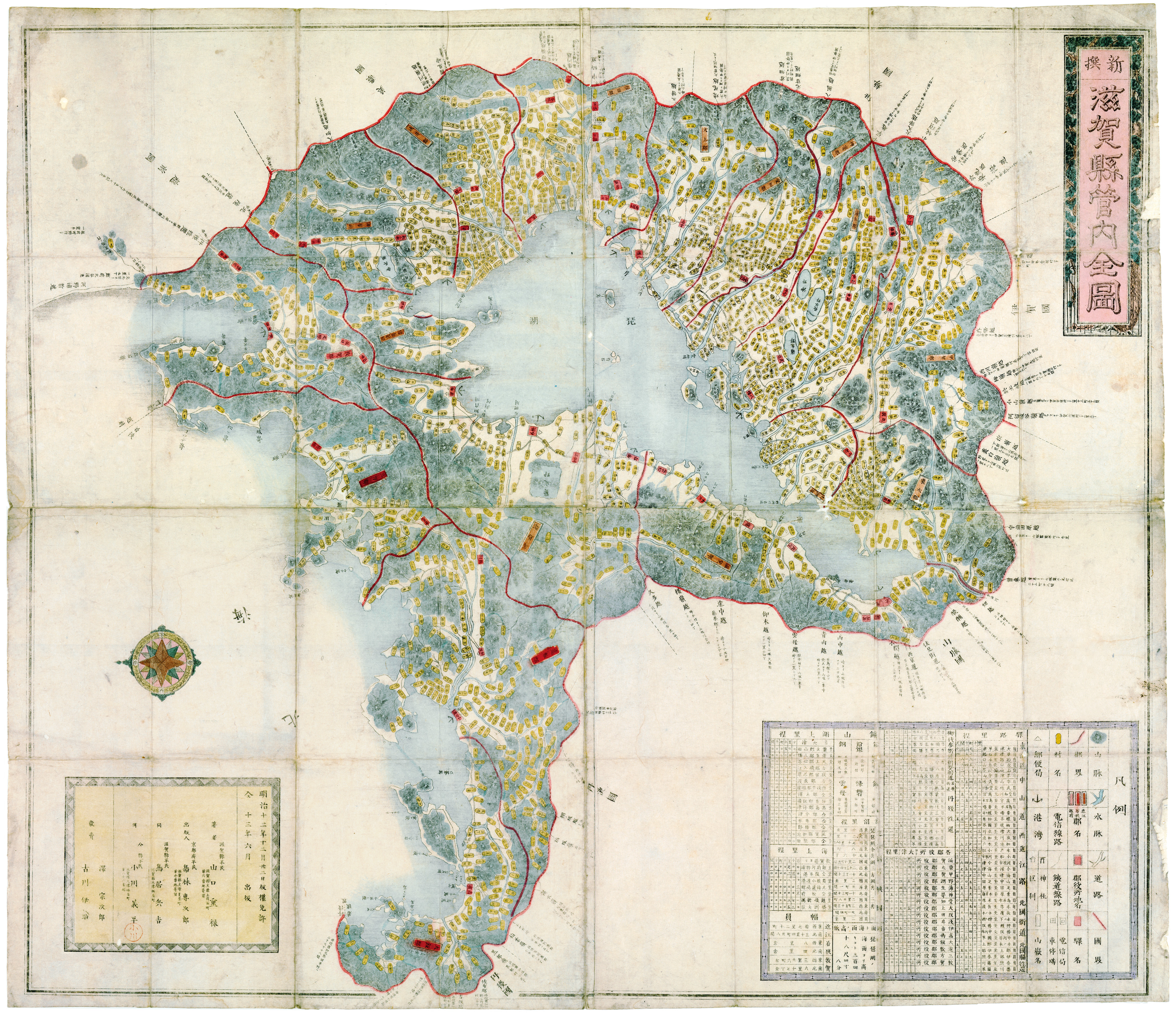
Map of Shiga Prefecture, 1880

With the abolition of the han system, eight prefectures were formed in Omi. They were unified into Shiga Prefecture in September 1872. "Shiga Prefecture" was named after "Shiga District" because Otsu belonged to the district until 1898. From August 1876 to February 1881, southern Fukui Prefecture had been incorporated into Shiga Prefecture.

In 2015, Shiga Governor Taizō Mikazuki conducted a survey asking citizens whether they felt it necessary to change the name of the prefecture, partly to raise its profile as a destination for domestic tourism.

== Geography ==
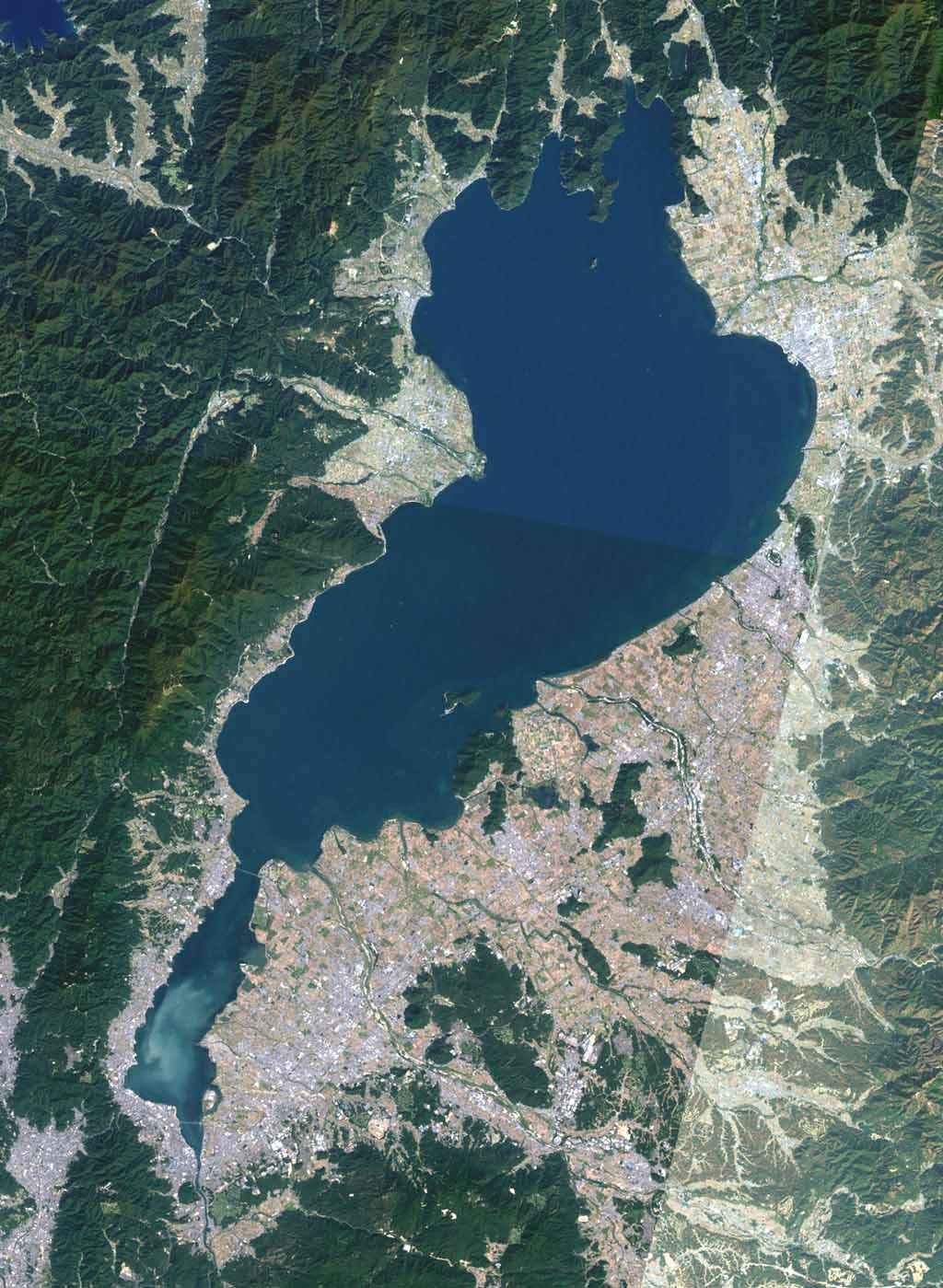
Lake Biwa in Shiga Prefecture viewed from space

Shiga borders Fukui Prefecture in the north, Gifu Prefecture in the east, Mie Prefecture in the southeast, and Kyoto Prefecture in the west.

Lake Biwa, Japan's largest, is located at the center of this prefecture. It occupies one-sixth of its area. The Seta River flows from Lake Biwa to Osaka Bay through Kyoto. This is the only natural river that flows out from the lake. Most other natural rivers flow into the lake. There were many lagoons around Lake Biwa, but most of them were reclaimed in 1940s. One of the preserved lagoons is the wetland (水郷, suigō) in Omihachiman, and it was selected as the first Important Cultural Landscapes in 2006.

The lake divides the prefecture into four different areas: Kohoku (湖北; north of lake) centered Nagahama, Kosei (湖西; west of lake) centered Imazu, Kotō (湖東; east of lake) centered Hikone and Konan (湖南; south of lake) centered Otsu.

Plains stretch to the eastern shore of Lake Biwa. The prefecture is enclosed by mountain ranges with the Hira Mountains and Mount Hiei in the west, the Ibuki Mountains in the northeast, and the Suzuka Mountains in the southeast. Mount Ibuki is the highest mountain in Shiga. In Yogo, a small lake known for the legend of the heavenly robe of an angel (天女の羽衣, tennyo no hagoromo), which is similar to a western Swan maiden.

Shiga's climate sharply varies between north and south. Southern Shiga is usually warm, but northern Shiga is typically cold with high snowfall and hosts many skiing grounds. In Nakanokawachi, the northernmost village of Shiga, snow reached a depth of 5.6 metres (18 ft) in 1936.

As of 1 April 2014, 37% of the total land area of the prefecture was designated as Natural Parks (the highest total of any prefecture), namely the Biwako and Suzuka Quasi-National Parks; and Kotō, Kutsuki-Katsuragawa, and Mikami-Tanakami-Shigaraki Prefectural Natural Parks.

== Municipalities ==
=== Cities ===
Map of Shiga Prefecture City Town

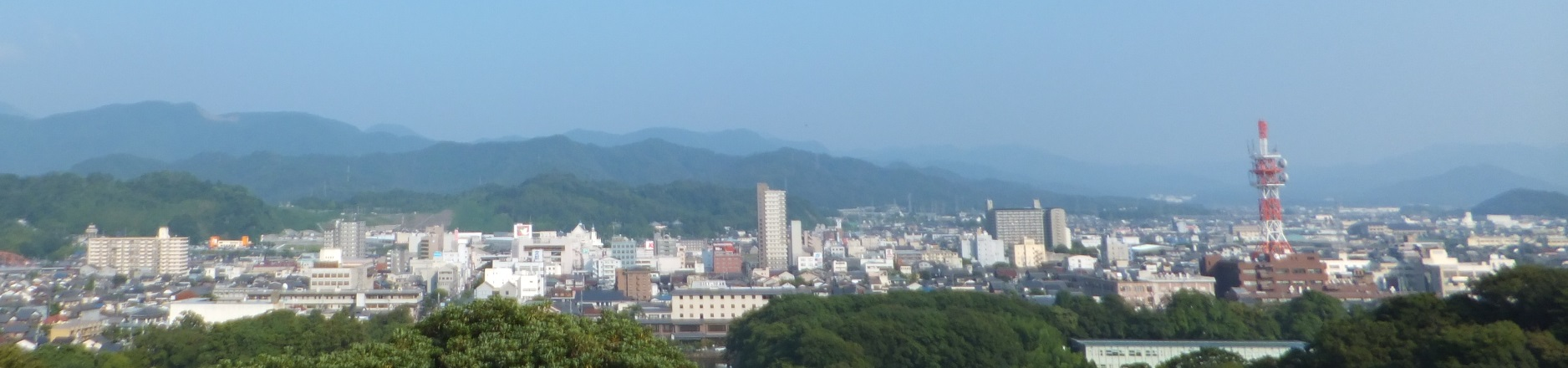
Hikone

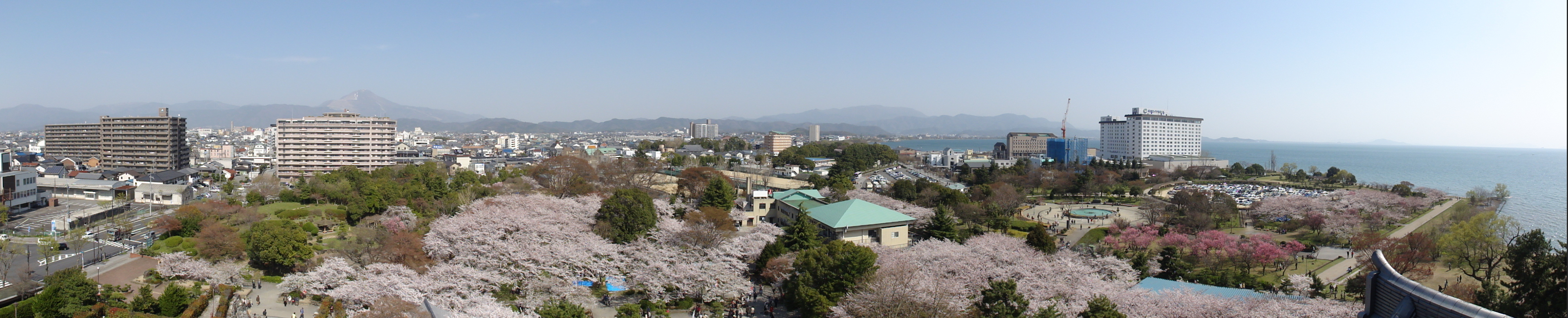
Nagahama

Thirteen cities are located in Shiga Prefecture:

Name		Area (km^{2})	Population	Population density (per km^{2})	Map
Rōmaji	Kanji	Area (km^{2})	Population	Population density (per km^{2})	Map
Higashiōmi	東近江市	388.58	113,460	291.99	
Hikone	彦根市	196.84	113,349	575.84	
Kōka	甲賀市	481.62	89,202	185.21	
Konan	湖南市	70.4	54,240	770.46	
Kusatsu	草津市	67.82	141,945	2092.97	
Maibara	米原市	250.46	38,473	153.61	
Moriyama	守山市	55.73	80,768	1449.27	
Nagahama	長浜市	680.79	119,043	174.86	
Ōmihachiman	近江八幡市	177.45	82,116	462.76	
Ōtsu (capital)	大津市	464.51	341,187	734.51	
Rittō	栗東市	52.75	67,149	1272.97	
Takashima	高島市	693	49,168	70.95	
Yasu	野洲市	80.15	50,233	626.74	

=== Towns ===
These are the towns in each district:

Name		Area (km^{2})	Population	Population density (per km^{2})	District	Map
Rōmaji	Kanji	Area (km^{2})	Population	Population density (per km^{2})	District	Map
Aishō	愛荘町	37.98	20,730	545.81	Echi District	
Hino	日野町	117.63	21,677	184.28	Gamō District	
Kōra	甲良町	13.66	6,932	507.47	Inukami District	
Ryūō	竜王町	44.52	12,130	272.46	Gamō District	
Taga	多賀町	135.93	7,382	54.31	Inukami District	
Toyosato	豊郷町	7.78	7,588	975.32	Inukami District	

== Politics ==
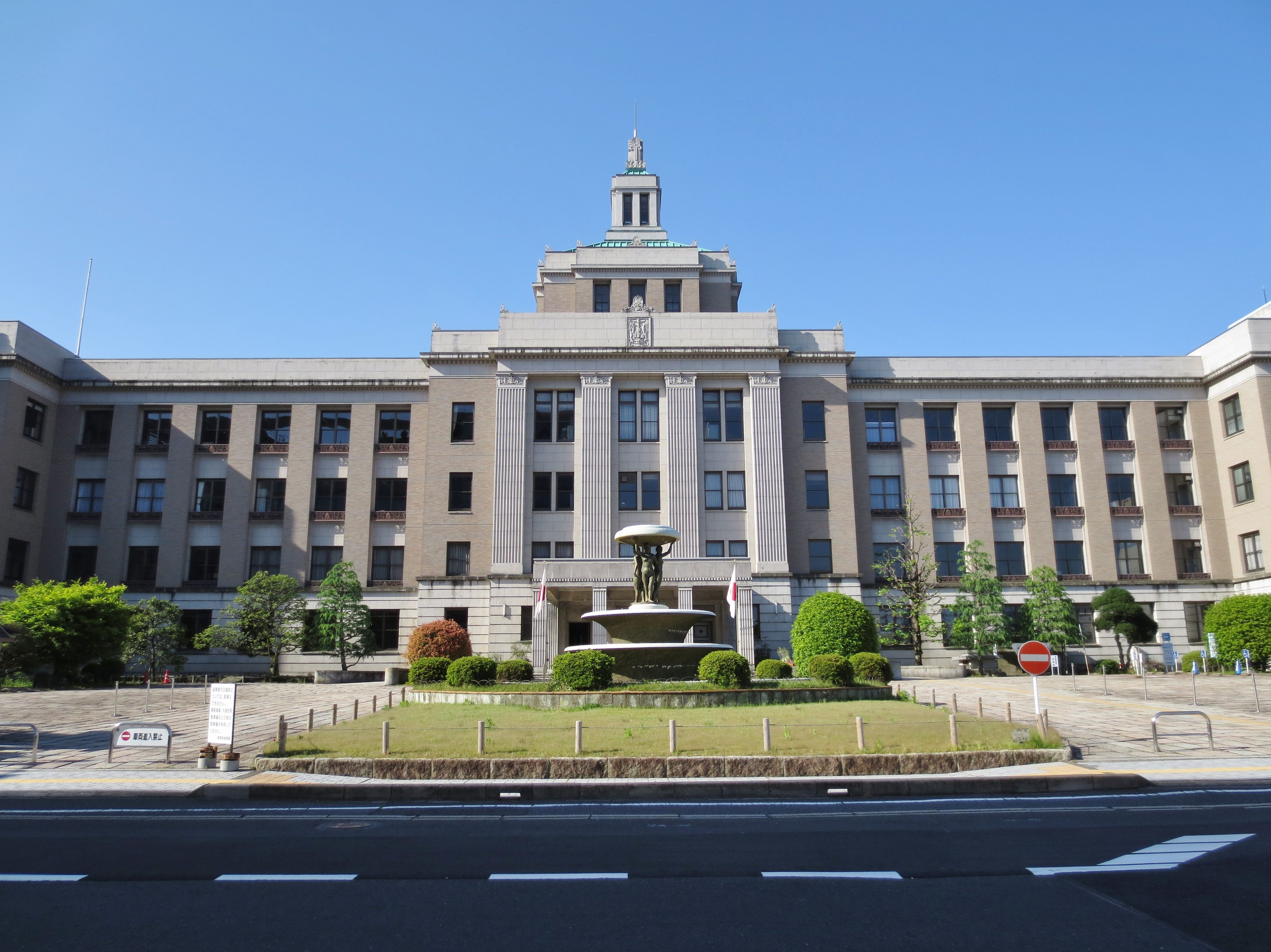
Ōtsu City's prefectural government building

Taizō Mikazuki, a former member of the House of Representatives from Shiga, was narrowly elected governor in July 2014 with center-left support against ex-METI-bureaucrat Takashi Koyari (supported by the center-right national-level ruling parties) to succeed governor Yukiko Kada. In June 2018, he was overwhelmingly reelected to a second term against one challenger, a communist.

The prefectural assembly has 44 members from 16 electoral districts, and is elected in unified local elections. As of July 2019, the assembly was composed by caucus as follows: LDP 20 members, Team Shiga (CDP, DPP, former Kada supporters etc.) 14, JCP 4, Sazanami Club (of independents) 3, Kōmeitō 2, "independent"/non-attached 1.

In the National Diet, Shiga is represented by four directly elected members of the House of Representatives and two (one per ordinary election) of the House of Councillors. For the proportional representation segment of the lower house, the prefecture forms part of the Kinki block. After the national elections of 2016, 2017 and 2019, the directly elected delegation to the Diet from Shiga consists of (as of August 1, 2019):

- in the House of Representatives
  - for the 1st district in the west: Toshitaka Ōoka, LDP, 3rd term,
  - for the 2nd district in the northeast: Ken'ichirō Ueno, LDP, 4th term,
  - for the 3rd district on the southern shores of Lake Biwa: Nobuhide Takemura, LDP, 3rd term,
  - for the 4th district in the southeast: Hiroo Kotera, LDP, 1st term,
- in the House of Councillors (Shiga At-large district)
  - in the class of 2016 (term ends 2022): Takashi Koyari, LDP, 1st term,
  - in the class of 2019 (term ends 2025): Yukiko Kada, independent sitting with the Hekisuikai caucus, 1st term.

== Economy ==
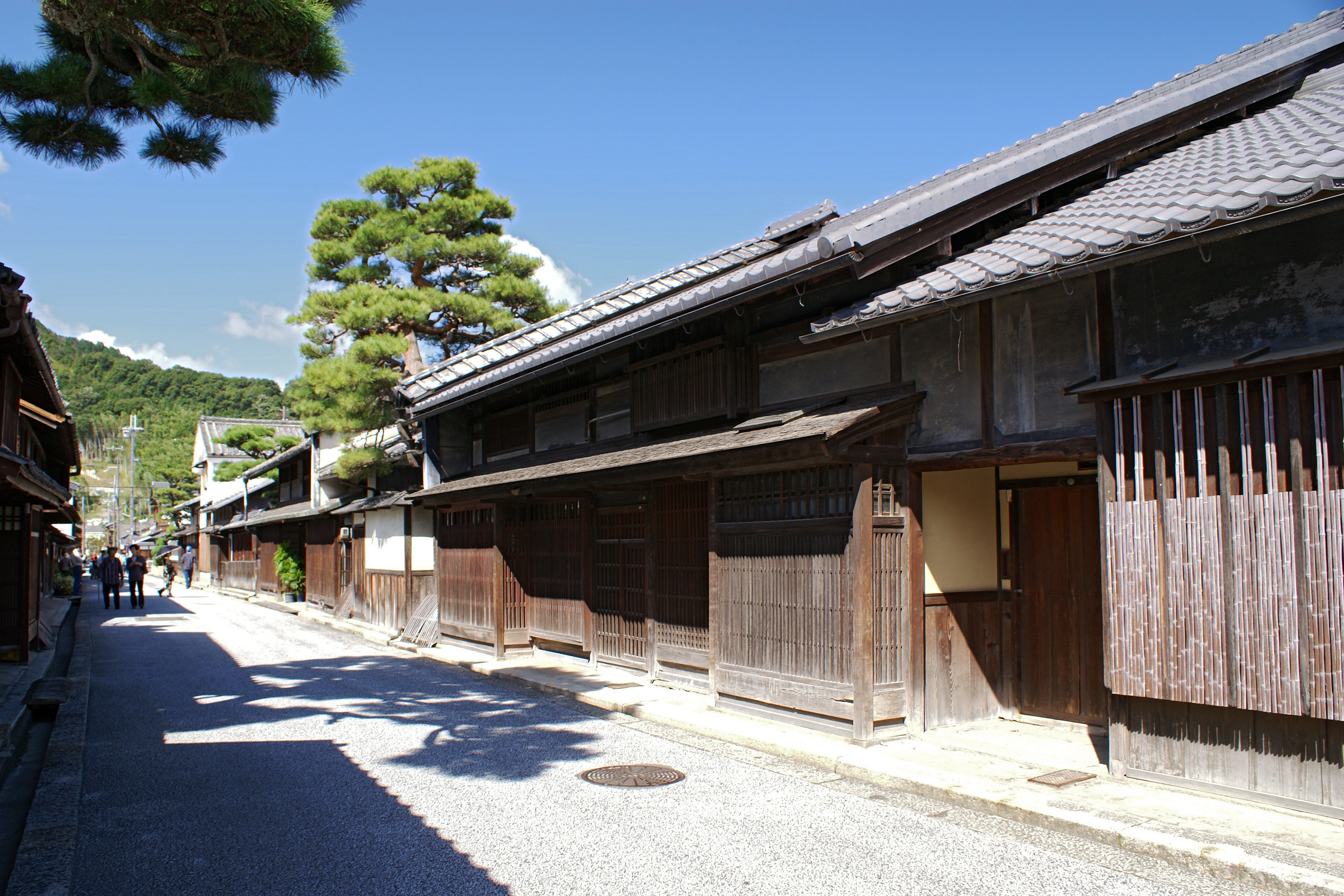
Merchant mansions in Omihachiman

According to the Cabinet Office's statistics in 2014, the manufacturing sector accounted for 35.4% of Shiga's economic production, the highest proportion in Japan.

== Demographics ==
Shiga prefecture population pyramid in 2020

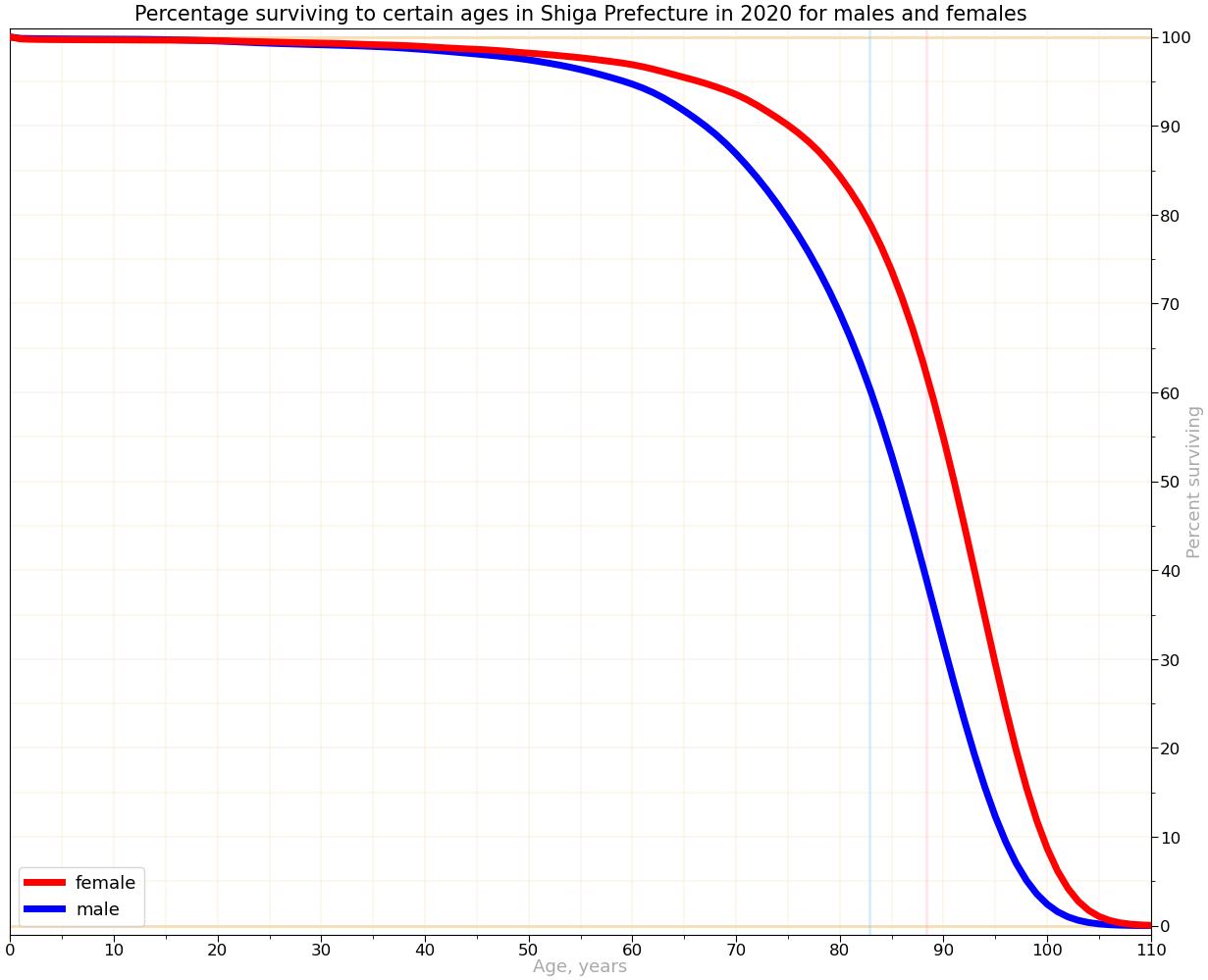
In 2020, Shiga Prefecture had the highest life expectancy fixed in Japan: 85.71 years

Historical population
Year	Pop.	±%
1920	651,050	—
1930	691,631	+6.2%
1940	703,679	+1.7%
1950	861,180	+22.4%
1960	842,695	−2.1%
1970	889,768	+5.6%
1980	1,079,898	+21.4%
1990	1,222,411	+13.2%
2000	1,342,832	+9.9%
2010	1,410,777	+5.1%
2015	1,412,916	+0.2%

The population is concentrated along the southern shore of Lake Biwa in Otsu city (adjacent to Kyoto) and along the lake's eastern shore in cities such as Kusatsu and Moriyama, which are within commuting distance to Kyoto. The lake's western and northern shores are more rural and resort-oriented with white sand beaches. In recent years, many Brazilians settled in Shiga to work in nearby factories. 25,040 foreigners live in Shiga and 30% of foreigners were Brazilians as of December 2016.

== Culture ==
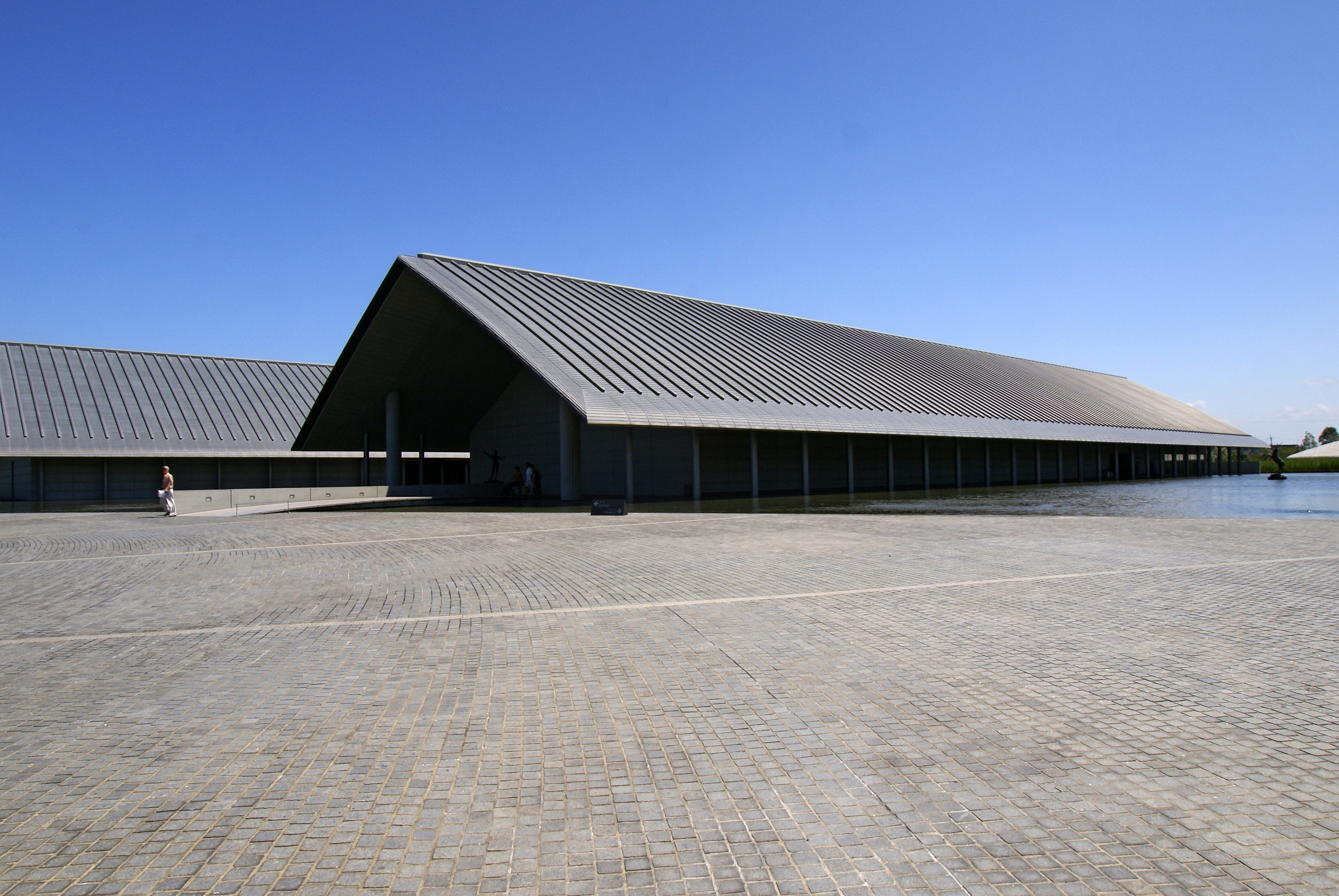
Sagawa Art Museum

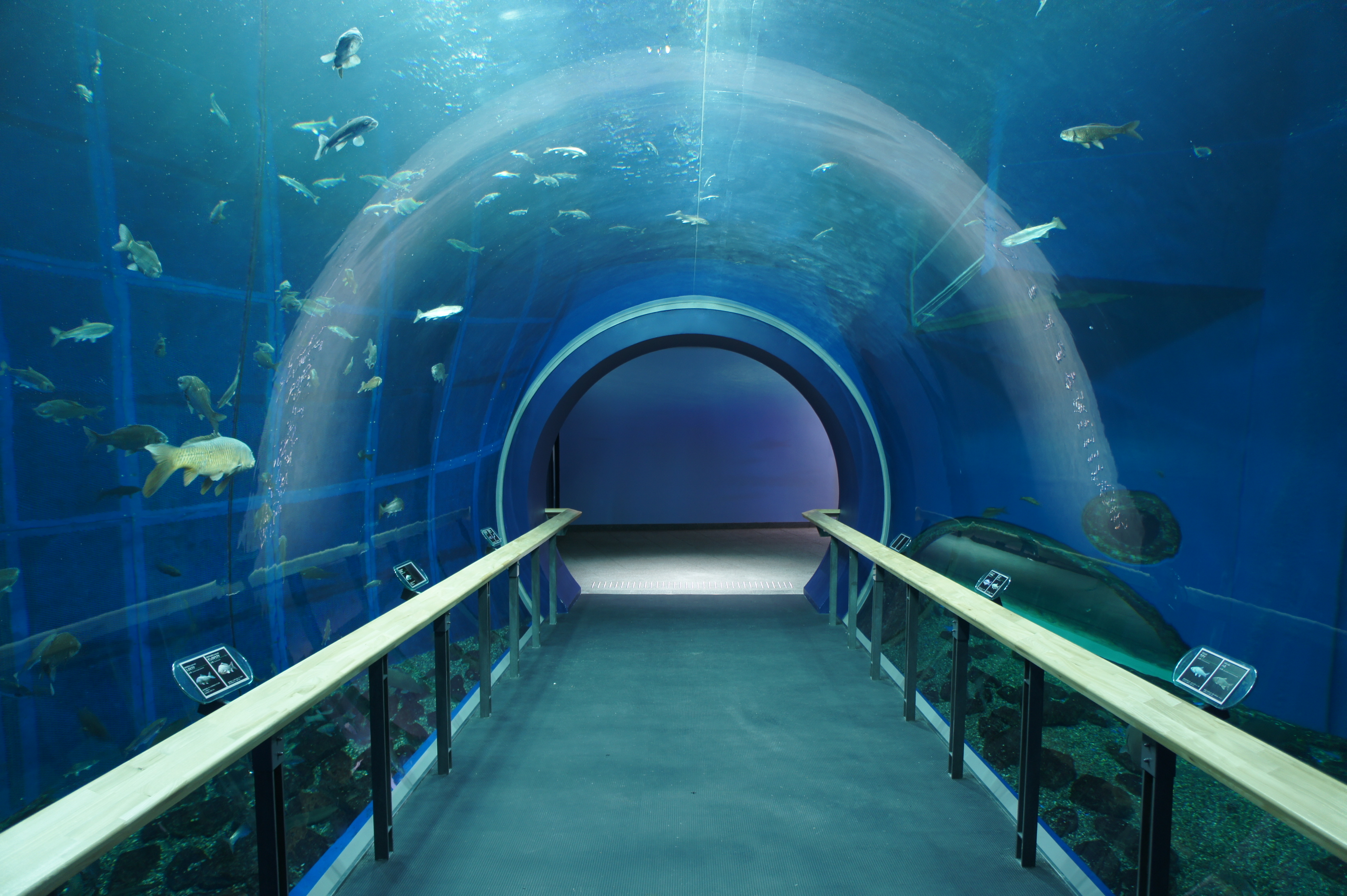
Aquarium of Lake Biwa Museum

Biwa Town (a part of Nagahama) is a home of The Tonda Traditional Bunraku Puppet Troupe.

Museums include the Sagawa Art Museum in Moriyama, the Lake Biwa Museum in Kusatsu and the Miho Museum in Kōka. In Kōka, a ninja house is preserved as a visitor center.

=== Education ===
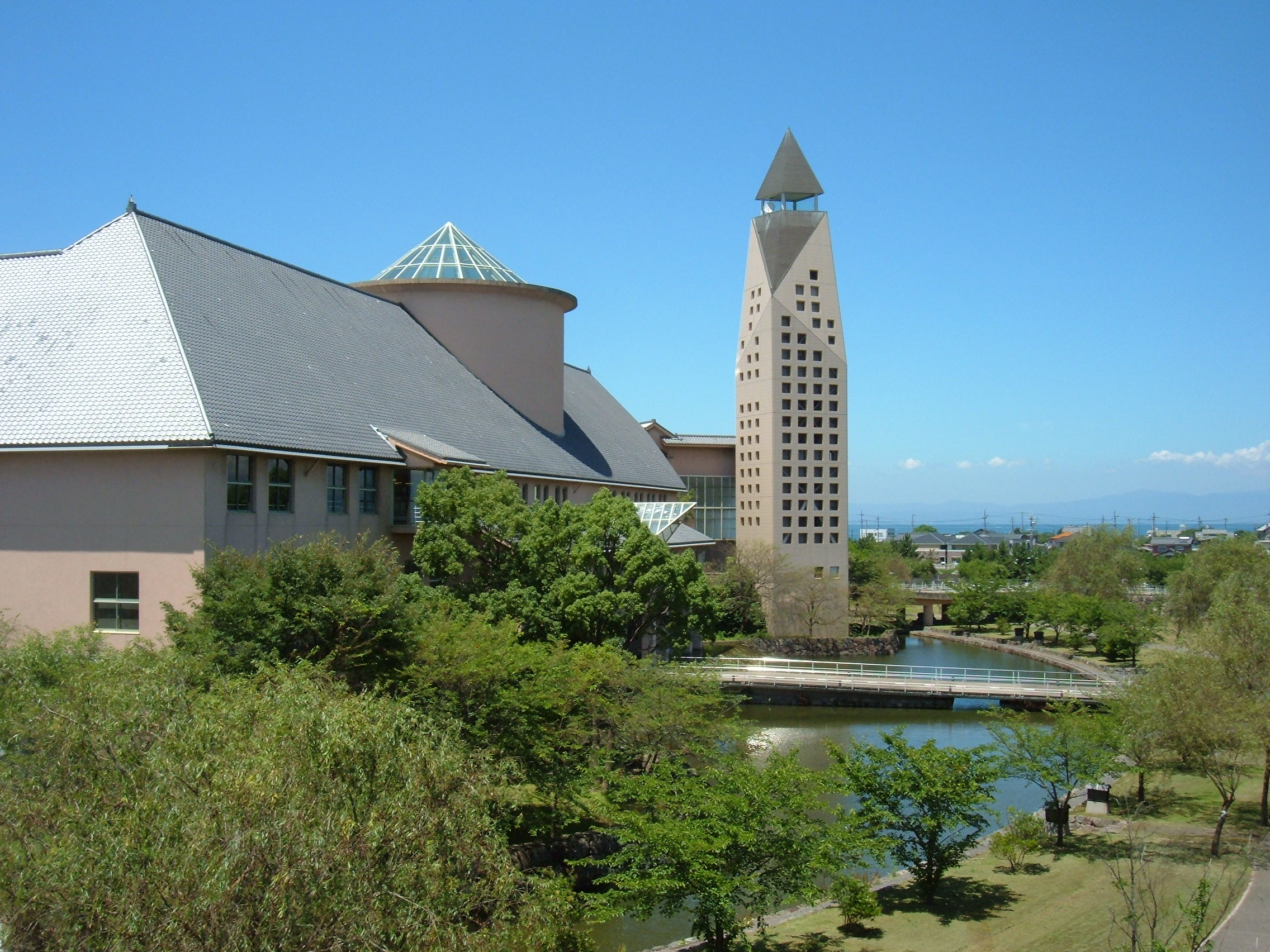
University of Shiga Prefecture

Ten universities, two junior colleges, and a learning center of The Open University of Japan operate in Shiga.

- Biwako-Gakuin University (Higashiomi)
- Biwako Seikei Sport College (Otsu)
- Nagahama Institute of Bio-Science and Technology (Nagahama)
- Ritsumeikan University (Kyoto and Kusatsu)
- Ryukoku University (Kyoto and Otsu)
- Seian University of Art and Design (Otsu)
- Seisen University (Hikone)
- Shiga Bunkyo Junior College (Nagahama)
- Shiga Junior College (Otsu)
- Shiga University (Hikone and Ōtsu)
- Shiga University of Medical Science (Otsu)
- University of Shiga Prefecture (Hikone)

An example of the educational content that is unique to Shiga Prefecture is Biwako Floating School, also known as Uminoko. Biwako Floating School is the project for running an educational cruise program in which fifth grade pupils of elementary schools living in Shiga board a ship Uminoko on Lake Biwa and learn about the environment and ecosystem of the lake.

=== Sports ===
The following sports teams are based in Shiga.

- Basketball: Shiga LakeStars
- Football (soccer): Lagend Shiga (Moriyama), MIO Biwako Kusastsu (later Reilac Shiga) (Kusatsu), Sagawa Shiga F.C. (Moriyama).
- Tennis: SHRIGGA AKA UVEAL
- Volleyball: Toray Arrows (women's volleyball team) (Otsu)

=== Transport ===
There are no airports within the prefecture itself. However, airports such as Chubu Centrair International Airport, Itami Airport, and Kansai International Airport are also used by air travellers from the prefecture.

== Tourism ==
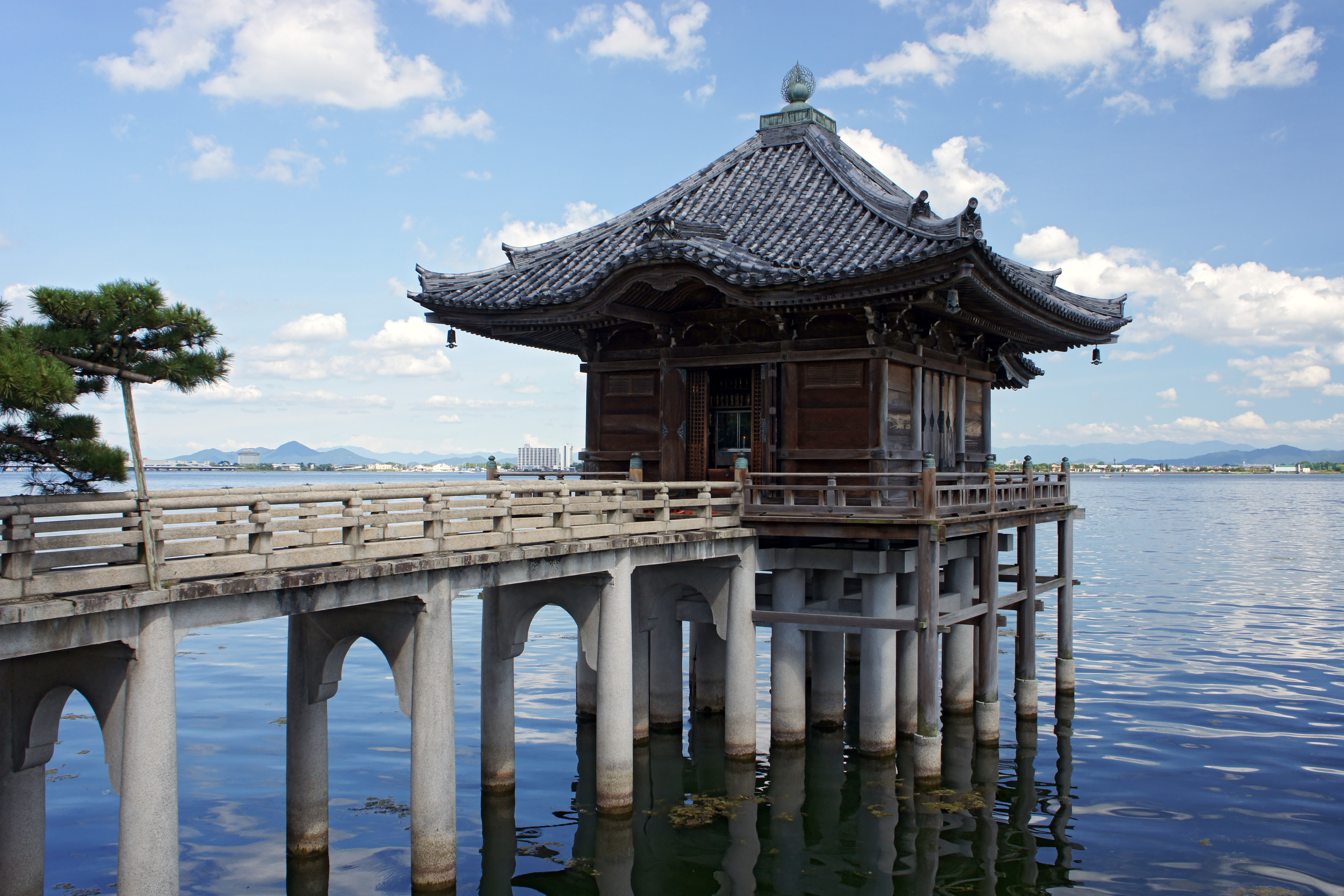
Ukimidō hall at Mangetsu-ji temple near Katata, Ōtsu

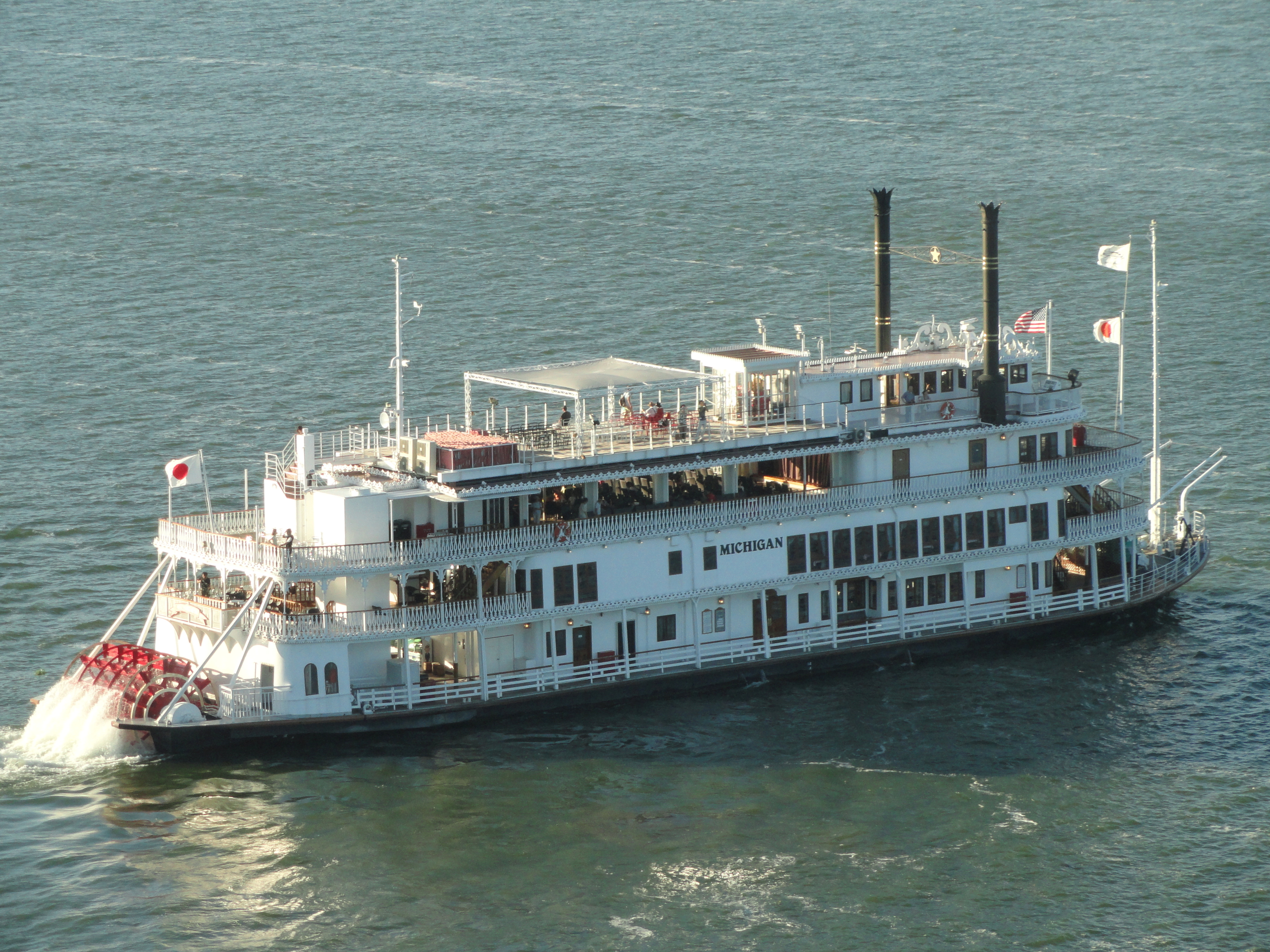
From Otsu port, the paddlewheeler Michigan offers cruises on Lake Biwa

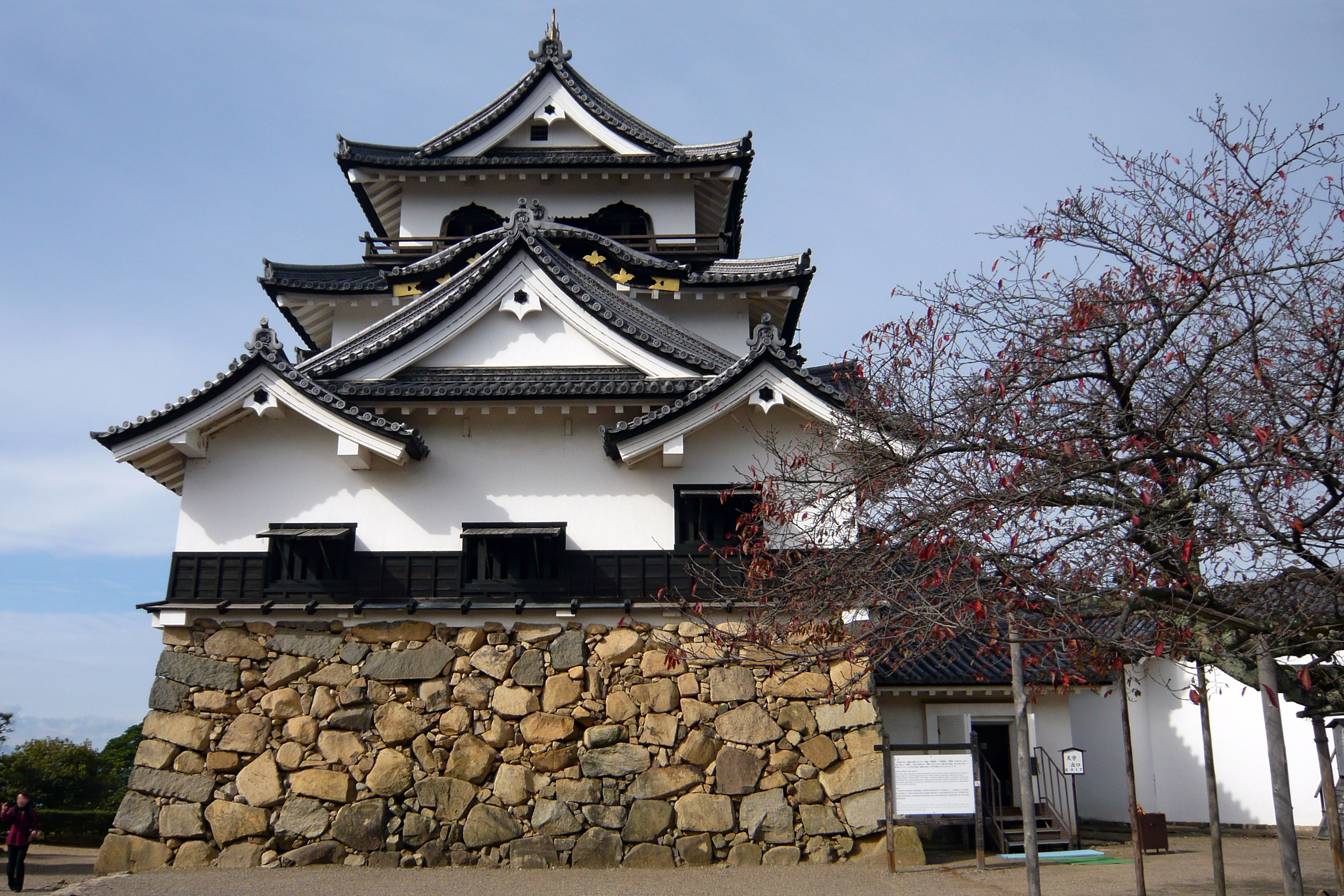
Hikone Castle

In 2000 sixty-five thousand tourists visited Shiga.

Festivals include the hikiyama matsuri (曳山祭; floats parade) festival, held in ten areas including Nagahama each April, one of the three major hikiyama festivals in Japan, which was designated an Important Intangible Cultural Property in 1979. During the festival ornate floats are mounted with miniature stages on which boys (playing both male and female roles) act in kabuki plays.

== Notable people ==
- Gentaro Kawase, president of Nippon Life Insurance.
- Hizaki, musician and songwriter.
- Kakuzo Kawamoto, business executive and politician.
- Kizo Yasui, business executive.
- Sōsuke Uno, the 75th Prime Minister of Japan.
- Takanori Nishikawa, singer and actor.

== Sister states/provinces ==
Shiga has cooperative agreements with three states or provinces in other countries.

- Hunan, China
- Michigan, United States, since 1968
- Rio Grande do Sul, Brazil
