= Yukiko Kada =

Japanese politician (born 1950)

- 嘉田 由紀子
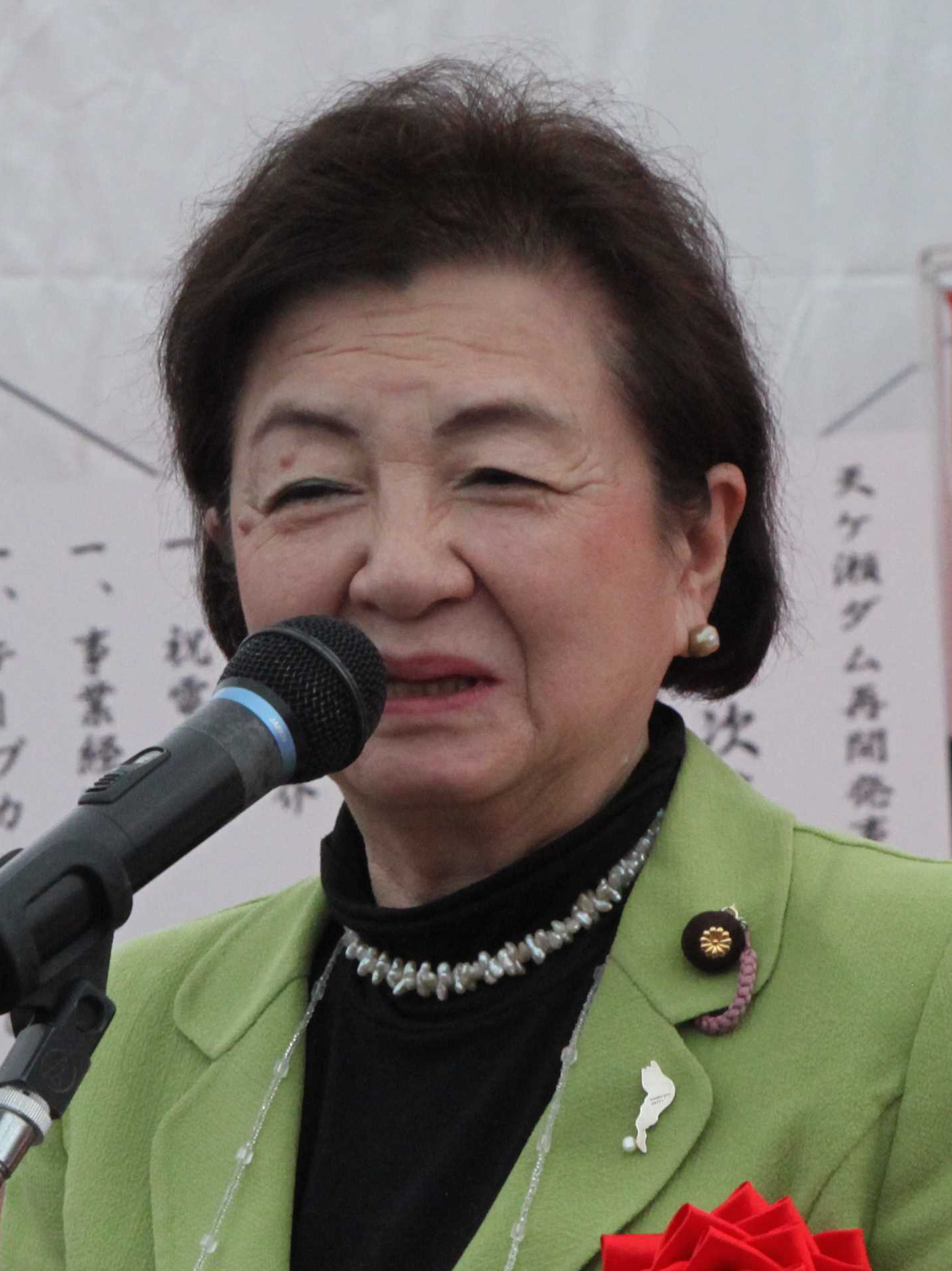
- Kada in 2023

Member of the House of Councillors
- Incumbent
- Assumed office 29 July 2019
- Preceded by: Takeshi Ninoyu
- Constituency: Shiga at-large (2019–2025); National PR (2025–present)

Governor of Shiga Prefecture
- In office 20 July 2006 – 19 July 2014
- Monarch: Akihito
- Preceded by: Yoshitsugu Kunimatsu
- Succeeded by: Taizō Mikazuki

Personal details
- Born: Yukiko Watanabe; 18 May 1950 (age 76) Honjō, Saitama, Japan
- Party: Innovation (since 2024)
- Other political affiliations: Independent (2006–2012; 2013–2018); TPJ (2012–2013); DPP (2018–2023); FEFA (2023–2024)
- Children: 2
- Education: Kyoto University; University of Wisconsin

Yukiko Kada (嘉田 由紀子, Kada Yukiko; born May 18, 1950) is a Japanese politician and member of the National Diet of Japan, serving as member of the House of Councillors from Shiga Prefecture since 2019. She was the governor of Shiga for two terms from 2006 to 2014.

== Early life ==
Kada is from Honjō, Saitama and her father was a member of the city council. She went to Kyoto University and studied environmental sociology. She moved to Ōtsu, Shiga in 1979. She graduated from the Graduate School of Agriculture of Kyoto University in 1981. She also studied in the United States at the University of Wisconsin as a graduate student in 1973. She became a professor at Kyoto Seika University in 2000.

== Political career ==
Kada was elected as governor of Shiga in 2006, defeating incumbent governor Yoshitsugu Kunimatsu. She became the first female governor of Shiga and only the fifth female governor in Japanese history. She then enjoyed a landslide re-election victory in 2010. Behind her popular campaign slogan mottainai (translating roughly to "Don't Waste"), Gov. Kada captured 420,000 votes, which was the largest total of any in the history of Shiga Prefecture's gubernatorial elections. She was supported by the Social Democratic Party (SDP) and led the Tomorrow Party of Japan (TPJ), which was founded shortly before the 2012 general election. The TPJ performed poorly in the election and all of its diet members except for Tomoko Abe left the party shortly afterwards, leading to the loss of its status as a national party. National party status in Japan requires five sitting diet members.

After the Shiga prefectural assembly passed a resolution requesting Kada to stop doubling as governor and the head of the TPJ, she resigned as head of the party on January 4, 2013.

In May 2014, Kada published a release on her official website stating her intention not to contest the election scheduled for July of that year. She was succeeded as governor by Taizō Mikazuki. After his election, she took over sole leadership of Team Shiga (チームしが, chīmu Shiga) from Mikazuki, the prefectural party founded to support Mikazuki's election and as of 2019, the second largest parliamentary group in Shiga's prefectural assembly where it includes local members of the national successors to the Democratic Party (CDP and DPFP).

In the 2017 election to the national House of Representatives, Kada stood in Shiga's constituency no. 1 as independent supported by the centre-left opposition (CDP, DPFP, JCP, SDP), but lost narrowly by about 5,000 votes to Liberal Democratic incumbent Toshitaka Ōoka. In the 2019 election to the national House of Councillors, she challenged Liberal Democratic incumbent Takeshi Ninoyu in Shiga and narrowly won by less than 14,000 votes prefecture-wide. Together with Takako Nagae, another opposition-supported independent, she formed the Hekisuikai parliamentary group.
