= Shiga at-large district =

Japanese House of Councillors constituency

- 滋賀県選挙区
- Parliamentary constituency for the House of Councillors
- Prefecture: Shiga
- Electorate: 1,152,633 (as of September 2022)

Current constituency
- Created: 1947
- Seats: 2
- Councillors: Class of 2019: Yukiko Kada (Ishin); Class of 2022: Takashi Koyari (LDP)

Shiga at-large district is a constituency in the House of Councillors of Japan, the upper house of the Diet of Japan (national legislature). It currently elects 2 members to the House of Councillors, 1 per election. The current representatives are:

- Takashi Koyari, first elected in 2016. Term ends in 2022. Member of the Liberal Democratic Party.
- Yukiko Kada, first elected in 2019. Term ends in 2025. Member of the Hekisuikai parliamentary group.

The district contains 1,154,108 eligible voters as of September 2020.

== Elected Councillors ==
Class of 1947	Election year	Class of 1950
(1947: 6-year term)	Election year	(1947: 3-year term)
Giichi Murakami (Ind.)	1947	Seiroku Ikai (Ind.)
Giichi Murakami (Ind.)	1947 by-el.	Jingoro Nishikawa (Liberal)
Giichi Murakami (Ind.)	1950	Jingoro Nishikawa (Liberal)
Giichi Murakami (Ryokufūkai)	1953	Jingoro Nishikawa (Liberal)
Giichi Murakami (Ryokufūkai)	1956	Jingoro Nishikawa (LDP)
Giichi Murakami (Ryokufūkai)	1959	Jingoro Nishikawa (LDP)
Giichi Murakami (Ryokufūkai)	1962	Jingoro Nishikawa (LDP)
Etsuzo Okumura (LDP)	1965	Jingoro Nishikawa (LDP)
Etsuzo Okumura (LDP)	1967 by-election	Sekikazu Nishimura (Socialist)
Etsuzo Okumura (LDP)	1968	Sekikazu Nishimura (Socialist)
Kakuzo Kawamoto (LDP)	1971	Sekikazu Nishimura (Socialist)
Kakuzo Kawamoto (LDP)	1974	Kunio Mochizuki (LDP)
Kakuzo Kawamoto (LDP)	1977	Kunio Mochizuki (LDP)
Kakuzo Kawamoto (LDP)	1980	Kozaburo Yamada (Ind.)
Kakuzo Kawamoto (LDP)	1983	Kozaburo Yamada (Ind.)
Kakuzo Kawamoto (LDP)	1986	Kozaburo Yamada (Ind.)
Eiichi Nakamura (Rengō no Kai)	1989	Kozaburo Yamada (Ind.)
Eiichi Nakamura (Rengō no Kai)	1992	Eisuke Kawamoto (LDP)
Tenzo Okumura (NP-Sakigake)	1995	Eisuke Kawamoto (LDP)
Tenzo Okumura (NP-Sakigake)	1998	Eisuke Kawamoto (LDP)
Hidetoshi Yamashita (LDP)	2000 by-el.	Eisuke Kawamoto (LDP)
Hidetoshi Yamashita (LDP)	2001	Eisuke Kawamoto (LDP)
Hidetoshi Yamashita (LDP)	2004	Kumiko Hayashi (Democratic)
Hisashi Tokunaga (Democratic)	2007	Kumiko Hayashi (Democratic)
Hisashi Tokunaga (Democratic)	2010	Kumiko Hayashi (Democratic)
Takeshi Ninoyu (LDP)	2013	Kumiko Hayashi (Democratic)
Takeshi Ninoyu (LDP)	2016	Takashi Koyari (LDP)
Yukiko Kada (Ind.)	2019	Takashi Koyari (LDP)
Yukiko Kada (Ind.)	2022	Takashi Koyari (LDP)
Kazuhiro Miyamoto (LDP)	2025	Takashi Koyari (LDP)

== Election results ==
2025
Party	Candidate	Votes	%	±%
LDP	Kazuhiro Miyamoto	202,850	30.26	
DPP	Akira Horie	161,272	24.05	
Ishin	Kyosuke Okaya	124,017	18.50	
Sanseitō	Ai Nakata	119,207	17.78	
JCP	Kohei Sato	50,097	7.47	
Anti-NHK	Yoshitaka Sugawara	7,635	1.14	
Party for Tax Reduction	Ryuichi Fujii	5,387	0.80	
Turnout				

2022
Party	Candidate	Votes	%	±%
LDP	Takashi Koyari (Incumbent)	315,249	51.64	
Independent	Issei Tajima	190,700	31.24	
JCP	Atsushi Ishido	51,742	8.48	
Sanseitō	Makoto Kataoka	35,839	5.87	
Anti-NHK	Hayato Tanoue	16,980	2.78	
Turnout				

2019
Party	Candidate	Votes	%	±%
Independent	Yukiko Kada	291,072	49.37	
LDP	Takeshi Ninoyu (Incumbent)	277,165	47.01	
Anti-NHK	Osamu Hattori	21,358	3.62	
Turnout				

2016
Party	Candidate	Votes	%	±%
LDP	Takashi Koyari	332,248	52.22	
Democratic	Kumiko Hayashi (Incumbent)	291,290	45.78	
Happiness Realization	Masashi Arakawa	12,705	2.00	
Turnout				

2013
Party	Candidate	Votes	%	±%
LDP	Takeshi Ninoyu	305,872	53.42	
Democratic	Hisashi Tokunaga (Incumbent)	167,399	29.24	
JCP	Ikuo Tsubota	86,587	15.12	
Happiness Realization	Masashi Arakawa	12,731	2.22	
Turnout				

2010
Party	Candidate	Votes	%	±%
Democratic	Kumiko Hayashi (Incumbent)	317,756	48.63	
LDP	Nobuhide Takemura	210,958	32.29	
JCP	Takashi Kawauchi	64,962	9.94	
Independent	Osamu Konishi	59,702	9.14	
Turnout				

2007
Party	Candidate	Votes	%	±%
Democratic	Hisashi Tokunaga	325,365	50.23	
LDP	Hidetoshi Yamashita (Incumbent)	263,067	40.62	
JCP	Ikuo Tsubota	59,275	9.15	
Turnout				

2004
Party	Candidate	Votes	%	±%
Democratic	Kumiko Hayashi	290,660	48.02	
LDP	Kenichiro Ueno	251,196	41.50	
JCP	Toshiro Hayashi	63,391	10.47	
Turnout				

2001
Party	Candidate	Votes	%	±%
LDP	Hidetoshi Yamashita (Incumbent)	322,322	54.97	
Democratic	Shunyū Norikumo	163,840	27.94	
JCP	Takashi Kawauchi	66,295	11.31	
Liberal League	Midori Kitada	33,916	5.78	
Turnout				

2000 by-election
Party	Candidate	Votes	%	±%
LDP	Hidetoshi Yamashita	205,365	48.36	
Democratic	Shunyū Norikumo	156,191	36.78	
JCP	Takashi Kawauchi	63,099	14.86	
Turnout				

1998
Party	Candidate	Votes	%	±%
LDP	Eisuke Kawamoto (Incumbent)	286,369	46.15	
Independent	Takashi Ōkubo	174,789	28.17	
JCP	Toshiro Hayashi	129,664	20.89	
Liberal League	Seiichi Kato	29,755	4.79	
Turnout				

1995
Party	Candidate	Votes	%	±%
NP-Sakigake	Tenzo Okumura	192,401	43.36	
Independent	Saburo Takada	189,602	42.73	
JCP	Takashi Kawauchi	61,741	13.91	
Turnout				

1992
Party	Candidate	Votes	%	±%
LDP	Eisuke Kawamoto	270,426	50.29	
Minkairen	Sukehiko Matsui	217,823	40.51	
JCP	Takashi Kawauchi	49,518	9.21	
Turnout				

1989
Party	Candidate	Votes	%	±%
Minkairen	Eiichi Nakamura	289,120	46.57	
LDP	Kakuzo Kawamoto (Incumbent)	269,042	43.33	
JCP	Toshiro Hayashi	62,703	10.10	
Turnout				

1986
Party	Candidate	Votes	%	±%
Independent	Kozaburo Yamada (Incumbent)	330,991	54.99	
LDP	Shigeyuki Ueda	187,138	31.09	
JCP	Toshiro Hayashi	83,753	13.92	
Turnout				

1983
Party	Candidate	Votes	%	±%
LDP	Kakuzo Kawamoto (Incumbent)	247,916	51.88	
Socialist	Tsutomu Yamamoto	99,156	20.75	
Democratic Socialist	Nobuo Hoshi	74,357	15.56	
JCP	Toshiro Hayashi	56,479	11.82	
Turnout				

1980
Party	Candidate	Votes	%	±%
Independent	Kozaburo Yamada	237,346	44.19	
LDP	Kunio Mochizuki (Incumbent)	228,559	42.55	
JCP	Hisako Kiriyama	71,240	13.26	
Turnout				

1977
Party	Candidate	Votes	%	±%
LDP	Kakuzo Kawamoto (Incumbent)	276,245	54.32	
Socialist	Mikiko Ueda	169,566	33.34	
JCP	Eiji Wadokoro	47,062	9.25	
Socialist Democratic	Toshio Kitano	15,689	3.08	
Turnout				

1974
Party	Candidate	Votes	%	±%
LDP	Kunio Mochizuki	201,099	41.22	
Socialist	Toshio Goto	143,522	29.42	
JCP	Eiji Wadokoro	62,994	12.91	
Democratic Socialist	Norihisa Nishikawa	41,927	8.59	
Komeito	Kazuyoshi Ichii	34,873	7.15	
Independent	Itsuji Okada	3,428	0.70	
Turnout				
