= Kumiko Hayashi =

Japanese politician

- 林 久美子
- Official portrait, 2009

Member of the House of Councillors
- In office 26 July 2004 – 25 July 2016
- Preceded by: Eisuke Kawamoto
- Succeeded by: Takashi Koyari
- Constituency: Shiga at-large

Personal details
- Born: 7 September 1972 (age 54) Yōkaichi, Shiga, Japan
- Party: DPJ (2004–2016)
- Other political affiliations: DP (2016)
- Spouse: Hiroshige Sekō (m. 2013)
- Education: Waseda University

Kumiko Hayashi (林 久美子, Hayashi Kumiko; born 7 September 1972) is a Japanese politician of the Democratic Party of Japan, a member of the House of Councillors in the Diet (national legislature).

== Career ==
A native of Shiga Prefecture, she was elected for the first time in 2004. Her husband is Hiroshige Seko.
