= Ehime 1st district =

Legislative district of Japan

Ehime 1st District
- Parliamentary constituency for the Japanese House of Representatives
- Numbered map of Ehime Prefecture single-member districts
- Prefecture: Ehime
- Proportional District: Shikoku
- Electorate: 426,322

Current constituency
- Created: 1994
- Seats: One
- Party: LDP
- Representative: Akihisa Shiozaki
- Municipalities: Matsuyama

Ehime 1st district (愛媛県第1区, Ehime-ken dai-ikku or simply 愛媛1区, Ehime-ikku) is a single-member constituency of the House of Representatives in the national Diet of Japan located in Ehime Prefecture.

== List of representatives ==
Election	Representative	Party	Dates	Notes
1996	Katsutsugu Sekiya	LDP	1996–2000	
2000	Yasuhisa Shiozaki	LDP	2000–2021	
2003	Yasuhisa Shiozaki	LDP	2000–2021	
2005	Yasuhisa Shiozaki	LDP	2000–2021	
2009	Yasuhisa Shiozaki	LDP	2000–2021	
2012	Yasuhisa Shiozaki	LDP	2000–2021	
2014	Yasuhisa Shiozaki	LDP	2000–2021	
2017	Yasuhisa Shiozaki	LDP	2000–2021	
2021	Akihisa Shiozaki	LDP	2021–present	
2024	Akihisa Shiozaki	LDP	2021–present	
2026	Akihisa Shiozaki	LDP	2021–present	

== Election results ==
2026
Party	Candidate	Votes	%	±%
LDP	Akihisa Shiozaki	127,770	60.4	▲6.4
DPP	Tomoe Ishii	46,245	21.9	▼2.9
Sanseitō	Ai Shinotō	23,828	11.3	
JCP	Tsukasa Wada	13,718	6.5	▲1.6
Registered electors		416,864		
Turnout			52.43	▲4.83
LDP hold				

2024
Party	Candidate	Votes	%	±%
LDP	Akihisa Shiozaki	105,498	54.0	▼6.8
DPP	Tomoe Ishii (elected in Shikoku PR)	48,393	24.8	
CDP	Yoshimichi Kōsogabe	31,790	16.3	▼22.9
JCP	Kenichi Ishimoto	9,608	4.9	
Registered electors		419,917		
Turnout			47.60	▼4.50
LDP hold				

2021
Party	Candidate	Votes	%	±%
LDP	Akihisa Shiozaki	119,633	60.81	▼4.02
CDP	Toshirō Tomochika	77,091	39.19	New
Registered electors		385,321		
Turnout			52.10	▲6.13

2017
Party	Candidate	Votes	%	±%
LDP	Yasuhisa Shiozaki (Incumbent)	112,930	64.83	▲11.23
Kibō	Kiyo Tominaga	42,600	24.45	New
JCP	Kenichi Ishimoto	18,675	10.72	▲4.30
Registered electors		386,883		
Turnout			45.97	▼2.18

2014
Party	Candidate	Votes	%	±%
LDP	Yasuhisa Shiozaki (Incumbent)	99,900	53.60	▲1.93
DPJ	Takako Nagae	74,508	39.98	▲17.95
JCP	Katsuhiko Tanaka	11,975	6.42	▲2.00
Registered electors		393,115		
Turnout			48.15	▼9.91

2012
Party	Candidate	Votes	%	±%
LDP	Yasuhisa Shiozaki (Incumbent)	115,798	51.67	▲3.07
DPJ	Takako Nagae (Incumbent-Shikoku-PR)	49,382	22.03	▼25.54
JRP	Toshihide Ikemoto	48,171	21.49	New
JCP	Katsuhiko Tanaka	9,902	4.42	▲1.42
Indep.	Akihiro Kōri	875	0.39	▲0.17
Turnout			58.06	

2009
Party	Candidate	Votes	%	±%
LDP	Yasuhisa Shiozaki (Incumbent)	130,330	48.60	▼11.82
DPJ	Takako Nagae (elected by Shikoku-PR)	127,562	47.57	▲21.32
JCP	Katsuhiko Tanaka	8,035	3.00	▼2.60
HRP	Kōjiro Tanimura	1,822	0.62	New
Indep.	Akihiro Kōri	578	0.22	New
Turnout				

2005
Party	Candidate	Votes	%	±%
LDP	Yasuhisa Shiozaki (Incumbent)	138,068	60.42	▼0.19
DPJ	Akira Tamai	59,985	26.25	▲2.81
SDP	Hitoshi Noguchi	14,380	6.29	▲0.07
JCP	Katsuhiko Tanaka	12,788	5.60	▼1.99
Indep.	Yasushi Oka	3,277	1.43	▼0.71
Turnout				

2003
Party	Candidate	Votes	%	±%
LDP	Yasuhisa Shiozaki (Incumbent)	113,516	60.61	▲6.32
DPJ	Akira Tamai	43,903	23.44	▼2.57
JCP	Noriko Hayashi	14,222	7.59	▼1.12
SDP	Yoshiko Nagawa	11,653	6.22	▼2.03
Indep.	Yasushi Oka	4,007	2.14	New
Turnout				

2000
Party	Candidate	Votes	%	±%
LDP	Yasuhisa Shiozaki	108,655	54.29	▲8.95
DPJ	Mayumi Utsunomiya	52,046	26.01	New
JCP	Noriko Hayashi	17,429	8.71	▼0.04
SDP	Yoshiko Nagawa	16,512	8.25	New
LL	Hiroyuki Ōta	5,485	2.74	New
Turnout				

1996
Party	Candidate	Votes	%	±%
LDP	Katsutsugu Sekiya	90,305	45.34	New
NFP	Tokihiro Nakamura	85,794	43.07	New
JCP	Izumi Sasaki	17,437	8.75	New
NSP	Kiyonobu Nakajima	5,652	2.84	New
Turnout				
