= Kakuzo Kawamoto =

- 河本 嘉久蔵

Director-General of the National Land Agency
- In office 1 November 1984 – 28 December 1985
- Prime Minister: Yasuhiro Nakasone
- Preceded by: Sakonshirō Inamura
- Succeeded by: Heihachirō Yamazaki

Director-General of Hokkaido Development Agency
- In office 1 November 1984 – 28 December 1985
- Prime Minister: Yasuhiro Nakasone
- Preceded by: Sakonshirō Inamura
- Succeeded by: Raishirō Koga

Member of the House of Councillors
- In office 4 July 1971 – 9 July 1989
- Preceded by: Etsuzō Okumura
- Succeeded by: Eiichi Nakamura
- Constituency: Shiga at-large

Personal details
- Born: 27 March 1917 Takashima, Shiga, Japan
- Died: 24 March 1990 (aged 72) Kyoto, Japan
- Party: Liberal Democratic
- Children: Eisuke Kawamoto
- Relatives: Kawamoto Niwa (grandmother)
- Education: Hikone Commercial College

Kakuzo Kawamoto (河本 嘉久蔵, kawamoto Kakuzo; 27 March 1917 – 24 March 1990) was a Japanese business executive and politician.

== Career ==
Kakuzo Kawamoto was born in Takashima District, Shiga on 27 March 1917. He graduated from Hikone Commercial College (later, Shiga University) in 1937. In 1946, he founded Yamashiro Orimono (later, Ayaha Corporation) and became the president. In 1965, he founded Ayaha High School on the property of the Kusatsu factory of Ayaha Spinning (later, Ayaha Corporation) for the junior high school graduates working for Ayaha Spinning.

He was elected as a member of the House of Councillors in 1971. He served as Vice Minister of International Trade and Industry, Vice Minister of Agriculture, Forestry and Forestry, Chairperson of Budget Committee of the House of Councilors. He assumed the position of Director General of National Land Agency (国土庁 Kokudo-chō) and Director General of Hokkaido Development Agency (北海道開発庁 Hokkaidō-kaihatsu-chō) of the first reshuffled cabinet in the second Nakasone's cabinet in 1984. In 1987, he was awarded the Grand Cordon of the Order of the Sacred Treasure.

In 1989, he was defeated although he ran in the election from Liberal Democratic Party.

In 1980, his son, Hidenori Kawamoto who has served as the president of Ayaha Corporation, the chairperson of Ayaha High School, the vice chairperson of Ōtsu Chamber of Commerce and Industry, the chairperson of Shiga Sport Association and so on, established Public-interest Incorporated Foundation "Kawamoto Promotion Association for Educational Welfare" ("河本文教福祉振興会") for the purpose of contributing to the sound upbringing of children and youth in Shiga Prefecture according to the suggestion and benevolence of Kakuzo Kawamoto by donating his personal fortune.

His grandmother, Niwa Kawamoto (1863–1976) used to be the world's top person for longevity.
