= Takeshi Noma (politician, 1934–2023) =

Japanese politician (1934–2023)

- 野間 赳
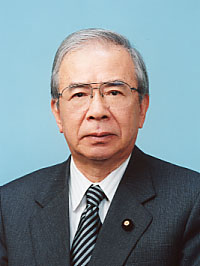
- Official portrait, 2001

Member of the House of Councillors
- In office 26 July 1992 – 25 July 2004
- Preceded by: Yukio Nakagawa
- Succeeded by: Junzo Yamamoto
- Constituency: Ehime at-large

Speaker of the Ehime Prefectural Assembly
- In office 16 March 1990 – 29 April 1991

Member of the Ehime Prefectural Assembly
- In office 1972–1992
- Constituency: Imabari City

Personal details
- Born: 3 April 1934 Imabari, Ehime, Japan
- Died: 11 March 2023 (aged 88) Imabari, Ehime, Japan
- Party: Liberal Democratic
- Education: Meiji University

Takeshi Noma (Japanese: 野間赳 Noma Takeshi; 3 April 1934 – 11 March 2023) was a Japanese politician. A member of the Liberal Democratic Party, he served in the House of Councillors from 1992 to 2004.

Noma died on 11 March 2023, at the age of 88.
