= Kutsuki-Katsuragawa Prefectural Natural Park =

Natural park of Shiga prefecture, Japan

- 朽木・葛川県立自然公園
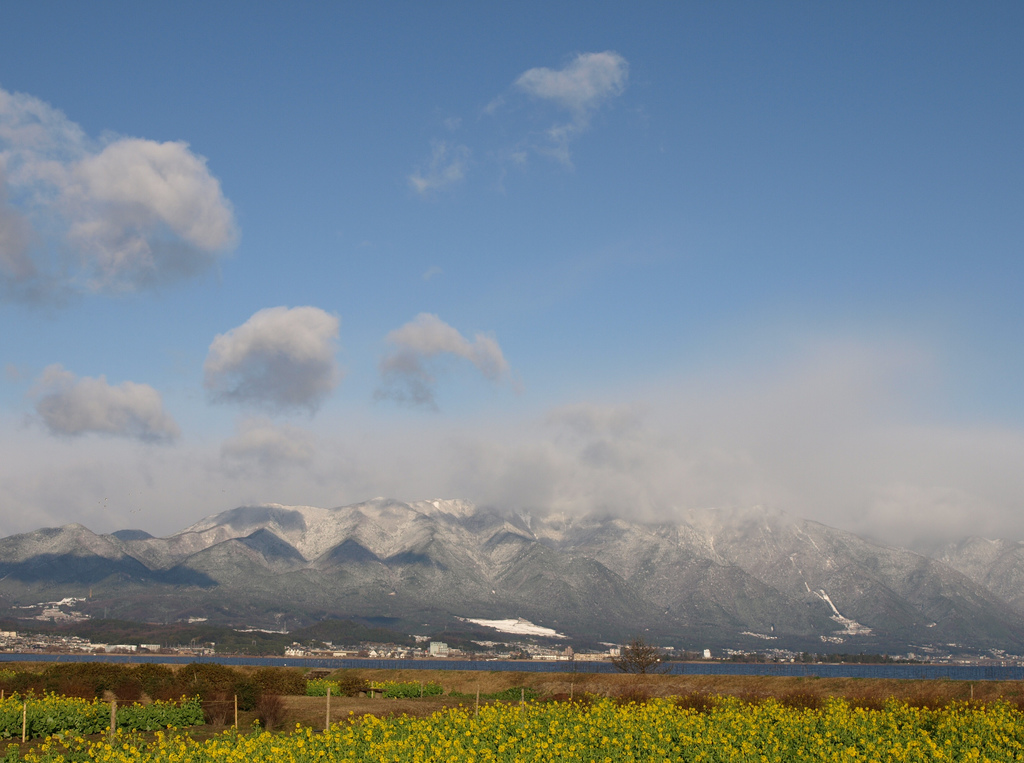
- Hira Mountains
- Interactive map of Kutsuki-Katsuragawa Prefectural Natural Park
- Location: Shiga Prefecture, Japan
- Area: 143.41 km^{2} (55.37 sq mi)
- Established: 8 October 1971

Kutsuki-Katsuragawa Prefectural Natural Park (朽木・葛川県立自然公園, Kutsuki-Katsuragawa kenritsu shizen kōen) is a Prefectural Natural Park in the mountains of western Shiga Prefecture, Japan. Established in 1971, the park spans the borders of the municipalities of Ōtsu and Takashima.

== See also ==
- National Parks of Japan
- Biwako Quasi-National Park
