= Mangetsu-ji =

Buddhist temple in Shiga Prefecture, Japan

- 満月寺
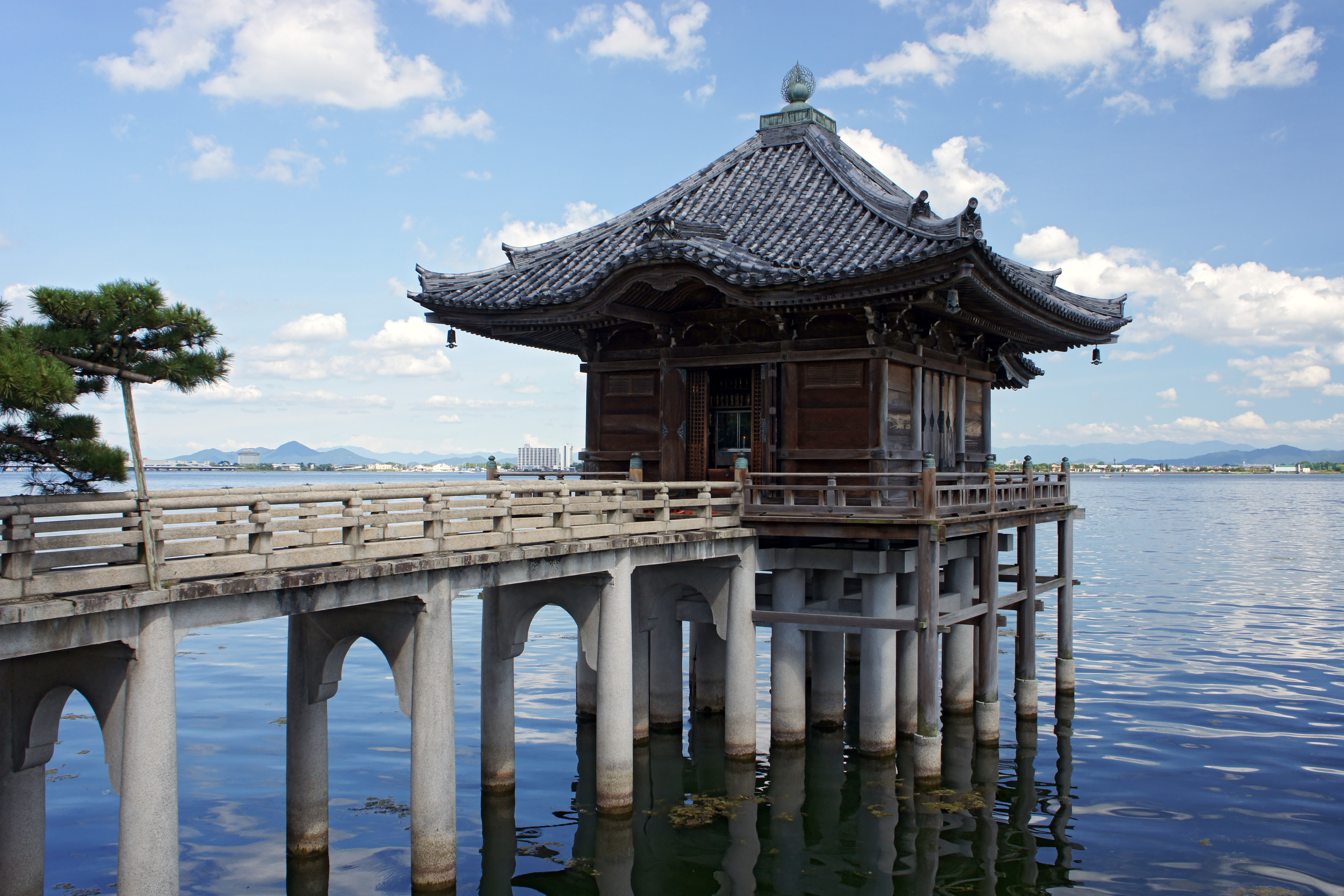
- Mangetsu-ji Ukimidō, overlooking Lake Biwa

- Location within Japan

Religion
- Affiliation: Buddhist
- Prefecture: Shiga

Location
- Location: Ōtsu
- Country: Japan
- Interactive map of Mangetsu-ji
- Prefecture: Shiga
- Coordinates: 35°6′35.3″N 135°55′15.4″E

Mangetsu-ji (満月寺) is a temple beside Lake Biwa in Ōtsu, Shiga Prefecture, Japan. The Heian period statue of Shō Kannon is an Important Cultural Property.

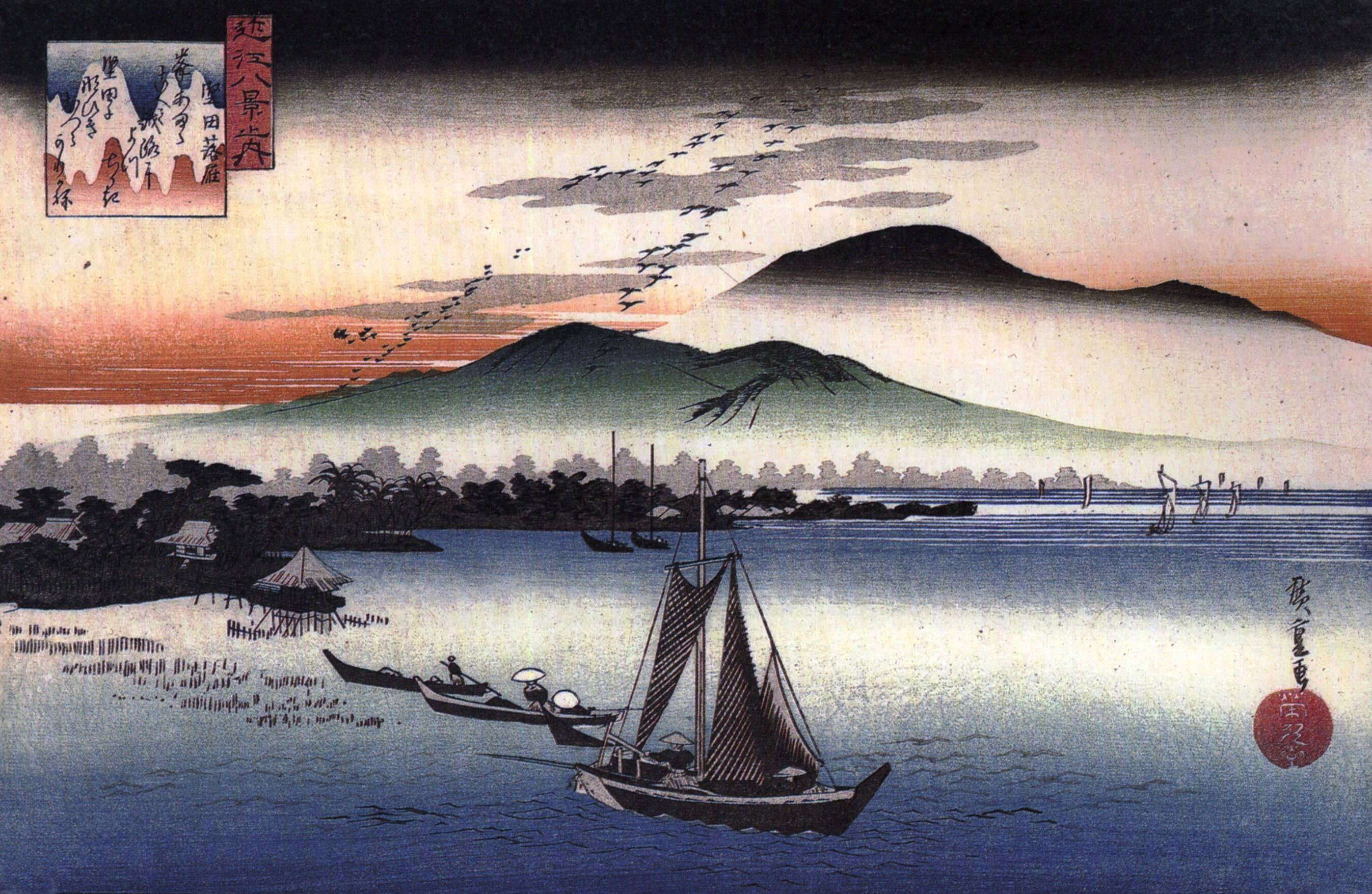
The wild geese returning home at Katata (堅田の落雁), by Hiroshige

The temple, specifically the Ukimidō "floating temple" hall, features in one of the remaining views of the Eight Views of Ōmi, originally drawn by Hiroshige. The print featuring the temple is "The wild geese returning home at Katata" (堅田の落雁).

== Access ==
The temple can be reached from the Katata Station (on the JR West Lake West line (Kosei Line), JR西日本湖西線) via bus. On weekends there is a bus directly to the temple, while on weekdays the nearest stop is Demachi 出町, followed by a 7-minute walk.

== Registered buildings ==
- Kannondō (観音堂) (1766)
- Kyakuden (客殿) (1754)
- Sanmon (山門) (1812)
- Chashitsu (茶室) (1937)
- Ukimidō (浮御堂) (1937)
Several views around Mangetsu-ji in 2014

== See also ==
- Enryaku-ji
- Ishiyama-dera
- Mii-dera
