= Yasuhisa Shiozaki =

Japanese politician (born 1950)

- 塩崎 恭久
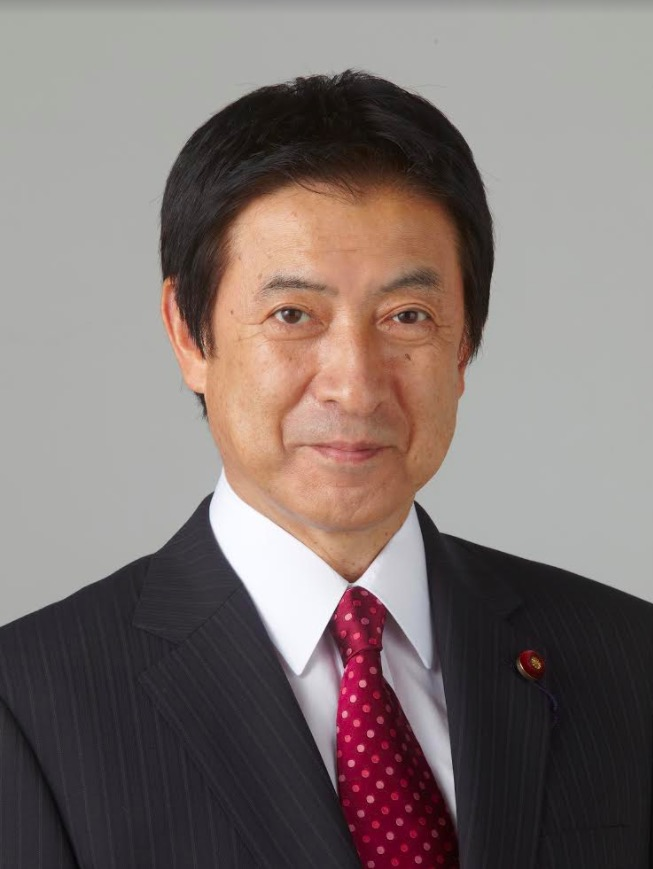
- Official portrait, 2014

Minister of Health, Labour and Welfare
- In office 3 September 2014 – 3 August 2017
- Prime Minister: Shinzo Abe
- Preceded by: Norihisa Tamura
- Succeeded by: Katsunobu Katō

Chief Cabinet Secretary
- In office 26 September 2006 – 27 August 2007
- Prime Minister: Shinzo Abe
- Preceded by: Shinzo Abe
- Succeeded by: Kaoru Yosano

Member of the House of Representatives
- In office 25 June 2000 – 14 October 2021
- Preceded by: Katsutsugu Sekiya
- Succeeded by: Akihisa Shiozaki
- Constituency: Ehime 1st
- In office 18 July 1993 – 6 July 1995
- Preceded by: Jun Shiozaki
- Succeeded by: Constituency abolished (1996)
- Constituency: Former Ehime 1st

Member of the House of Councillors
- In office 23 July 1995 – 11 May 2000
- Preceded by: Osamu Ikeda
- Succeeded by: Katsutsugu Sekiya
- Constituency: Ehime at-large

Personal details
- Born: 7 November 1950 (age 75) Matsuyama, Ehime, Japan
- Party: Liberal Democratic
- Children: Akihisa Shiozaki
- Parent: Jun Shiozaki (father)
- Education: University of Tokyo; John F. Kennedy School of Government; Harvard University

Yasuhisa Shiozaki (塩崎 恭久, Shiozaki Yasuhisa; born 7 November 1950) is a Japanese politician who served as Chief Cabinet Secretary to Prime Minister Shinzo Abe until August 2007.

== Early career ==
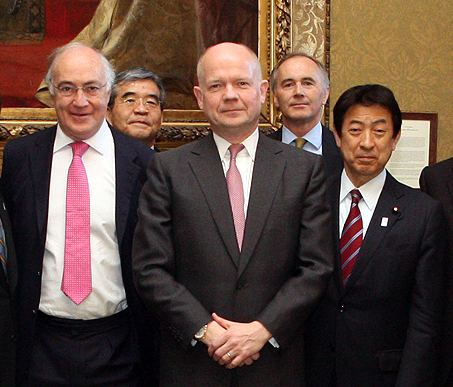
Shiozaki with Michael Howard, William Hague, Hirotsugu Aida and Tim Hitchens in 2013

Born in Matsuyama, Ehime Prefecture, he was an AFS exchange student in high school when he lived in Marin County California and attended Redwood High School, graduated with a liberal arts degree from the University of Tokyo and attended the John F. Kennedy School of Government at Harvard University. He spent three years working at the Economic Planning Agency (of which his father, Jun Shiozaki, was then director) and at the Bank of Japan. He then worked as a secretary to his father.

== Political career ==
Following his father's resignation, he ran for the Diet in 1993 and was elected to represent the first district of Ehime. He served as Vice Minister of Foreign Affairs in the 2005 cabinet of Junichiro Koizumi and was appointed Chief Cabinet Secretary on 26 September 2006, and held the position until a cabinet shuffle at the end of August 2007.

His appointment as Minister of Health, Labor and Welfare in the second Abe administration was announced on 3 September 2014.

Shiozaki's profile on the LDP website:

- Bank of Japan
- Parliamentary Vice-Minister of Finance (Hashimoto Cabinet)
- Senior Vice-Minister for Foreign Affairs (Koizumi Cabinet)
- Chief Cabinet Secretary (Abe Cabinet)
- Minister of State for Abduction issue (Abe Cabinet)
- Acting Chairman, Policy Research Council

== Political positions ==
Like most member of Shinzo Abe's Cabinet, Shiozaki is affiliated to the openly revisionist organization Nippon Kaigi. He also is a member of the following right-wing groups at the Diet:

- Japan Rebirth (創生「日本」 Sōsei Nippon)
- Nippon Kaigi Diet discussion group (日本会議国会議員懇談会 Nippon kaigi kokkai giin kondankai)
- Conference of parliamentarians on the Shinto Association of Spiritual Leadership (神道政治連盟国会議員懇談会) - NB: SAS a.k.a. Sinseiren, Shinto Political League, Shinto Seiji Renmei Kokkai Giin Kondankai

Shiozaki gave the following answers to the questionnaire submitted by Mainichi to parliamentarians in 2012:

- no answer regarding the revision of the Constitution
- in favor of the right of collective self-defense (revision of Article 9)
- no answer regarding the reform of the National assembly (unicameral instead of bicameral)
- in favor of reactivating nuclear power plants
- against the goal of zero nuclear power by 2030s
- in favor of the relocation of Marine Corps Air Station Futenma (Okinawa)
- in favor of evaluating the purchase of Senkaku Islands by the Government
- in favor of a strong attitude versus China
- no answer regarding the participation of Japan to the Trans-Pacific Partnership
- no answer regarding a nuclear-armed Japan
- no answer regarding the reform of the Imperial Household that would allow women to retain their Imperial status even after marriage

On 17 October 2014, Shiozaki sent an offering (masakaki) to the controversial Yasukuni shrine.

== Honours ==
In July 2022, he was awarded as Honorary Member of the Order of the British Empire (MBE), for services to UK/Japan relations.

Political offices
Preceded by Shinzō Abe	Chief Cabinet Secretary; 2006–2007	Succeeded by Kaoru Yosano
Preceded by Norihisa Tamura	Minister of Health, Labour, and Welfare; 2014–2017	Succeeded by Katsunobu Katō
