= Junzo Yamamoto =

Japanese politician (born 1954)

- 山本 順三
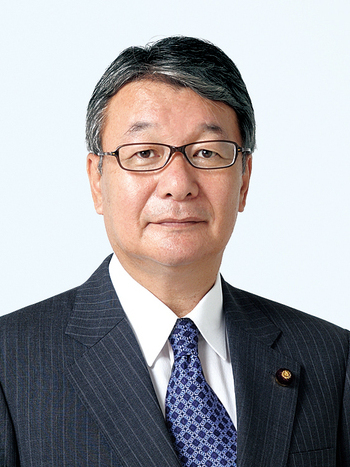
- Official portrait, 2018

Chairman of the National Public Safety Commission
- In office 2 October 2018 – 11 September 2019
- Prime Minister: Shinzo Abe
- Preceded by: Hachiro Okonogi
- Succeeded by: Ryota Takeda

Member of the House of Councillors
- Incumbent
- Assumed office 26 July 2004
- Preceded by: Takeshi Noma
- Constituency: Ehime at-large

Member of the Ehime Prefectural Assembly
- In office 1983–2004
- Constituency: Imabari City

Personal details
- Born: 27 October 1954 (age 72) Imabari, Ehime, Japan
- Party: Liberal Democratic
- Education: Waseda University
- Website: www.j-yamamoto.net

Junzo Yamamoto (Japanese: 山本 順三, Hepburn: Yamamoto Junzō; born October 27, 1954) is a Japanese politician of the Liberal Democratic Party, a member of the House of Councillors in the Diet (national legislature). A graduate of Waseda University, he was elected to the House of Councillors for the first time in 2004 after serving in the assembly of Ehime Prefecture for six terms since 1983.

In October 2015 Yamamoto was appointed state minister of land, infrastructure, transport and tourism, state minister of the Cabinet Office of Japan and state minister for reconstruction, he was active in these posts until August 2016.
