= Gifu Daiichi High School =

Private high school in Japan

Coordinates: 35.4433°N 136.6749°E

- Japanese: 岐阜第一高等学校
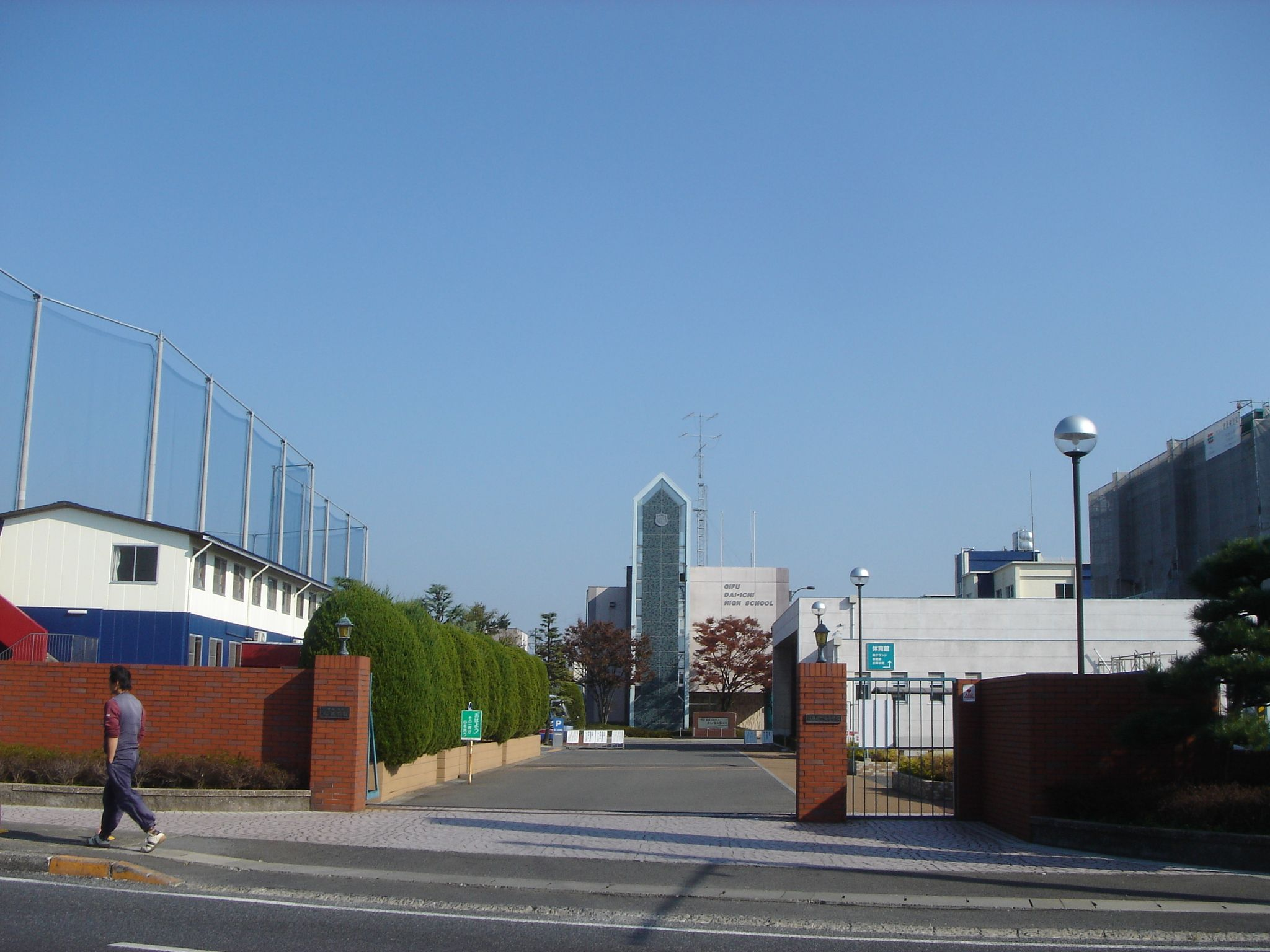

Information
- Established: 1958; 68 years ago
- Gender: Boys (1958-2016); Mixed (2016-Present)
- Affiliation: Shohsui Gakuen Group (Japanese: 学校法人松翠学園)
- Website: www.gifu-daiichi.ed.jp/english/index.html

Gifu Daiichi High School (岐阜第一高等学校, Gifu Daiichi Kōtōgakkō; "Gifu No. 1 High School") is a private high school in Motosu, Gifu Prefecture, Japan. It is a part of the Shohsui Gakuen Group (学校法人松翠学園).

== History ==
The school was established in 1958 and was Gifu Prefecture's sole boys' school until 2016, when it became co-educational.

== See also ==
Other institutions operated by Shohsui Gakuen Group:

- Shiga Bunkyo Junior College
