= Akihisa Shiozaki =

Japanese politician

- 塩崎 彰久
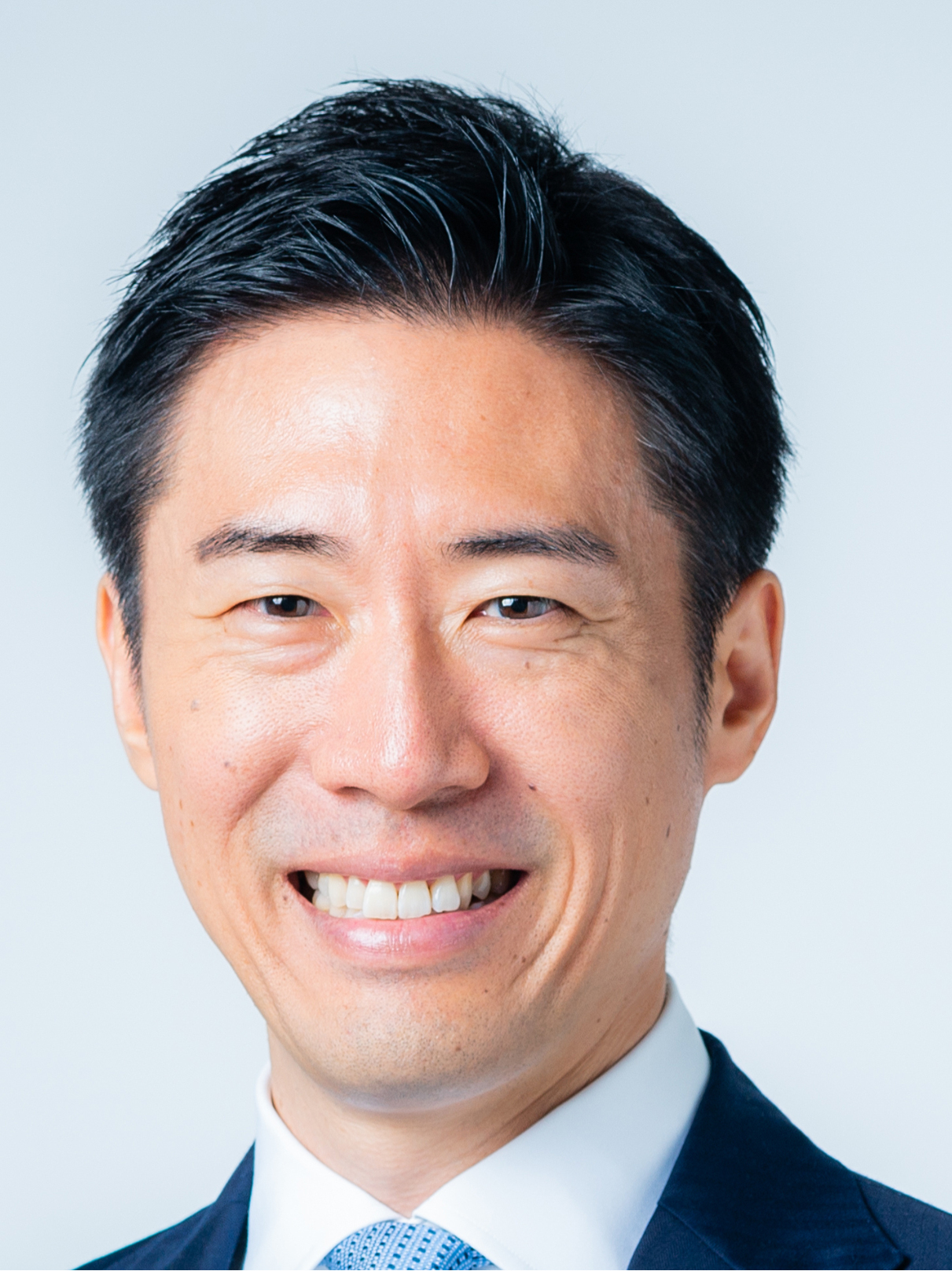
- Official portrait, 2023

Member of the House of Representatives
- Incumbent
- Assumed office 2 November 2021
- Preceded by: Yasuhisa Shiozaki
- Constituency: Ehime 1st

Personal details
- Born: 2 September 1976 (age 50) Matsuyama, Ehime, Japan
- Party: Liberal Democratic
- Parent: Yasuhisa Shiozaki (father)
- Education: University of Tokyo
- Occupation: Lawyer
- Website: https://akihisa-shiozaki.jp

Akihisa Shiozaki is a Japanese politician who is a member of the House of Representatives of Japan.

== Biography ==
He graduated from the School of Law of the University of Tokyo. His father is Yasuhisa Shiozaki, who was a member of the House of Representatives and worked as a Secretary to the Cabinet Secretary in the Prime Minister's Office. In 2021, he ran for the same office after his father retired.
