= Hekisuikai =

Political Party in Japan

Hekisuikai: Hekisuikai; 碧水会
- Leader: Yukiko Kada
- Founded: July 30, 2019
- Dissolved: August 31, 2022

The Hekisuikai (碧水会, "blue/azure/green water association"; self-designation for English-speakers yet to be determined as of July 31, 2019) was a parliamentary group in the House of Councillors, the upper house of the Japanese National Diet. It was formed in late July 2019 briefly after the 25th regular election of members of the House of Councillors by two new members who had been elected as independents for the center-left opposition alliance in single-member constituencies (CDP, DPFP, JCP, Social Security Review Conference and Social Democratic Party):

- Yukiko Kada from Shiga, former governor, who narrowly (49%/47%) defeated LDP incumbent Takeshi Ninoyu,
- and Takako Nagae from Ehime, a former member of the House of Representatives from the Shikoku proportional constituency, who defeated LDP newcomer celebrity-turned-politician Rakusaburō by a solid margin (56%/42%) to succeed retiring Takumi Ihara (LDP).

The Heki (碧; a colour word that can mean either green or blue in the conceptualizations of European languages) in the group name is supposed to represent the colours of the two campaigns, and the "water" (水) refers to the waters of Lake Biwa that is literally and symbolically central to Shiga, and the Seto Inland Sea that surrounds Ehime.
