= Biwako Floating School =

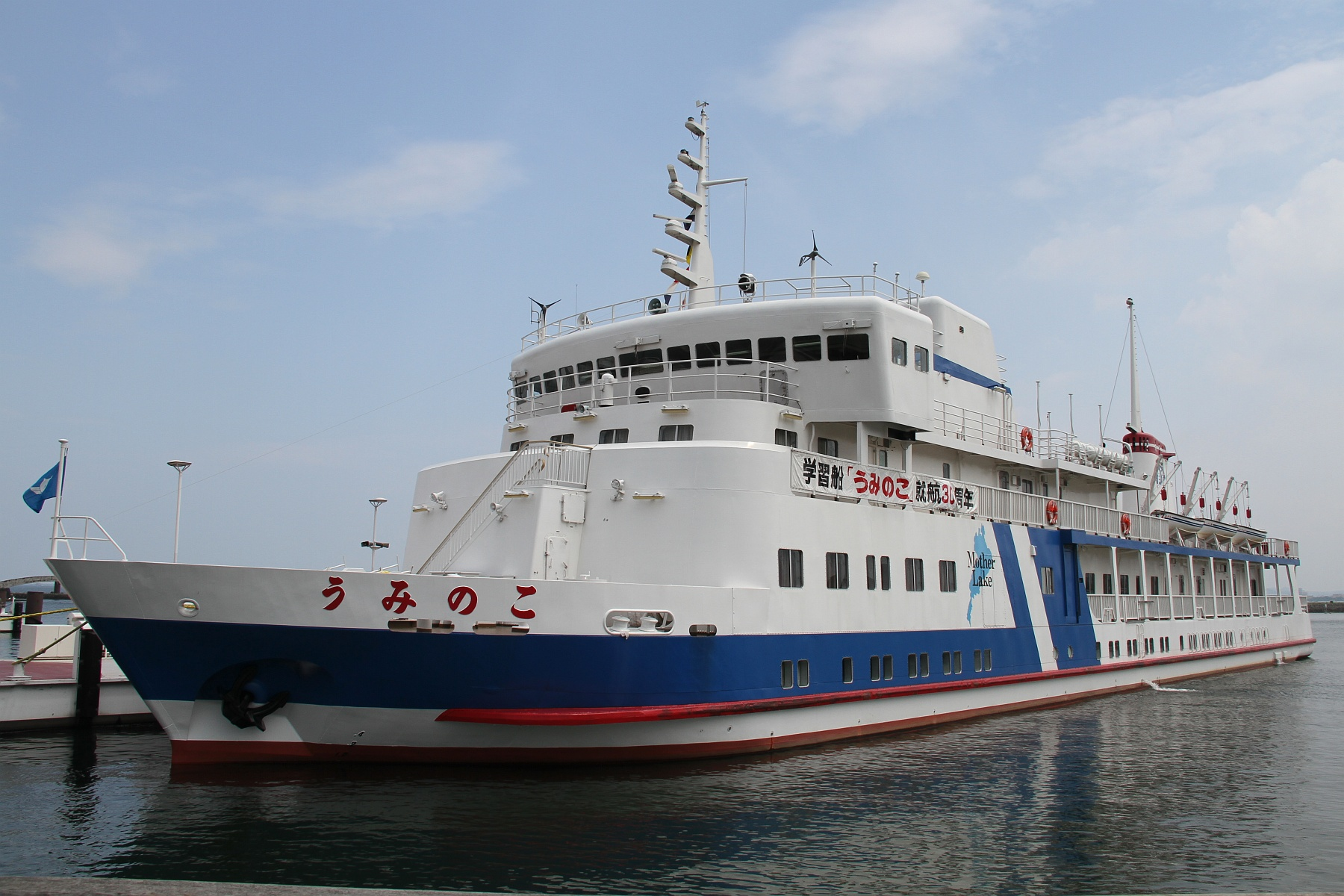
Uminoko, the ship for educational purpose used in Biwako Floating School project. (Uminoko I is in the picture.)

Biwako Floating School (びわ湖フローティングスクール) is an educational project run by Shiga Prefecture, Japan, since 1983. The project involves running an educational cruise program in which fifth graders living in Shiga Prefecture board a ship for educational purpose Uminoko for a two-day, one-night cruise on Biwako, or Lake Biwa. Uminoko carries approximately 160 children per voyage, making 90 voyages per year and carrying 15,000 people each year. Biwako Floating School also refers to this ship.

The purpose of Biwako Floating School project is to help children deepen their understanding of the environment of Lake Biwa and their local area, and to have the children live together on the ship. Participating pupils said they were satisfied with completing the tasks assigned to them, collaborating with their friends, and learning. Teachers who boarded with pupils commented that the project was an inspiring experience for the children.

== Background ==
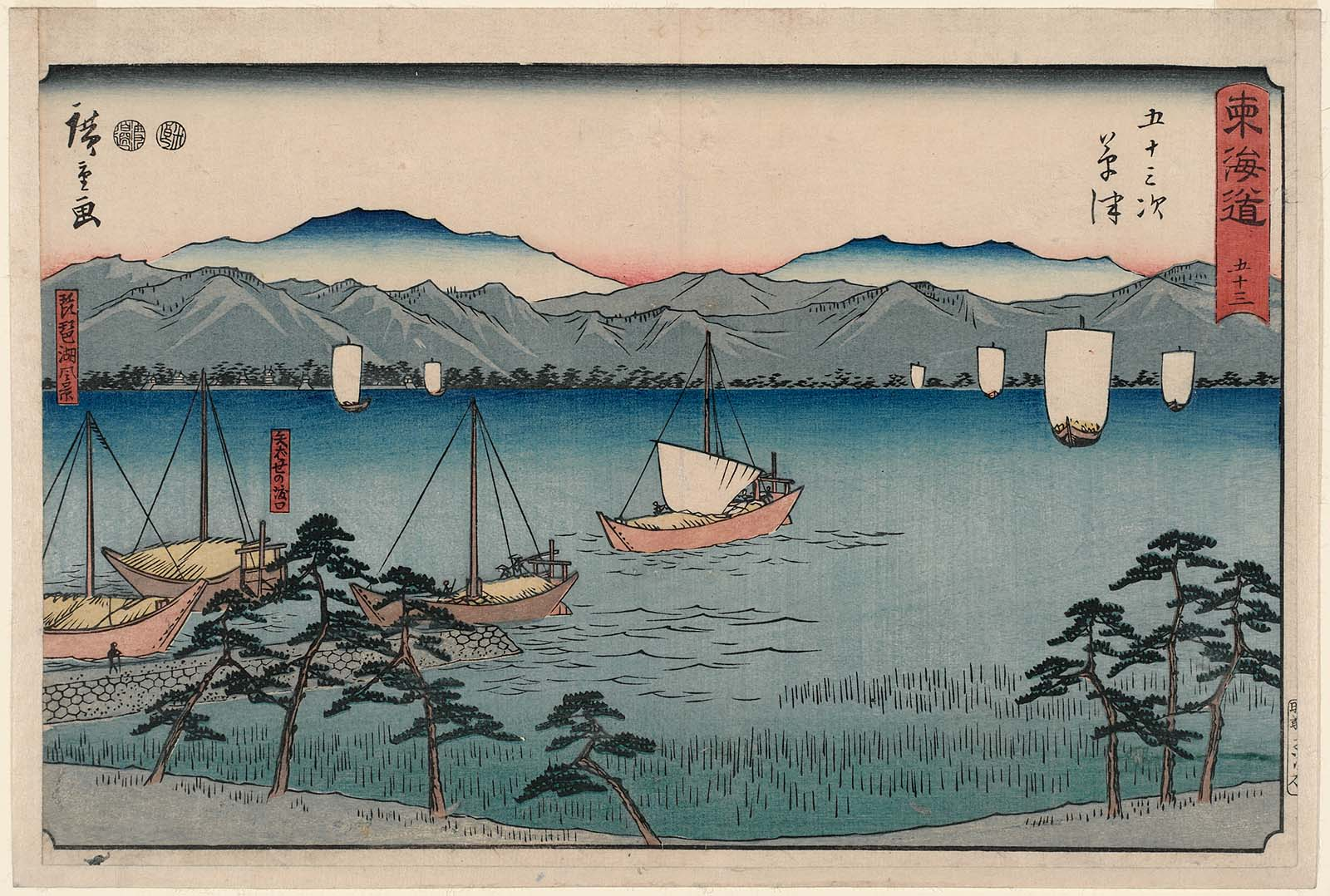
Lake Biwa, depicted by Hiroshige

Even before Biwako Floating School project began, Shiga Prefecture had been conducting educational activities using ships or boats on Lake Biwa. Shiga prefecture has been carrying out "Shiga Youth Ship" project every year since 1969 and "Biwako Boy-and-Girl's Ship" project every year since 1980.

In the high economic growth period (from 1960s to early 1970s), environmental pollution of Lake Biwa became a major social issue in Shiga Prefecture. As measures to combat environmental pollution become an urgent issue across Japan, in 1980, Shiga Prefecture has become the first in the country to enact a new ordinance — Ordinance on the Prevention of Eutrophication of Biwako. This ordinance was enacted as a result of a citizens' movement let by housewives in response to growing environmental awareness, known as "soap movement" (せっけん運動, Sekken Undō).

Biwako Floating School was planned in response to social trends such as the aforementioned citizen movements and growing environmental awareness. In 1982, the prefectural assembly passed a resolution to promote the project. A ship for training and educational purpose was laid down by Hitachi Zōsen Corporation on February 8, 1983, and launched July 5, 1983. A trial voyage was conducted in August 1983. Cruises for educational purpose began every year from 1984.

== Activities ==
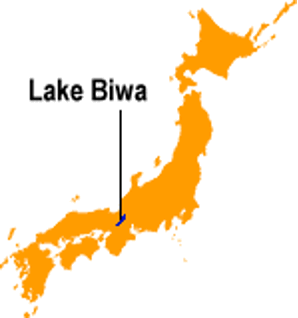
Location of Lake Biwa in Japan

The participants who will be getting to experience boarding Uminoko are fifth grade elementary school students in Shiga Prefecture. During the two-day, one-night cruise, they live together and eat meals together in the dining hall.

Although the main purpose of former Shiga Youth Ship nor Biwako Boy-and-Girl's Ship was to train leaders for those working on the sea or lake, Biwako Floating School aims to increase knowledge and interest in the environment and ecosystems among younger children rather than the former projects' purpose. Fifth graders on board can constantly monitor fish finders and have access to data such as track and depth from navigation equipment. The ship also has a laboratory where scientific studies can be carried out. Learning before and after the cruise is also considered important.

Uminoko carries approximately 160 children per voyage, making 90 voyages per year and carrying 15,000 people each year. The total number of the students who boarded Biwako Floating School reached 600,000 in 2022. In 2023, the project celebrated its 40th anniversary.

== Ships ==
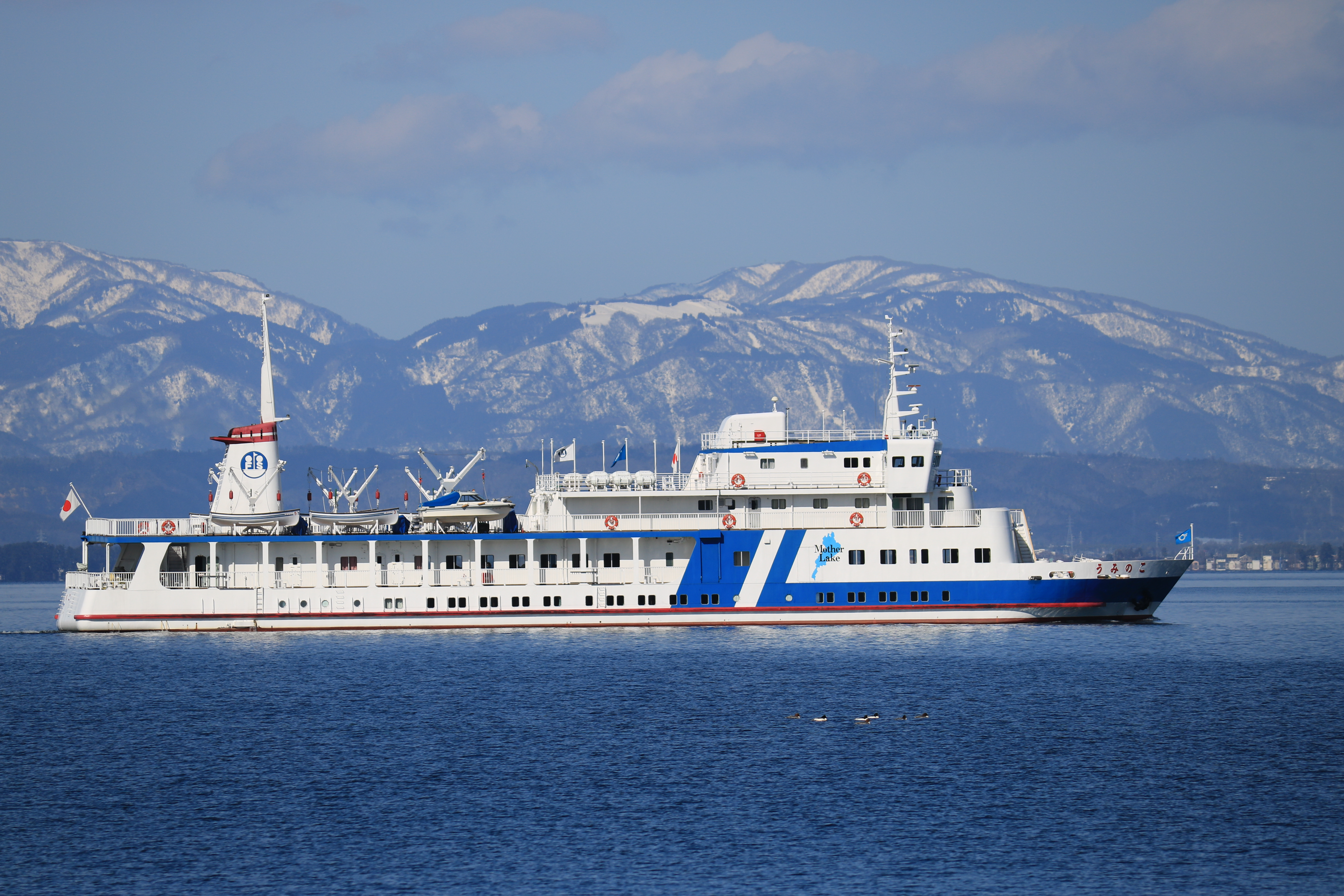
Uminoko I, for three decades in service, before retired.

The ships used for Biwako Floating School project havs been called Uminoko (うみのこ) in their nickname, literally meaning "the child of lake." Uminokos are ships specially designed to teach children about environmental issues.

=== Uminoko I ===
Uminoko I's total tonnage is 928 tons, total length is 65 meters. The total number of people that can be accommodated on board is 417, including crew and passengers. It uses diesel engines as propulsion power.

=== Uminoko II ===
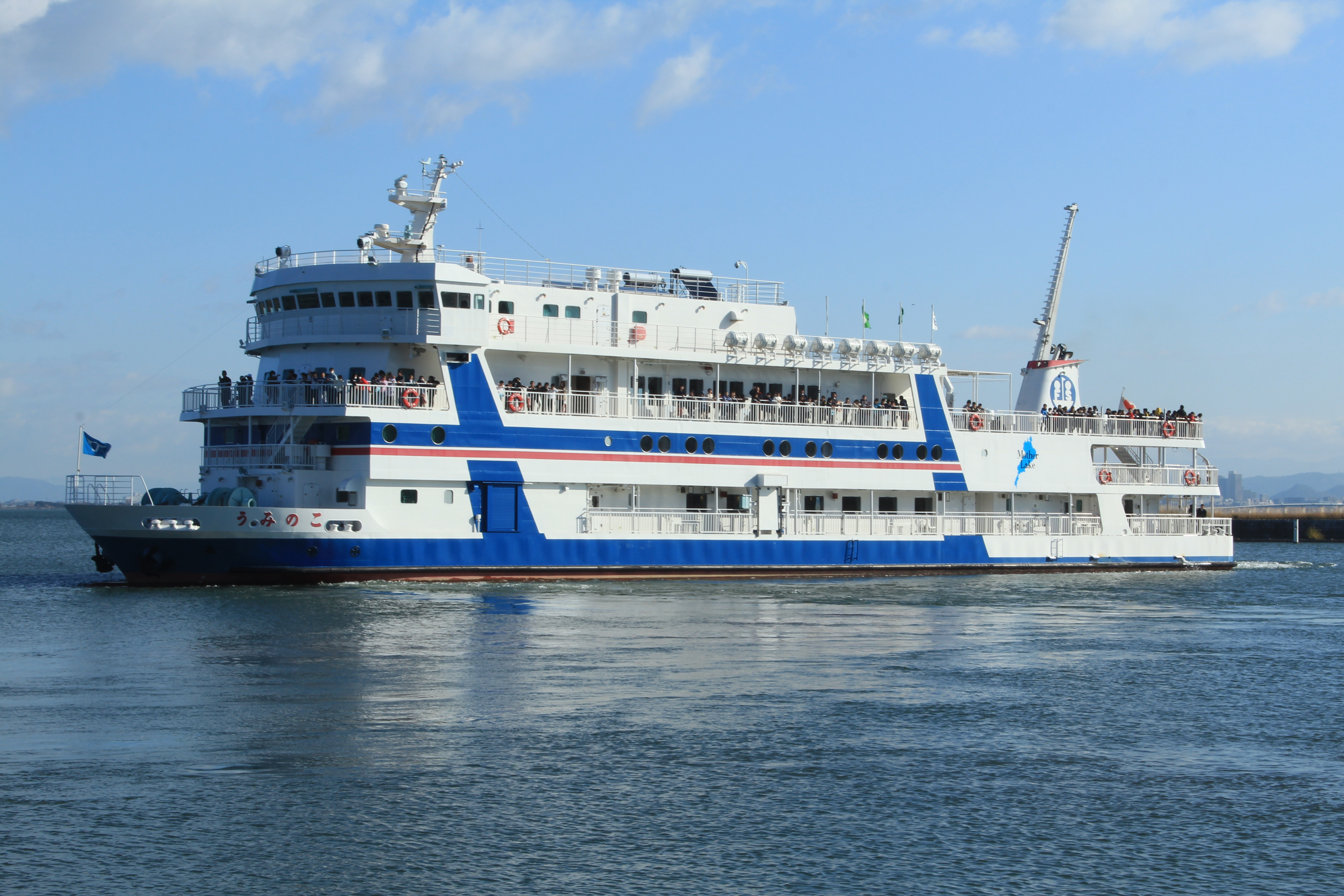
Uminoko II

Uminoko II was laid down and launched 30 years after Uminoko I went into service and after the total number of students who had boarded Uminoko I had reached 500,000. Its total tonnge is 1,355 tons, total length is 64.91 meters. The planned full load draft became 1.5m, 50 cm lower than the previous ship, which has increased the ship's stability. The maximum passenger capacity is 330 people. Uminoko II uses electric propulsion, which makes it quieter.

== Evaluation ==
According to the management office of Biwako Floating School, teachers at the schools where the pupils on board attended commented that the project was an inspiring experience for the children and participating pupils said they were satisfied with completing the tasks assigned to them, collaborating with their friends, and learning. The prefectural assembly frequently mentions Biwako Floating School as an example of a successful project.

Biwako Floating School actively accepts university student volunteers. Based on the legitimate peripheral participation (LPP) theory, it can be said that university students aspiring to become teachers have the opportunity to acquire the skills necessary to carry out the duties of a teacher by volunteering in Biwako Floating School.

The city of Managua, the capital of Nicaragua, had been struggling for many years with the pollution problem of Lake Managua, when JICA, Japan International Cooperation Agency, proposed using Biwako Floating School as a model to provide environmental education to young generation, and Managua showed interest in this idea. In 2020s, the city of Managua commenced its version of Uminoko project with the support of JICA and Shiga Prefecture. The effectiveness of environmental education for young people, which began from Shiga Prefecture, Japan, and Biwako Floating School, is tending to be positively evaluated internationally.
