= Ehime at-large district =

Japan House of Councillors constituency

Ehime At-Large District
- 愛媛県選挙区
- Parliamentary constituency for the House of Councillors
- Prefecture: Ehime
- Electorate: 1,134,208 (as of 1 September 2022)

Current constituency
- Created: 1947
- Seats: 2
- Councillors: Class of 2019: Takako Nagae (Ind.); Class of 2022: Junzo Yamamoto (LDP)

Ehime at-large district (愛媛県選挙区, Ehime-ken senkyoku) is a constituency of the House of Councillors in the Diet of Japan (national legislature). It represents Ehime Prefecture and elects two Councillors, one every three years by a first-past-the-post system for a six-year term. In the first election in 1947, Ehime like all districts used single non-transferable vote to elect both its Councillors in one election. It has 1,169,427 registered voters as of September 2015. As a predominantly rural district, it has favoured the Liberal Democratic Party (LDP) candidate in most elections.

The current Councillors for Ehime are:

- Junzo Yamamoto (LDP, third term, expires 2022)
- Takako Nagae (Independent, first term, expires 2025)

== Current Councillors ==
As of 31 January 2023, the current Councillors for Ehime are:

- Junzo Yamamoto (LDP, third term, expires 2022)
- Takako Nagae (Independent, first term, expires 2025)

== Elected Councillors ==
Class of 1947 (1947: #1, 6-year term)	election year	Class of 1950 (1947: #2, 3-year term)
Sadatake Hisamatsu (Ehime Democratic Party) (Note: Resigned 31 March 1951.)	1947	Tsunetaro Nakahira (Social Democratic)
Sadatake Hisamatsu (Ehime Democratic Party)	1950	Hachijiro Mitsuhashi (Social Democratic)
Minoru Tamayanagi (Ind.)	1951 by-el. (Note: Held 21 May 1951.)	Hachijiro Mitsuhashi (Social Democratic)
Isamu Yuyama (Japan Teachers' Political Federation)	1953	Hachijiro Mitsuhashi (Social Democratic)
Isamu Yuyama (Japan Teachers' Political Federation)	1956	Senjitsu Horimoto (LDP)
Keikichi Masuhara (LDP)	1959	Senjitsu Horimoto (LDP)
Keikichi Masuhara (LDP)	1962	Senjitsu Horimoto (LDP)
Keikichi Masuhara (LDP)	1965	Senjitsu Horimoto (LDP)
Keikichi Masuhara (LDP)	1968	Senjitsu Horimoto (LDP)
Keikichi Masuhara (LDP)	1971	Senjitsu Horimoto (LDP)
Keikichi Masuhara (LDP)	1974	Masami Aoi (LDP)
Tokutaro Higaki (LDP)	1977	Masami Aoi (LDP)
Tokutaro Higaki (LDP)	1980	Yukio Nakagawa (LDP)
Tokutaro Higaki (LDP)	1983	Yukio Nakagawa (LDP)
Tokutaro Higaki (LDP)	1986	Yukio Nakagawa (LDP)
Oasmu Ikeda (Rengō no Kai)	1989	Yukio Nakagawa (LDP)
Oasmu Ikeda (Rengō no Kai)	1992	Takeshi Noma (LDP)
Yasuhisa Shiozaki (LDP) (Note: Resigned 12 May 2000.)	1995	Takeshi Noma (LDP)
Yasuhisa Shiozaki (LDP)	1998	Takeshi Noma (LDP)
Katsutsugu Sekiya (LDP)	2000 by-el. (Note: Held 25 June 2000.)	Takeshi Noma (LDP)
Katsutsugu Sekiya (LDP)	2001	Takeshi Noma (LDP)
Katsutsugu Sekiya (LDP)	2004	Junzo Yamamoto (LDP)
Toshirō Tomochika (Ind.)	2007	Junzo Yamamoto (LDP)
Toshirō Tomochika (Ind.)	2010	Junzo Yamamoto (LDP)
Takumi Ihara (LDP)	2013	Junzo Yamamoto (LDP)
Takumi Ihara (LDP)	2016	Junzo Yamamoto (LDP)
Takako Nagae (Ind.)	2019	Junzo Yamamoto (LDP)
Takako Nagae (Ind.)	2022	Junzo Yamamoto (LDP)

== Election results ==
=== Elections in the 2020s ===
2022
Party	Candidate	Votes	%	±%
LDP	Junzo Yamamoto (Incumbent) (Endorsed by Komeito)	318,846	59.04%	▲9.46
Independent	Chika Takami (Endorsed by CDP)	173,229	32.08%	New
Sanseito	Kuniyasu Yagi	27,912	5.17%	New
Anti-NHK	Hirokuni Yoshihara	12,714	2.35%	New
JCP	Takashi Matsuki	7,350	1.36%	New
Turnout		540,051	48.81%	▼3.58

=== Elections in the 2010s ===
2019
Party	Candidate	Votes	%	±%
Independent	Takako Nagae (Endorsed by the CDP, DPP, JCP, and SDP)	335,425	56.00%	New
LDP	Rakusaburo (Endorsed by Komeito)	248,616	41.51%	▼25.09
Anti-NHK	Kaoru Mukumoto	14,943	2.49%	New
Turnout		598,984	52.39%	▼3.97
