= Takashi Koyari =

Japanese politician

- 小鑓 隆史
- Official portrait, 2026

Member of the House of Councillors
- Incumbent
- Assumed office 26 July 2016
- Preceded by: Kumiko Hayashi
- Constituency: Shiga at-large

Personal details
- Born: 9 September 1966 (age 60) Ōtsu, Shiga, Japan
- Party: Liberal Democratic
- Education: Kyoto University; University of London

Takashi Koyari is a Japanese politician who is a member of the House of Councillors of Japan.

== Biography ==
He was elected in 2016 and in 2022.
