= Shiga Bunkyo Junior College =

Private junior college in Japan

- 滋賀文教短期大学
- Type: private junior college
- Established: 1952
- Parent institution: Shohsui Gakuen Group (学校法人松翠学園)
- Location: Nagahama, Shiga, Japan; 35°21′30.9″N 136°17′14.5″E

Shiga Bunkyo Junior College (滋賀文教短期大学, Shiga bunkyō tanki daigaku) is a private junior college in Nagahama, Shiga, Japan, established in 1952.

It is a part of the Shohsui Gakuen Group (学校法人松翠学園) and is Gifu Prefecture's only boys' school.

Shohsui Gakuen Group also operates Gifu Daiichi High School.
