= Takaya Mutō =

Japanese politician

- 武藤 貴也

Member of the House of Representatives
- In office 16 December 2012 – 28 September 2017
- Preceded by: Tenzo Okumura
- Succeeded by: Hiroo Kotera
- Constituency: Shiga 4th

Personal details
- Born: 25 May 1979 (age 47) Shiranuka, Hokkaido, Japan
- Party: Independent
- Other political affiliations: Liberal Democratic (until 2015)
- Education: Tokyo University of Foreign Studies

Takaya Mutō is a Japanese politician and a former member of the National Diet where he sat in the House of Representatives. Previously a member of the Liberal Democratic Party, he resigned his party membership in 2015.
