= Takako Nagae =

Japanese politician

- 永江 孝子
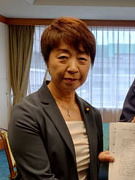
- Nagae in 2024

Member of the House of Councillors
- Incumbent
- Assumed office 29 July 2019
- Preceded by: Takumi Ihara
- Constituency: Ehime at-large

Member of the House of Representatives
- In office 31 August 2009 – 16 November 2012
- Constituency: Shikoku PR

Personal details
- Born: 15 June 1960 (age 66) Matsuyama, Ehime, Japan
- Party: Independent (2016–2019; 2022–present)
- Other political affiliations: Democratic (2009–2016); Hekisuikai (2019–2022)
- Education: Kobe University

Takako Nagae is a Japanese politician who is a member of the House of Councillors of Japan.

== Career ==
Nagae worked for NHK. In 2009, was elected for the House of Representatives for one term. In 2019, she was elected in the House of Councillors.
