= Hiroo Kotera =

Japanese politician

- 小寺 裕雄
- Official portrait, 2026

Member of the House of Representatives
- Incumbent
- Assumed office 22 October 2017
- Preceded by: Takaya Mutō
- Constituency: Shiga 4th (2017–2024); Kinki PR (2024–present)

Member of the Shiga Prefectural Assembly
- In office 30 April 2011 – 2017
- In office 30 April 2003 – 29 April 2007

Personal details
- Born: 18 September 1960 (age 66) Yōkaichi, Shiga, Japan
- Party: Liberal Democratic
- Education: Doshisha University

Hiroo Kotera is a Japanese politician who is a member of the House of Representatives of Japan.

== Biography ==
He had attended Doshisha University.
