= 2026 Japanese general election in Shikoku =

- February 8, 2026

All 16 seats to the House of Representatives
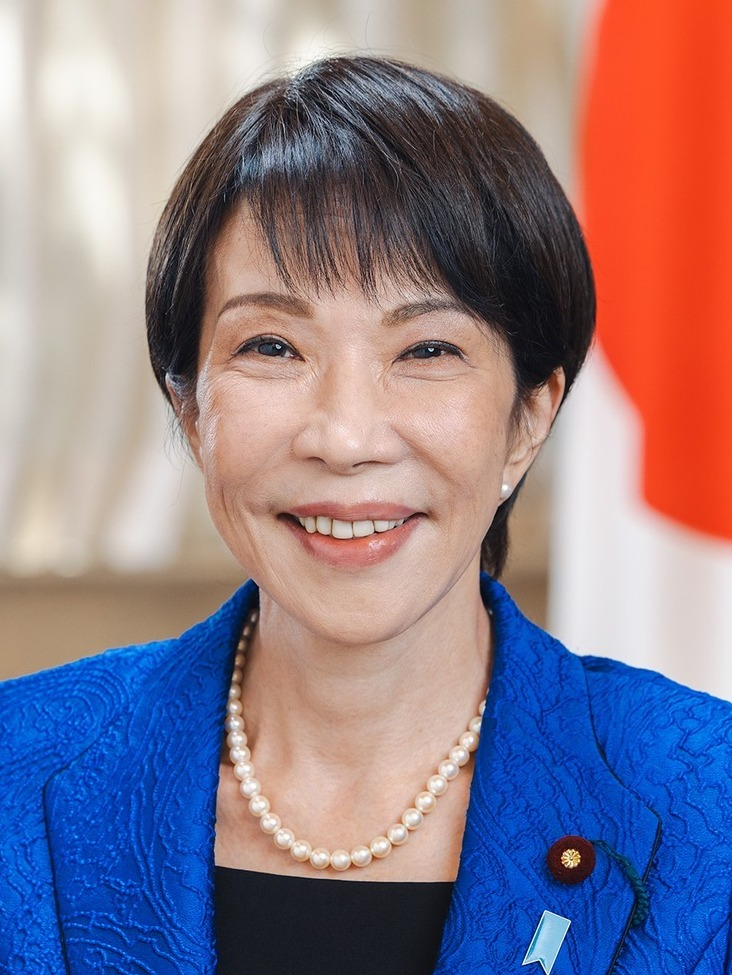

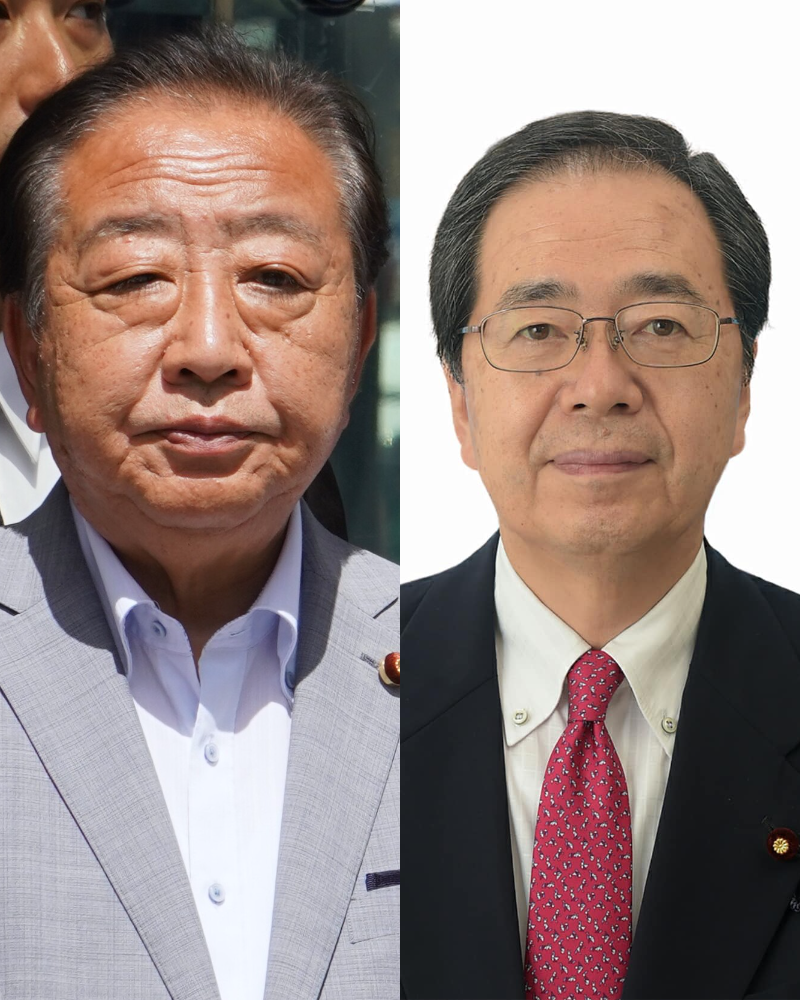

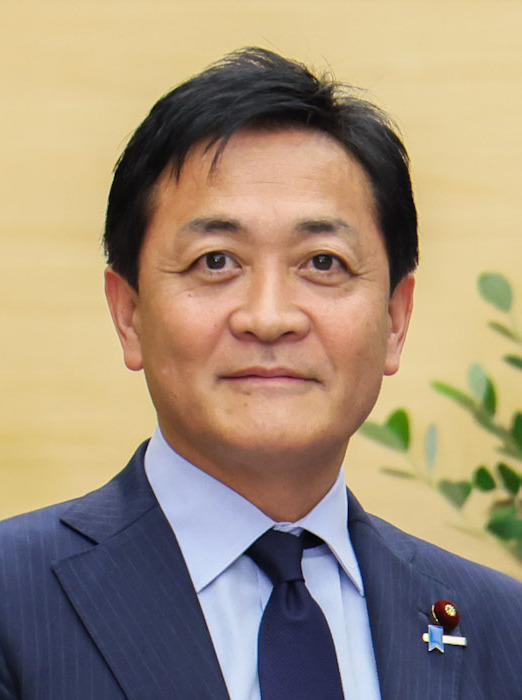
| | Majority party | Minority party | Third party |
|---|---|---|---|
| Party | LDP | Centrist Reform | DPP |
| Last election | 10 seats | 4 seats (Note: As CDP and Komeito) | 2 seats |
| Constituency | 8 | 1 | 1 |
| Constituency vote | 905,808; 55.22% | 283,004; 17.25% | 222,611; 13.57% |
| PR seats | 4 | 1 | 1 |
| Regional vote | 691,402; 42.04% | 299,777; 18.23% | 213,661; 12.99% |
| Total | 12 | 2 | 2 |
| Seat change | ▲2 | ▼2 | Steady |

This page contains the detailed results for the 2026 Japanese general election in Shikoku.

Within Shikoku region, there is the Shikoku proportional block which elects 6 members by party list proportional representation. In addition to the block seats, Shikoku has 10 constituencies each electing a single member each by first past the post.

== Total results ==
Of the 10 constituencies, LDP won eight seats in a landslide, and increased seats won by one in the PR block.

In two constituencies that CRA (then CDP) won in the last election, LDP and CRA competed closely. While Junya Ogawa (Kagawa 1st district Incumbent) hold his seat, Yoichi Shiraishi (Ehime 2nd district Incumbent) was deprived of his seat by LDP.

| Party | Proportional | | | Constituency | | | Total seats | +/– |
| Party | Votes | % | Seats | Votes | % | Seats | Total seats | +/– |
|---|---|---|---|---|---|---|---|---|
| LDP | 691,402 | 42.04 | 4 | 905,808 | 55.22 | 8 | 12 | ▲2 |
| CRA | 299,777 | 18.23 | 1 | 283,004 | 17.25 | 1 | 2 | ▼2 |
| DPP | 213,661 | 12.99 | 1 | 222,611 | 13.57 | 1 | 2 | – |
| Sanseitō | 138,187 | 8.40 | 0 | 114,965 | 7.01 | 0 | 0 | – |
| Ishin | 121,217 | 7.37 | 0 | 29,480 | 1.80 | 0 | 0 | – |
| JCP | 68,324 | 4.15 | 0 | 58,932 | 3.59 | 0 | 0 | – |
| Reiwa | 49,267 | 3.00 | 0 | | | | 0 | – |
| CPJ | 44,284 | 2.69 | 0 | | | | 0 | – |
| SDP | 18,674 | 1.14 | 0 | | | | 0 | – |
| Independent | | | | 25,705 | 1.57 | 0 | – | – |
| Total | 1,644,793 | 100.00 | 6 | 1,640,505 | 100.00 | 10 | 16 | – |
| Valid votes | 1,644,793 | 97.72 | | 1,640,505 | 97.46 | | | |
| Invalid/blank votes | 38,292 | 2.28 | | 42,720 | 2.54 | | | |
| Total votes | 1,683,085 | 100.00 | | 1,683,225 | 100.00 | | | |
| Registered voters/turnout | 3,028,194 | 55.58 | | 3,028,194 | 55.59 | | | |
Source: Ministry of Internal Affairs and Communications

== Results by constituency ==
Single-member constituency results in Shikoku
| Constituency | Incumbent | Party | Status | Elected Member | Party |
Tokushima
| Tokushima 1st | Hirobumi Niki | LDP | Reelected. | Hirobumi Niki | LDP |
| Tokushima 2nd | Shunichi Yamaguchi | LDP | Reelected. | Shunichi Yamaguchi | LDP |
Kagawa
| Kagawa 1st | Junya Ogawa | CRA | Reelected. | Junya Ogawa | CRA |
| Kagawa 2nd | Yuichiro Tamaki | DPP | Reelected. | Yuichiro Tamaki | DPP |
| Kagawa 3rd | Keitaro Ohno | LDP | Reelected. | Keitaro Ohno | LDP |
Ehime
| Ehime 1st | Akihisa Shiozaki | LDP | Reelected. | Akihisa Shiozaki | LDP |
| Ehime 2nd | Yoichi Shiraishi | CRA | Defeated. | Takumi Ihara | LDP |
| Ehime 3rd | Junji Hasegawa | LDP | Reelected. | Junji Hasegawa | LDP |
Kōchi
| Kōchi 1st | Gen Nakatani | LDP | Reelected. | Gen Nakatani | LDP |
| Kōchi 2nd | Masanao Ozaki | LDP | Reelected. | Masanao Ozaki | LDP |

=== Tokushima 1st ===
Tokushima 1st
| Party | Candidate | Votes | % | ±% |
|---|---|---|---|---|
| LDP | Hirobumi Niki | 107,440 | 58.20 | +8.34 |
| Centrist Reform | Ei Takahashi | 46,960 | 25.44 | −6.58 |
| Ishin | Tomoyo Yoshida | 16,040 | 8.69 | −3.15 |
| Sanseitō | Chiharu Kamei | 14,154 | 7.67 | New |
| Turnout | | | 54.43 | ▲4.37 |
| LDP hold | | | | |

Like the last election, LDP's Hirobumi Niki won a landslide victory.

=== Tokushima 2nd ===
Tokushima 2nd
| Party | Candidate | Votes | % | ±% |
|---|---|---|---|---|
| LDP | Shunichi Yamaguchi | 64,980 | 48.56 | +4.70 |
| DPP | Kamon Iizumi (Won PR seat) | 36,629 | 27.37 | New |
| Independent | Kazuto Kitajima | 25,705 | 19.21 | New |
| JCP | Kyosei Hama | 6,504 | 4.86 | −1.58 |
| Turnout | | | 55.36 | ▲3.5 |
| LDP hold | | | | |

LDP has nominated Incumbent Shunichi Yamaguchi as its candidate. Meanwhile, DPP nominated former Tokushima governor Komon Iizumi, who ran as an independent candidate for Tokushima 2nd in the last election.

Masazumi Gotoda, the current governor of Tokushima who has been at odds with Iizumi, criticized DPP and Iizumi as follows.
"He (Iizumi) lost the gubernatorial election two and a half years ago, lost the last general election. And he announced that he would retire from politics, and while he was serving as governor for five terms, Tokushima's tourists and hometown tax donations were the lowest in the country. Does DPP lick Tokushima prefecture (to nominate him as a candidate)? Moreover, at the press conference, he (Iizumi) said he want to do something about Tokushima's plight. I was dumbfounded and turned upside down. He is licking Tokushima too much."

In addition, Kazuto Kitajima, a member of Tokushima prefectural assembly (LDP), also announced his candidacy. Kitajima left the LDP and resigned as a member of the prefectural assembly.

As a result of the election, Yamaguchi was elected by a large margin over Iizumi, Kitajima and JCP candidates. Defeated Iizumi won the seat in the PR block.

=== Kagawa 1st ===
Kagawa 1st
| Party | Candidate | Votes | % | ±% |
|---|---|---|---|---|
| Centrist Reform | Junya Ogawa | 73,237 | 43.04 | −8.29 |
| LDP | Takuya Hirai (Won PR seat) | 72,408 | 42.56 | +10.40 |
| Sanseitō | Kazuki Michikawa | 19,364 | 11.38 | New |
| JCP | Masaki Nagao | 5,133 | 3.02 | −0.49 |
| Turnout | | | 56.64 | ▲3.43 |
| Centrist Reform hold | | | | |

It was the ninth confrontation between former CDP Secretary General Junya Ogawa (CRA) and former Digital minister Takuya Hirai (LDP). After a close race, Ogawa won and held his seat. Defeated Hirai won the seat in the PR block.

=== Kagawa 2nd ===
Kagawa 2nd
| Party | Candidate | Votes | % | ±% |
|---|---|---|---|---|
| DPP | Yuichiro Tamaki | 82,752 | 59.92 | −6.49 |
| LDP | Takakazu Seto (Won PR seat) | 46,747 | 33.85 | +5.04 |
| Sanseitō | Yuriko Akiyama | 8,605 | 6.23 | New |
| Turnout | | | 57.96 | ▲3.01 |
| DPP hold | | | | |

Tamaki Yuichiro, Leader of the DPP, won a landslide victory to hold his seat. Defeated Seto Takakazu Seto (LDP) won a seat in the PR block.

=== Kagawa 3rd ===
Kagawa 3rd
| Party | Candidate | Votes | % | ±% |
|---|---|---|---|---|
| LDP | Keitaro Ohno | 71,529 | 59.11 | +4.01 |
| DPP | Tomomitsu Kawasaki | 36,043 | 29.78 | New |
| Ishin | Shuhei Hosokawa | 13,440 | 11.11 | −2.90 |
| Turnout | | | 54.99 | ▲4.6 |
| LDP hold | | | | |

Keitaro Ohno (LDP) won a landslide victory to keep his seat.

=== Ehime 1st ===
Ehime 1st
| Party | Candidate | Votes | % | ±% |
|---|---|---|---|---|
| LDP | Akihisa Shiozaki | 127,770 | 60.39 | +6.37 |
| DPP | Tomoe Ishii | 46,245 | 21.86 | −2.92 |
| Sanseitō | Ai Shinotō | 23,828 | 11.26 | New |
| JCP | Tsukasa Wada | 13,718 | 6.48 | +1.56 |
| Turnout | | | 52.43 | ▲4.83 |
| LDP hold | | | | |

Akihisa Shiozaki (LDP) won the seat by a landslide.

=== Ehime 2nd ===
Ehime 2nd
| Party | Candidate | Votes | % | ±% |
|---|---|---|---|---|
| LDP | Takumi Ihara | 100,438 | 47.56 | +7.50 |
| Centrist Reform | Yoichi Shiraishi | 84,853 | 40.18 | −11.04 |
| Sanseitō | Shintaro Harada | 25,895 | 12.26 | New |
| Turnout | | | 56.98 | ▲3.69 |
| LDP gain from Centrist Reform | | | | |

It was the third showdown between Takumi Ihara (LDP) and Yoichi Shiraishi (CRA).

In the last election, Ihara, who was not allowed to run for PR block because Ihara was involved in a slush fund scandal, ran only in a single member district. Shiraishi won by a large margin, partly due to criticism of the slush fund scandal.

At first, former Minister of Internal Affairs and Communications Seiichiro Murakami, who was based in Imabari City, was scheduled to participate in a campaign rally to support Ihara, but was absent from Ihara's campaign rally due to protests that he was ranked 10th on the PR block's political party list.

After a close match, Ihara regained a seat from Shiraishi.

=== Ehime 3rd ===
Ehime 3rd
| Party | Candidate | Votes | % | ±% |
|---|---|---|---|---|
| LDP | Junji Hasegawa | 119,930 | 71.18 | +9.10 |
| Centrist Reform | Akihito Hagiwara | 39,094 | 23.20 | −7.48 |
| JCP | Naohito Nishii | 9,462 | 5.62 | −1.62 |
| Turnout | | | 58.42 | ▲2.14 |
| LDP hold | | | | |

Junji Hasegawa (LDP) won the seat by a landslide.

=== Kōchi 1st ===
Kōchi 1st
| Party | Candidate | Votes | % | ±% |
|---|---|---|---|---|
| LDP | Gen Nakatani | 92,043 | 59.76 | −1.75 |
| Centrist Reform | Yūsuke Tadokoro | 38,860 | 25.23 | −13.26 |
| Sanseitō | Mikihiro Kinjo | 23,119 | 15.01 | New |
| Turnout | | | 53.36 | ▲3.77 |
| LDP hold | | | | |

Former defense minister Gen Nakatani hold the seat by a landslide.

=== Kōchi 2nd ===
Kōchi 2nd
| Party | Candidate | Votes | % | ±% |
|---|---|---|---|---|
| LDP | Masanao Ozaki | 102,523 | 69.47 | −0.79 |
| JCP | Yuriko Hamakawa | 24,115 | 16.34 | −13.40 |
| DPP | Tsuyoshi Maeda | 20,942 | 14.19 | New |
| Turnout | | | 56.68 | ▲2.09 |
| LDP hold | | | | |

Masao Ozaki, Former governor of Kōchi Prefecture and Incumbent Deputy Chief Cabinet Secretary, won a landslide victory.

== Results of proportional representation block ==
Proportional representation seat results
| # | Party | Elected Member | Constituency |
|---|---|---|---|
| 1 | LDP | Takuya Hirai | Kagawa 1st |
| 2 | LDP | Takakazu Seto | Kagawa 2nd |
| 3 | CRA | Masayasu Yamasaki | PR only |
| 4 | LDP | Seiichiro Murakami | PR only |
| 5 | DPP | Kamon Iizumi | Tokushima 2nd |
| 6 | LDP | Norihiro Nakayama | PR only |

| Party | Votes | % | Seats | +/– |
|---|---|---|---|---|
| LDP | 691,402 | 42.04 | 4 | ▲1 |
| CRA | 299,777 | 18.23 | 1 | ▼1 |
| DPP | 213,661 | 12.99 | 1 | – |
| Sanseitō | 138,187 | 8.40 | 0 | – |
| Ishin | 121,217 | 7.37 | 0 | – |
| JCP | 68,324 | 4.15 | 0 | – |
| Reiwa | 49,267 | 3.00 | 0 | – |
| CPJ | 44,284 | 2.69 | 0 | – |
| SDP | 18,674 | 1.14 | 0 | – |
| Total | 1,644,793 | 100.00 | 6 | – |

=== LDP party-list ===
Liberal Democratic Party
| Rank | # | Member | Constituency | Sekihairitsu |
|---|---|---|---|---|
| 1 | — | ~~Hirobumi Niki~~ | Tokushima 1st | Eliminated |
| 1 | — | ~~Keitaro Ohno~~ | Kagawa 3rd | Eliminated |
| 1 | — | ~~Akihisa Shiozaki~~ | Ehime 1st | Eliminated |
| 1 | — | ~~Takumi Ihara~~ | Ehime 2nd | Eliminated |
| 1 | — | ~~Junji Hasegawa~~ | Ehime 3rd | Eliminated |
| 1 | — | ~~Gen Nakatani~~ | Kōchi 1st | Eliminated |
| 1 | — | ~~Masanao Ozaki~~ | Kōchi 2nd | Eliminated |
| 1 | 1 | Takuya Hirai | Kagawa 1st | 98.8% |
| 1 | 2 | Takakazu Seto | Kagawa 2nd | 56.4% |
| 10 | 3 | Seiichiro Murakami | PR only | — |
| 11 | 4 | Norihiro Nakayama | PR only | — |
| 12 | 5 | Masaki Okayama | PR only | — |
| 13 | 6 | Naoki Miyamoto | PR only | — |
| 14 | 7 | Shinji Usami | PR only | — |
| 15 | 8 | Naka Takahashi | PR only | — |

=== CRA party-list ===
Centrist Reform Alliance
| Rank | # | Member | Constituency | Sekihairitsu |
|---|---|---|---|---|
| 1 | 1 | Masayasu Yamasaki | PR only | — |
| 2 | — | ~~Junya Ogawa~~ | Kagawa 1st | Eliminated |
| 2 | 2 | Yoichi Shiraishi | Ehime 2nd | 84.4% |
| 2 | 3 | Ei Takahashi | Tokushima 1st | 43.7% |
| 2 | 4 | Yūsuke Tadokoro | Kōchi 1st | 42.2% |
| 2 | 5 | Akihito Hagiwara | Ehime 3rd | 32.5% |

=== DPP party-list ===
Democratic Party For the People
| Rank | # | Member | Constituency | Sekihairitsu |
|---|---|---|---|---|
| 1 | 1 | Kamon Iizumi | Tokushima 2nd | 56.3% |
| 1 | 2 | Tomomitsu Kawasaki | Kagawa 3rd | 50.3% |
| 1 | 3 | Tomoe Ishii | Ehime 1st | 36.1% |
| 1 | 4 | Tsuyoshi Maeda | Kōchi 2nd | 20.4% |

=== Sanseitō party-list ===
Sanseitō
| Rank | # | Member | Constituency | Sekihairitsu |
|---|---|---|---|---|
| 1 | 1 | Shintaro Harada | Ehime 2nd | 25.7% |
| 2 | 2 | Mikihiro Kinjo | Kōchi 1st | 25.1% |

=== Ishin party-list ===
Japan Innovation Party
| Rank | # | Member | Constituency | Sekihairitsu |
|---|---|---|---|---|
| 1 | — | ~~Tomoyo Yoshida~~ | Tokushima 1st | Eliminated (Note: Because of fewer votes less than 10%) |
| 1 | 1 | Shuhei Hosokawa | Kagawa 3rd | — |

=== JCP party-list ===
Japanese Communist Party
| Rank | # | Member | Constituency | Sekihairitsu |
|---|---|---|---|---|
| 1 | 1 | Kōsaku Nakane | PR only | — |

=== Reiwa party-list ===
Reiwa Shinsengumi
| Rank | # | Member | Constituency | Sekihairitsu |
|---|---|---|---|---|
| 1 | 1 | Michiko Senba | PR only | — |

=== CPJ party-list ===
Conservative Party of Japan
| Rank | # | Member | Constituency | Sekihairitsu |
|---|---|---|---|---|
| 1 | 1 | Shōko Mitani | PR only | — |

=== SDP party-list ===
Social Democratic Party
| Rank | # | Member | Constituency | Sekihairitsu |
|---|---|---|---|---|
| 1 | 1 | Kōjiro Kibō | PR only | — |
