= 2021 Japanese general election in Shikoku =

- October 31, 2021

All 17 seats to the House of Representatives
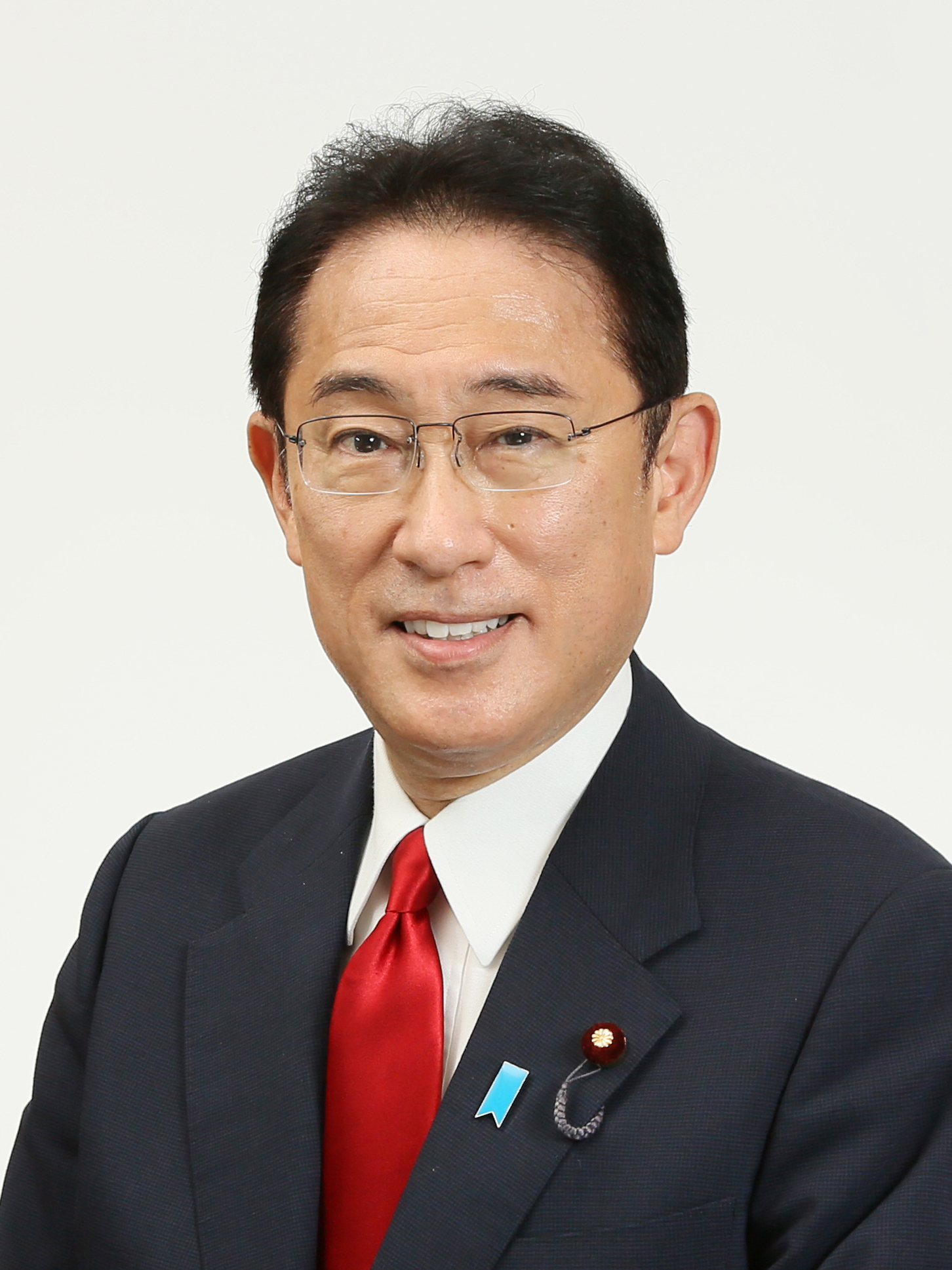

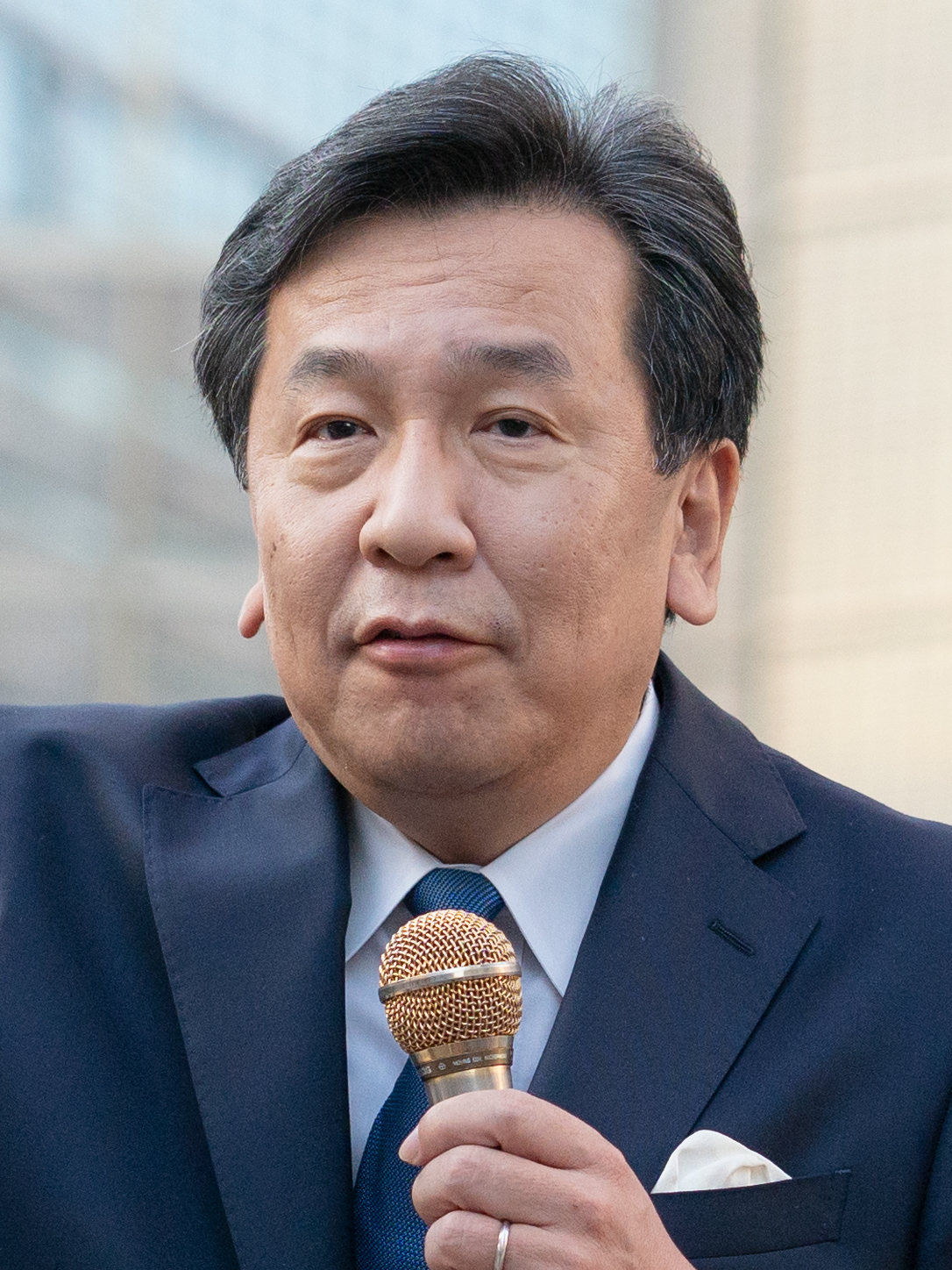

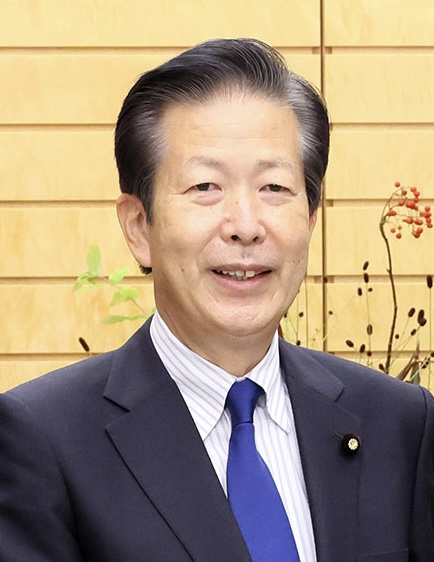

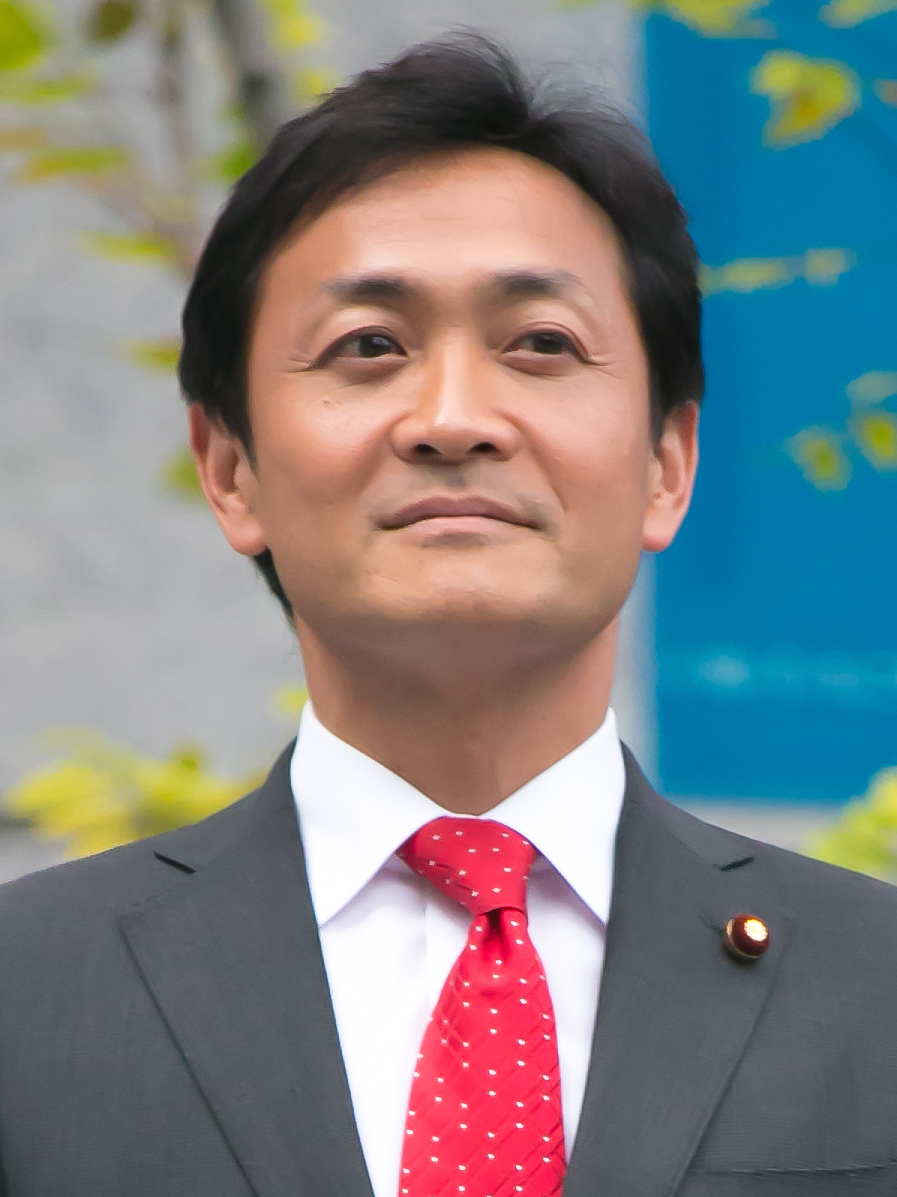

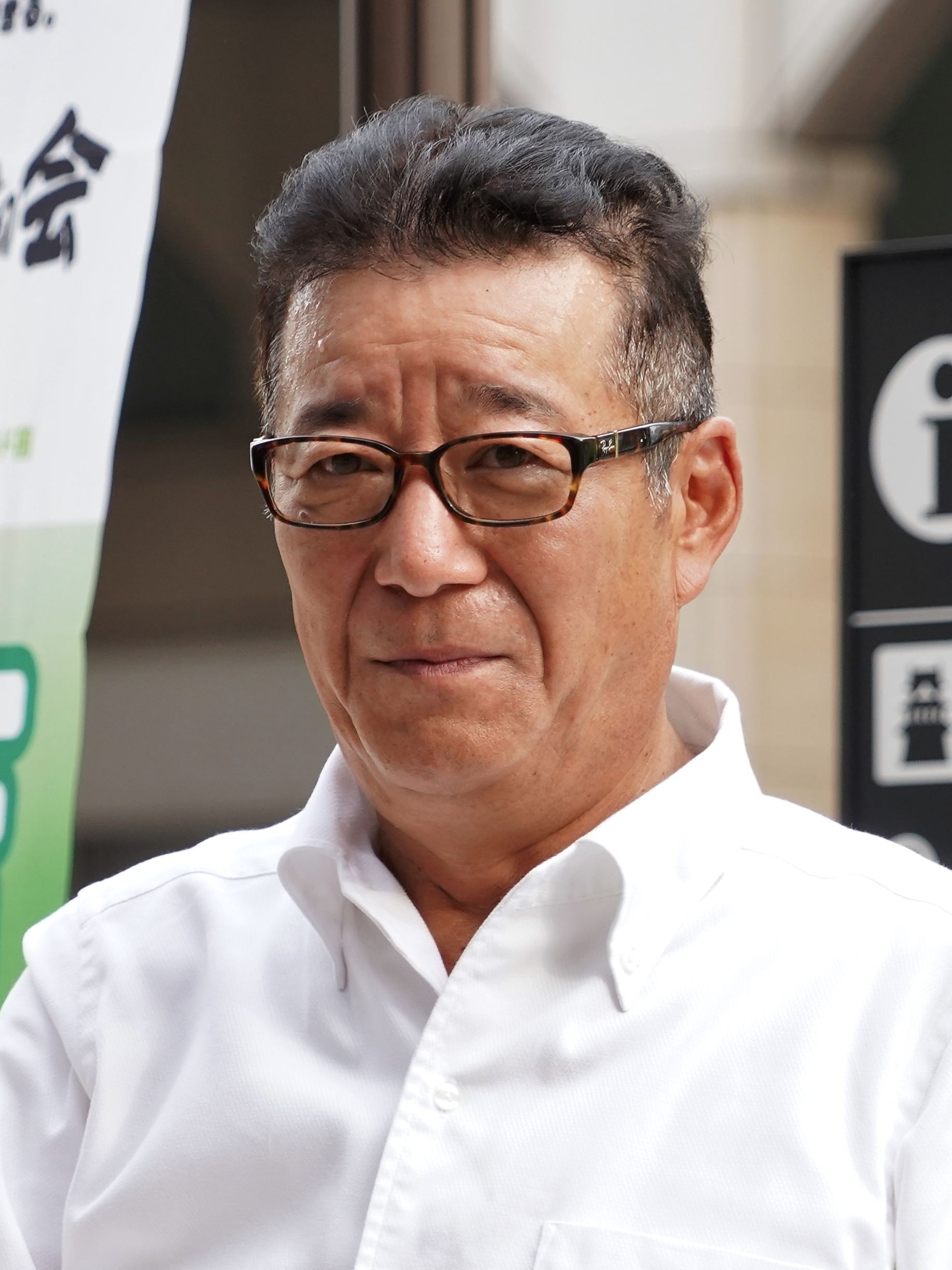
	Majority party	Minority party	Third party
Party	LDP	CDP	Komeito
Last election	11 seats	-	1 seats
Constituency	8	1	0
PR seats	3	1	1
Total	11	2	1
Seat change	Steady	New	Steady
	Fourth party	Fifth party	Sixth party
Party	Democratic Party for the People	Ishin	Independent
Last election	-	0 seats	1
Constituency	1	0	1
PR seats	0	1	-
Total	1	1	1
Seat change	New	▲1	Steady

The 2021 Japanese general election in Shikoku were held on October 31, 2021, to elect the 17 representatives, one from each of 11 Electoral districts and 6 proportional seats.

== Tokushima 1st district ==
2021 Tokushima 1st district election
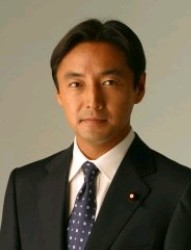
Nominee	Hirobumi Niki	Masazumi Gotoda	Tomoyo Yoshida
Party	Independent	LDP	Ishin
Popular vote	99,474	77,398	20,065
Percentage	50.05%	38.94%	10.10%
Japanese Representative before election
Masazumi Gotoda
LDP
Elected Japanese Representative
Hirobumi Niki
Independent

Incumbent				Elected Member	
Member	Party	First elected	Status	Member	Party
Masazumi Gotoda	LDP	2000	Incumbent defeated. (Won PR seat.)	Hirobumi Niki	Independent

Masazumi Gotoda, an incumbent member of the Liberal Democratic Party, was at odds with Tokushima Governor Kamon Iizumi and members of the LDP's Tokushima Prefectural Assembly. The Tokushima prefectural branch of the Liberal Democratic Party asked the LDP headquarters not to nominate Goto-ta as a candidate, but the headquarters nominated him as a candidate. But because of the split, Gotoda lost his seat to Hirobumi Niki, an independent opposition party, after failing to receive no support from the Tokushima prefectural branch. Later, Goto won a proportional representation seat and maintained his seat in the House of Representatives, but resigned to run for governor of Tokushima Prefecture in January 2023.

In April 2023, Gotoda was elected governor of Tokushima Prefecture for the first time, defeating incumbent Kamon Iizumi and Tōru Miki, who is former LDP member of the House of Councillors. About six months later, Niki, who ran as an independent opposition party, joined the LDP and LDP eventually regained the seat in this constituency.

== Tokushima 2nd district ==
2021 Tokushima 2nd district election
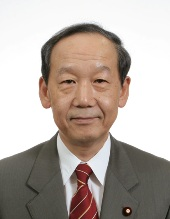
Nominee	Shunichi Yamaguchi	Mayumi Nakano
Party	LDP	CDP
Popular vote	76,879	43,473
Percentage	59.50%	33.65%
Japanese Representative before election
Shunichi Yamaguchi
LDP
Elected Japanese Representative
Shunichi Yamaguchi
LDP

Incumbent				Elected Member	
Member	Party	First elected	Status	Member	Party
Shunichi Yamaguchi	LDP	1990	Incumbent reelected.	Shunichi Yamaguchi	LDP

== Kagawa 1st district ==
2021 Kagawa 1st district election
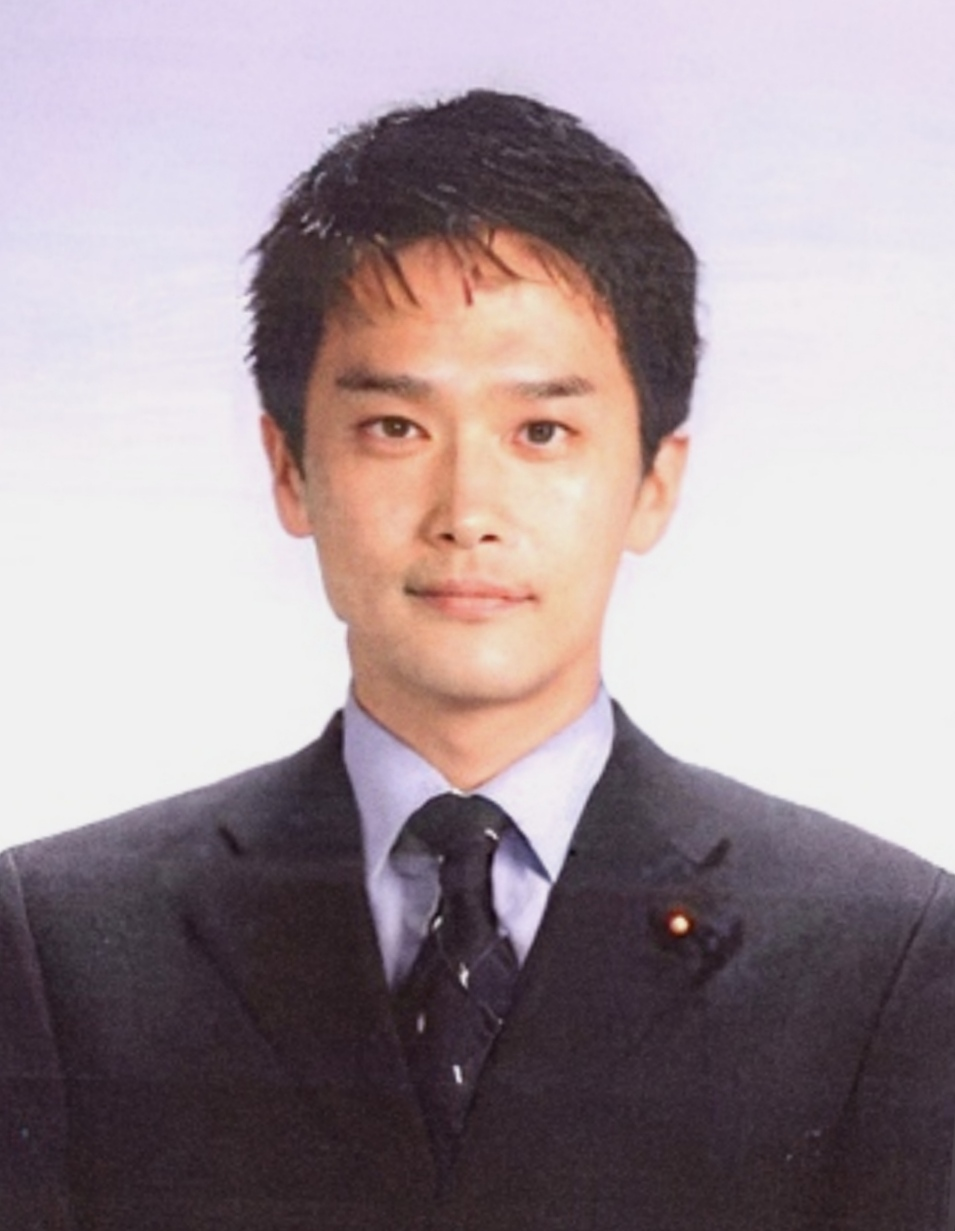

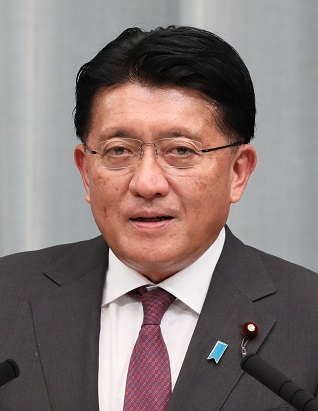
Nominee	Junya Ogawa	Takuya Hirai	Junko Machikawa
Party	CDP	LDP	Ishin
Popular vote	90,267	70,827	15,888
Percentage	51.00%	40.02%	8.98%
Japanese Representative before election
Takuya Hirai
LDP
Elected Japanese Representative
Junya Ogawa
CDP

Incumbent				Elected Member	
Member	Party	First elected	Status	Member	Party
Takuya Hirai	LDP	2000	Incumbent defeated. (Won PR seat.)	Junya Ogawa	CDP

== Kagawa 2nd district ==
2021 Kagawa 2nd district election
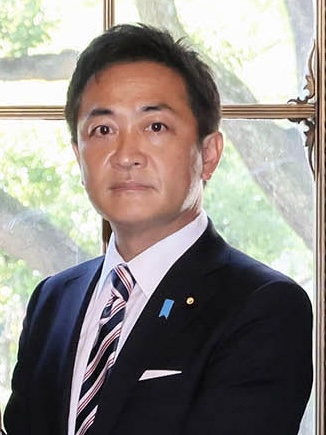
Nominee	Yuichiro Tamaki	Takakazu Seto
Party	Democratic Party for the People	LDP
Popular vote	94,530	54,334
Percentage	63.50%	36.50%
Japanese Representative before election
Yuichiro Tamaki
Democratic Party for the People
Elected Japanese Representative
Yuichiro Tamaki
Democratic Party for the People

Incumbent				Elected Member	
Member	Party	First elected	Status	Member	Party
Yuichiro Tamaki	DPP	2009	Incumbent reelected.	Yuichiro Tamaki	DPP

== Kagawa 3rd district ==
2021 Kagawa 3rd district election
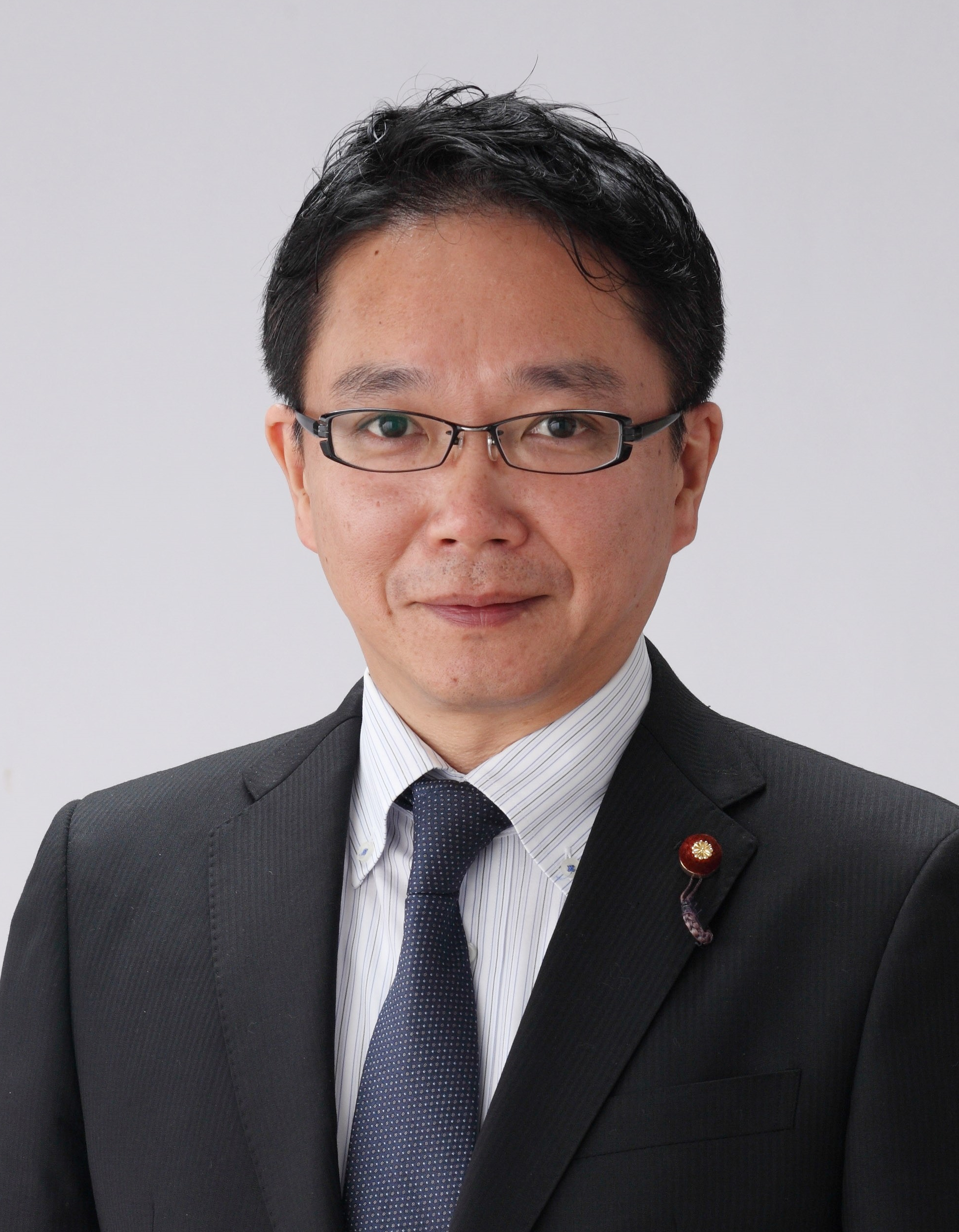
Nominee	Keitaro Ohno	Junichiro Ozaki
Party	LDP	JCP
Popular vote	94,437	23,937
Percentage	79.78%	20.22%
Japanese Representative before election
Keitaro Ohno
LDP
Elected Japanese Representative
Keitaro Ohno
LDP

Incumbent				Elected Member	
Member	Party	First elected	Status	Member	Party
Keitaro Ohno	LDP	2012	Incumbent reelected.	Keitaro Ohno	LDP

== Ehime 1st district ==
2021 Ehime 1st district election
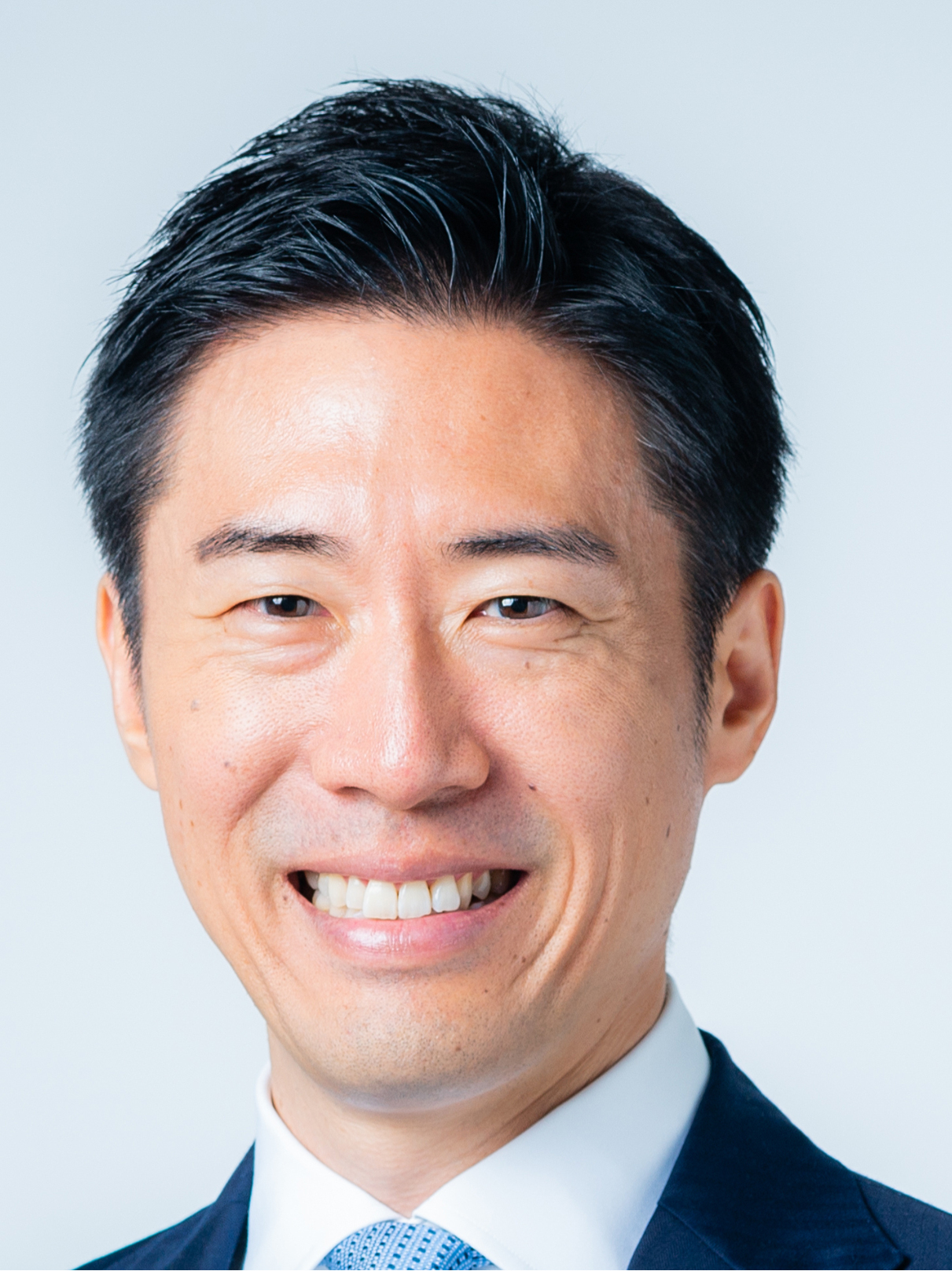
Nominee	Akihisa Shiozaki	Toshirō Tomochika
Party	LDP	CDP
Popular vote	119,633	77,091
Percentage	60.81%	39.19%
Japanese Representative before election
Yasuhisa Shiozaki
LDP
Elected Japanese Representative
Akihisa Shiozaki
LDP

Incumbent				Elected Member	
Member	Party	First elected	Status	Member	Party
Yasuhisa Shiozaki	LDP	2000	Incumbent retired. LDP hold.	Akihisa Shiozaki	LDP

== Ehime 2nd district ==
2021 Ehime 2nd district election
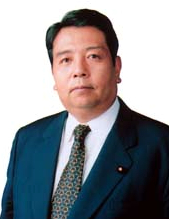
Nominee	Seiichiro Murakami	Tomoe Ishii	Rō Kataoka
Party	LDP	Democratic Party for the People	JCP
Popular vote	72,861	42,520	11,358
Percentage	57.49%	33.55%	8.96%
Japanese Representative before election
Seiichiro Murakami
LDP
Elected Japanese Representative
Seiichiro Murakami
LDP

Incumbent				Elected Member	
Member	Party	First elected	Status	Member	Party
Seiichiro Murakami	LDP	1986	Incumbent reelected.	Seiichiro Murakami	LDP

== Ehime 3rd district ==
2021 Ehime 3rd district election
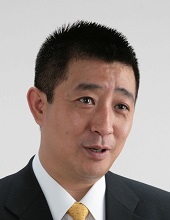

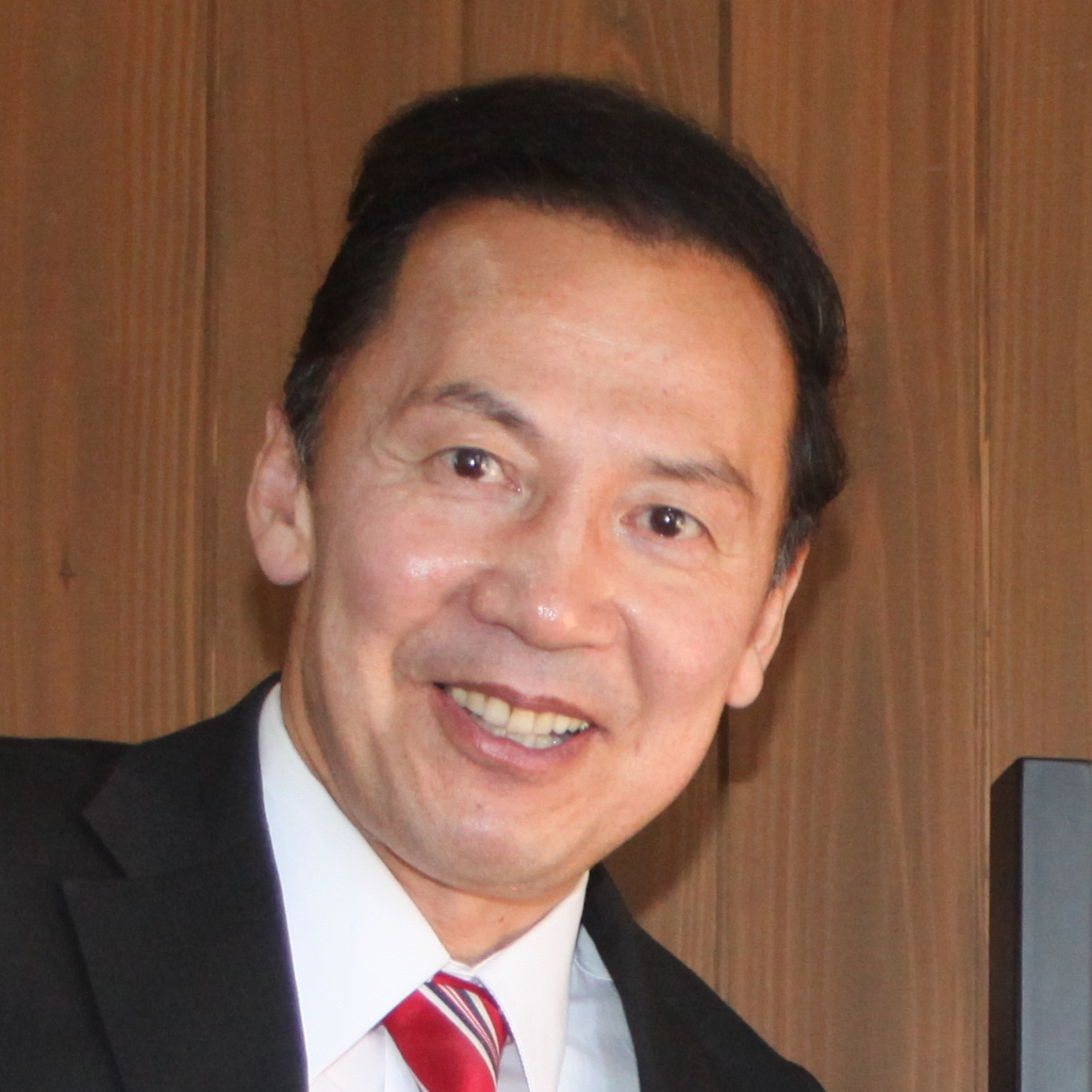
Nominee	Takumi Ihara	Yoichi Shiraishi
Party	LDP	CDP
Popular vote	76,263	71,600
Percentage	51.58%	48.42%
Junichiro before election
Yoichi Shiraishi
CDP
Elected Junichiro
Takumi Ihara
LDP

Incumbent				Elected Member	
Member	Party	First elected	Status	Member	Party
Yoichi Shiraishi	CDP	2009	Incumbent defeated. (Won PR seat.)	Takumi Ihara	LDP

== Ehime 4th district ==
2021 Ehime 4th district election
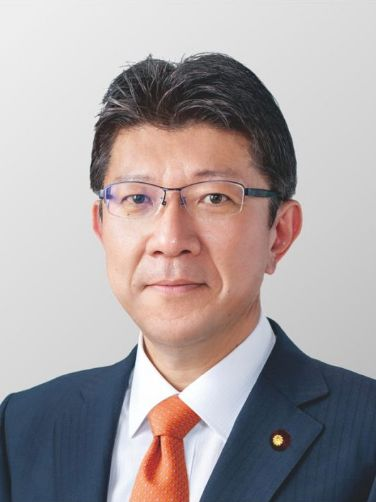
Nominee	Junji Hasegawa	Fumiki Sakurauchi	Naoto Nishii
Party	LDP	Independent	JCP
Popular vote	81,015	47,717	11,555
Percentage	56.59%	33.33%	8.07%
Junichiro before election
Koichi Yamamoto
LDP
Elected Junichiro
Junji Hasegawa
LDP

Incumbent				Elected Member	
Member	Party	First elected	Status	Member	Party
Koichi Yamamoto	CDP	1993	Incumbent retired. LDP hold.	Junji Hasegawa	LDP

== Kōchi 1st district ==
2021 Kōchi 1st district election
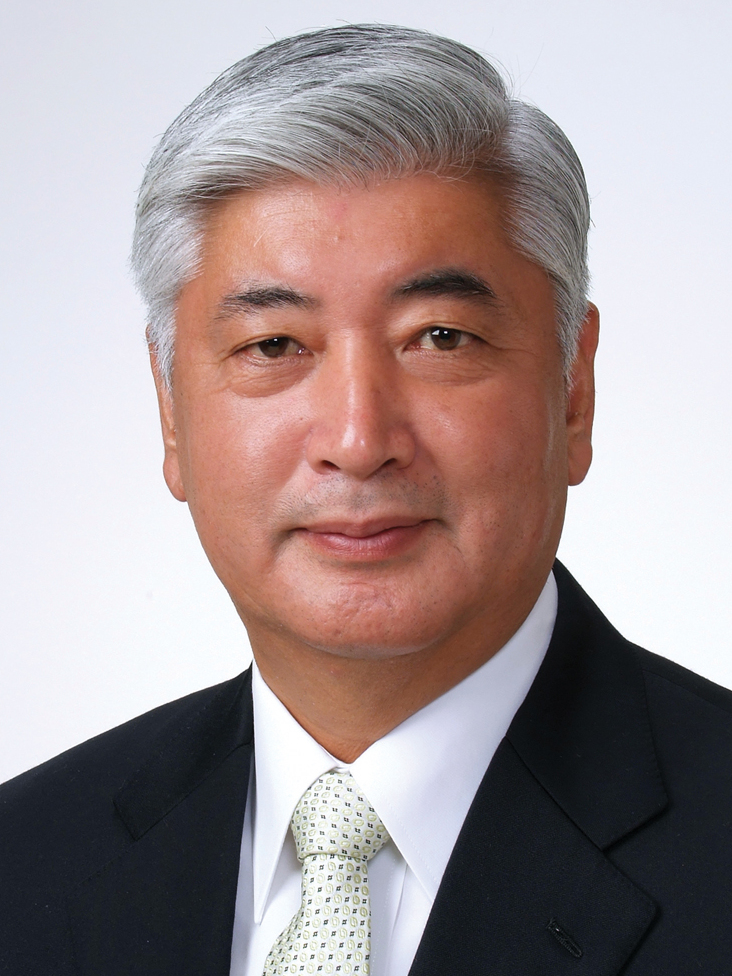
Nominee	Gen Nakatani	Norio Takeuchi
Party	LDP	CDP
Popular vote	104,837	50,033
Percentage	64.32%	30.70%
Japanese Representative before election
Gen Nakatani
LDP
Elected Japanese Representative
Gen Nakatani
LDP

Incumbent				Elected Member	
Member	Party	First elected	Status	Member	Party
Gen Nakatani	LDP	1990	Incumbent reelected.	Gen Nakatani	LDP

== Kōchi 2nd district ==
2021 Kōchi 2nd district election
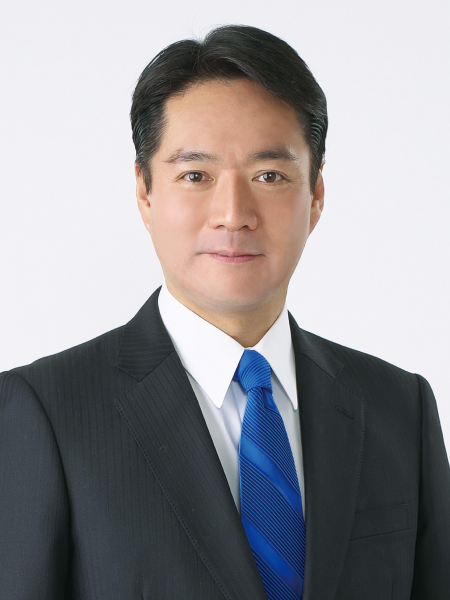

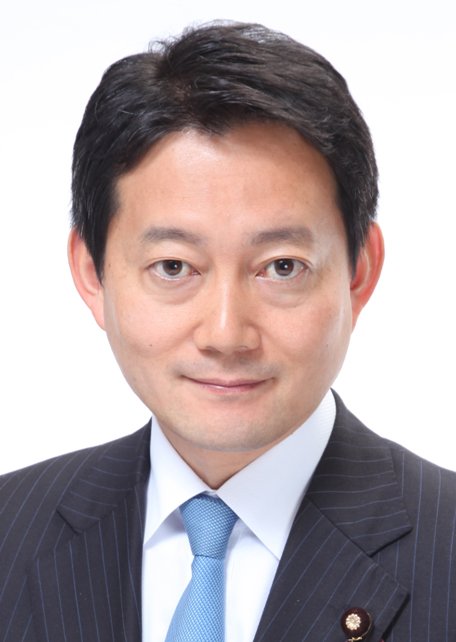
Nominee	Masanao Ozaki	Hajime Hirota
Party	LDP	CDP
Popular vote	117,810	55,214
Percentage	67.24%	31.52%
Japanese Representative before election
Hajime Hirota
CDP
Elected Japanese Representative
Masanao Ozaki
LDP

Incumbent				Elected Member	
Member	Party	First elected	Status	Member	Party
Hajime Hirota	CDP	2017	Incumbent defeated.	Masanao Ozaki	LDP

== Proportional representation block ==
Proportional Representation block results
Party	Votes	Percentage	Seats
LDP	664,805	39.1%	3
CDP	291,870	17.2%	1
Komeito	233,407	13.7%	1
Ishin	173,826	10.2%	1
DPP	122,082	7.2%	0
Communist	108,021	6.4%	0
Reiwa	52,941	3.1%	0
SDP	30,249	1.8%	0
Anti-NHK	21,285	1.3%	0

Party	Elected Member	District
LDP	Yūji Yamamoto	ー
LDP	Takuya Hirai	Kagawa 1st
LDP	Masazumi Gotoda	Tokushima 1st
CDP	Yoichi Shiraishi	Ehime 3rd
Komeito	Masayasu Yamasaki	ー
Ishin	Tomoyo Yoshida	Tokushima 1st
