= Takumi Ihara =

Japanese politician

- 井原 巧
- Official portrait, 2016

Member of the House of Representatives
- Incumbent
- Assumed office 9 February 2026
- Preceded by: Yoichi Shiraishi
- Constituency: Ehime 2nd
- In office 1 November 2021 – 9 October 2024
- Preceded by: Yoichi Shiraishi
- Succeeded by: Junji Hasegawa
- Constituency: Ehime 3rd

Member of the House of Councillors
- In office 29 July 2013 – 28 July 2019
- Preceded by: Toshirō Tomochika
- Succeeded by: Takako Nagae
- Constituency: Ehime at-large

Mayor of Shikokuchūō
- In office 28 April 2004 – 27 April 2013
- Preceded by: Office established
- Succeeded by: Minoru Shinohara

Member of the Ehime Prefectural Assembly
- In office 1995–2004
- Constituency: Iyomishima

Personal details
- Born: 13 November 1963 (age 62) Iyomishima, Ehime, Japan
- Party: Liberal Democratic
- Education: Senshu University

Takumi Ihara (井原 巧, Ihara Takumi; born 13 November 1963) is a Japanese politician of the Liberal Democratic Party, who serves as a member of the House of Representatives.

== Political career ==
In 1995, Ihara ran for the Ehime Prefectural Assembly and was elected.

In 2004, he resigned as a member of the Ehime Prefectural Assembly and ran for mayor of the newly established Shikokuchūō city. He was elected and became the 1st mayor of Shikokuchūō city.

In 2013, Ihara ran for Ehime at-large district nominated by LDP and was elected to the House of Councillors for the first time.

In 2016, he was appointed to Parliamentary vice-minister of Economy, Trade and Industry, Parliamentary vice-minister of the Cabinet Office, and Parliamentary vice-minister of Reconstruction.

In January 2019, Ihara announced that he would not run for the House of Councillors in July but would run for the House of Representatives for Ehime 3rd. It was announced at the same time that TV-personality Rakusaburo will run for the House of Councillors from Ehime at-large to replace Ihara.

In 2021, Ihara ran in the general election from Ehime 3rd and was elected for the first time by defeating CDP incumbent Yoichi Shiraishi.

In 2022, Constituencies in Ehime Prefecture was reduced from four to three due to the change in the division of the House of Representatives. Accordingly, Ihara would run for Newly Ehime 2nd and former Ehime 2nd Incumbent Seiichiro Murakami would ran in the Shikoku PR block.

In the 2024 LDP presidential election, Ihara voted for Shigeru Ishiba in both first votes and run-off votes.

On October 6, 2024, PM Ishiba decided not to nominate members who were suspended from their membership in the general election, and announced that 43 lawmakers, including Ihara, would not be allowed to run for proportional representation block because of the involvement in the slush fund scandal. In response to Ishiba's decision, Ihara accepted the decision, saying, "LDP and my faction have lost political trust, so if the party apologizes for it and wants to start anew, I have no choice but to take it seriously and do my best." However, Ihara added "I explained it at a press conference, explained it in the party's investigation, and there was no punishment related to the Party Ethics Committee."

In the 2024 general election, he ran for Ehime 2nd and lost to Shiraishi (CDP).

In the 2026 general election, he ran from Ehime 2nd and won the CRA's Shiraishi to regain his seat.

== Scandal ==
On 13 February 2024, LDP released the results of a survey of all Diet members belonging to the LDP over the slush fund scandal held by five LDP factions. It was revealed that Ihara used a total of 1.68 million yen as slush funds for five years from 2018 to 2022 as a kickback from the Seiwa Seisaku Kenkyūkai (Abe faction) for quota excess.

On 14 May 2024, the House of Representatives Political Ethics Committee unanimously passed the opposition's petition to attend and explain 44 LDP members who were involved in the slush fund scandal but did not explain themselves to the committee.

On 17 May 2024, the House of Councillors Political Ethics Committee unanimously passed a petition for attendance and explanation to 29 members who had not made excuses. All 73 Diet members, including Ihara, refused to attend, and the ordinary Diet session was closed on 23 June 2024.
