= Junya Ogawa =

Japanese politician (born 1971)

- 小川 淳也
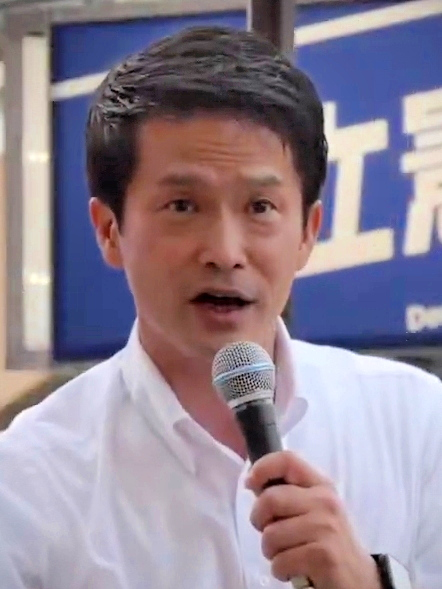
- Ogawa in 2025

President of the Democratic Reform Party
- Incumbent
- Assumed office 17 September 2026
- Preceded by: Party established
Previous party offices
President of the Centrist Reform Alliance
In office 13 February 2026 – 17 September 2026
Preceded by	Yoshihiko Noda; Tetsuo Saito
Succeeded by	Sō Watanabe (de facto)
Secretary-General of the Constitutional Democratic Party
In office 23 September 2024 – 11 September 2025
Leader	Yoshihiko Noda
Preceded by	Katsuya Okada
Succeeded by	Jun Azumi

Member of the House of Representatives
- Incumbent
- Assumed office 11 September 2005
- Preceded by: Miho Takai
- Constituency: Shikoku PR (2005–2009); Kagawa 1st (2009–2012); Shikoku PR (2012–2021); Kagawa 1st (2021–present)

Personal details
- Born: 18 April 1971 (age 55) Takamatsu, Kagawa, Japan
- Party: DRP (since 2026)
- Other political affiliations: DPJ (2005–2016); DP (2016–2017); KnT (2017–2018); Independent (2018–2020); CDP (2020–2026); CRA (2026); DRP (2026)
- Education: University of Tokyo

Junya Ogawa (Japanese: 小川 淳也, Hepburn: Ogawa Jun'ya; born 18 April 1971) is a Japanese politician who has been the president of the Democratic Reform Party (DRP) since September, 2026 and a member of the House of Representatives in the Diet (national legislature). A native of Takamatsu, Kagawa and graduate of the University of Tokyo, he joined the Ministry of Home Affairs in 1994. Leaving the ministry in 2003, he ran unsuccessfully for the House of Representatives in the same year. Two years later, he ran again and lost for a second time. He ran for a third time in 2009 and was elected for Kagawa 1st district.

After being elected, he became Parliamentary Vice-Minister for Internal Affairs and Communications in the Hatoyama Cabinet. He left the office once Naoto Kan became Prime Minister and served as a backbencher for the rest of the DPJ government. He lost his district but won a proportional seat amidst the DPJ faltering in 2012, and continued to hold his proportional seat under the post-2012 DPJ and its successor, the DP. In 2017, amidst the DP dissolving into Kibō no Tō, he ran under Tokyo Governor Yuriko Koike's new party, but began to clash with her stances and policy of expulsion for dovish DP members from the party. He was elected in the PR block again in 2017. He later declined to join the DPP and joined the CDP instead.

Amidst the release of Why You Can't Be Prime Minister in 2020, a documentary focused on Ogawa's political life, he gained popularity and name recognition across the country. After winning his district of Kagawa-1 for the first time since 2009 in the 2021 election, he ran in the leadership election to succeed Yukio Edano. After placing third and not making a run-off, he was appointed Chairman of the Policy Research Council by Kenta Izumi. He resigned from the position after the 2022 House of Councilors election. In the 2024 CDP leadership election, he declined to run himself, and backed Yoshihiko Noda. Noda appointed him Secretary-General of the party following his victory.

Ogawa, alongside Ichirō Ozawa and Noda, led the CDP to gain over 50 seats in the 2024 election, ending in the CDP having the greatest number of seats for an opposition party since 2003. He resigned from the role after the 2025 Councillor elections, and was one of seven Centrist Reform Alliance members to win a first-past-the-post district in 2026. He was elected president of the CRA following the 2026 leadership election and subsequently the DRP, after the CRA's effective dissolution.

== Early life and before politics ==
Ogawa was born in Matsunami ward in Takamatsu, inside of Kagawa Prefecture. His parents ran a beauty salon. After going through primary school, he attended Takamatsu High School, and thereafter joined the Faculty of Law at the University of Tokyo. He graduated in March 1994. Shortly after, in April, he joined the Ministry of Home Affairs (now the Ministry of Internal Affairs and Communications). Due to how the Ministry at the time worked, members could choose where to be assigned. Ogawa picked Okinawa, as he wanted to be as far from Tokyo as possible to experience different cultures. After a three-month apprenticeship with the Financial Bureau Coordination Office, he was assigned to work with the Okinawan Prefectural Government. Taking the opportunity, he soon after married a former classmate of his who had since become a kindergarten teacher. The following September, the 1995 Okinawa rape incident occurred as Ogawa was in Okinawa. On 21 October, Ogawa and his wife participated in a protest held in Ginowan against the incident.

In 1996, he was seconded to the Regional Comprehensive Development Foundation, which promotes developing cities within the private sector. He returned to the Ministry in 1997 from Okinawa, and was promoted to Section Chief. He worked over 300 hours of overtime per month, and returned home every night at close to 2 AM for nearly a year and a half. In 1999, he was assigned to the London office of the Council of Local Authorities for International Relations, an external organization of the Ministry of Home Affairs. He returned to Japan in 2000 and joined the Financial Services Agency.

In April 2001, he was seconded to the Kasugai City Hall and took up the post of Director of the Planning and Coordination Department. He worked under the mayor of Kasugai Ichiro Ukai, who he later cited as one of his major influences in politics. He stayed in Kasugai until 2003, before entering back into federal bureaucracy.

As Ogawa began to doubt working as a bureaucrat, he met Asahi Shimbun reporter Hiroshi Samejima. Samejima was a high school classmate of Ogawa, and Ogawa had bumped into him on the subway. At the time, Samejima was covering Naoto Kan, who was Secretary-General of the Democratic Party of Japan, and Deputy Secretary General Seiji Maehara. Kan and Maehara had been trying to recruit candidates for upcoming national elections. When Ogawa invited Samejima to sit down and talk, Samejima asked Ogawa for his thoughts on the DPJ, and the possibility of running in upcoming national elections. Ogawa enthusiastically responded to the idea, and soon after met Kan through Samejima, beginning to make preparations for his candidacy.

== Early politics ==
=== Entering politics ===
Ogawa was nominated under the DPJ, and ran in the Kagawa 1st district in 2003. He ran against incumbent Takuya Hirai, who had recently joined the LDP after having won in 2000 as an independent. Also in the race was Shigeaki Kato of the fading away SDP, and a Japanese Communist Party candidate along with a minor independent. He ended up losing by a margin of ten points, and was unable to be revived on proportional representation. Hirai was held below a majority.

He ran again in 2005 against Hirai. Despite a general rout of the DPJ, Ogawa was able to narrow the margin to just five points (only a JCP member ran, limiting the number of candidates to 3) and Ogawa was revived on the proportional block. It was his first successful election.

Soon after, in January 2006, he became the representative for the Kagawa Prefecture branch of the DPJ. When a leadership election was held in April, with Ichirō Ozawa and Naoto Kan competing against each other, Ogawa supported Ozawa.

When Ozawa resigned in May 2009 from leadership, Ogawa backed Katsuya Okada against Yukio Hatoyama in the leadership election.

=== DPJ government ===
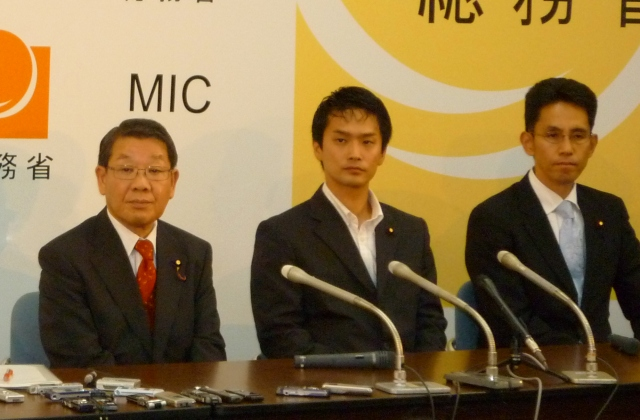
At a press conference on September 24, 2009, when he was appointed as Parliamentary Vice-Minister for Internal Affairs and Communications

Official portrait of Ogawa in 2009

When the Diet dissolved and a general election was held in August, he defeated Hirai by nearly ten points, marking the first time he won a district instead of being elected proportionally. Hirai was revived proportionally. Ogawa was appointed Parliamentary Vice-Minister for Internal Affairs and Communications in the Hatoyama Cabinet, and served in the role until the inauguration of the Kan Cabinet.

When the 2010 House of Councillors began, the LDP announced it would field Yoshihiko Isozaki, an employee of All Nippon Airways, for the Kagawa at-large district. The DPJ, SDP, and RENGO Kagawa unified behind Sumiko Okauchi, a former deputy mayor of Takamasu who ran as an independent. However, Okauchi lost by over ten points to Izozaki. On July 12, Ogawa resigned to take responsibility of Okauchi's defeat from the prefectural federation.

On August 26, 2011, Naoto Kan announced his resignation as Prime Minister. In the leadership election after, Ogawa was listed as a recommender for Seiji Maehara. He then supported Yoshihiko Noda against Banri Kaieda in the run-off. He was listed in Aera as one of the "100 people who will rebuild Japan".

In the September 2012 DPJ leadership election, he attempted to convince Goshi Hosono, who was serving as Minister of the Environment, to run for president. Despite Hosono initially agreeing, he was talked out of running by senior party members, and eventually gave up on gathering endorsements. In the general election held later that year, he was defeated by Hirai in a margin wider than his first ever election due to a nation-wide DPJ slaughter, with the DPJ nearly dropping below the third-party Japan Restoration Party. However, Ogawa was revived on the proportional block, which also made him the only DPJ politician to be elected from the Shikoku proportional representation block that year.

== Post-DPJ ==
=== After government ===
In February 2014, the DPJ Kagawa prefectural federation held a regular convention, and Ogawa was elected as the new representative, succeeding Yuichiro Tamaki. In the election the same year, Ogawa lost his district again, but was yet again revived on the PR block as the only DPJ representative. In the 2015 Democratic Party leadership election, he backed Goshi Hosono who lost to Katsuya Okada in a run-off.

On March 27, 2016, the Democratic Party of Japan and Japan Innovation Party merged to form the Democratic Party (2016). Ogawa became the head of the prefectural chapter of the party. The prefectural candidate began to try to field a candidate for the House of Councilors election that year, but had difficulty. In April, they began preparations to make Tanabe Kenichi the unified candidate, who was a prefectural standing committee member endorsed by the Japanese Communist Party. However, when Okano Shuriko, a prefectural assembly member of the Democratic Party, announced her candidacy, they leaned on consolidating around Okano. However, while the opposition were unifying behind candidates across the country, the JCP began to complain about the fact that they had none of their own candidates running in the election. Akira Koike, Secretary-General of the JCP, said he'd "wish to make Tanabe the unified opposition candidate" in Kagawa. Finally, in May, Ogawa called Okano to state the party was withdrawing from the constituency. Both Ogawa and Okano then held a press conference endorsing Tanabe. The Kagawa at-large constituency then became the only one of 32 single-seat constituencies to field a candidate endorsed by the JCP. Tanabe was defeated by incumbent Yoshihiko Isozaki. On July 11, Ogawa apologized for not fielding an independent candidate and announced his intention to resign as prefecture party head. (Note: Okono later switched to the LDP.)

He supported Seiji Maehara against Renhō during the 2016 Democratic Party leadership election. However, Maehara lost to Renhō.

On July 27, 2017, Renhō resigned after the results of the 2017 Tokyo prefectural election. Ogawa supported Maehara again in the leadership election which followed, where he won against Yukio Edano. The following day, Maehara holed up in a hotel room with Ogawa and Atsushi Oshima, who acted as his campaign manager in the leadership election. On 5 September, the Democratic Party held a general meeting of both houses of parliament and approved the executive personnel changes proposed by Maehara. Ogawa was appointed head of the executive office of the Democratic Party.

=== 2017 election ===
On 26 September 2017, Governor of Tokyo Yuriko Koike, who had by this time formed Kibō no Tō, met with Democratic Party chairman Seiji Maehara and RENGO Japan President Rikio Kozu in secret. They agreed to merge the Democratic Party together with Kibo no To for the upcoming general election, a day after Abe dissolved the Diet. On 28 September, the Democratic Party held a general meeting of both houses of the Diet and agreed to merge into Koike's party. A day later, Ogawa responded to an interview by the Mainichi Shimbun, saying that "I think its a just cause in confronting the (LDP-Komeito) government," and expressed positive feelings towards the merger. He opened an election office on 1 October in Takamatsu. He announced he would be leaving the Democratic Party and apply for official recognition for a candidacy under Kibō no Tō a day later. He received official recognition on the third, along with 191 other candidates. The Japanese Communist Party prefectural chairman Akio Matsubara stated that they would "reward Mr. Ogawa for his efforts" in fielding a communist endorsed candidate for the House of Councilors the previous year. In the end, they did not field a candidate against Ogawa in Kagawa-1, the first time they had not done so since the creation of single member districts. This also created a unique distinction for Ogawa, where, despite switching to a more conservative opposition party, he was nevertheless supported by the JCP. The SDP, however, declined to endorse Ogawa, citing his switch to Kibo no To.

On 6 October, Koike announced the electoral platform of Kibo no To. In the nine point policy collection, she resolved to "Advance the debate on constitutional amendment, including Article 9", and "build a diplomatic and security system based on realism." When it became clear Koike would accept security legislation and constitutional amendment, and refused to accept Democratic Party members who had declined to endorse such policy, Ogawa began to dissent from the party. Despite having received the party's endorsement, he argued that "the exercise of the right of collective self-defense is strongly suspected to be unconstitutional." Along with Kazunori Yamanoi and Michiyoshi Yunoki, he openly rallied against Koike's line. At a rally on 15 October, he stated that "Its wrong to use Koike's pressure to sign the policy agreement as a test of loyalty." A day later, at a separate rally, he said "Koike's words, such as 'exclusion', are terrible. My policy beliefs will not change." As a result, Seiji Maehara suddenly cancelled a street speech he was supposed to give that day.

On the general election held six days later, he lost to Takuya Hirai by just over 2,000 votes. With such a narrow margin of defeat, however, he was elected as the only Kibo no To representative on the Shikoku PR block. On 27 October, Kibō no Tō held a general meeting of representatives from both chambers and opted to vote for party co-chair Shu Wantanabe for Prime Minister. Ogawa openly advocated for instead voting for Yukio Edano of the Constitutional Democratic Party of Japan in front of Yuriko Koike at the meeting. He also parted ways with Maehara, who had pushed for the dissolution of the Democratic Party. In the party's executive changes following the 2017 leadership election, he was appointed Chairman of the Social Security System Research Council.

=== Post-2017 ===
On 7 May 2018, the Democratic Party merged with the remaining members of Kibō no Tō into the Democratic Party For the People. Ogawa held a press conference at the prefectural office and announced he would not join the new party, instead remaining independent for the time being.

On 9 September, he announced his intention to sit with the CDP's parliamentary group in the House of Representatives as an independent, and joined the following day. Following him joining, he was appointed as special assistant to the party's secretary-general. He was appointed as advisor to the Kagawa CDP branch when it was established on the 11th of September.

On 13 June 2020, the documentary film Why You Can't Be Prime Minister was released across Japan. The film followed Ogawa around from his first election in 2003, and gave special focus to the high-stress situation Ogawa was placed in in 2017. It also looked at the struggle of opposition parties in the Shinzo Abe era of Japan. The film was considered a hit, and won the Kinema Junpo award for Best Cultural Film in 2020.

== Constitutional Democratic Party ==
=== Pre-leadership ===
On 24 August, Tetsuro Fukuyama, who was serving as Secretary-General of the Constitutional Democratic Party, and Hirofumi Hirano, who was serving as Secretary-General of the Democratic Party For the People, met with Kōichirō Genba, who was a member of the technical Group of Independents, and Ogawa, who sat with a group of technical independents led by Katsuya Okada. The four agreed to merge and form a technical new party with the same name and branding as the former Constitutional Democratic Party. In the leadership election following the merger, he was an endorser of Yukio Edano.

After the Diet session ended on 16 June 2021, Ogawa began to visit Shōdoshima regularly. Since the difference in votes between Hirai and Ogawa had been tiny in the previous election, over a thousand of the two-thousand vote margin came from the towns of Shōdoshima-Town and Tonoshō on the island. Since losing votes on the island would be critical, both camps began to visit the tiny island more and more. From 25 July onward, Ogawa and his policy secretary were stationed on Shōdoshima, and had him visit over 500 businesses. In early August, together with Kishirō Nakamura, he toured stone and soy sauce brewing industries, long-standing businesses which are considered close to the LDP.

He also continued to hold open-air rallies in which he answered questions and suggestions from the audience in his constituency, mostly in Takamatsu. Also in June, "The group to support Junya Ogawa" was launched, mainly consisting of middle-aged women. A social media team was also formed, mostly consisting of photographers and designers who support Ogawa, and began to assist in making his Instagram and YouTube posts. Ogawa also began to hire aspiring filmmakers as volunteers to help film his social media posts.

On the evening of 4 October, new Prime Minister Fumio Kishida announced he would be dissolving the Diet in preparations for new elections. On the same day, Junko Machikawa, a former Diet member secretary from Miki, Kagawa, announced she would run in the district. She at the time lived in Sapporo. (Note: Junko Machikawa had previously run in several other elections, including the 2009 House of Representatives election, 2012 elections, and 2013 House of Councilors election, all with the New Party Daichi in Hokkaido.) On 8 October, Nippon Ishin no Kai announced it had decided to field Machikawa as a candidate in the district. As Machikawa had previously served as the first public secretary to Yuichiro Tamaki, there were posts on Twitter suggesting that Tamaki had been involved in fielding Machikawa against Ogawa. On 10 October, Tamaki posted on Twitter that "I have nothing to do with fielding a candidate for Nippon Ishin no Kai in the Kagawa 1st district, and I have no intention of being involved in it in the future." On 12 October, the Shikoku Shimbun published an article titled "Ishin newcomer forced to give up running: CDP's Ogawa in Kagawa 1st district." On 15 October, Machikawa responded to an interview with the Shikoku Shimbun, revealing that a LDP prefectural assembly member had encouraged them to run in the Kagawa 3rd district. (Note: In the 11 November 2021 issue of Shukan Bunshun, Machikawa testified, "One day before Mr. Ogawa, the LDP Prefectural Assembly Member also requested that he withdraw her nomination. They said, 'We will provide election funds, so please run in the 3rd district (of Kagawa)'. I think both Mr. Hirai and the LDP were quite anxious.") The same day, she officially announced her candidacy for the district.

On 19 October, the election was officially announced. Ogawa, Hirai, and Machikawa all ran in the district. The Shikoku Shimbun analyzed the early stages of the election based on a telephone poll conducted by Kyodo News on the 19th and 20th, as well as information obtained through interviews. On October 21, the newspaper reported that "Ogawa was in the lead, followed by Hirai." After the election closed on 31 October, The Asahi Shimbun reported shortly after polls closed that Ogawa had won the district. Hirai, who had lost the district for the first time since 2009, was elected through proportional representation. Machikawa's vote share was below 10%, so she lost her election deposit.

=== Leadership run and after ===
On 2 November, after disappointing results at large for the CDP in the election, party leader Yukio Edano announced his resignation. On the same day, after receiving his certificate of victory, Ogawa expressed eagerness to run in the leadership election. He announced he had acquired the 20 sponsors necessary on 18 November. On the nineteenth, the four candidates were announced; Kenta Izumi, Ogawa, Seiji Osaka, and Chinami Nishimura. However, it was not clear who, if anyone, would receive a majority in the first round, so the focus became who would advance to the second. Izumi was widely seen as likely to win the first round. On 30 November, Ogawa's camp, confident he would place second, approached the Nishimura and Osaka camps to lobby for a "2nd-4th" coalition. They agreed, and the run-off was projected as having Ogawa at 160 points, compared to Izumi at 125. Ogawa would win, unless Izumi won all 19 Diet members who were unsure of who to vote. As the vote was held on the 30th, Ogawa's regional votes were sluggish compared to Seiji Osaka's, and he fell to third. Izumi then won the run-off between candidates by a wide margin. On 1 December, Izumi announced personnel changes. Ogawa was appointed Chairman of the Policy Research Council. He was officially appointed to the position a day later during a general meeting of both houses of the Diet.

During the leadership election, Ogawa began holding "Open-Air Dialogue Meetings" in front of the Yurakucho ITOSIA building in Chiyoda, Tokyo. He held a total of eight before the leadership election. From the 14 December meeting, which party leader Izumi attended, onward, they became party-endorsed events at his request. They were held every Tuesday in front of the Yurakucho Station, with the exception of the 18 December meeting, which was held in Nago in Okinawa, which has historically been a pocket of controversy over the Relocation of Marine Corps Air Station Futenma.

On 24 December, a sequel to Why You Can't Be Prime Minister was released, titled Kagawa 1st District. The film focused on the battle between Ogawa, Hirai, and Machikawa over the district in 2021.

With the CDP losing seats in the 2022 House of Councilors election, Ogawa called for a shake-up of the CDP's executive committee, excluding Izumi. On August 10, the CDP's extraordinary standing Executive Committee approved the House of Councillors election summary, and on the following day, August 11, he announced his intention to step down as Chairman of the Policy Research Council.

On 15 May 2023, CDP leader Kenta Izumi appeared on BS Fuji's news program "Prime News" and stated that the party would not collaborate with the Japanese Communist Party or Nippon Ishin no Kai in the next general election. The JCP protested the statement. On 22 May, the party stated its intention to field candidate in single member districts, even where it may conflict with the CDP. On 16 June, Ogawa and other members of the CDP launched the "Association of Volunteers to Achieve a Change of Government by Unifying Opposition Candidates", and held a press conference, calling on Izumi to change course. The group was started by Ogawa, Tomoko Abe, Shūji Inatomi, Ichirō Ozawa, Sayuri Kamata, Makiko Kikuta, Yoshio Tezuka, Kazuhiro Haraguchi, Kenko Matsuki, Michiyoshi Yunoki, and Shunji Yuhara. Fifty-three members of the House of Representatives, more than half of the party's members, supported the proposal, and an "anti-Izumi" movement began to spring up inside of it.

=== Secretary-General ===
During the 2024 CDP presidential election, Sanctuary, the faction Ogawa was first vice-chairman in, decided to support Yukio Edano. However, Ogawa expressed his support for Yoshihiko Noda, and Ogawa submitted his resignation from the faction to express support for Noda. On September 24, after the election, Noda, who was elected as the new leader, announced that Ogawa would be appointed Secretary-General of the CDP. However, Noda's personnel changes drew criticism from other camps in the leadership election, who called it favouritism for supporting Noda. One party executive said that Ogawa, who had not previously handled party affairs, would "probably be puppeted by Hiroshi Ogushi."

The 2024 election was held shortly thereafter. Five candidates ran in Kagawa's 1st; Ogawa, Hirai, and Machikawa all returned, and newcomers Naomi Kobayashi of Sanseito and Kenichi Tanabe of the JCP also ran. The LDP faced strong headwinds due to several scandals that had broken out, such as the slush fund and Unification Church issues that had caused crisis for the party. It was quickly announced after the end of voting that Ogawa had been re-elected in Kagawa's 1st, and he was re-elected for a seventh term. Since the LDP won three seats on the Shikoku PR block, and one automatically went to Seiichiro Murakami who was placed on the top of the list, the remaining two went to defeated candidates, one of which was Hirai. He had the narrowest margin of defeat despite losing by nearly twenty points.

During the vote counting for the 2025 House of Councillors election, he appeared on NHK and spoke as the party's secretary-general, saying "I would like to express my deepest respect for the cooperation with the DPP and Sanseito, which are expected to make great strides. I would like to respond with sincerity." All three parties ended up being evenly matched in proportional representation, winning seven seats each. He resigned as Secretary-General and was replaced by Jun Azumi in September following the House of Councillors election.

== Centrist Reform Alliance ==
In January 2026, he joined the Centrist Reform Alliance, a new party formed by the merger of the CDP and Komeito. He defeated Hirai again in the 2026 by a narrow margin of just 800 votes, and was one of just seven CRA candidates to win their districts. Had Ogawa lost, he would not have stayed in the House of Representatives, as the one seat the CRA won on the Shikoku PR block was taken up by Masayasu Yamasaki, a former Komeito member.

== Political views ==
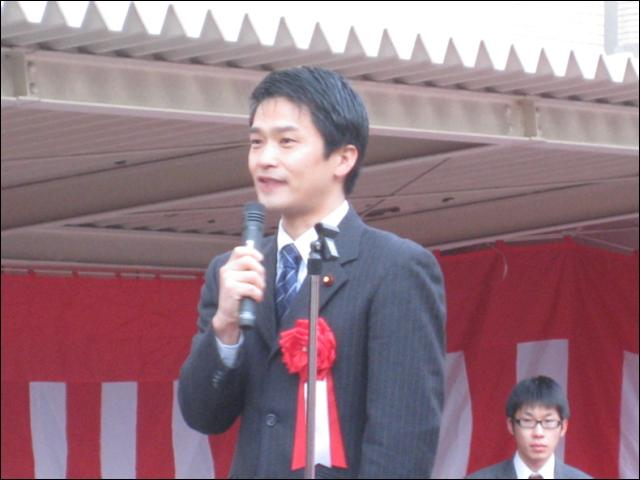
Greetings at the New Year's Day delivery ceremony for the Takamatsu branch of the Japan Post, 1 January 2010

=== Promoting cooperation with opposition parties ===
Ogawa is a major advocate of cooperation with all opposition parties, including the Japanese Communist Party. While working as the Head of the Kagawa Prefectural Chapter of the Democratic Party, he worked hard to eliminate the "Communist allergy" that much of the DP had fallen to. He signed a memorandum of understanding with the JCP prefectural branch in Kagawa regarding the protection of private property, the continuation of the JSDF, the preservation of the emperor system, the protection of the parliamentary system, and the protection of other human rights in order to establish a unified candidate for the 2016 House of Councilors election. Regarding general cooperation with the JCP, after becoming a special assistant to the Secretary-General of the CDP, he attended a speech event hosted by the Communist Party in December 2018 and appealed "This time, let's do serious opposition cooperation."

In December 2018 also, he contributed an article to the Mainichi Shimbun in which he stated "I pride myself on being a staunch supporter of opposition alliances. I believe that the CDP should be in a position to lead the opposition alliance." He also identifies himself as a supporter of merging with other opposition parties. He said that "If we could all merge together, from the DPP to the Communist Party, and create a huge centrist liberal party in this country, we could create an opposition party that can seriously compete with the LDP." He also advocates merging with the JCP and Reiwa Shinsengumi to form a new party.

== Notes ==
Party political offices
Preceded by Kenta Izumi	Chairman of the Policy Research Council, Constitutional Democratic Party; 2021–2022	Succeeded by Akira Nagatsuma
Preceded by Katsuya Okada	Secretary General of the Constitutional Democratic Party; 2024–2025	Succeeded by Jun Azumi
Preceded by Yoshihiko Noda; Tetsuo Saito	President of the Centrist Reform Alliance; 2026–present	Incumbent
