= Yoshinori Ohno =

Japanese politician (1935–2023)

- 大野 功統
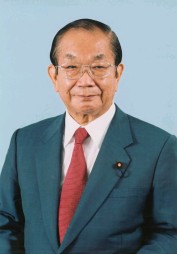
- Official portrait, 2004

Director-General of the Japan Defense Agency
- In office 27 September 2004 – 31 October 2005
- Prime Minister: Junichiro Koizumi
- Preceded by: Shigeru Ishiba
- Succeeded by: Fukushiro Nukaga

Member of the House of Representatives
- In office 6 July 1986 – 16 November 2012
- Preceded by: Tsunetarō Katō
- Succeeded by: Keitaro Ohno
- Constituency: Kagawa 2nd (1986–1996); Kagawa 3rd (1996–2012)

Personal details
- Born: 16 October 1935 Taiwan, Empire of Japan
- Died: 16 July 2023 (aged 87)
- Party: Liberal Democratic
- Children: Keitaro Ohno
- Relatives: Tsunetarō Katō (father-in-law)
- Education: University of Tokyo (LLB)

Yoshinori Ohno (大野 功統 Ōno Yoshinori; 16 October 1935 – 16 July 2023) was a Japanese politician who served as Minister of State for Defense in Prime Minister Junichiro Koizumi's third Cabinet from 2004 to 2005. He was a member of the Liberal Democratic Party.

== Life and career ==
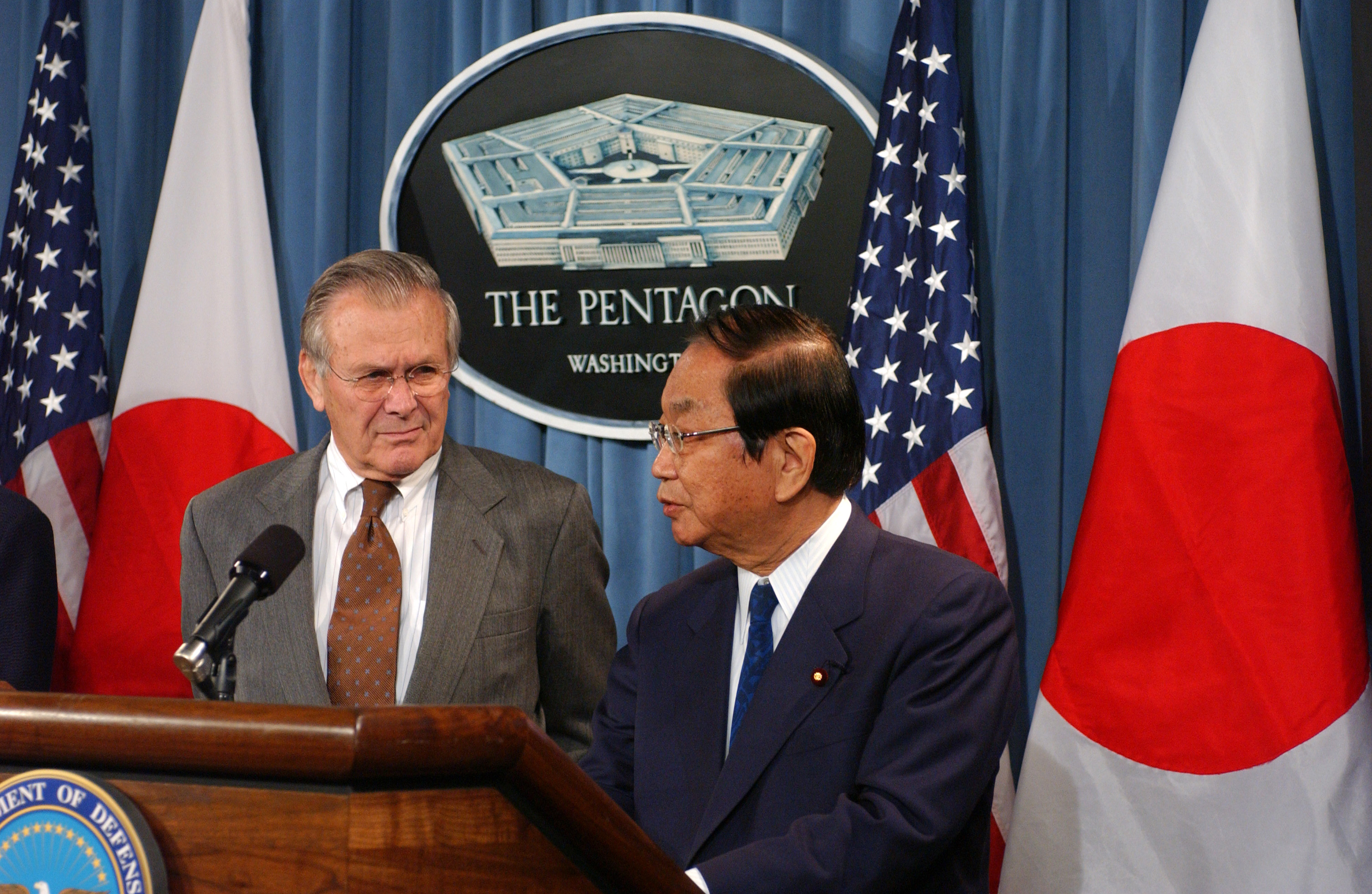
Ohno with Donald Rumsfeld at The Pentagon in 2005

Ohno was born in Taiwan (then under Japanese rule) in 1935 and return to Japan in 1947 and settled in Toyohama-cho, Mitoyo-gun, Kagawa Prefecture (now Kannonji City). He graduated from Takamatsu Daiichi Senior High School and then went on to study law at University of Tokyo in the Graduate School for Law and Politics. After university he began his career with the Ministry of Finance. After an unsuccessful bid as Governor of Kagawa Prefecture in 1978, Ohno was elected to the House of Representatives for Kagawa Prefecture in 1986 (and as member of the Kagawa Prefecture's 3rd District after 1996). From 2004 to 2005 he was Director General of the Japan Defense Agency.

Ohno died on 16 July 2023, at the age of 87.
