= Shinya Ono =

Japanese politician

- 小野 晋也
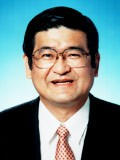
- Official portrait, 2003

Member of the House of Representatives
- In office 18 July 1993 – 16 November 2009
- Preceded by: Takatoshi Fujita
- Succeeded by: Yoichi Shiraishi
- Constituency: Ehime 2nd (1993–1996); Ehime 3rd (1996–2009)

Member of the Ehime Prefectural Assembly
- In office 30 April 1983 – 20 January 1991
- Constituency: Niihama City

Personal details
- Born: 28 April 1955 (age 71) Niihama, Ehime, Japan
- Party: Liberal Democratic
- Education: University of Tokyo

Shinya Ono (小野 晋也; born 28 April 1955) is a former Japanese politician of the Liberal Democratic Party, who was a member of the House of Representatives in the Diet.

== Early life ==
Ono is a native of Niihama, Ehime. He graduated the University of Tokyo and received a master's degree in aerospace engineering.

== Political career ==
Ono was elected to the Ehime Prefectural Assembly in 1983, and then to the House of Representatives in 1993.

In 2008, he expressed his intention not to stand as a candidate in the next general election, and left the national political arena with the dissolution of the House of Representatives in 2009.

He sees himself as working as "a politician out of power" now, and publishes the monthly magazine "OAK-TREE".
