= Kagawa 3rd district =

Kagawa's 3rd House of representatives single member district

Kagawa 3rd District
- 香川県第3区
- Parliamentary constituency for the Japanese House of Representatives
- Prefecture: Kagawa
- Proportional District: Shikoku
- Electorate: 235,220 (as of September 2023)

Current constituency
- Created: 1994
- Seats: One
- Party: LDP
- Representative: Keitaro Ohno

Kagawa 3rd district (香川県第1区, Kagawa-ken dai-san-ku) is a single-member constituency of the House of Representatives of Japan. The district was established in 1994.

From 2012, the representative for the district is Keitaro Ohno, a member of the LDP. Previously, from its creation in 1996, the district was represented by Ohno's father, Yoshinori Ohno.

== Area ==
- Marugame city (excluding the former towns of Ayauta and Hanzan)
- Zentsūji city
- Kan'onji city
- Mitoyo city
- Nakatado District

== Elected representatives ==
Representatives	Party	Years served	Notes
Yoshinori Ohno	LDP	1996 – 2012	
Keitaro Ohno	LDP	2012 –	

== Election results ==
2026
Party	Candidate	Votes	%	±%
LDP	Keitaro Ohno	71,529	59.1	▲4.0
DPP	Tomomitsu Kawasaki	36,043	29.8	
Ishin	Shūhei Hosokawa	13,440	11.1	▼2.9
Registered electors		228,662		
Turnout			54.99	▲4.6
LDP hold				

2024
Party	Candidate	Votes	%	±%
LDP	Keitaro Ohno	62,545	55.1	▼24.7
CDP	Hiromi Ooka	29,900	26.3	
Ishin	Shūhei Hosokawa	15,902	14.0	
JCP	Takashi Sasai	5,166	4.6	▼15.7
Registered electors		231,916		
Turnout			50.4	▼1.2
LDP hold				

2021
Party	Candidate	Votes	%	±%
LDP	Keitaro Ohno	94,437	79.8	▲10.7
JCP	Junichirō Ozaki	23,937	20.2	
Registered electors		240,033		
Turnout			51.6	▲1.7
LDP hold				

2017
Party	Candidate	Votes	%	±%
LDP	Keitaro Ohno	82,125	69.1	▲0.9
Social Democratic	Shinji Fujita	36,735	30.9	▲7.7
Turnout			49.9	▲2.3
LDP hold				

2014
Party	Candidate	Votes	%	±%
LDP	Keitaro Ohno	76,281	68.2	▲5.5
Social Democratic	Yoshinori Takata	25,899	23.2	▼8.3
JCP	Ichirō Toki	9,688	8.7	▲2.9
Turnout			47,6	
LDP hold				

2012
Party	Candidate	Votes	%	±%
LDP	Keitaro Ohno	85,463	62.7	▲19.4
Social Democratic	Haruhiko Maida	42,907	31.5	▼0.3
JCP	Hitoshi Fujida	7,888	5.8	▲1.5
LDP hold				

2009
Party	Candidate	Votes	%	±%
LDP	Yoshinori Ohno	73,379	43.3	▼23.6
Social Democratic	Haruhiko Maida	53,822	31.8	▲7.5
Independent	Takeshi Manabe	32,963	19.5	
JCP	Michiko Chikaishi	7,325	4.3	▼4.5
Happiness Realization	Mayumi Senoo	1,886	1.1	
LDP hold				

2005
Party	Candidate	Votes	%	±%
LDP	Yoshinori Ohno	107,726	66.9	▲5.8
Social Democratic	Kenji Okuda	39,177	24.3	▲7.7
JCP	Michiko Chikaishi	14,086	8.8	▲2.4
LDP hold				

2003
Party	Candidate	Votes	%	±%
LDP	Yoshinori Ohno	84,803	61.1	▲1.2
Social Democratic	Kenji Okuda	23,087	16.6	▼8.4
Democratic	Tooru Yamamoto	22,091	15.9	New
JCP	Michiko Chikaishi	8,898	6.4	▼8.7
LDP hold				

2000
Party	Candidate	Votes	%	±%
LDP	Yoshinori Ohno	90,690	59.9	▲11.0
Social Democratic	Kenji Okuda	37,759	25.0	▲17.0
JCP	Yōko Shirakawa	22,887	15.1	▲10.2
LDP hold				

1996
Party	Candidate	Votes	%	±%
LDP	Yoshinori Ohno	79,870	48.9	
New Frontier	Shigeaki Tsukihara	62,468	38.3	
Social Democratic	Kenji Okuda	13,026	8.0	
JCP	Kōichi Nakatani	7917	4.9	
Turnout			67.5	
LDP win (new seat)				
