= Toshirō Tomochika =

Japanese footballer and politician

- 友近 聡朗

Member of the House of Councillors
- In office 29 July 2007 – 4 December 2012
- Preceded by: Katsutsugu Sekiya
- Succeeded by: Takumi Ihara
- Constituency: Ehime at-large

Personal details
- Born: 24 April 1975 (age 51) Matsuyama, Ehime, Japan
- Party: Constitutional Democratic (since 2021)
- Other political affiliations: Democratic (2007–2012); People's Life First (2012); Tomorrow (2012); Independent (2012–2021)
- Education: Waseda University
Association football career
- Height: 1.65 m (5 ft 5 in)
- Position: Forward
Youth career
- 1994–1997: Waseda University
Senior career*
Years	Team	Apps	(Gls)
1998	Ehime FC		
1999	Göttingen		
2000	Tuspo Waldau		
2001–2006	Ehime FC	122	(51)
- * Club domestic league appearances and goals

Toshiro Tomochika (友近 聡朗, Tomochika Toshirō; born April 24, 1975) is a former Japanese football player and politician. He is an independent member of the House of Councillors in the Diet (national legislature) and is a native of Matsuyama, Ehime. He graduated from Waseda University and was elected for the first time in 2007.

== Career statistics ==
Appearances and goals by club, season and competition
Club	Season	League			Emperor's Cup		Total	
Club	Season	Division	Apps	Goals	Apps	Goals	Apps	Goals
Ehime FC	2001	Football League	27	6			27	6
Ehime FC	2002	Football League	13	2			13	2
Ehime FC	2003	Football League	27	18			27	18
Ehime FC	2004	Football League	27	16			27	16
Ehime FC	2005	Football League	26	9	1	1	27	10
Ehime FC	2006	J2 League	2	0			2	0
Career total			122	51	1	1	123	123
