= Ehime 3rd district =

- Parliamentary constituency for the Japanese House of Representatives
- Numbered map of the Ehime Prefecture single seats
- Prefecture: Ehime
- Proportional District: Shikoku
- Electorate: 298,778

Current constituency
- Created: 1994
- Seats: One
- Party: LDP
- Representative: Junji Hasegawa
- Municipalities: Iyo, Ōzu, Seiyo, Uwajima, Tōon, Yawatahama, Iyo District, Kamiukena District, Kita District, Kitauwa District, Minamiuwa District, and Nishiuwa District.

Ehime 3rd district (愛媛県第3区, Ehime-ken dai-sanku or simply 愛媛3区, Ehime-sanku) is a single-member constituency of the House of Representatives in the national Diet of Japan located in Ehime Prefecture.

== Areas covered ==
=== Since 2022 ===
- Iyo
- Ōzu
- Seiyo
- Uwajima
- Tōon
- Yawatahama
- Iyo District
- Kamiukena District
- Kita District
- Kitauwa District
- Minamiuwa District
- Nishiuwa District

== List of representatives ==
Election	Representative	Party	Notes
1996	Shinya Ono	LDP	
2000	Shinya Ono	LDP	
2003	Shinya Ono	LDP	
2005	Shinya Ono	LDP	
2009	Yoichi Shiraishi	Democratic	
2012	Tōru Shiraishi	LDP	
2014	Tōru Shiraishi	LDP	
2017	Yoichi Shiraishi	Kibō	
2017	Yoichi Shiraishi	DPP	
2017	Yoichi Shiraishi	CDP	
2021	Takumi Ihara	LDP	
2024	Junji Hasegawa	LDP	
2026	Junji Hasegawa	LDP	

== Election results ==
=== 2026 ===
2026
Party	Candidate	Votes	%	±%
LDP	Junji Hasegawa	119,930	71.18	▲9.1
Centrist Reform	Akihito Hagiwara	39,094	23.20	▼7.5
JCP	Naohito Nishii	9,462	5.62	▼1.6
Majority		80,836	47.98	
Registered electors		296,473		
Turnout			58.42	▲2.14
LDP hold				

=== 2024 ===
2024
Party	Candidate	Votes	%	±%
LDP	Junji Hasegawa	102,587	62.08	
CDP	Kiyosumi Ochi	50,702	30.68	
JCP	Naohito Nishii	11,963	7.24	N/A
Majority		51,885	31.40	
Registered electors		303,278		
Turnout			56.28	▼1.14
LDP hold				

=== 2021 ===
2021
Party	Candidate	Votes	%	±%
LDP	Takumi Ihara	76,263	51.58	
CDP	Yoichi Shiraishi (Won PR seat)	71,600	48.42	
Majority		4,663	3.16	
Registered electors		260,288		
Turnout			57.42	▲6.50
LDP gain from CDP				
