= Koichi Yamamoto =

Japanese politician (1947–2023)

Kōichi Yamamoto
- 山本 公一
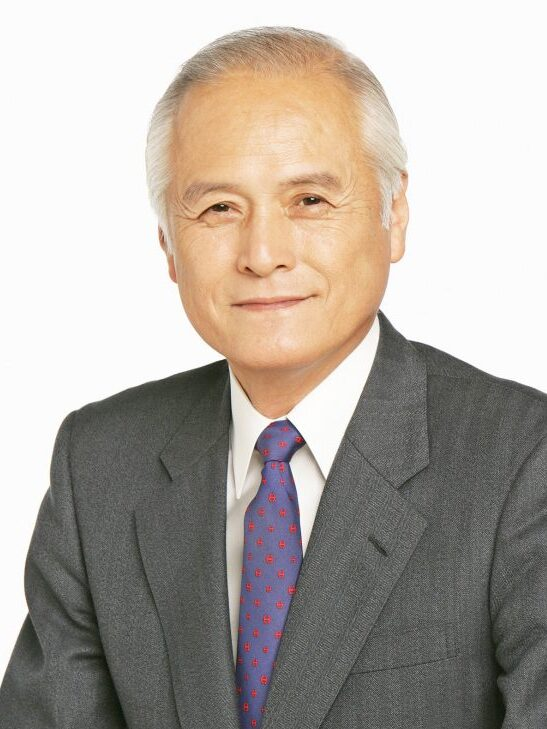
- Official portrait, 2016

Minister of Environment
- In office 3 August 2016 – 3 August 2017
- Prime Minister: Shinzo Abe
- Preceded by: Tamayo Marukawa
- Succeeded by: Masaharu Nakagawa

Vice Minister for Internal Affairs and Communications
- In office 29 September 2004 – 21 September 2005
- Prime Minister: Junichiro Koizumi
- Preceded by: Hiroshi Imai
- Succeeded by: Yoshihide Suga

Member of the House of Representatives
- In office 18 July 1993 – 14 October 2021
- Preceded by: Isamu Imai
- Succeeded by: Junji Hasegawa
- Constituency: Ehime 3rd (1993–1996); Ehime 4th (1996–2021)

Member of the Ehime Prefectural Assembly
- In office 30 April 1991 – 21 June 1993

Personal details
- Born: 4 September 1947 Uwajima, Ehime, Japan
- Died: 31 October 2023 (aged 76) Tokyo, Japan
- Party: Liberal Democratic
- Parent: Tomoichi Yamamoto (father)
- Education: Keio University

Koichi Yamamoto (山本 公一, Yamamoto Kōichi; 4 September 1947 – 31 October 2023) was a Japanese politician of the Liberal Democratic Party, a member of the House of Representatives in the Diet (national legislature).

== Background and profile ==
A native of Uwajima, Ehime and graduate of Keio University, Yamamoto was the son of Tomoichi Yamamoto, the mayor of Uwajima, and a member of the House of Representatives.

Yamamoto was elected to his one term in the assembly of Aichi Prefecture in 1991 and to the House of Representatives for the first time in 1993.

His profile on the LDP website:

- Member, Ehime Prefectural Assembly
- Parliamentary Vice-Minister of Environment(Hashimoto Cabinet)
- Senior Vice-Minister for Internal Affairs and Communications(Koizumi Cabinet)
- Deputy Chairman, General Council of LDP
- Director, Land, Infrastructure and Transport Division of LDP
- Chairman, Fundamental National Policies Committee of Diet

Koichi Yamamoto died on 31 October 2023, at the age of 76.

== Positions ==
Affiliated to the openly revisionist lobby Nippon Kaigi, Yamamoto gave the following answers to the questionnaire submitted by Mainichi to parliamentarians in 2012:

- in favor of the revision of the Constitution
- in favor of right of collective self-defense (revision of Article 9)
- in favor of reactivating nuclear power plants
- against the goal of zero nuclear power by 2030s
- in favor of the relocation of Marine Corps Air Station Futenma (Okinawa)
- in favor of evaluating the purchase of Senkaku Islands by the Government
- in favor of an attitude avoiding conflict with China
- against the participation of Japan to the Trans-Pacific Partnership
- against a nuclear-armed Japan
- no answer regarding the reform of the National assembly (unicameral instead of bicameral)
- no answer regarding the reform of the Imperial Household that would allow women to retain their Imperial status even after marriage

Political offices
Preceded by Tamayo Marukawa	Minister of the Environment; 2016–2017	Succeeded by Masaharu Nakagawa
