= Ehime 2nd district =

- Parliamentary constituency for the Japanese House of Representatives
- Numbered map of the Ehime Prefecture single seats
- Prefecture: Ehime
- Proportional District: Shikoku
- Electorate: 378,247

Current constituency
- Created: 1994
- Seats: One
- Party: LDP
- Representative: Takumi Ihara
- Municipalities: Imabari, Niihama, Saijō, Shikokuchūō, Ochi District.

Ehime 2nd district (愛媛県第2区, Ehime-ken dai-niku or simply 愛媛2区, Ehime-niku) is a single-member constituency of the House of Representatives in the national Diet of Japan located in Ehime Prefecture.

== Areas covered ==
=== Since 2022 ===
- Imabari
- Niihama
- Saijō
- Shikokuchūō
- Ochi District

== List of representatives ==
| Election | Representative | Party | Notes |
|---|---|---|---|
| 1996 | Seiichiro Murakami | LDP | |
| 2000 | Seiichiro Murakami | LDP | |
| 2003 | Seiichiro Murakami | LDP | |
| 2005 | Seiichiro Murakami | LDP | |
| 2009 | Seiichiro Murakami | LDP | |
| 2012 | Seiichiro Murakami | LDP | |
| 2014 | Seiichiro Murakami | LDP | |
| 2017 | Seiichiro Murakami | LDP | |
| 2021 | Seiichiro Murakami | LDP | |
| 2024 | Yoichi Shiraishi | CDP | |
| 2024 | Yoichi Shiraishi | CRA | |
| 2026 | Takumi Ihara | LDP | |

== Election results ==
=== 2026 ===
2026
| Party | Candidate | Votes | % | ±% |
|---|---|---|---|---|
| LDP | Takumi Ihara | 100,438 | 47.56 | ▲7.5 |
| Centrist Reform | Yoichi Shiraishi | 84,853 | 40.18 | ▼11.0 |
| Sanseitō | Shintarō Harada | 25,895 | 12.26 | New |
| Majority | | 15,585 | 7.38 | |
| Registered electors | | 375,644 | | |
| Turnout | | | 56.98 | ▲3.69 |
| LDP gain from Centrist Reform | | | | |

=== 2024 ===
2024
| Party | Candidate | Votes | % | ±% |
|---|---|---|---|---|
| CDP | Yoichi Shiraishi | 102,363 | 51.22 | New |
| LDP | Takumi Ihara | 80,056 | 40.06 | |
| Ishin | Kōsuke Kajino | 17,417 | 8.72 | New |
| Majority | | 22,307 | 11.16 | |
| Registered electors | | 382,124 | | |
| Turnout | | | 53.29 | ▲0.56 |
| CDP gain from LDP | | | | |

=== 2021 ===
2021
| Party | Candidate | Votes | % | ±% |
|---|---|---|---|---|
| LDP | Seiichiro Murakami | 72,861 | 57.49 | |
| DPP | Tomoe Ishii | 42,520 | 33.55 | New |
| JCP | Rō Kataoka | 11,358 | 8.96 | |
| Majority | | 30,341 | 23.94 | |
| Registered electors | | 249,121 | | |
| Turnout | | | 52.73 | ▲1.66 |
| LDP hold | | | | |
