= Keitaro Ohno =

Japanese politician (born 1968)

Keitarō Ohno
- 大野 敬太郎
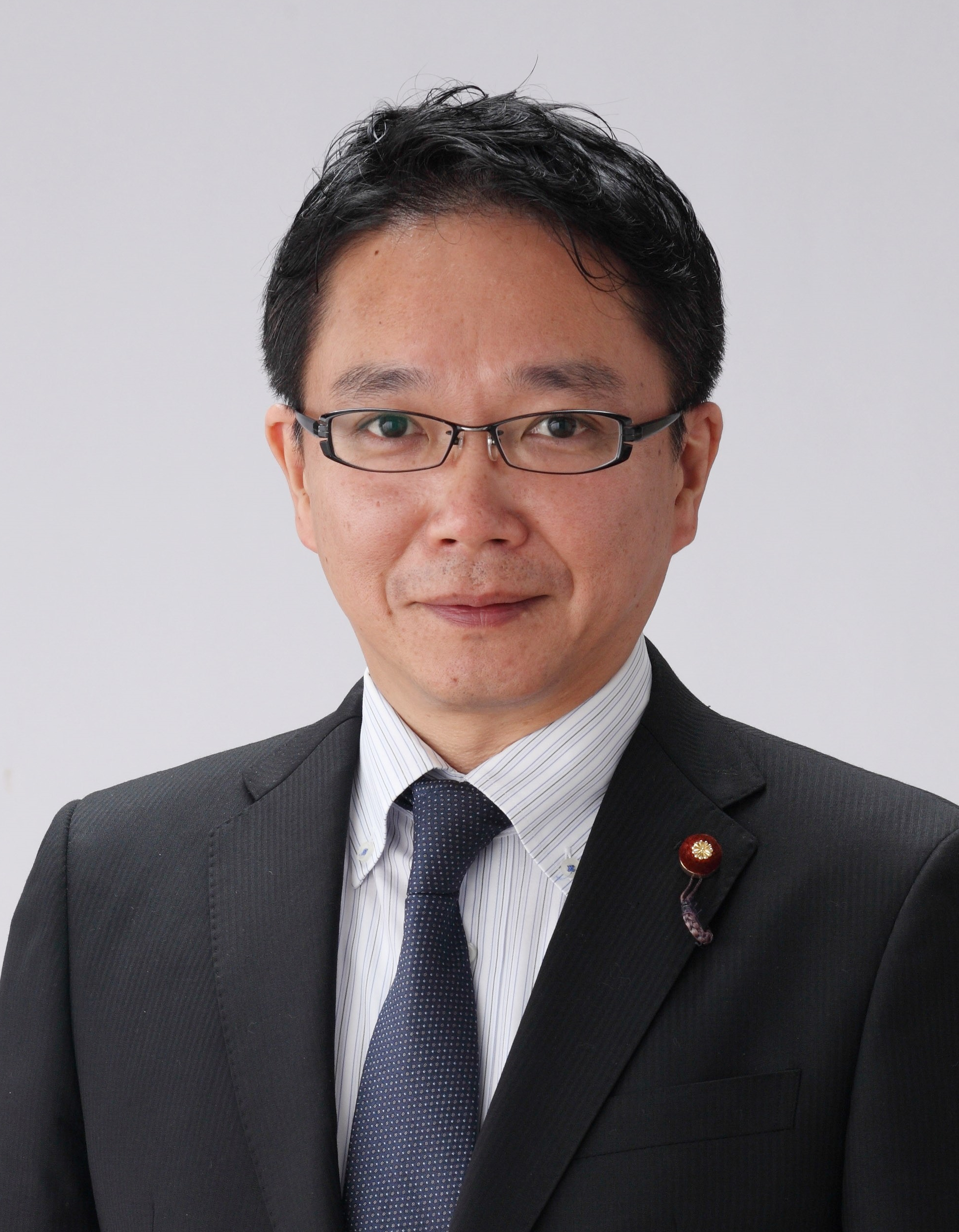
- Official portrait, 2021

Member of the House of Representatives
- Incumbent
- Assumed office 16 December 2012
- Preceded by: Yoshinori Ohno
- Constituency: Kagawa 3rd

Personal details
- Born: 1 November 1968 (age 57) Marugame, Kagawa, Japan
- Party: Liberal Democratic
- Parent: Yoshinori Ohno (father)
- Education: Tokyo Institute of Technology; Tokyo University; University of California at Berkeley

Keitarō Ohno (大野 敬太郎, Ōno Keitarō; born 1 November 1968) is a Japanese politician of the Liberal Democratic Party. He is currently serving as Deputy Secretary-General of the Liberal Democratic Party of Japan. He has served as State Minister of Cabinet Office in charge of Economic Security, Disaster Management, Space Policy, Science and Technology, etc, from 2021 to 2022, Parliamentary Vice Minister of Defense from 2017 to 2018, acting director of Foreign Policy Division and Deputy Chief Secretary of Security Research Committee from 2018 to 2019. He has been representing Kagawa 3rd district in the House of Representatives.

He started his career as an engineering researcher at Fujitsu Limited. He was with the Space Development Group, involved in research and design of several components on flight-model satellites, including ARH on ETS-VII, GLI on ADEOS-II, TIR on ASTER, XRS on ASTRO-E and LISM on SELENE. In 1999, he moved to its research institute, Fujitsu Laboratories and was working on the robust and optimal control for applications including HDDs, humanoid robot, GPS, spatial information system, etc. During this term, he was with the University of California at Berkeley as visiting fellow to continue to work on the fundamental research on control engineering.

== Political career ==
He started his political career as private secretary to the Minister of State for Defense in 2004 when his father was appointed to it by Prime Minister Junichiro Koizumi. He was in charge of supporting several issues including the revision of the National Defense Program Guideline, realignment of U.S. bases in Japan, and extending the activities of the Japanese Self Defense Forces in Iraq. He had been serving as a legislative assistant to his father until he run his own election. Other than the position in the diet, he was with the Department of Information Physics and Computing of the University of Tokyo, where he earned Ph.D. degree in 2007. In September 2012, he was elected Chairman of third District Branch of Kagawa Prefecture of LDP and was elected member of the House of Representatives in December 2012, at the 46th general election.

His interest includes national security policy, foreign policy, economic policy, science and technology policy, and education policy.
