= Yoichi Shiraishi =

Japanese politician

- 白石 洋一
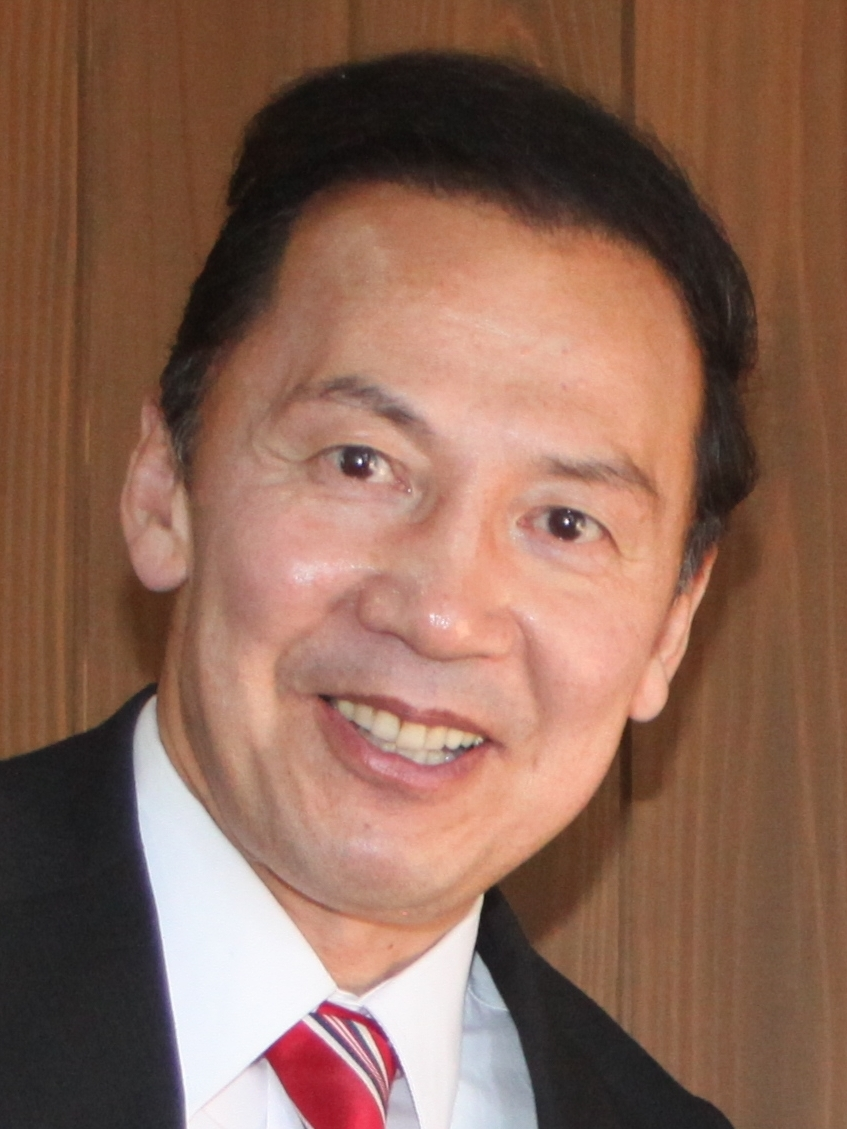
- Shiraishi in 2020

Member of the House of Representatives
- In office 22 October 2017 – 23 January 2026
- Preceded by: Tōru Shiraishi
- Succeeded by: Takumi Ihara
- Constituency: Ehime 3rd (2017–2021); Shikoku PR (2021–2024); Ehime 2nd (2024–2026)
- In office 30 August 2009 – 16 November 2012
- Preceded by: Shinya Ono
- Succeeded by: Tōru Shiraishi
- Constituency: Ehime 3rd

Personal details
- Born: 25 June 1963 (age 63) Fuse, Osaka, Japan
- Party: CRA (since 2026)
- Other political affiliations: DPJ (2007–2016); DP (2016–2017); KnT (2017–2018); DPP (2018–2020); CDP (2020–2026)
- Education: University of Tokyo; University of California, Berkeley

Yoichi Shiraishi is a Japanese politician who served as a member of the House of Representatives of Japan.

== Biography ==
Shiraishi was born in Fuse, the western part of present-day Higashiōsaka, Osaka Prefecture and grew up in Imabari, Ehime Prefecture.

After graduating from the Faculty of Law at University of Tokyo, he joined the Long-Term Credit Bank of Japan. In 1993, he received an MBA from the Graduate School of Business Administration at University of California, Berkeley. In 1997, he was transferred to the New York branch of the Long-Term Credit Bank of Japan, but due to the collapse of the Long-Term Credit Bank of Japan, he moved to the KPMG New York office.

In February 2007, Yoichi Shiraishi was nominated by Democratic Party of Japan (DPJ) as a candidate for Ehime 3rd district and began campaigning for the election. Meanwhile, ruling Liberal Democratic Party (LDP) officially nominated Toru Shiraishi as its candidate after Shinya Ono's retirement.

In 2009 general election, Yoichi Shiraishi won Ehime 3rd seat by defeating Toru Shiraishi, LDP candidate, in the national wind toward DPJ.

In 2012 general election, Yoichi Shiraishi lost his seat to Toru Shiraishi due to headwinds toward DPJ.

In 2014 general election, he beat Toru Shiraishi in Saijō, where he was based, but lost in other areas and lost again to Toru Shiraishi.

He was first elected in 2014.
