= Masayasu Yamasaki =

Japanese politician

- 山崎 正恭

Member of the House of Representatives
- Incumbent
- Assumed office 1 November 2021
- Preceded by: Noritoshi Ishida
- Constituency: Shikoku PR

Member of the Kōchi Prefectural Assembly
- In office 2019 – 31 August 2021
- Constituency: Kōchi city

Personal details
- Born: 5 March 1971 (age 55) Kōchi city, Kōchi Prefecture, Japan
- Party: Komeito (until 2026; since 2026)
- Other political affiliations: CRA (2026)
- Education: Chukyo University; Naruto University of Education
- Website: Masayasu Yamasaki website

Masayasu Yamasaki (山崎 正恭, Yamasaki Masayasu; born 5 March 1971) is a Japanese politician of the Centrist Reform Alliance, who serves as a member of the House of Representatives.

== Early years ==
Yamasaki was born in Kōchi, Kōchi Prefecture. After graduating from Chukyo University in March 1993, he worked as a junior high school teacher in Kōchi Prefecture. In 2010, he completed his graduate studies at Naruto University of Education.

== Political career ==
In 2019, Yamasaki ran for the Kōchi Prefectural Assembly as a Komeito candidate and won.

In September 2020, Komeito announced Yamasaki would run in Shikoku PR in next general election as Noritoshi Ishida's successor.

On 31 August 2021, Yamasaki resigned as a member of the Kōchi Prefectural Assembly.

In the 2021 general election, Yamasaki won a seat in the PR.

In the 2024 general election, Yamasaki won a seat in the PR block.

In January 2026, CDP and Komeito merged into Centrist Reform Alliance (CRA). Yamasaki joined CRA.

In the 2026 general election, Yamasaki run as a CRA candidate and won a seat in the PR.
