= Junji Hasegawa =

Japanese politician

- 長谷川 淳二
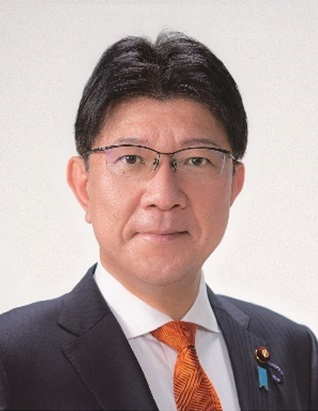
- Official portrait, 2024

Member of the House of Representatives
- Incumbent
- Assumed office 1 November 2021
- Preceded by: Koichi Yamamoto
- Constituency: Ehime 4th (2021–2024); Ehime 3rd (2024-present)

Personal details
- Born: 5 August 1968 (age 58) Hichisō, Kamo District, Gifu Prefecture, Japan
- Party: LDP
- Education: University of Tokyo
- Website: Junji Hasegawa website

Junji Hasegawa (長谷川 淳二, Hasegawa Junji; born 5 August 1968) is a Japanese politician of the Liberal Democratic Party, who serves as a member of the House of Representatives.

== Early years ==
Hasegawa was born in Hichisō, Kamo District, Gifu Prefecture.

After graduating from the Faculty of Law at the University of Tokyo, he joined the Ministry of Home Affairs (current Ministry of Internal Affairs and Communications) in 1991.

Starting in 2008, Hasegawa was seconded to the Ehime Prefectural Government, where he served as the Director-General of the General Affairs Department before serving as the Vice Governor of Ehime Prefecture for three years starting in 2012. He returned to the Ministry of Internal Affairs and Communications in 2015. During the July 2018 West Japan heavy rain disaster, he was deployed to the field in Uwajima, where he took command of the disaster response efforts.

== Political career ==
In September 2019, Koichi Yamamoto, the Ehime 4th incumbent and former Minister of the Environment, announced that he would not run in the next general election and would retire from politics. In December, when the LDP launched an open recruitment process to select Yamamoto's successor, the LDP local branch endorsed Hasegawa, citing his handling of the July 2018 West Japan heavy rain disaster. Hasegawa resigned from the Ministry for Internal Affairs and Communications on December 25 and relocated from Yokohama, where he was living at the time, to Uwajima. On January 8, 2020, Hasegawa officially declared his candidacy.

In the 2021 general election, Hasegawa won Ehime 4th's seat.

Due to the redistricting that reduced Ehime Prefecture's seats from four to three, he was appointed as the head of the new Ehime 3rd district (effectively the designated candidate) on December 23, 2022.

On December 27, Hasegawa was appointed to the Parliamentary Vice-Minister for Internal Affairs and Communications because of Mio Sugita's resignation over past discriminatory remarks.

In September 2023, Hasegawa was re-appointed to Parliamentary Vice-Minister for Internal Affairs and Communications in Second Kishida second reshuffled cabinet.

In the 2024 LDP presidential election, Hasegawa endorsed Shinjirō Koizumi as a recommender. He voted for Koizumi in first round and voted for Shigeru Ishiba in run-off.

In October 2024, Hasegawa was re-appointed to Parliamentary Vice-Minister for Internal Affairs and Communications in First Ishiba cabinet.

In the 2024 general election, Hasegawa run in Ehime 3rd and won the seat.

In the 2026 general election, Hasegawa was re-elected.
