= Seiichiro Murakami =

Japanese politician

- 村上 誠一郎
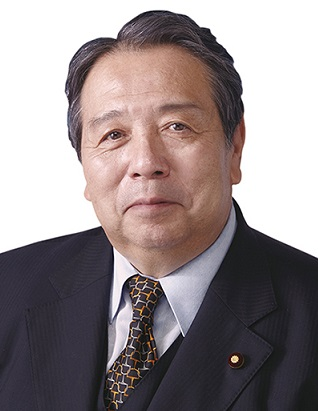
- Official portrait, 2024

Minister for Internal Affairs and Communications
- In office 1 October 2024 – 21 October 2025
- Prime Minister: Shigeru Ishiba
- Preceded by: Takeaki Matsumoto
- Succeeded by: Yoshimasa Hayashi

Minister for Administrative Reform Minister of State for Regulatory Reform
- In office 27 September 2004 – 31 October 2005
- Prime Minister: Junichiro Koizumi
- Preceded by: Kazuyoshi Kaneko
- Succeeded by: Kōki Chūma

Member of the House of Representatives
- Incumbent
- Assumed office 6 July 1986
- Preceded by: Takatoshi Fujita
- Constituency: Former Ehime 2nd (1986–1996); Ehime 2nd (1996–2024); Shikoku PR (2024–present)

Personal details
- Born: 11 May 1952 (age 74) Ochi, Ehime, Japan
- Party: Liberal Democratic
- Education: Tokyo University

Seiichiro Murakami (村上 誠一郎, Murakami Seiichirō; born 11 May 1952) is a Japanese politician. He was the Minister of State for Regulatory Reform, the Minister of State for Industrial Revitalization Corporation of Japan, the Minister of State for Administrative Reform, the Minister of State for Special Zones for Structural Reform and the Minister of State for Regional Revitalization in Japanese Prime Minister Junichiro Koizumi's Cabinet.

He received his Bachelor of Arts degree in Law from Tokyo University, and was first elected in 1986 to the House of Representatives in Ehime Prefecture.

== Election history ==
Election	Age	District	Political party	Number of votes	election results
1983 Japanese general election	31	Ehime 2nd district	Independent	51,423	lost
1986 Japanese general election	34	Ehime 2nd district	LDP	79,171	winning
1990 Japanese general election	37	Ehime 2nd district	LDP	64,084	winning
1993 Japanese general election	41	Ehime 2nd district	LDP	72,924	winning
1996 Japanese general election	44	Ehime 2nd district	LDP	118,966	winning
2000 Japanese general election	48	Ehime 2nd district	LDP	113,616	winning
2003 Japanese general election	51	Ehime 2nd district	LDP	99,208	winning
2005 Japanese general election	53	Ehime 2nd district	LDP	115,297	winning
2009 Japanese general election	57	Ehime 2nd district	LDP	94,843	winning
2012 Japanese general election	60	Ehime 2nd district	LDP	77,078	winning
2014 Japanese general election	62	Ehime 2nd district	LDP	57,168	winning
2017 Japanese general election	65	Ehime 2nd district	LDP	62,516	winning
2021 Japanese general election	69	Ehime 2nd district	LDP	72,861	winning
2024 Japanese general election	72	Shikoku proportional representation block	LDP	−−	winning
2026 Japanese general election	73	Shikoku proportional representation block	LDP	−−	winning

Preceded by Takeaki Matsumoto	Minister for Internal Affairs and Communications; 2024–present	Incumbent
