= Kagawa 1st district =

Kagawa's 1st House of representatives single member district

Kagawa 1st District
- 香川県第1区
- Parliamentary constituency for the Japanese House of Representatives
- Prefecture: Kagawa
- Proportional District: Shikoku
- Electorate: 312,992 (as of September 2022)

Current constituency
- Created: 1994
- Seats: One
- Party: CRA
- Representative: Junya Ogawa

Kagawa 1st district (香川県第1区, Kagawa-ken dai-i-ku) is an electoral district in the House of Representatives of Japan. The district was established in 1994 as a single-member constituency.

The current representative for the district is Junya Ogawa, a member of the CDP as well as former representative for the district from 2009 to 2012 as a member of the DPJ. Ogawa was previously a member of the Shikoku proportional representation district from 2005 to 2009, and then again from 2012 to 2021.

== Areas covered ==
=== Current district ===
After the rezoning applied in 2022, the areas covered by this district are as follows:

- Takamatsu (city limits before the Great Heisei Consolidation)
  - City Centre
  - Busshozan and Katsuga
  - former town of Yamada
  - districts of Mokuta, Furutakamatsu, Yashima, Maeda, Kawazoe, Enji and Danshi
  - Islands of Megijima and Ogijima
- Shōzu District
- Kagawa District

=== Areas 2017–2022 ===
After the 2017 redistricting, the areas covered by this district were as follows:

- Takamatsu (city limits before the Great Heisei Consolidation)
  - City Centre
  - Katsuga
  - former town of Yamada
  - districts of Tsuruo, Ota, Mokuta, Busshozan, Furutakamatsu, Yashima, Maeda, Kawazoe, Enji, Hayashi, Mitani, Ichinomiya, Tahi and Danshi
  - Islands of Megijima and Ogijima
- Shōzu District
- Kagawa District

=== Areas 2013–2017 ===
After the 2013 redistricting, the areas covered by the district were as follows:

- Takamatsu (city limits before the Great Heisei Consolidation)
  - City Centre
  - Katsuga
  - former town of Yamada
  - districts of Tsuruo, Ota, Mokuta, Busshozan, Furutakamatsu, Yashima, Tsuruchi, Kosai, Kinashi, Shimokasai, Maeda, Kawazoe, Enji, Hayashi, Mitani, Ichinomiya, Tahi and Danshi
  - Islands of Megijima and Ogijima
- Shōzu District
- Kagawa District

=== Areas from before 2013 ===
From 1994 to the first rezoning in 2013, the areas covered by the district were as follows:

- Takamatsu
- Shōzu District
- Kagawa District
  - Naoshima

== Elected representatives ==
Representatives	Party	Years served	Notes
Takao Fujimoto	LDP	1996-2000	
Takuya Hirai	Indep.	2000-2003	
Takuya Hirai	LDP	2003-2009	
Junya Ogawa	DPJ	2009-2012	
Takuya Hirai	LDP	2012-2021	
Junya Ogawa	CDP	2021-2026	
Junya Ogawa	CRA	2026-	

== Election results ==
‡ - Also ran in Shikoku PR district

‡‡ - Ran and won in the Shikoku PR district

2026
Party	Candidate	Votes	%	±%
Centrist Reform	Junya Ogawa^{‡}	73,237	43.0	▼8.3
LDP	Takuya Hirai^{‡‡}	72,408	42.6	▲10.4
Sanseitō	Kazuki Michikawa	19,364	11.4	▲5.7
JCP	Masaki Nagao	5,133	3.0	▼0.5
Registered electors		307,716		
Turnout		170,142	56.64	▲3.34
Centrist Reform hold				

2024
Party	Candidate	Votes	%	±%
CDP	Junya Ogawa	82,549	51.33	▲0.33
LDP	Takuya Hirai^{‡‡} (PR incumbent) (endorsed by Komeito)	51,727	32.16	▼7.86
Ishin	Junko Machikawa	11,730	7.29	▼1.69
Sanseitō	Naomi Kobayashi	9,176	5.71	
JCP	Kenichi Tanabe	5,646	3.51	
Turnout		160,828	53.21	▼4.31
CDP hold				

2021
Party	Candidate	Votes	%	±%
CDP	Junya Ogawa^{‡} (incumbent - Shikoku PR)	90,267	51.0	New
LDP	Takuya Hirai^{‡‡} (incumbent) (endorsed by Komeito)	70,287	40.0	▼10.7
Ishin	Junko Machikawa	15,888	9.0	New
Turnout		180,208	57.5	▲4.6
CDP gain from LDP		Swing	N/A	

2017
Party	Candidate	Votes	%	±%
LDP	Takuya Hirai^{‡} (incumbent) (endorsed by Komeito)	81,566	50.7	▲1.2
Kibō no Tō	Junya Ogawa^{‡‡} (incumbent - Shikoku PR) (endorsed by the Democratic Party's Kanagawa Branch Federation)	79,383	49.3	New
Turnout		166,076	52.9	
LDP hold		Swing	▲1.4	

2014
Party	Candidate	Votes	%	±%
LDP	Takuya Hirai^{‡} (incumbent) (endorsed by Komeito)	74,115	49.5	▲1.6
Democratic	Junya Ogawa^{‡‡} (incumbent - Shikoku PR)	65,810	44.0	▲8.3
JCP	Tadashi Kawamura	9,823	6.6	▲1.9
Turnout				
LDP hold		Swing	▲3.0	

2012
Party	Candidate	Votes	%	±%
LDP	Takuya Hirai^{‡} (incumbent - Shikoku PR) (endorsed by Komeito)	84,080	47.9	▲4.3
Democratic	Junya Ogawa^{‡‡} (incumbent) (endorsed by the PNP)	63,114	35.9	▼16.4
Ishin	Eiji Imanishi^{‡}	20,143	11.5	New
JCP	Tadashi Kawamura	8,260	4.7	▲1.7
Turnout				
LDP gain from Democratic		Swing	▲5.8	

2009
Party	Candidate	Votes	%	±%
Democratic	Junya Ogawa^{‡} (incumbent - Shikoku PR)	109,618	52.3	▲7.3
LDP	Takuya Hirai^{‡‡} (incumbent)	91,403	43.6	▼7.3
JCP	Tadashi Kawamura	6,378	3.0	▼1.1
Happiness Realization	Kumiko Shiraishi	2,416	2.2	New
Turnout				
Democratic gain from LDP		Swing	▲6.6	

2005
Party	Candidate	Votes	%	±%
LDP	Takuya Hirai^{‡} (incumbent)	103,592	50.9	▲1.7
Democratic	Junya Ogawa^{‡‡}	91,461	45.0	▲5.9
JCP	Akio Matsubara	8,432	4.1	▲0.5
Turnout				
LDP hold		Swing	▲9.0	

2003
Party	Candidate	Votes	%	±%
LDP	Takuya Hirai^{‡} (incumbent)	79,298	49.2	▲16.2
Democratic	Junya Ogawa^{‡}	62,939	39.1	New
Social Democratic	Shigeaki Kato^{‡}	12,280	7.6	▼7.2
JCP	Akikatsu Ishikawa	5,764	3.6	▼3.1
Independent	Kenji Onishi	910	0.6	New
Turnout				
LDP gain from Independent		Swing	▲9.8	

2000
Party	Candidate	Votes	%	±%
Independent	Takuya Hirai	85,578	45.5	New
LDP	Takao Fujimoto^{‡} (incumbent)	62,065	33.0	▲3.3
Social Democratic	Shigeaki Kato^{‡}	27,733	14.8	▲7.3
JCP	Akio Matsubara	12,667	6.7	▲1.0
Turnout				
Independent gain from LDP		Swing	N/A	

1996
Party	Candidate	Votes	%	±%
LDP	Takao Fujimoto^{‡} (incumbent - Kanagwa 1st)	62,612	36.3	New
New Frontier	Takuya Hirai	55,578	32.2	New
Democratic	Mitsuhiro Manabe^{‡}	31,501	18.3	New
Social Democratic	Shigeaki Kato^{‡}	12,964	7.5	New
JCP	Tadashi Kawamura	9,737	5.7	New
Turnout		190,242	65.1	
LDP win (new seat)				
