= Tokushima 1st district =

Legislative district of Japan

- Parliamentary constituency for the House of Representatives
- Numbered map of Tokushima Prefecture single-member districts
- Proportional District: Shikoku
- Electorate: 360,095 (as of September 1, 2022)

Current constituency
- Created: 1994
- Number of members: 1
- Party: LDP
- Representative: Hirobumi Niki

Tokushima 1st district (徳島県第1区) is a constituency of the House of Representatives in the Diet of Japan, located in Tokushima Prefecture on the island of Shikoku.

The district was created in the electoral reform of 1994. Previously, all of Tokushima prefecture had formed one SNTV multi-member constituency (five representatives) since 1947. The new district was used in the 1996 election for the first time.

Liberal Democrat Mamoru Fukuyama, former six-term member and president of the Tokushima prefectural assembly and secretary-general of the LDP prefectural federation, defeated Democrat Yoshito Sengoku in the 2012 Representatives election by almost 20,000 votes. Sengoku, a candidate for the Democratic Party of Japan (DPJ) and its 1996 precursor had won the district five times after its creation. Sengoku, a lawyer and University of Tokyo drop-out, had previously represented the Tokushima At-large district between 1990 and 1993 for the Socialist Party of Japan.

Before redistricting in 2013, the district consisted of Tokushima city and the village of Sanagōchi in the Myōdō District and was among the least populated electoral districts in Japan. In the election of 2005 it had 214,763 constituents and its voters had the highest electoral weight throughout Japan.

== Area ==
- Tokushima city
- Komatsushima
- Anan
- Katsuura District
- Myōdō District
- Myōzai District
- Naka District
- Kaifu District

== List of representatives ==
Representative	Party	Dates	Notes
Yoshito Sengoku	DPJ	1996 – 2012	Failed reelection to a proportional seat in the Shikoku block (sekihairitsu 66.5%, rank 3)
Mamoru Fukuyama	LDP	2012 – 2014	
Masazumi Gotoda	LDP	2014 – 2021	Elected to a proportional seat in the Shikoku block. Elected Governor of Tokushima Prefecture in 2023.
Hirobumi Niki	Independent	2021 – 2024	Member of the Diet for the DPJ 2009 – 2012. Member of Yūshi no Kai 2021 – 2023 then joined the LDP.
Hirobumi Niki	LDP	2024 –	Member of the Diet for the DPJ 2009 – 2012. Member of Yūshi no Kai 2021 – 2023 then joined the LDP.

== Election results ==
2026
Party	Candidate	Votes	%	±%
LDP	Hirobumi Niki	107,440	58.2	▲8.3
Centrist Reform	Ei Takahashi	46,960	25.4	▼6.6
Ishin	Tomoyo Yoshida	16,040	8.7	▼2.1
Sanseitō	Chiharu Kamei	14,154	7.7	
Registered electors		345,096		
Turnout			54.43	▲4.37
LDP hold				

2024
Party	Candidate	Votes	%	±%
LDP	Hirobumi Niki	85,386	49.9	
CDP	Ei Takahashi (elected by PR)	54,839	32.0	
Ishin	Tomoyo Yoshida	20,270	11.8	
JCP	Takayuki Kubo	8,454	4.9	
Independent	Yukitoshi Satō	2,318	1.3	
Registered electors		350,661		
Turnout			50.06	▼5.87
LDP hold				

2021
Party	Candidate	Votes	%	±%
Independent	Hirobumi Niki	99,474	50.05	New
LDP	Masazumi Gotoda (elected in PR)	77,398	38.94	▼12.55
Ishin	Tomoyo Yoshida (elected in PR)	20,065	10.10	New
Turnout			55.93	
Independent gain from LDP				

2017
Party	Candidate	Votes	%	±%
LDP	Masazumi Gotoda	90,281	51.49	▼0.54
Kibō no Tō	Hirobumi Niki	69,442	39.60	▲0.60
JCP	Chiyoko Yamamoto	15,622	8.91	▲0.00
Turnout			47.98	
LDP hold				

2014
Party	Candidate	Votes	%	±%
LDP	Masazumi Gotoda	92,166	52.03	▼1.17
Democratic	Hirobumi Niki	69,188	39.06	▲3.66
JCP	Motonori Furuta	15.776	8.91	▼2.49
Turnout			48.94	
LDP hold				

2012
Party	Candidate	Votes	%	±%
LDP (NK)	Mamoru Fukuyama	59,231	53.2	
DPJ (PNP)	Yoshito Sengoku	39,402	35.4	
JCP	Motonori Furuta	12,724	11.4	

2009
Party	Candidate	Votes	%	±%
DPJ (PNP support)	Yoshito Sengoku	76,764	56.23	
LDP (Kōmeitō support)	Yoshirō Okamoto	39,780	29.14	
Independent (Hiranuma group)	Yūki Oka	10,275	7.53	
JCP	Motonori Furuta	8,313	6.09	
HRP	Akira Kondō	1,395	1.02	
Turnout		138,535	64.63	

2005
Party	Candidate	Votes	%	±%
DPJ	Yoshito Sengoku	68,026	50.57	
LDP	Yoshirō Okamoto	54,843	40.77	
JCP	Hideaki Kamimura	9,767	7.26	
Turnout		134,521	62.79	

2003
Party	Candidate	Votes	%	±%
DPJ	Yoshito Sengoku	60,917	52.09	
LDP	Akira Shichijō	44,892	38.39	
JCP	Chiyoko Yamamoto	9,767	8.35	
Turnout		116,949	54.73	

2000
Party	Candidate	Votes	%	±%
DPJ	Yoshito Sengoku	60,945	47.32	
LDP	Yoshirō Okamoto	41,628	32.32	
JCP	Hideaki Kamimura	14,164	11.00	
Independent	Hiromi Ōta	12,068	9.37	
Turnout		128,802	59.1	

1996
Party	Candidate	Votes	%	±%
DPJ	Yoshito Sengoku	47,057	37.73	
LDP	Toshiji Miki	41,133	32.98	
NFP	Hiromi Ōta	23,684	18.99	
JCP	Hideaki Kamimura	11,092	8.89	
Independent	Masahiro Kanemaru	1,739	1.39	
Turnout		124,705		
