= Mamoru Fukuyama =

Japanese politician

- 福山 守
- Official portrait, 2025

Senator of Japan
- Incumbent
- Assumed office 29 July 2025
- Constituency: National PR

Member of the House of Representatives
- In office 17 December 2012 – 14 October 2021
- Preceded by: Yoshito Sengoku
- Succeeded by: Multi-member district
- Constituency: Tokushima 1st (2012–2014); Shikoku PR (2014–2021)

Member of the Tokushima Prefectural Assembly
- In office 1991–2012
- Constituency: Tokushima City

Member of the Tokushima City Council
- In office 1987–1991

Personal details
- Born: 19 December 1952 (age 73) Tokushima, Tokushima Prefecture, Japan
- Party: Liberal Democratic
- Education: Azabu Veterinary College

Mamoru Fukuyama (福山 守, Fukuyama Mamoru; born 19 December 1952) is a Japanese politician of the Liberal Democratic Party, who serves as a member of the Senate.

== Early years ==
In 1952, Fukuyama was born in Tokushima, Tokushima Prefecture. He graduated from Azabu Veterinary College.

== Political career ==
In 1987, Fukuyama ran for the Tokushima City Council and won.

In 1991, Fukuyama ran for the Tokushima Prefecture Assembly and won.

Fukuyama resigned as a member of the Tokushima Prefectural Assembly and ran for Tokushima 1st district in the 2012 general election. As a result, he defeated DPJ Incumbent Yoshito Sengoku, former Chief Cabinet Secretary, and gained Tokushima 1st's seat.

On 15 July 2014, due to the reduction in the number of seats in the House of Representatives, Tokushima’s single-seat constituencies were cut from three to two, and a portion of the former Tokushima 3rd district was incorporated into Tokushima 1st district. Fukuyama yielded the seat to Masazumi Gotoda, Tokushima 3rd incumbent, and instead would ran in Shikoku PR in next general election.

In September 2014, Fukuyama was appointed to Parliamentary Vice-Minister for the Environment in the Second Abe reshuffled cabinet.

In the 2014 general election, Fukuyama won a seat in the PR block. After the election, he was re-appointed to Minister for the Environment, and Parliamentary Vice-Minister of Cabinet Office in the Third Abe cabinet.

In September 2015, Fukuyama participated in the formation of Suigetsukai, the faction that would later be known as the Ishiba Faction. Gotoda also joined the faction.

In the 2017 general election, Fukuyama won a seat in the PR block.

In the 2018 LDP presidential election, Fukuyama endorsed Shigeru Ishiba as a recommender.

By 2020, Fukuyama began exploring a run for the Tokushima 1st district, leading to a confrontation with Gotoda, a fellow Ishiba Faction member and Tokushima 1st's incumbent. During the 2020 Tokushima mayoral election, the two were on opposite sides: while Gotoda supported the incumbent Akiyoshi Endo, Fukuyama — alongside Shunichi Yamaguchi (incumbent of the Tokushima 2nd district) — backed newcomer and civic group leader Sawako Naito. Naito defeated Endo by a narrow margin to win her first term. At 36 years old, Naito garnered significant media attention as the "youngest female mayor in the country."

In the 2020 LDP presidential election, Fukuyama endorsed Ishiba as a recommender again.

In the 2021 general election, Fukuyama ultimately failed to won a seat after being placed low on the party's proportional representation list.

In the 2023 Tokushima mayoral election, while incumbent Naito announced she would not seek re-election, former mayor Endo who had lost to Naito by a narrow margin in the last mayoral election declared his candidacy. Amidst these developments, Fukuyama also announced his bid for the mayorship. When the votes were counted, Fukuyama was defeated by Endo.

In the 2025 House of Councillors election, Fukuyama won a seat in the national PR.

In November 2025, Fukuyama was appointed to Parliamentary Secretary for Justice in the First Takaichi cabinet.

In February 2026, Fukuyama was re-appointed to Parliamentary Secretary for Justice in the Second Takaichi cabinet.
