= Yoshito Sengoku =

Japanese politician (1946–2018)

- 仙谷 由人
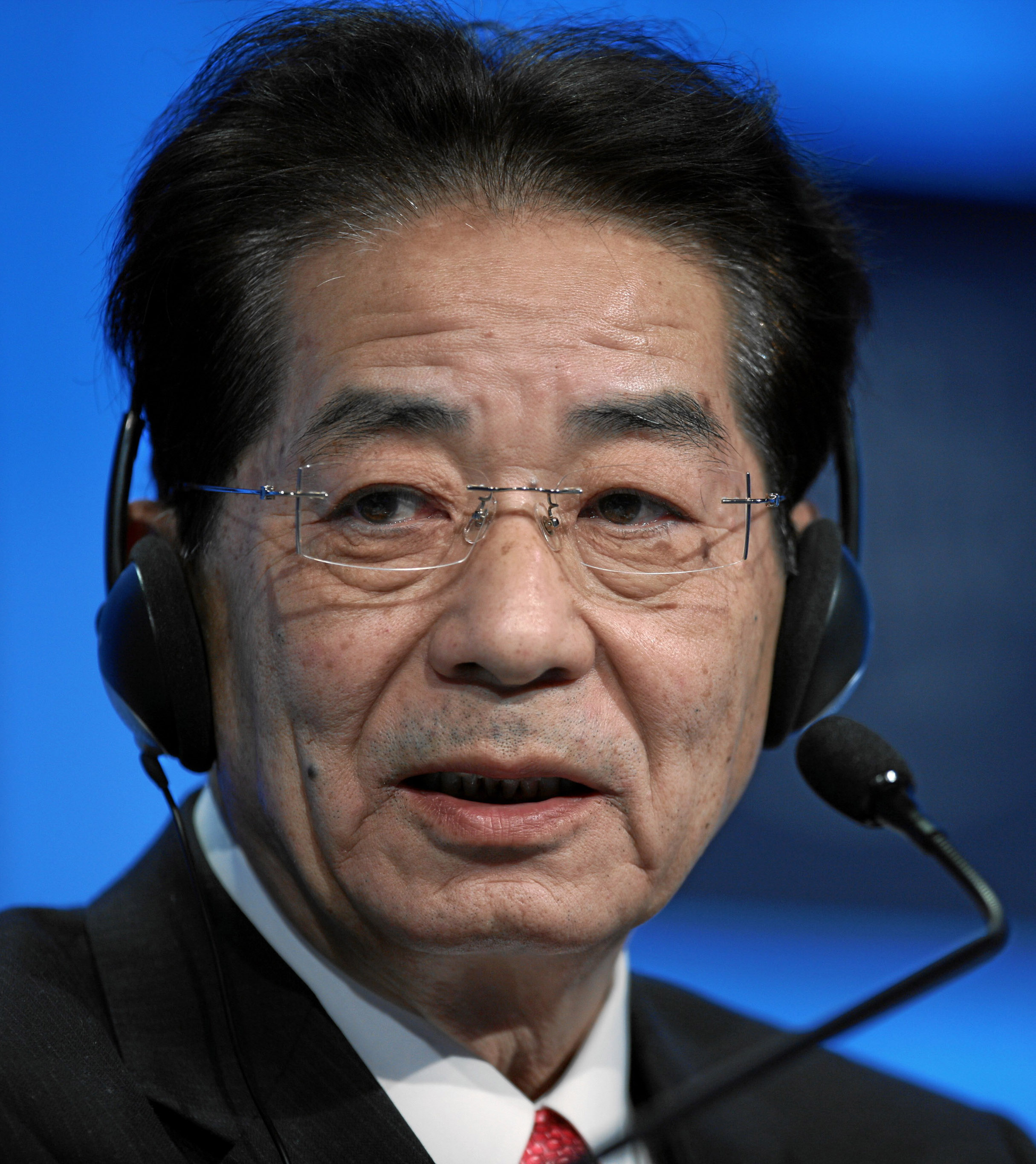
- Sengoku at the 2010 World Economic Forum

Deputy Chief Cabinet Secretary (Political affairs, House of Representatives)
- In office 17 March 2011 – 2 September 2011
- Prime Minister: Naoto Kan
- Preceded by: Hirohisa Fujii
- Succeeded by: Tsuyoshi Saitō

Minister of Justice
- In office 22 November 2010 – 14 January 2011
- Prime Minister: Naoto Kan
- Preceded by: Minoru Yanagida
- Succeeded by: Satsuki Eda

Minister of State for the Abduction Issue
- In office 22 November 2010 – 14 January 2011
- Prime Minister: Naoto Kan
- Preceded by: Minoru Yanagida
- Succeeded by: Kansei Nakano

Chief Cabinet Secretary
- In office 8 June 2010 – 14 January 2011
- Prime Minister: Naoto Kan
- Preceded by: Hirofumi Hirano
- Succeeded by: Yukio Edano

Minister of State for National Strategy
- In office 7 January 2010 – 8 June 2010
- Prime Minister: Yukio Hatoyama
- Preceded by: Naoto Kan
- Succeeded by: Satoshi Arai

Minister of State for Civil Service Reform
- In office 16 September 2009 – 8 June 2010
- Prime Minister: Yukio Hatoyama
- Preceded by: Office established
- Succeeded by: Kōichirō Genba

Minister of State for Government Revitalisation
- In office 16 September 2009 – 10 February 2010
- Prime Minister: Yukio Hatoyama
- Preceded by: Office established
- Succeeded by: Yukio Edano

Member of the House of Representatives
- In office 20 October 1996 – 4 December 2012
- Preceded by: Constituency established
- Succeeded by: Mamoru Fukuyama
- Constituency: Tokushima 1st
- In office 18 February 1990 – 18 June 1993
- Preceded by: Motoharu Morishita
- Succeeded by: Yoshihito Iwasa
- Constituency: Tokushima at-large

Personal details
- Born: 15 January 1946 Tokushima, Japan
- Died: 11 October 2018 (aged 72) Tokyo, Japan
- Party: Democratic (1998–2016)
- Other political affiliations: JSP (1990–1996); SDP (1996); DP 1996 (1996–1998); DP 1998 (2016–2018)
- Education: University of Tokyo (Incomplete)
- Website: Official website

Yoshito Sengoku (仙谷 由人, Sengoku Yoshito; 15 January 1946 – 11 October 2018) was a Japanese politician serving in the House of Representatives in the Diet (national legislature) as a member of the Democratic Party of Japan.

== Overviews ==
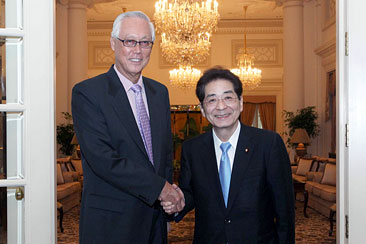
Sengoku with Goh Chok Tong in 2012

He was born in Tokushima, Tokushima prefecture. While studying in the University of Tokyo, he passed the bar exam and therefore dropped out of the university. He was elected for the first time in 1990 as a member of the Japan Socialist Party.

Viewed as a close ally of Prime Minister Naoto Kan, the opposition Liberal Democratic Party has labeled Sengoku as the "second" Prime Minister of the Kan cabinet. Sengoku denies that he wields any extraordinary influence in the government and praised Kan as a "strong leader".

In January 2011, he was ousted from his position as a top cabinet member due to swelling pressure from the opposition, namely the Liberal Democratic Party and Komeito Party, to execute cabinet reform. Sengoku was replaced by Yukio Edano, who was expected to yield much influence over Kan as a protégé of Sengoku.

In March 2011, Prime Minister Naoto Kan appointed Sengoku as Deputy Chief Cabinet Secretary.

He lost his seat in the 16 December 2012 general election.

== Bibliography ==
Creating Imaginative Politics (創造的政治をつくる). Gendai Rironsha, December 5, 1992.

Takagi, Kenichi; Sengoku, Yoshito (1993). Hong Kong Military Notes and Postwar Compensation (香港軍票と戦後補償). Akashi Shoten. ISBN 4750305332.

Urgent: The Transformation of Japan as a Construction Nation (緊急提言 建設国家日本の変革). Goma Shobo, November 1999. ISBN 4341171925.

House of Representatives (Japan)
Preceded by Masaharu Gotōda; Takeo Miki; Kazuyoshi Endō; Motoharu Morishita; Hironori Inoue	Representative for Tokushima's at-large district (multi-member); 1990–1993; Served alongside: Masaharu Gotōda, Shunichi Yamaguchi, Kazuyoshi Endō, Hironori Inoue	Succeeded by Masaharu Gotōda; Shunichi Yamaguchi; Kazuyoshi Endō; Yoshihito Iwasa; Akira Shichijō
New constituency	Representative for Tokushima's 1st district 1990-1993, 1996–2012	Succeeded by Mamoru Fukuyama
Party political offices
Preceded by Yukio Edano	Chairperson of the Policy Affairs Research Council of the Democratic Party; 2004–2005	Succeeded by Takeaki Matsumoto
Political offices
New office	Minister of State for Civil Service Reform; 2009–2010	Succeeded by Kōichirō Genba
New office	Minister of State for Government Revitalization; 2009–2010	Succeeded by Yukio Edano
Preceded by Naoto Kan	Minister of State for National Strategy; 2010	Succeeded by Satoshi Arai
Preceded by Hirofumi Hirano	Chief Cabinet Secretary; 2010–2011	Succeeded by Yukio Edano
Preceded by Minoru Yanagida	Minister of Justice; 2010–2011	Succeeded by Satsuki Eda
Preceded by Minoru Yanagida	Minister of State for the Abduction Issue; 2010–2011	Succeeded by Kansei Nakano
