= Hirobumi Niki =

Japanese politician (born 1966)

- 仁木 博文
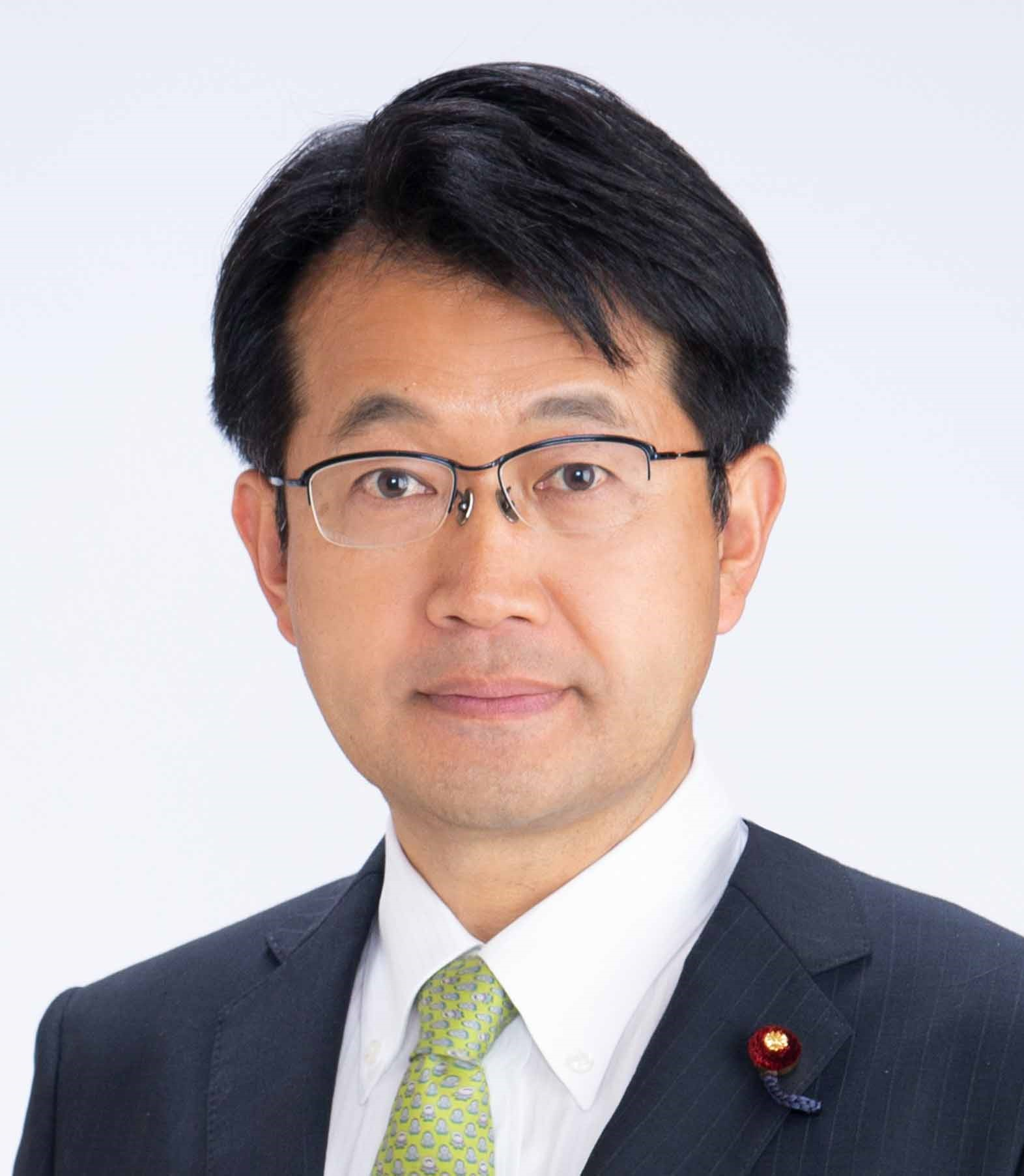
- Official portrait, 2024

Member of the House of Representatives
- Incumbent
- Assumed office 2 November 2021
- Preceded by: Masazumi Gotoda
- Constituency: Tokushima 1st
- In office 31 August 2009 – 16 November 2012
- Constituency: Shikoku PR

Personal details
- Born: 23 May 1966 (age 60) Anan, Tokushima, Japan
- Party: Liberal Democratic (since 2023)
- Other political affiliations: DPJ (2003–2016); DP (2016–2017); KnT (2017–2018); Independent (2018–2023)
- Education: University of Tokyo; University of Tokushima

Hirobumi Niki (仁木博文, Niki Hirobumi; born 23 May 1966) is a Japanese politician serving as deputy minister of health, labour and welfare since 2024. He has been a member of the House of Representatives since 2021, having previously served from 2009 to 2012.
