= Takakazu Seto =

Japanese politician (born 1965)

- 瀬戸 隆一
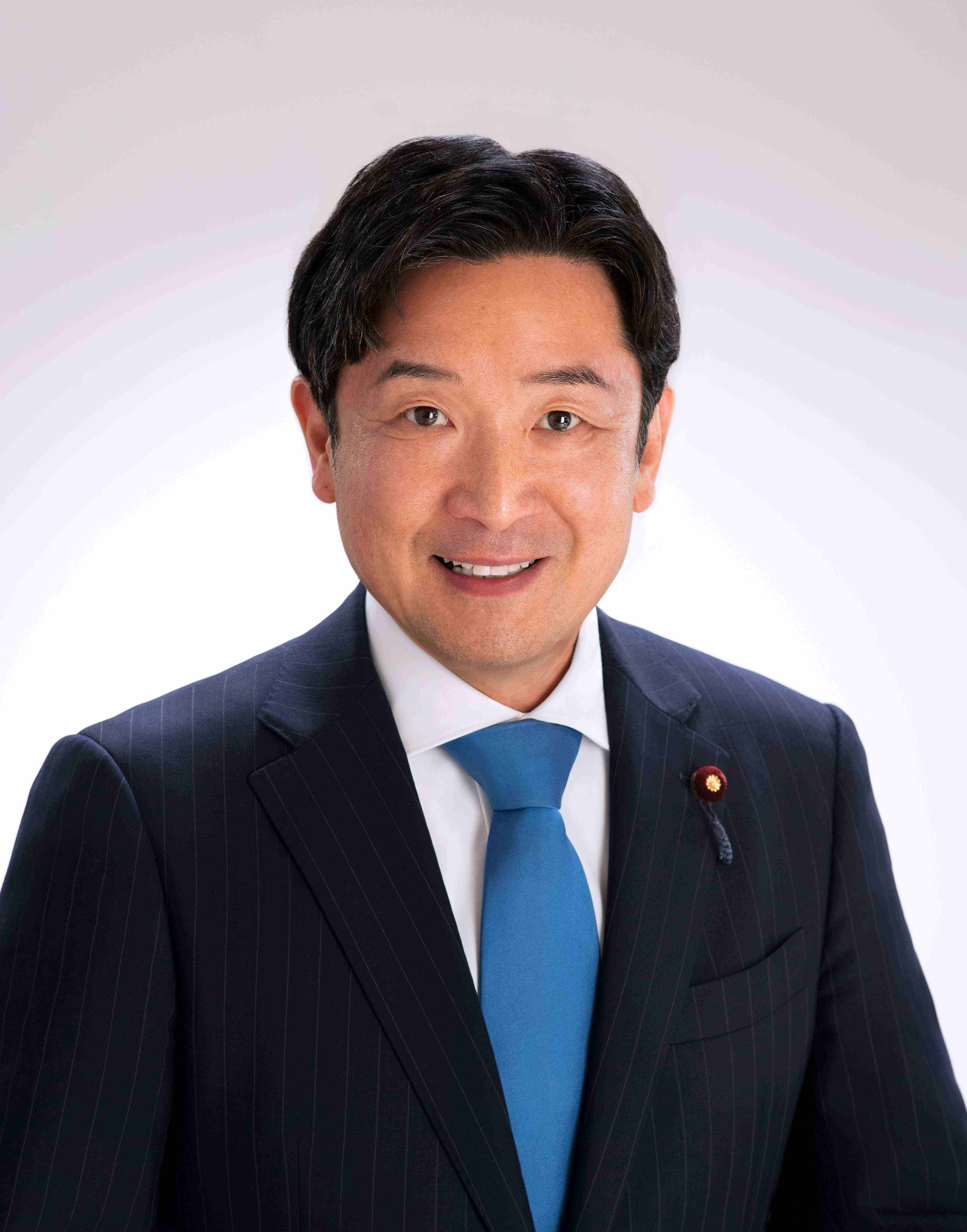
- Official portrait, 2024

Member of the House of Representatives
- Incumbent
- Assumed office 18 January 2023
- Preceded by: Masazumi Gotoda
- Constituency: Shikoku PR
- In office 16 December 2012 – 28 September 2017
- Preceded by: Takuya Hirai
- Succeeded by: Yūji Yamamoto
- Constituency: Shikoku PR

Personal details
- Born: 2 August 1965 (age 61) Sakaide, Kagawa, Japan
- Party: Liberal Democratic (Shikōkai)
- Education: Tokyo Institute of Technology; Osaka Prefecture University

Takakazu Seto (瀬戸隆一, Seto Takakazu; born 2 August 1965) is a Japanese politician serving as state minister of the Cabinet Office since 2024. He has been a member of the House of Representatives since 2023, having previously served from 2012 to 2017.
