= Universal Avenue =

- Company type: Private
- Founded: June 16, 2014
- Headquarters: Stockholm, Sweden
- CEO: Johan Lilja
- Industry: Sales as a Service
- Website: www.universalavenue.com
- Current status: Active

Universal Avenue is a global on demand sales platform headquartered in Stockholm, Sweden. It was founded in 2014 with investment from the company behind the Angry Birds game. The company has to date raised $17m in total capital, most recently a $10m Series A investment in 2016 from London's Eight Roads Ventures.

In 2018, Universal Avenue has acquired Swedish digital agency Varvet. The deal is a strategic move aimed at improving Universal Avenue's technical platform. Universal Avenue also raised €5.3 million in Series B funding through convertible bonds from MOOR Capital. In 2020, founder Jon Kindell repurchased the agency from Universal Avenue, and it has operated independently as Varvet AB since 2020.
