= Kamon Iizumi =

Japanese politician (born 1960)

- 飯泉 嘉門
- Official portrait, 2023

Member of the House of Representatives
- Incumbent
- Assumed office 8 February 2026
- Preceded by: Tomoe Ishii
- Constituency: Shikoku PR

Governor of Tokushima Prefecture
- In office 18 May 2003 – 17 May 2023
- Monarchs: Akihito; Naruhito
- Preceded by: Tadashi Oota
- Succeeded by: Masazumi Gotoda

Personal details
- Born: 29 July 1960 (age 66) Ikeda, Osaka, Japan
- Party: DPP (since 2026)
- Other political affiliations: Independent (until 2026)
- Education: University of Tokyo

Kamon Iizumi (飯泉 嘉門, Iizumi Kamon; born 29 July 1960) is a Japanese politician and a former governor of Tokushima Prefecture. A native of Ikeda, Osaka and graduate of the University of Tokyo, he worked at the Ministry of Home Affairs from 1984. Iizumi was elected as a governor of Tokushima Prefecture in 2003 and served for 5 terms. Iizumi ran for 6th term in 2023, despite LDP officials wanting him to retire. Iizumi ended up third in the elections, receiving 26% of the vote.

Political offices
Preceded by Tadashi Oota	Governor of Tokushima Prefecture; 2003 - 2023	Succeeded by Masazumi Gotoda
