= Ministries of Japan =

Ministries in the Government of Japan

The Ministries of Japan (中央省庁, Chūō shōchō; Central ministries and agencies) or Government Agencies of Japan (行政機関, Gyōsei kikan; Public administration organizations) are the most influential part of the executive branch of the Government of Japan. Each ministry is headed by a Minister of State appointed by the Prime Minister. In postwar politics, the posts of ministers have been given to senior legislators, mostly of the LDP. However, few ministers serve for more than one or two years to develop the necessary grasp of the organisation to become really influential. Thus, most of the power lies within the ministries, with the senior bureaucrats.

The current 15 Cabinet-level ministries of the Government of Japan include:

- the Cabinet Office (内閣府, Naikaku-fu)
- 1 Cabinet-level commission (委員会, īnkai)
- 2 Cabinet-level agencies (官庁, kanchō)
- 11 ministries (省, shō)

The Board of Audit of Japan is responsible for ensuring the adequacy of the Government's financial management by continuously auditing and supervising government activities, and verifying expenditures and revenues of the state.

== List of ministries ==
=== Ministries in the Empire of Japan ===
- Ministry of Agriculture and Commerce (農商務省, abolished in 1925)
- Ministry of Colonial Affairs (拓務省, abolished in 1942)
- Ministry of the Army (陸軍省, abolished in 1945)
- Ministry of the Navy (海軍省, abolished in 1945)
- Ministry of Greater East Asia (大東亜省, abolished in 1945)
- Home Ministry (内務省, abolished in 1947)
- Ministry of Commerce and Industry (商工省, abolished in 1949)

=== Pre-2001 Central Government Reform ===
- Prime Minister's Office (総理府, Sōri fu)
  - National Public Safety Commission (国家公安委員会, Kokka kōan iinkai)
    - National Police Agency (警察庁, Keisatsu chō)
  - Financial Reconstruction Commission (金融再生委員会, Kin-yū saisei iinkai)
  - Management and Coordination Agency (総務庁, Sōmu chō)
  - Hokkaido Development Agency (北海道開発庁, Hokkaidō kaihatsu chō)
  - Defense Agency (防衛庁, Bōei chō)
  - Economic Planning Agency (経済企画庁, Keizai kikaku chō)
  - Science and Technology Agency (科学技術庁, Kagaku gijutsu chō)
  - Environment Agency (環境庁, Kankyō chō)
  - Okinawa Development Agency (沖縄開発庁, Okinawa kaihatsu chō)
  - National Land Agency (国土庁, Kokudo chō)
- Ministry of Justice (法務省, Hōmu shō)
- Ministry of Foreign Affairs (外務省, Gaimu shō)
- Ministry of Finance (大蔵省, Ōkura shō)
- Ministry of Education, Science and Culture (文部省, Monbu shō)
- Ministry of Health and Welfare (厚生省, Kōsei shō)
- Ministry of Agriculture, Forestry and Fisheries (農林水産省, Nōrin suisan shō)
- Ministry of International Trade and Industry (通商産業省, Tsūshō sangyō shō)
- Ministry of Transport (運輸省, Un-yu shō)
- Ministry of Posts and Telecommunications (郵政省, Yūsei shō)
- Ministry of Labour (労働省, Rōdō shō)
- Ministry of Construction (建設省, Kensetsu shō)
- Ministry of Home Affairs (自治省, Jichi shō)

=== Post-2001 Central Government Reform ===
- Cabinet Office (内閣府, Naikaku fu)
  - National Public Safety Commission (国家公安委員会, Kokka kōan iinkai)
    - National Police Agency (警察庁, Keisatsu chō)
  - Defense Agency (防衛庁, Bōei chō)
- Ministry of Public Management, Home Affairs, Posts and Telecommunications (総務省, Sōmu shō)
- Ministry of Justice (法務省, Hōmu shō)
- Ministry of Foreign Affairs (外務省, Gaimu shō)
- Ministry of Finance (財務省, Zaimu shō)
- Ministry of Education, Culture, Sports, Science and Technology (文部科学省, Monbu kagaku shō)
- Ministry of Health, Labour and Welfare (厚生労働省, Kōsei rōdō shō)
- Ministry of Agriculture, Forestry and Fisheries (農林水産省, Nōrin suisan shō)
- Ministry of Economy, Trade and Industry (経済産業省, Keizai sangyō shō)
- Ministry of Land, Infrastructure and Transport (国土交通省, Kokudo kōtsū shō)
- Ministry of the Environment (環境省, Kankyō shō)

As a result of the reforms in 2001, many ministries were reformed.

- The Financial Reconstruction Commission was abolished.
- Prime Minister's Office + Economic Planning Agency + Okinawa Development Agency = Cabinet Office
- Management and Coordination Agency + Ministry of Posts and Telecommunications + Ministry of Home Affairs = Ministry of Public Management, Home Affairs, Posts and Telecommunications
- Science and Technology Agency + Ministry of Education, Science and Culture = Ministry of Education, Culture, Sports, Science and Technology
- Ministry of Health and Welfare + Ministry of Labour = Ministry of Health, Labour and Welfare
- The Ministry of International Trade and Industry changed its name into "Ministry of Economy, Trade and Industry".
- Hokkaido Development Agency + National Land Agency + Ministry of Transport + Ministry of Construction = Ministry of Land, Infrastructure and Transport
- The Environment Agency was reorganized into "Ministry of the Environment".

=== As of April 2023 ===
- Cabinet Office (内閣府, Naikaku fu)
- National Public Safety Commission (国家公安委員会, Kokka kōan iinkai)
- Digital Agency (デジタル庁, Dejitaru chō)
- Reconstruction Agency (復興庁, Fukkō chō)
- Children and Families Agency (こども家庭庁, Kodomo katei chō)
- Ministry of Internal Affairs and Communications (総務省, Sōmu shō)
- Ministry of Justice (法務省, Hōmu shō)
- Ministry of Foreign Affairs (外務省, Gaimu shō)
- Ministry of Finance (財務省, Zaimu shō)
- Ministry of Education, Culture, Sports, Science and Technology (文部科学省, Monbu kagaku shō)
- Ministry of Health, Labour and Welfare (厚生労働省, Kōsei rōdō shō)
- Ministry of Agriculture, Forestry and Fisheries (農林水産省, Nōrin suisan shō)
- Ministry of Economy, Trade and Industry (経済産業省, Keizai sangyō shō)
- Ministry of Land, Infrastructure, Transport and Tourism (国土交通省, Kokudo kōtsū shō)
- Ministry of the Environment (環境省, Kankyō shō)
- Ministry of Defense (防衛省, Bōei shō)

Several other smaller reforms were also made after the larger central government reforms were implemented in 2001.

- In 2004, the Ministry of Public Management, Home Affairs, Posts and Telecommunications, changed its English name into "Ministry of Internal Affairs and Communications" (Japanese name was not changed).
- In 2007, the Defense Agency was reorganized into the "Ministry of Defense".
- In 2008, the Ministry of Land, Infrastructure and Transport changed its English name to "Ministry of Land, Infrastructure, Transport and Tourism" (Japanese name was not changed).
- In 2012, the Reconstruction Agency was established in the aim of recovery from 2011 Tōhoku earthquake and tsunami.
- In 2021, the Digital Agency was established in the aim to promote e-government and digital transformation.
- In 2023, the Children and Families Agency was established.

== List of ministers of state ==
- Prime Minister (内閣総理大臣)
- Deputy Prime Minister (副総理)
- Minister for Internal Affairs and Communications (総務大臣)
- Minister of Justice (法務大臣)
- Minister for Foreign Affairs (外務大臣)
- Minister of Finance (財務大臣)
- Minister of Education, Culture, Sports, Science and Technology (文部科学大臣)
- Minister of Health, Labour and Welfare (厚生労働大臣)
- Minister of Agriculture, Forestry and Fisheries (農林水産大臣)
- Minister of Economy, Trade and Industry (経済産業大臣)
- Minister of Land, Infrastructure, Transport and Tourism (国土交通大臣)
- Minister of the Environment (環境大臣)
- Minister of Defense (防衛大臣)
- Chief Cabinet Secretary (内閣官房長官)
- Digital Minister (デジタル大臣)
- Minister for Reconstruction (復興大臣)
- Chairperson of the National Public Safety Commission (国家公安委員会委員長)
- Minister of State for Okinawa and Northern Territories Affairs (内閣府特命担当大臣- 沖縄及び北方対策)
- Minister of State for Gender Equality (内閣府特命担当大臣: 男女共同参画)
- Minister of State for Youth Affairs and Measures for Declining Birthrate (内閣府特命担当大臣- 青少年育成及び少子化対策)
- Minister of State for Disaster Management (内閣府特命担当大臣- 防災)
- Minister of State for National Emergency Legislation (内閣府特命担当大臣- 有事法制担当)
- Minister of State for Financial Policy (内閣府特命担当大臣- 金融)
- Minister of State for Economic and Fiscal Policy (内閣府特命担当大臣- 経済財政政策)
- Minister of State for Privatization of the Postal Services (内閣府特命担当大臣- 郵政民営化担当)
- Minister of State for Regulatory Reform (内閣府特命担当大臣- 規制改革)
- Minister of State for Industrial Revitalization Corporation of Japan (内閣府特命担当大臣- 産業再生機構)
- Minister of State for Administrative Reform (内閣府特命担当大臣- 行政改革担当)
- Minister of State for Special Zones for Structural Reform (内閣府特命担当大臣- 構造改革特区)
- Minister of State for Regional Revitalization (内閣府特命担当大臣- 地域再生担当)
- Minister of State for Science and Technology Policy (内閣府特命担当大臣- 科学技術政策)
- Minister of State for Food Safety (内閣府特命担当大臣- 食品安全)
- Minister of State for Information Technology (内閣府特命担当大臣- 情報通信技術（IT）担当)
