= Minister for Digital Transformation =

Japanese cabinet minister

- Emblem of the Government of Japan

- Incumbent; Toshiharu Furukawa since 17 September 2026
- Digital Agency
- Style: His Excellency
- Member of: Cabinet of Japan
- Reports to: Prime Minister of Japan
- Appointer: Prime Minister; subject to formal attestation by the Emperor
- Formation: September 1, 2021; 5 years ago
- Deputy: State Minister of Digital Agency; Parliamentary Vice-Minister for Digital
- Salary: ¥29,530,000

The Minister for Digital Transformation (デジタル大臣, Dejitaru Daijin) is a member of the cabinet of Japan and is the leader and chief executive of the Digital Agency. The minister is responsible for overseeing Japan's transformation to a digital economy. The minister is nominated by the Prime Minister and is appointed by the Emperor of Japan.

It began operations on 1 September 2021 after being formed as a result of the Digital Agency Establishment Act, making it the newest Ministerial position in the Cabinet. The current Minister for Digital Transformation is Toshiharu Furukawa, who took office October 1, 2024 as a member of the Takaichi Cabinet.

== English translation ==
The English translation of the ministerial title has been changed several times. During deliberations of the Digital Agency Establishment Act, the English title provided on the outline of the legislation was "Digital Minister". After the appointment of Takuya Hirai, there was no English title, as the English version of the Cabinet Office's List of Ministers, State Ministers and Parliamentary Vice-Ministers only listed the name of Takuya Hirai without any mention of the English title. The English title for the position was changed to Minister for Digital Agency with the inauguration of the First Kishida Cabinet, but was later changed to Minister for Digital. Since 2022, Minister for Digital Transformation has been used for the English title of the position.

== List of Ministers for Digital Transformation ==
Liberal Democratic

Digital Minister			Term of office			Prime Minister
#	Portrait	Name	Took office	Left office	Days	Prime Minister
1		Takuya Hirai	September 1, 2021	October 4, 2021	33	Yoshihide Suga
2		Karen Makishima	October 4, 2021	August 10, 2022	310	Fumio Kishida
3		Taro Kono	August 10, 2022	October 1, 2024	783	Fumio Kishida
4		Masaaki Taira	October 1, 2024	October 21, 2025	385	Shigeru Ishiba
5		Hisashi Matsumoto	October 21, 2025	September 17, 2026	331	Sanae Takaichi
6		Toshiharu Furukawa	September 17, 2026	Incumbent	29	Sanae Takaichi
