= Kanagawa 17th district =

Japanese electoral district

Kanagawa 17th District
- Parliamentary constituency for the Japanese House of Representatives
- Numbered map of Kanagawa Prefecture single-member districts
- Prefecture: Kanagawa
- Proportional District: Southern Kanto
- Electorate: 449,062

Current constituency
- Created: 1994
- Seats: One
- Party: LDP

Kanagawa 17th district is a single-member constituency of the House of Representatives, the lower house of the national Diet of Japan. As of June 1, 2023, the district has an electorate of 447,436. The district covers the western portions of the prefecture.

== List of representatives ==
Election	Representative	Party	Dates	Notes
1996	Yōhei Kōno	LDP	1996 – 2009	
2000	Yōhei Kōno	LDP	1996 – 2009	
2003	Yōhei Kōno	LDP	1996 – 2009	
2005	Yōhei Kōno	LDP	1996 – 2009	
2009	Yōsuke Kamiyama	DPJ	2009 – 2012	
2012	Karen Makishima	LDP	2012 – present	Incumbent
2014	Karen Makishima	LDP	2012 – present	Incumbent
2017	Karen Makishima	LDP	2012 – present	Incumbent
2021	Karen Makishima	LDP	2012 – present	Incumbent
2024	Karen Makishima	LDP	2012 – present	Incumbent
2026	Karen Makishima	LDP	2012 – present	Incumbent

== Election results ==
2026
Party	Candidate	Votes	%	±%
LDP	Karen Makishima (incumbent)	106,966	48.39	▼2.53
Centrist Reform	Naomi Sasaki	68,358	30.92	▼18.16
DPP	Taichi Nakamura	45,727	20.69	New
Majority		38,608	17.47	▲15.63
Registered electors		439,744		
Turnout		221,051	51.46	▼1.64
LDP hold				

2024
Party	Candidate	Votes	%	±%
LDP	Karen Makishima (incumbent)	115,235	50.92	▼4.40
CDP	Naomi Sasaki (won PR seat)	111,061	49.08	▲11.23
Majority		4,174	1.84	
Registered electors		443,138		
Turnout			53.10	▼3.88
LDP hold				

2021
Party	Candidate	Votes	%	±%
LDP	Karen Makishima (Incumbent)	131,284	55.32	▲4.05
CDP	Yōsuke Kamiyama	89,837	37.85	New
JCP	Tadashi Yamada	16,202	6.83	▼5.35
Registered electors		424,659		
Turnout		237,323	56.98	▲2.69

2017
Party	Candidate	Votes	%	±%
LDP	Karen Makishima (Incumbent)	117,003	51.27	▼2.15
Kibō	Yōsuke Kamiyama (Incumbent - PR)	83,407	36.55	New
JCP	Eiji Yokota	27,798	12.18	▲1.56
Registered electors		430,786		
Turnout		228,208	54.29	▲0.59

2014
Party	Candidate	Votes	%	±%
LDP	Karen Makishima (Incumbent)	118,537	53.42	▲14.66
DPJ	Yōsuke Kamiyama (elected by PR)	79,788	35.96	▲17.51
JCP	Fukuji Yoshida	23,569	10.62	▲6.73
Registered electors		425,376		
Turnout		221,894	53.70	▼6.94

2012
Party	Candidate	Votes	%	±%
LDP	Karen Makishima	98,019	38.76	▲2.58
YP	Yoshiyuki Inoue	54,337	21.49	New
DPJ	Yōsuke Kamiyama (Incumbent)	46,654	18.45	▼29.31
TPJ	Junichi Tsuyuki	44,013	17.41	New
JCP	Eiji Yokota	9,848	3.89	▼3.30
Registered electors		426,043		
Turnout		252,871	60.64	▼9.09

2009
Party	Candidate	Votes	%	±%
DPJ	Yōsuke Kamiyama	139,678	47.76	▲15.63
LDP	Karen Makishima	105,806	36.18	▼24.51
Independent	Yoshiyuki Inoue	42,881	14.66	New
HRP	Junko Nakano	4,067	1.39	New
Registered electors		427,538		
Turnout		292,432	69.73	▲2.30

2005
Party	Candidate	Votes	%	±%
LDP	Yōhei Kōno (Incumbent)	169,825	60.69	▲3.35
DPJ	Naoto Sakaguchi	89,901	32.13	▼2.60
JCP	Shinzaburō Suzuki	20,117	7.19	▼0.74
Turnout		279,843	67.43	

2003
Party	Candidate	Votes	%	±%
LDP	Yōhei Kōno (Incumbent)	135,206	57.34	▲0.90
DPJ	Naoto Sakaguchi	81,900	34.73	▲0.43
JCP	Shinzaburō Suzuki	18,690	7.93	▼1.33
Turnout				

2000
Party	Candidate	Votes	%	±%
LDP	Yōhei Kōno (Incumbent)	140,236	56.44	▲11.69
DPJ	Tsurunen Marutei	85,227	34.30	New
JCP	Shinzaburō Suzuki	23,019	9.26	▲0.09
Turnout				

1996
Party	Candidate	Votes	%	±%
LDP	Yōhei Kōno	105,282	44.75	New
Independent	Junichi Tsuyuki	59,005	25.08	New
NFP	Naoyuki Saito	49,419	21.00	New
JCP	Mutsuo Ozawa	21,572	9.17	New
Turnout				

== See also ==
- List of districts of the House of Representatives of Japan
