= Masazumi Gotoda =

Japanese politician

- 後藤田 正純
- Official portrait, 2025

Governor of Tokushima Prefecture
- Incumbent
- Assumed office 18 May 2023
- Monarch: Naruhito
- Preceded by: Kamon Iizumi

Member of the House of Representatives
- In office 25 June 2000 – 5 January 2023
- Preceded by: Yoshihisa Iwasa
- Succeeded by: Takakazu Seto
- Constituency: Tokushima 3rd (2000–2014); Tokushima 1st (2014–2021); Shikoku PR (2021–2023)

Personal details
- Born: 後藤田正純 (Masazumi Gotoda); 5 August 1969 (age 57) Tama, Tokyo, Japan
- Party: Liberal Democratic
- Spouse: Maki Mizuno
- Relatives: Masaharu Gotōda (great-uncle)
- Education: Keio University
- Website: Official website

Masazumi Gotoda (後藤田 正純, Gotōda Masazumi; born 5 August 1969) is a Japanese politician and the current governor of Tokushima Prefecture. A native of Oe District, Tokushima and graduate of Keio University, he worked at Mitsubishi Corporation from 1993 to 1998. Gotoda was a member of the House of Representatives in the Diet, for the Liberal Democratic Party, between 2000 and 2023. In 2023 he was elected as governor of Tokushima, defeating three other candidates including 5-term incumbent Kamon Iizumi.

== Personal life ==
Gotoda is married to actress Maki Mizuno. The couple has a son born in 2005.
