= Yoshiro Okamoto =

Japanese politician

- 岡本 芳郎
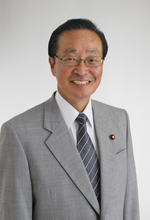

Member of the House of Representatives
- In office 9 November 2003 – 21 July 2009
- Preceded by: Mamoru Nishida
- Succeeded by: Multi-member district
- Constituency: Shikoku PR

Personal details
- Born: 5 October 1943 (age 82) Tokushima City, Tokushima, Japan
- Party: Liberal Democratic
- Education: University of Tokyo

Yoshiro Okamoto (岡本 芳郎, Okamoto Yoshiro; born 5 October 1943) is a Japanese politician of the Liberal Democratic Party, a member of the House of Representatives in the Diet (national legislature). A native of Tokushima, Tokushima, he graduated from the University of Tokyo in March 1967. He then joined the Ministry of Agriculture and Forestry, which is now part of Ministry of Agriculture, Forestry and Fisheries. In June 1997 he also received a Ph.D. in agriculture while still in the ministry. He left the ministry in the following year to run for the House of Representatives in the 2000 election but lost. He ran again in 2003 and was elected for the first time.
