= Busshozan =

Coordinates: 34°16′42.6″N 134°02′52.5″E

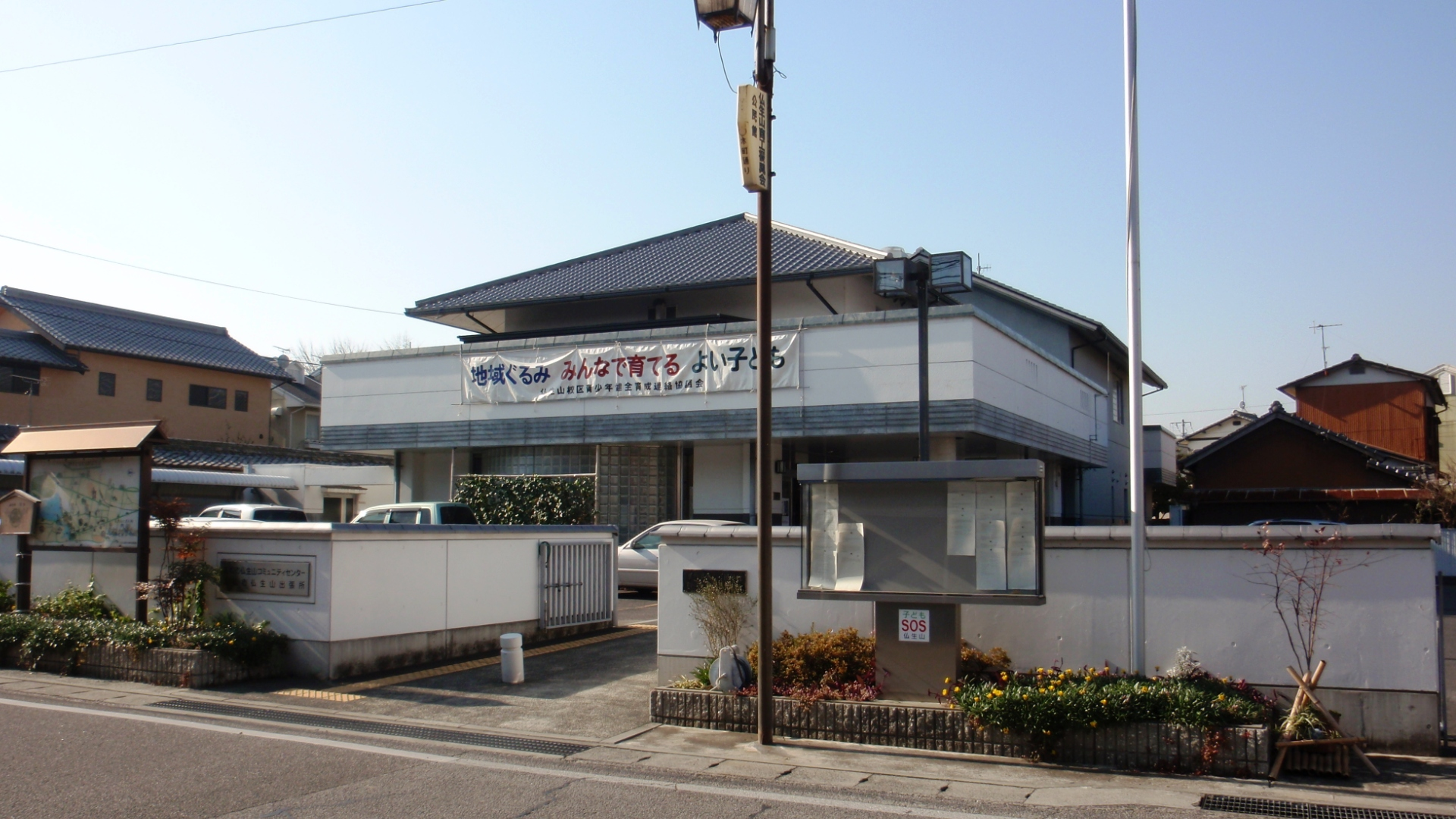
Busshozan Branch Office of Takamatsu City Hall in Kagawa Prefecture.

Busshozan (仏生山, Busshōzan) is an outlying suburb of Takamatsu, Kagawa in Japan.

The main feature of Busshozan suburb is the old main street (Honchou Douri) leading to Chikiri Shrine. The houses lining the street are of the traditional wooden variety, and some are officially listed as monuments. Chikiri Shrine itself is a small collection of ramshackle wooden buildings on the top of a small, jagged hill. Beside the shrine is Heike pond, Busshozan Park, and Hounenji Temple, which is a substantial structure, and is the burial place of a local lord and his family.

In 2005, Busshozan Onsen, a Japanese hot spring, was established.
