= Digital Agency =

Japanese government agency

- デジタル庁; Dejitaru-chō

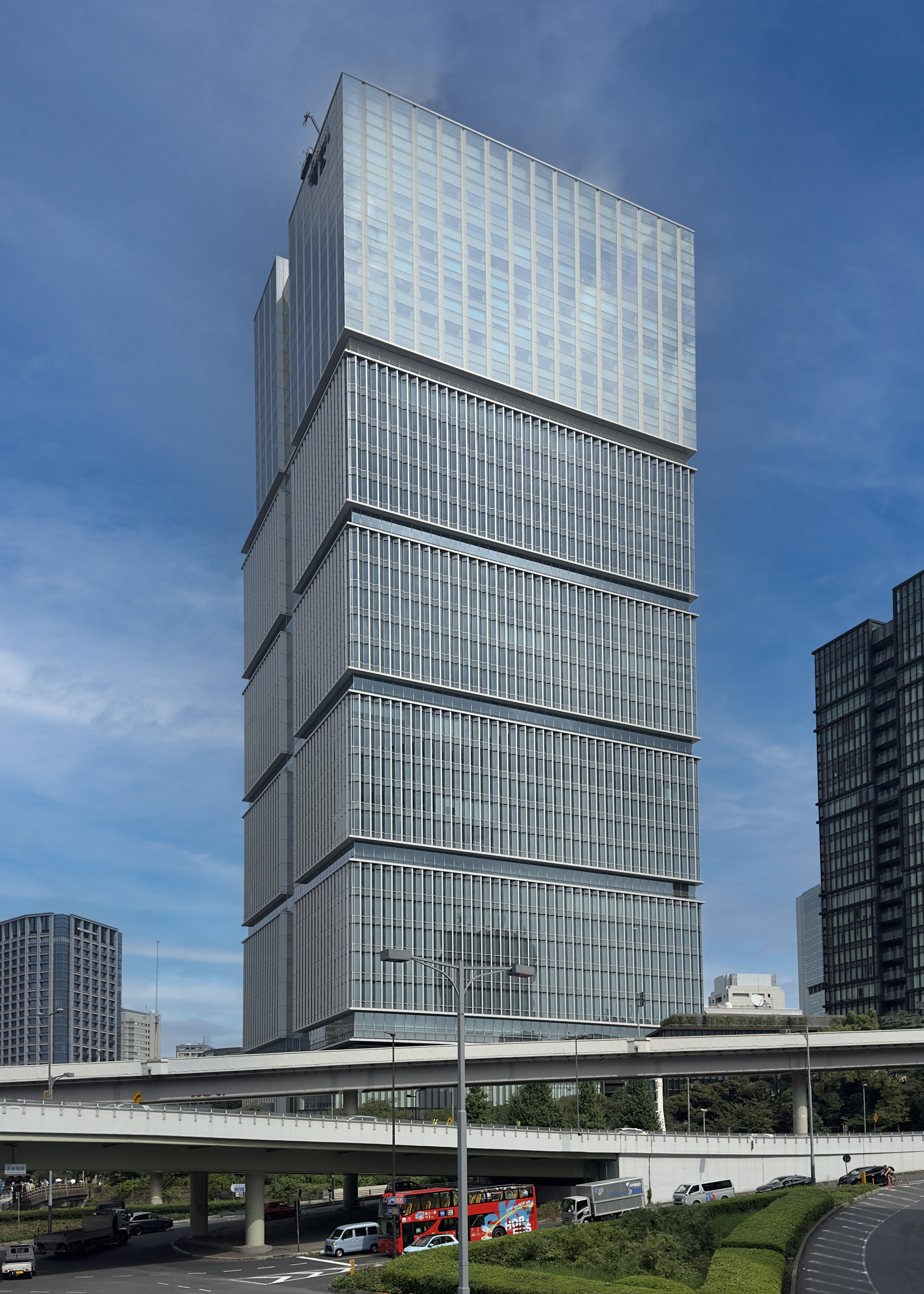
- The Tokyo Garden Terrace Kioicho, where the office of the Digital Agency is located.

Agency overview
- Formed: September 1, 2021
- Jurisdiction: Japan
- Headquarters: Tokyo Garden Terrace Kioicho 19th floor, 1-3 Kioicho, Chiyoda-ku, Tokyo 102-0094, Japan
- Annual budget: ¥ 36.8 billion (2021)
- Minister responsible: Toshiharu Furukawa, Minister for Digital Transformation
- Deputy Ministers responsible: Yasushi Hosaka, State Minister for Digital; Nobuchiyo Kishi, Parliamentary Vice-Minister for Digital
- Agency executive: Takashi Asanuma, Chief Digital Officer
- Parent agency: Cabinet of Japan
- Website: digital.go.jp

The Digital Agency (デジタル庁, Dejitaru-chō) is an agency of the Japanese government established on September 1, 2021, aimed at strengthening digitalization in Japan. The slogan is “Government as a Startup”.

== Overview ==
Even before the Digital Agency establishment bill was passed, the Cabinet Secretariat's Information Technology (IT) Comprehensive Strategy Office and Social Security and Tax Number System promotion office were active in their respective fields.

The Cabinet of Yoshihide Suga has set up a signboard policy of promoting digitalization by establishing a new Digital Agency and eliminating vertically divided administrative functions.

The Digital Agency is responsible for the IT field for the purpose of promoting IT and DX (digital transformation) of national and local governments. In addition, about 130 out of about 600 employees at the time of inauguration are appointed from the private sector such as IT companies.

Takuya Hirai was appointed as the first Digital Minister, and Yoko Ishikura, an emeritus professor at Hitotsubashi University, was appointed as the first Chief Digital Officer. Karen Makishima was appointed as the Minister in the next cabinet. In April 2022, it was reported that Yoko Ishikura will step down as chief of the Digital Agency due to health issues. Ishikura’s replacement has not yet been selected but the government plans to consider electing someone from the private sector. Ishikura was replaced by Takashi Asanuma.

== Main mission ==
- National government information system
  - Eliminate the harmful effects of vertically divided administration, promote the integration and integration of government information systems, and facilitate cooperation with private sector systems
- Digital infrastructure common to all regions
  - standardization of information systems of local governments
- Individual Number (the Social Security and Tax Number System)
  - Realization of a society where the people can carry out administrative procedures online in a one-stop manner by utilizing the Individual Number
  - The Suga Cabinet is committed to having all citizens possess an Individual Number personal identification card by the end of 2022.
- "Semi-public" field
  - Promotion of digitalization in fields closely related to daily life such as medical care, education, and disaster prevention
- Data utilization
  - Development of a "base registry" that serves as basic data for society
  - Achievement of administrative procedures "once only" (the principle that information once sent does not need to be resent)

== Criticism ==
=== Entertainment coverage by NTT presidents ===
After Takuya Hirai became 1st Digital Minister, it was reported that Hirai was suspected of being entertained by The Nippon Telegraph and Telephone Corporation (NTT) President Jun Sawada twice, on October 2 and December 4, 2020.

On September 24, 2021, Digital Deputy Director General Koichi Akaishi was disciplined for a one-tenth (one month) reduction in salary for receiving excessive entertainment.
