= Takuya Hirai =

Japanese politician

- 平井 卓也
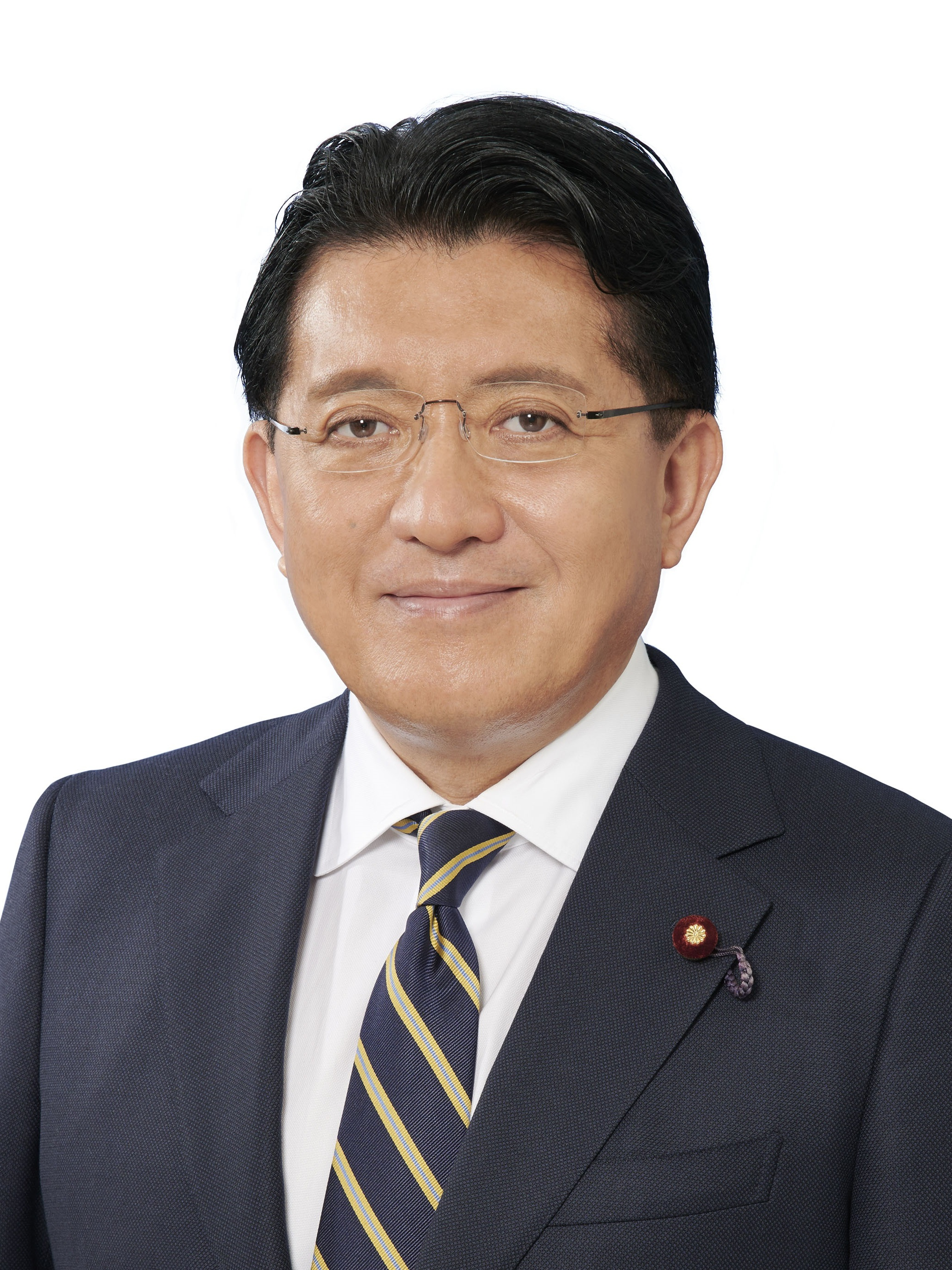
- Official portrait, 2020

Minister for Digital Transformation
- In office 1 September 2021 – 4 October 2021
- Prime Minister: Yoshihide Suga
- Preceded by: Office established
- Succeeded by: Karen Makishima

Member of the House of Representatives
- Incumbent
- Assumed office 25 June 2000
- Preceded by: Takao Fujimoto
- Constituency: Kagawa 1st (2000–2009); Shikoku PR (2009–2012); Kagawa 1st (2012–2021); Shikoku PR (2021–present)

Personal details
- Born: 25 January 1958 (age 68) Takamatsu, Kagawa, Japan
- Party: LDP (since 2000)
- Other political affiliations: NFP (1996–1997); Independent (1997–2000)
- Parent: Takushi Hirai (father)
- Relatives: Tarō Hirai (grandfather)

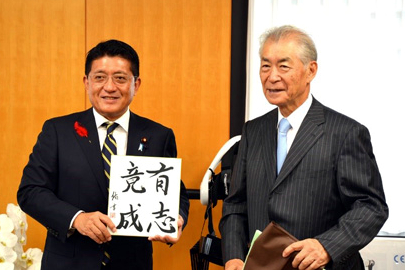
Takuya Hirai with Tasuku Honjo

Takuya Hirai is a Japanese politician of the Liberal Democratic Party (LDP), a member of the House of Representatives in the Diet (national legislature). A native of Takamatsu, Kagawa and graduate of Sophia University he was elected to the House of Representatives for the first time in 2000 as a member of the New Frontier Party after running unsuccessfully as an independent in 1996. He later joined LDP.

On 1 September 2021, he became the Digital Minister, who has jurisdiction over the Digital Agency.

Prior to entering politics, he was the president of Nishinippon Broadcasting, which is owned by him and his family.

== Personal history ==
- 政治家情報 〜平井 たくや〜. JANJAN ザ･選挙 (in Japanese). Archived from the original on 25 October 2007.
