= Azabu University =

Private university in Japan

Coordinates: 35°34′30″N 139°23′18″E

- 麻布大学; Azabu Daigaku
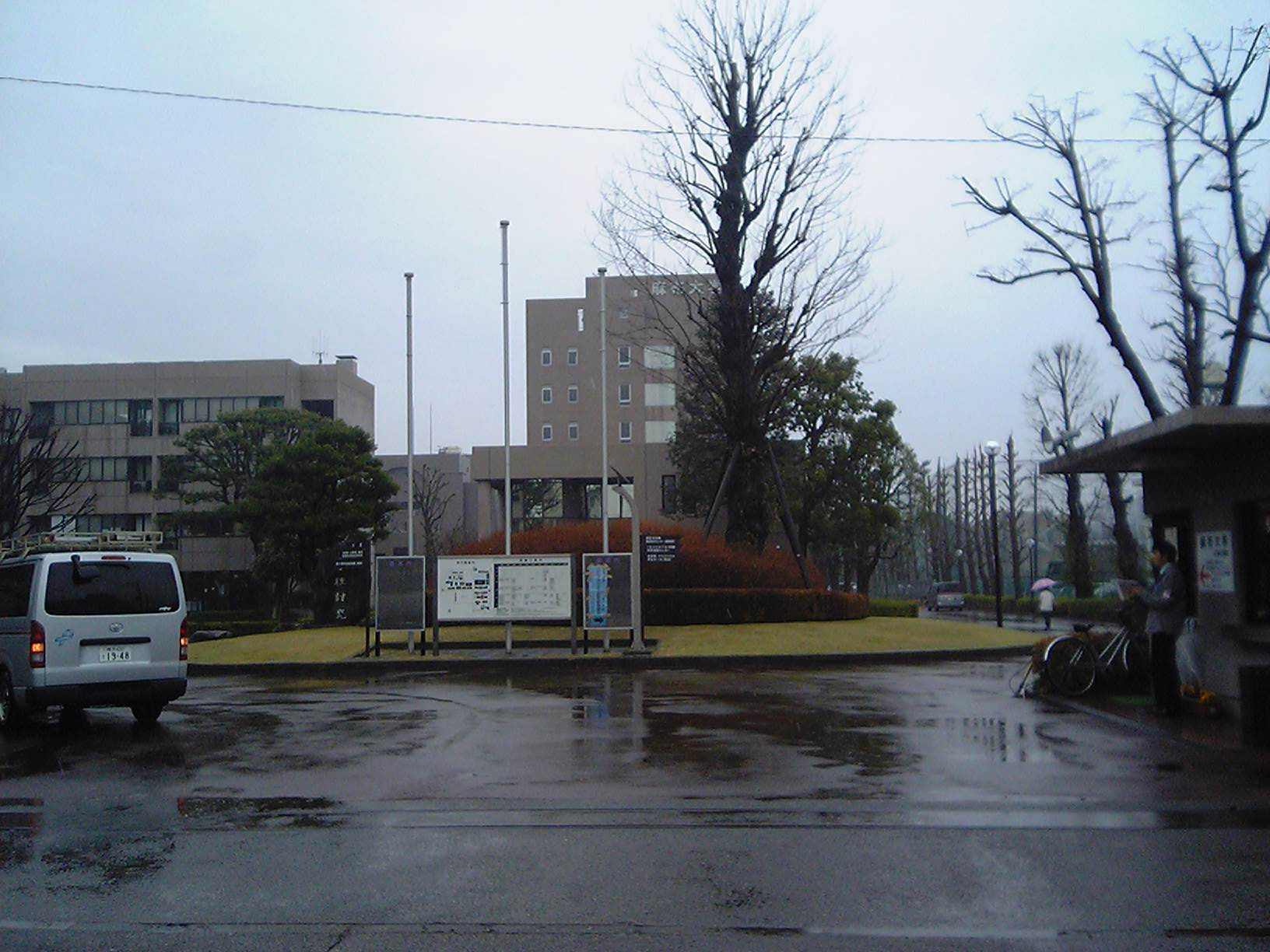
- Type: Private
- Established: 1890
- Location: Sagamihara, Kanagawa, Japan
- Website: Official website

Azabu University (麻布大学, Azabu daigaku) is a private university in Sagamihara, Kanagawa, Japan. The predecessor of the school was founded in 1890.

The school has no relation to Azabu High School in Tokyo.

== History ==
The predecessor of Azabu University was the Tokyo Veterinary Training School, established in September 1890. It was renamed Azabu Veterinary School in January 1894 and Azabu Veterinary Technical School in 1934. The facilities of the school in downtown Tokyo were destroyed by the bombing of Tokyo in World War II in May 1945.

The school was reestablished in June 1947 on its present location in Sagamihara, Kanagawa and renamed Azabu Veterinary College in April 1950. A graduate school program was begun in April 1960. The school expanded with the establishment of the College of Environmental Health in April 1978 and was renamed Azabu University in April 1980. A Research Institute of Biosciences was established in 1988.
