= Megijima =

Island in Seto Inland Sea, Japan

Coordinates: 34°23′43″N 134°3′0″E

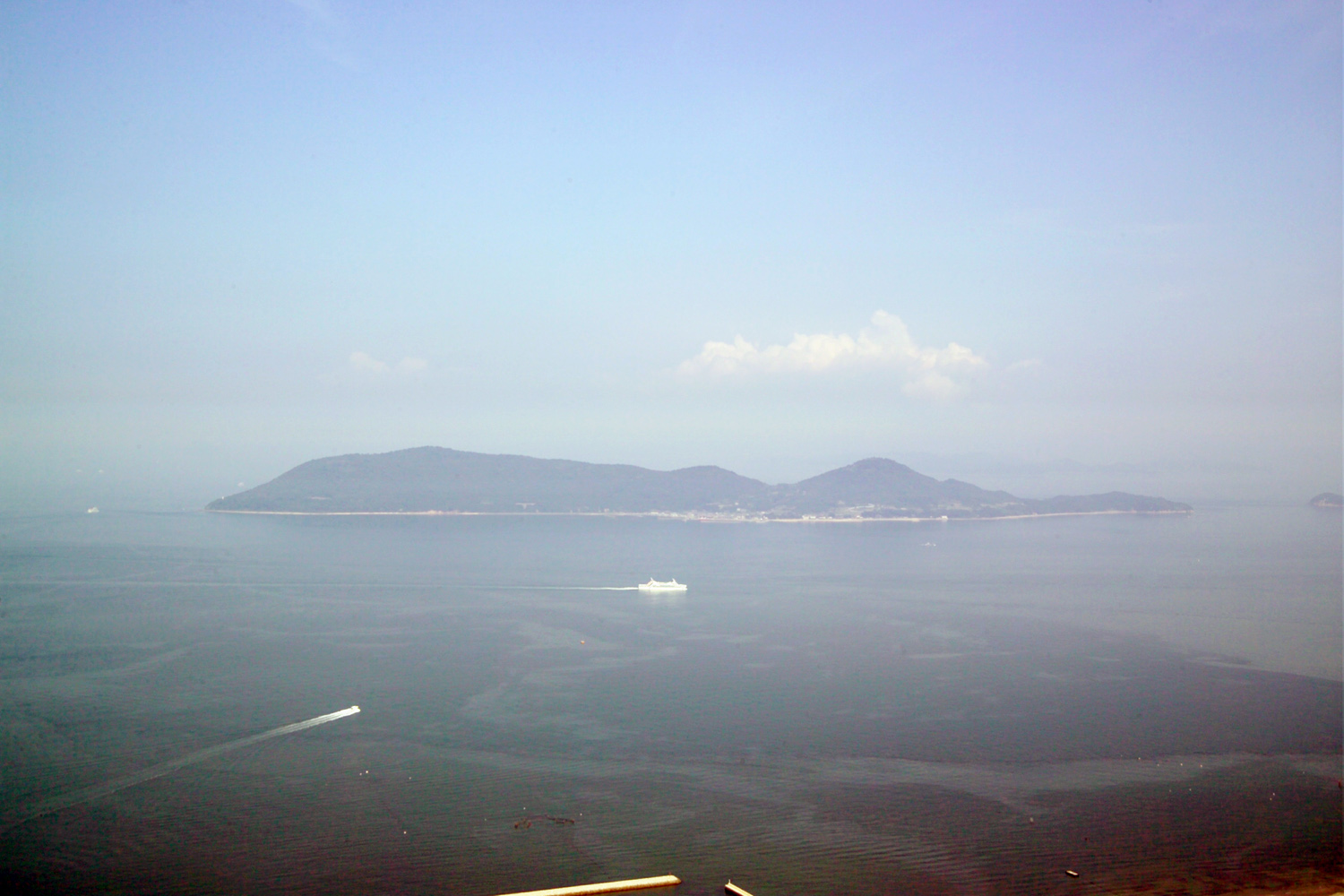
Megijima as seen from Takamatsu

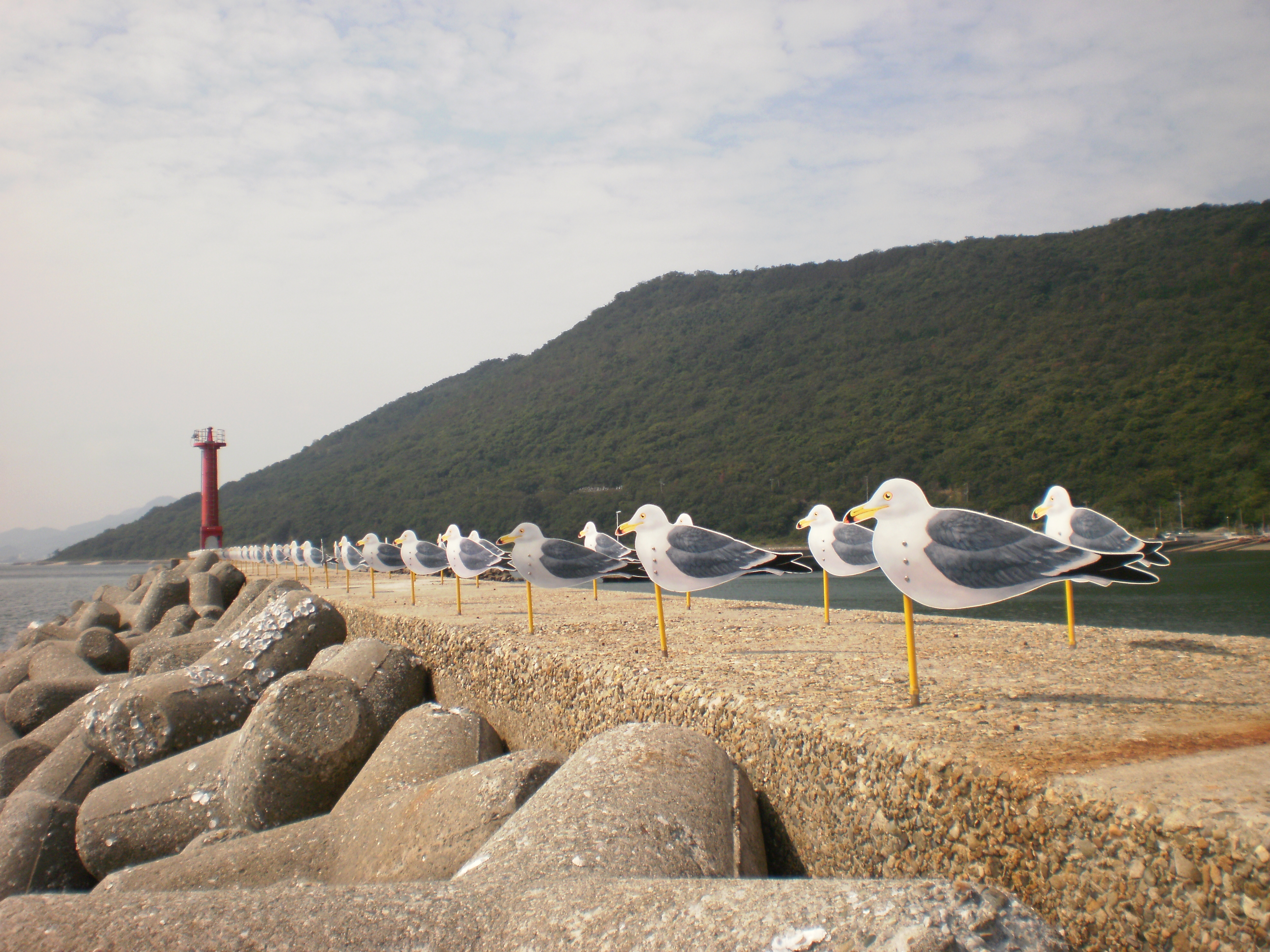
Contemporary art on Megijima

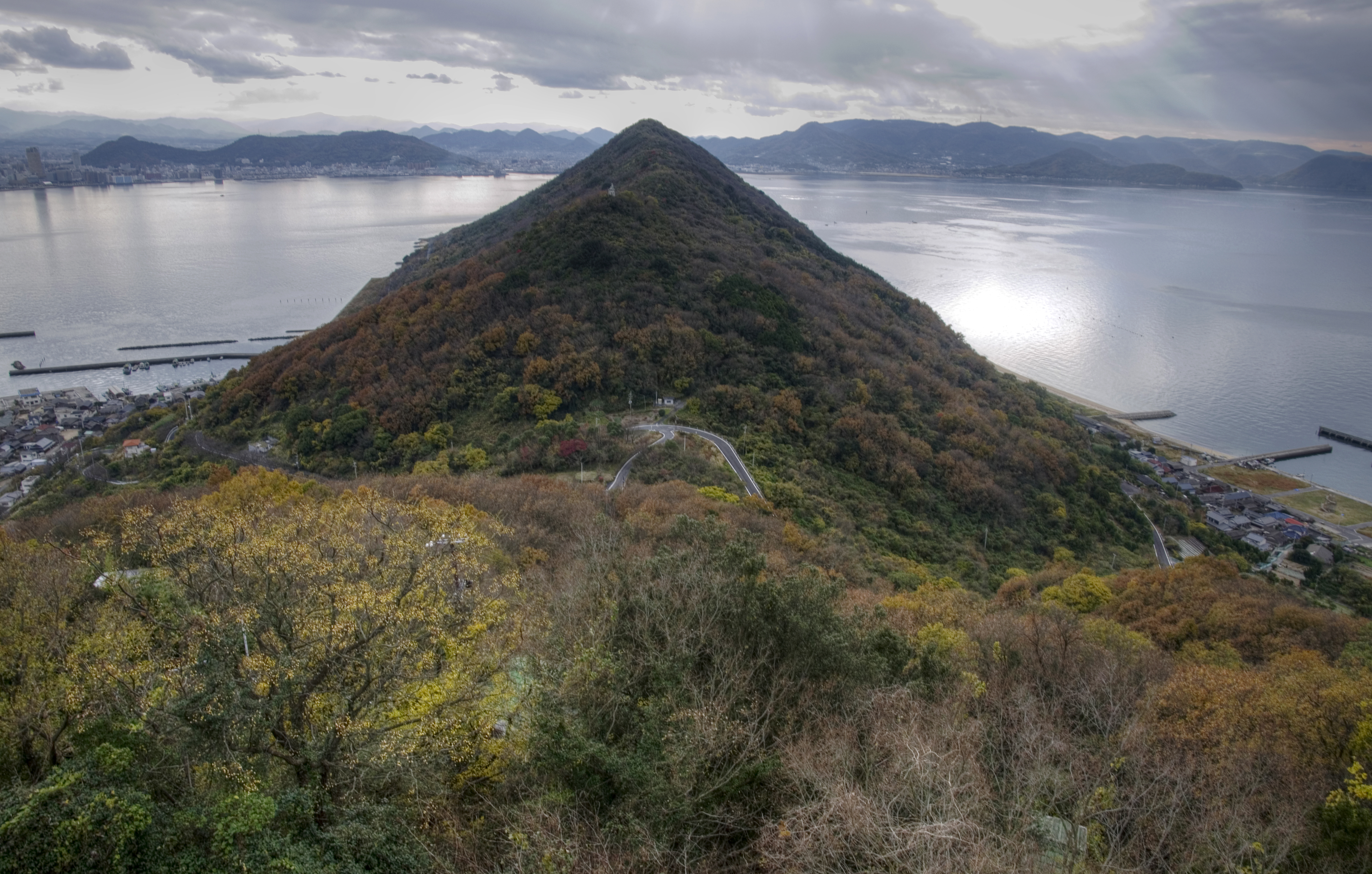
Takatoyama - the highest Megijima peak

Megijima (女木島, めぎじま) is an island located in the Seto Inland Sea of Japan, north of the city of Takamatsu, and is part of Kagawa Prefecture. It has an area of 2.66 km^{2}, a coastline of 8.9 km, and a population of about 200. Megijima is a popular destination in summer on account of its public beach and close proximity to Takamatsu City (approx. 4 km). Additionally, with over 2000 cherry blossom trees, Megijima also sees an influx of visitors during the springtime when people congregate for cherry blossom viewing.

The island has been linked to the mythical island Onigashima ("island of ogres"), visited by the folktale character Momotarō. The caves at the top of Washigamine Summit, as the home of the ogres from that story, are a popular tourist spot. There is an observation platform at the peak of Washigamine Summit where one can get a 360 degree view of the Seto Inland Sea.

Megijima is also one of the host sites of the Setouchi Triennale. During the festival period, many temporary and permanent art exhibitions are installed across the island. Some of the sights on the island such as the cave and beach are also featured in the Key visual novel Summer Pockets.

== See also ==
- Kagawa Prefecture
- Ogijima
