= Ogijima =

Island in Seto Inland Sea, Japan

Coordinates: 34°25′42″N 134°3′40″E

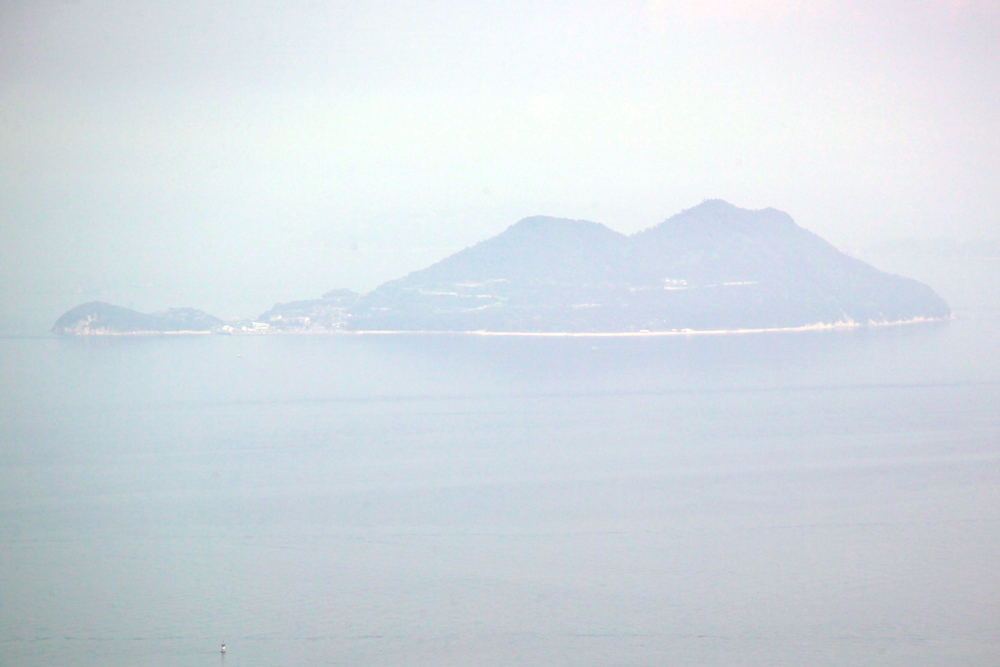
Ogijima seen from Yashima

Ogijima (男木島, おぎじま or おぎしま) is an island in the Seto Inland Sea, in southern Japan. It is next to Megijima (女木島), a few kilometers at sea north of Takamatsu, in Kagawa Prefecture. It is about two kilometers long and less than a kilometer wide. The island is largely mountainous and flat land is scarce. The population in 2010 was 202 people. Ogichō is the island's only village.

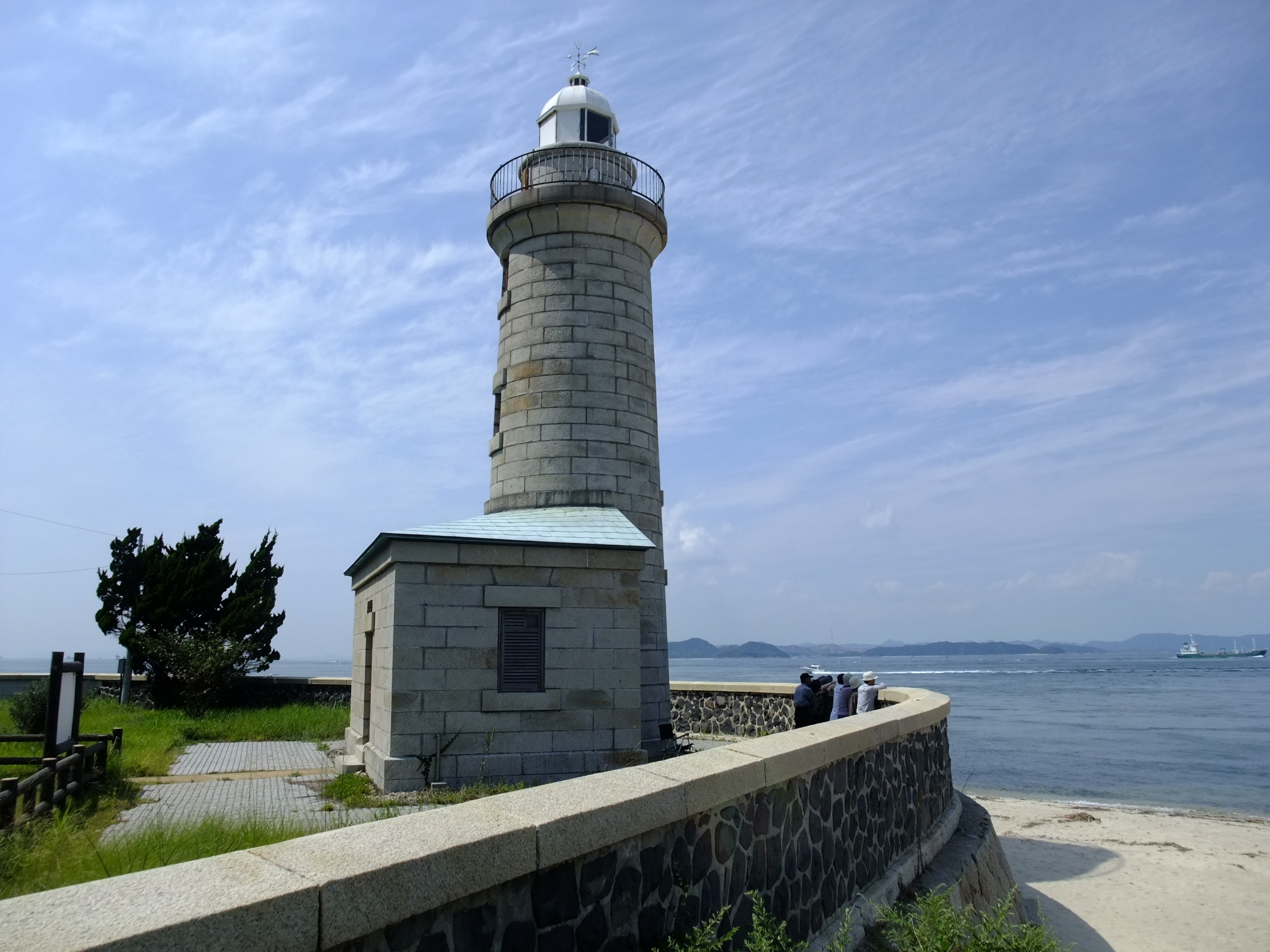
Ogijima lighthouse

A notable granite lighthouse is located at the northern end of Ogijima; the lighthouse annex is now a museum. Ogijima was the inspiration for the fictitious island of Okijima in the novel Battle Royale. Some of the sights on the island are also featured in the Key visual novel Summer Pockets.
