= Karen Makishima =

Japanese politician

- 牧島 かれん
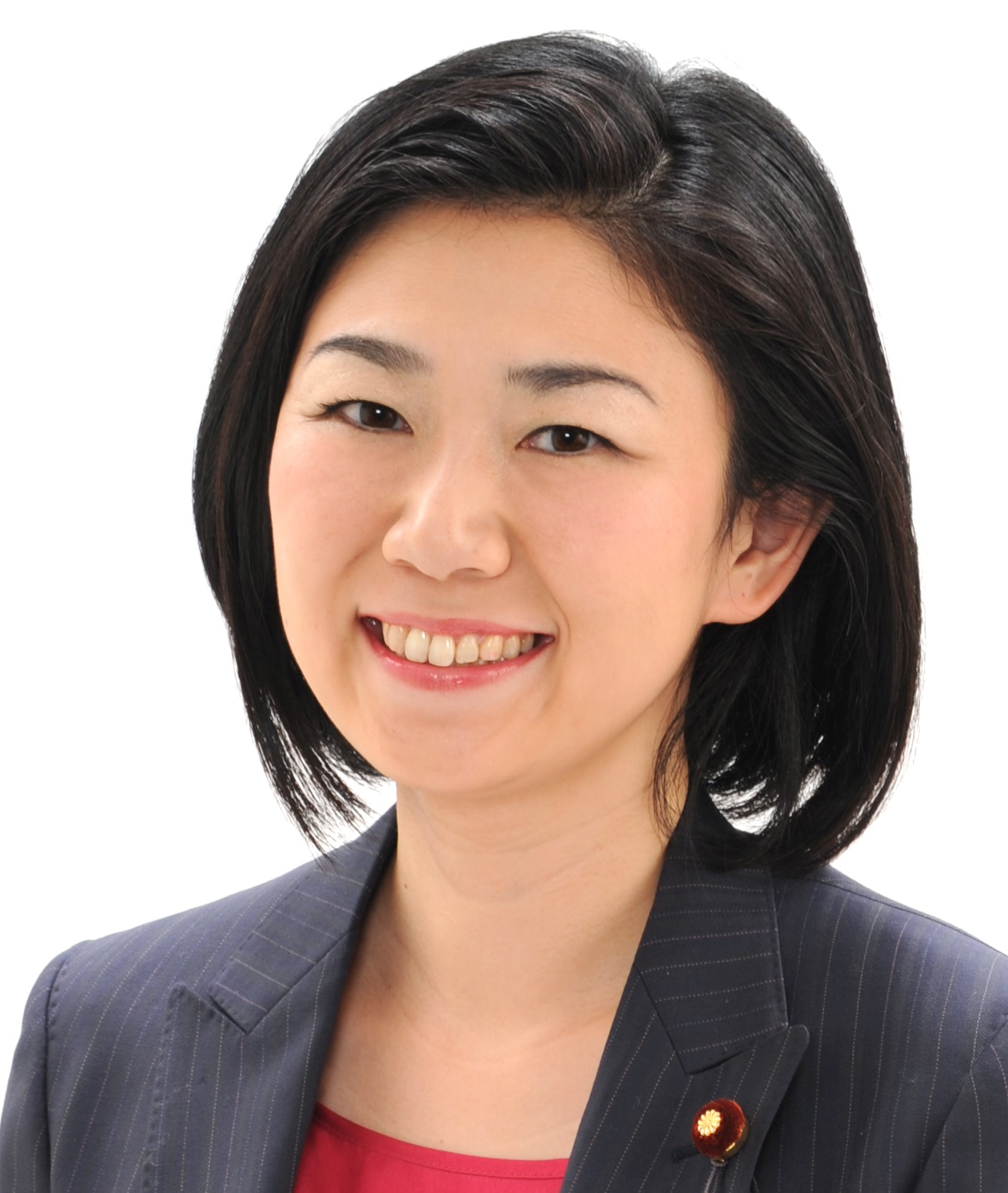
- Official portrait, 2013

Minister for Digital Transformation
- In office 4 October 2021 – 10 August 2022
- Prime Minister: Fumio Kishida
- Preceded by: Takuya Hirai
- Succeeded by: Taro Kono

Minister for Administrative Reform and Regulatory Reform
- In office 4 October 2021 – 10 August 2022
- Prime Minister: Fumio Kishida
- Preceded by: Taro Kono
- Succeeded by: Naoki Okada

Member of the House of Representatives for Kanagawa's 17th district
- Incumbent
- Assumed office 16 December 2012
- Preceded by: Yōsuke Kamiyama

Personal details
- Born: 1 November 1976 (age 49) Kanagawa, Japan
- Party: Liberal Democratic (Shikōkai)
- Education: International Christian University; George Washington University
- Occupation: University professor

Karen Makishima (牧島かれん, Makishima Karen; born 1 November 1976) is a Japanese politician. A member of the Liberal Democratic Party, she has been a member of the House of Representatives from the Kanagawa 17th district since 2012.

== Early life and education ==
Makishima was born in Yokosuka, Kanagawa. Her father was an assistant to representative Junichiro Koizumi and stood as a proportional representation candidate in the 1998 House of Councillors election. She received her bachelor's and doctorate from International Christian University and master's from George Washington University.

== Political career ==
Makishima ran for the Kanagawa 17th district seat in the 2009 election, but lost to DPJ candidate Yosuke Kamiyama. She defeated Kamiyama to win the seat in the 2012 election.

She served as Minister of Digital Affairs, Minister for Digital Reform, Minister in charge of Administrative Reforms, Minister in charge of Civil Service Reform and Minister of State for Regulatory Reform in the First Kishida Cabinet.

Makishima is the only female candidate from Japan's ruling Liberal Democratic Party (LDP) running in her prefecture for the 2024 general election. Her candidacy highlights the challenges women face in Japan’s male-dominated political landscape, where female representation in parliament remains low despite efforts to reduce the gender gap.
