= Akira Shichijo =

Japanese politician

- 七条 明
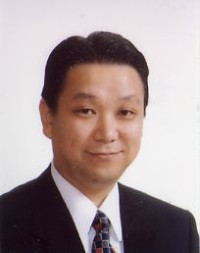

Mayor of Kamiita
- In office 20 October 2013 – 1 October 2017
- Preceded by: Nobuharu Nōda
- Succeeded by: Takuo Matsuda

Member of the House of Representatives
- In office 7 April 2000 – 21 July 2009
- Preceded by: Ihei Ochi
- Succeeded by: Multi-member district
- Constituency: Shikoku PR
- In office 19 July 1993 – 27 September 1996
- Preceded by: Hironori Inoue
- Succeeded by: Constituency abolished
- Constituency: Tokushima at-large

Member of the Tokushima Prefectural Assembly
- In office 1981–1993

Personal details
- Born: 1 August 1951 (age 75) Kamiita, Tokushima, Japan
- Party: Liberal Democratic
- Education: Tokyo University of Agriculture

Akira Shichijō (七条 明, Shichijō Akira; born 1 August 1951) is a Japanese politician of the Liberal Democratic Party, a member of the House of Representatives in the Diet (national legislature). A native of Kamiita, Tokushima and graduate of Tokyo University of Agriculture, he had served in the assembly of Tokushima Prefecture for four terms since 1981. He was elected to the House of Representatives for the first time in 1993. He also served as mayor of Kamiita, Tokushima, from 2013 to 2017.

House of Representatives (Japan)
Preceded by Nobuteru Ishihara	Chair, Committee on Judicial Affairs of the House of Representatives; 2006–2007	Succeeded by Hakubun Shimomura
Political offices
Preceded by Kazunori Tanaka, Hiroshi Moriyama	Parliamentary Secretary of Finance; 2003–2004; Served alongside: Hidetoshi Yamashita	Succeeded by Masatoshi Kurata, Yukio Danmoto
Preceded by Tatsuya Itō, Tatsuo Satō, Mahito Nakajima	State Minister of Cabinet Office; 2004–2005; Served alongside: Kōya Nishikawa, Takeshi Hayashida	Succeeded by Chiken Kakazu, Yoshitaka Sakurada, Taimei Yamaguchi
Preceded by Nobuharu Nōda	Mayor of Kamiita; 2013–2017	Succeeded by Takuo Matsuda
