= Shikoku proportional representation block =

Japanese House of Representatives constituency

Shikoku Proportional Representation Block
- Parliamentary constituency for the Japanese House of Representatives
- Map of House of Representatives proportional blocks, with the Shikoku block highlighted
- Prefectures: Ehime, Kagawa, Kōchi, and Tokushima
- Electorate: 3,028,194 (2026)

Current constituency
- Representatives: 6

The Shikoku proportional representation block (Hirei [daihyō] Shikoku burokku (比例[代表]四国ブロック)) is one of eleven proportional representation (PR) "blocks", multi-member constituencies for the House of Representatives in the Diet of Japan. It consists of Shikoku region covering Tokushima, Kagawa, Ehime and Kōchi Prefectures. Following the introduction of proportional voting it elected seven representatives in the 1996 general election. When the total number of PR seats was reduced from 200 to 180, the Shikoku PR block shrank to six seats.

== Results timeline ==
=== Vote share ===
Party	1996	2000	2003	2005	2009	2012	2014	2017	2021	2024	2026
LDP	41.61	35.97	38.23	38.29	31.98	30.66	34.85	35.92	39.14	31.01	42.04
NFP	24.18										
DPJ (Note: 1996 DP)	13.03	20.66	31.74	33.17	43.23	16.05	20.82				
JCP	12.06	10.97	8.04	8.20	6.67	5.78	10.12	7.37	6.36	5.70	4.15
SDP	7.06	10.08	5.30	5.55	4.20	2.31	2.12	1.85	1.78	1.57	1.14
Komeito		13.70	16.69	14.80	13.03	14.97	15.78	14.69	13.74	12.72	
LP		8.35									
Ishin (Note: 2012 JRP, 2014 JIP)						21.32	12.79	4.87	10.23	6.67	7.37
Your						5.03					
TPJ						3.45					
KnT								20.10			
CDP								14.45	17.18	18.17	
DPFP									7.19	15.09	12.99
Reiwa									3.12	6.20	3.00
Sanseitō										2.85	8.40
CRA											18.23
CPJ											2.69
Others	2.07 (Note: NSP 2.07)	0.27			0.87 (Note: HRP 0.87)	0.44 (Note: HRP 0.44)	3.52 (Note: Generations 2.84, HRP 0.69)	0.77 (Note: HRP 0.77)	1.25 (Note: NHK 1.25)		
Turnout		61.87	57.64	66.11	69.96	57.99	49.70	50.70	55.48	51.98	55.58

=== Seat distribution ===
Election	Distribution	Seats
1996		7
2000		6
2003		6
2005		6
2009		6
2012		6
2014		6
2017		6
2021		6
2024		6
2026		6

== List of representatives ==
Years	Elected representatives						
1996	Naoaki Haruna	Masanori Gotō	Kazuyoshi Endō	Shōzō Nishimura	Ihei Ochi died 2000, replaced by Akira Shichijō	Mamoru Nishida	Hajime Morita
2000	Naoaki Haruna	Masanori Gotō	Kazuyoshi Endō	Mamoru Nishida	Hajime Morita	Akira Shichijō	–
2003	Miho Takai	Masanori Gotō	Noritoshi Ishida	Hajime Morita	Yoshirō Okamoto	Akira Shichijō	–
2005	Junya Ogawa	Masanori Gotō resigned 2005, replaced by Miho Takai	Noritoshi Ishida	Akira Shichijō	Yoshirō Okamoto	Katsuko Nishimoto	–
2009	Hirobumi Niki	Takako Nagae	Hideyuki Takahashi	Noritoshi Ishida	Takuya Hirai	Shun'ichi Yamaguchi	–
2012	Junya Ogawa	Fumiki Sakurauchi	Arata Nishioka	Noritoshi Ishida	Takakazu Seto	Yasuji Izuhara	–
2014	Junya Ogawa	Hiroyuki Yokoyama	Noritoshi Ishida	Teru Fukui	Takakazu Seto	Mamoru Fukuyama	–

== Election results ==
=== 2026 ===
2026 results in the Shikoku PR block
Party	Votes	Swing	%	Seats	+/–
Liberal Democratic Party (LDP)	691,402	42.04	▲11.03	4	▲1
Centrist Reform Alliance (CRA) (Note: Swings compared to CDP and Komeito)	299,777	18.23	▼12.66	1	▼1
Democratic Party For the People (DPFP)	213,661	12.99	▼2.10	1	0
Sanseitō	138,187	8.40	▲5.55	0	0
Japan Innovation Party (Ishin)	121,217	7.37	▲0.70	0	0
Japanese Communist Party (JCP)	68,324	4.15	▼1.55	0	0
Reiwa Shinsengumi (Reiwa)	49,267	3.00	▼3.20	0	0
Conservative Party of Japan (CPJ)	44,284	2.69	New	0	New
Social Democratic Party (SDP)	18,674	1.14	▼0.43	0	0
Total	1,644,793	100.00		6	
Invalid votes	38,292	2.28			
Turnout	1,683,085	55.58	▲3.60		
Registered voters	3,028,194				

=== 2024 ===
2024 results in the Shikoku PR block
Party	Votes	Swing	%	Seats	+/–
Liberal Democratic Party (LDP)	479,835	31.01	▼8.13	3	0
Constitutional Democratic Party of Japan (CDP)	281,209	18.17	▲0.99	1	0
Democratic Party For the People (DPFP)	233,515	15.09	▲7.90	1	▲1
Komeito	196,765	12.72	▼1.02	1	0
Japan Innovation Party (Ishin)	103,237	6.67	▼3.56	0	▼1
Reiwa Shinsengumi (Reiwa)	95,973	6.20	▲3.09	0	0
Japanese Communist Party (JCP)	88,224	5.70	▼0.66	0	0
Sanseitō	44,127	2.85	New	0	New
Social Democratic Party (SDP)	24,361	1.57	▲0.21	0	0
Total	1,547,246	100.00		6	
Invalid votes	50,347	3.15			
Turnout	1,597,593	51.98	▼3.50		
Registered voters	3,073,592				

=== 2021 ===
2021 results in the Shikoku PR block
Party	Votes	Swing	%	Seats	+/–
Liberal Democratic Party (LDP)	664,805	39.14	▲3.22	3	0
Constitutional Democratic Party of Japan (CDP)	291,871	17.18	▲2.74	1	0
Komeito	233,407	13.74	▼0.95	1	0
Japan Innovation Party (Ishin)	173,826	10.23	▲5.37	1	▲1
Democratic Party For the People (DPFP)	122,082	7.19	New	0	New
Japanese Communist Party (JCP)	108,021	6.36	▼1.01	0	0
Reiwa Shinsengumi (Reiwa)	52,941	3.12	New	0	New
Social Democratic Party (SDP)	30,249	1.78	▼0.07	0	0
NHK Party	21,285	1.25	New	0	New
Total	1,698,487	100.00		6	
Invalid votes	62,480	3.55			
Turnout	1,760,967	55.48	▲4.78		
Registered voters	3,174,258				

=== 2017 ===
2017 results in the Shikoku PR block
Party	Votes	Swing	%	Seats	+/–
Liberal Democratic Party (LDP)	579,225	35.92	▲1.07	3	0
Kibō no Tō	324,106	20.10	New	1	New
Komeito	236,863	14.69	▼1.09	1	0
Constitutional Democratic Party of Japan (CDP)	232,965	14.45	New	1	New
Japanese Communist Party (JCP)	118,826	7.37	▼2.75	0	0
Japan Innovation Party (Ishin)	78,500	4.87	New	0	New
Social Democratic Party (SDP)	29,818	1.85	▼0.27	0	0
Happiness Realization Party (HRP)	12,356	0.77	▲0.08	0	0
Total	1,612,659	100.00		6	
Invalid votes	46,262	2.79			
Turnout	1,658,921	50.70	▲1.00		
Registered voters	3,272,184				

=== 2014 ===
2014 results in the Shikoku PR block
Party	Votes	Swing	%	Seats	+/–
Liberal Democratic Party (LDP)	547,185	34.85	▲4.20	3	▲1
Democratic Party of Japan (DPJ)	326,803	20.82	▲4.77	1	0
Komeito	247,776	15.78	▲0.82	1	0
Japan Innovation Party (JIP)	200,882	12.79	▼8.52	1	▼1
Japanese Communist Party (JCP)	158,848	10.12	▲4.34	0	0
Party for Future Generations	44,515	2.84	New	0	New
Social Democratic Party (SDP)	33,257	2.12	▼0.19	0	0
Happiness Realization Party (HRP)	10,762	0.69	▲0.24	0	0
Total	1,570,028	100.00		6	
Invalid votes	49,834	3.08			
Turnout	1,619,862	49.70	▼8.29		
Registered voters	3,259,284				

=== 2012 ===
2012 results in the Shikoku PR block
Party	Votes	Swing	%	Seats	+/–
Liberal Democratic Party (LDP)	567,193	30.66	▼1.33	2	0
Japan Restoration Party (JRP)	394,393	21.32	New	2	New
Democratic Party of Japan (DPJ)	296,914	16.05	▼27.20	1	▼2
Komeito	276,907	14.97	▲1.94	1	0
Japanese Communist Party (JCP)	106,976	5.78	▼0.89	0	0
Your Party	93,090	5.03	New	0	New
Tomorrow Party of Japan (TPJ)	63,830	3.45	New	0	New
Social Democratic Party (SDP)	42,762	2.31	▼1.89	0	0
Happiness Realization Party (HRP)	8,171	0.44	▼0.43	0	0
Total	1,850,236	100.00		6	
Invalid votes	58,365	3.06			
Turnout	1,908,601	57.99	▼11.97		
Registered voters	3,291,313				

=== 2009 ===
2009 results in the Shikoku PR block
Party	Votes	Swing	%	Seats	+/–
Democratic Party of Japan (DPJ)	973,038	43.24	▲10.08	3	▲1
Liberal Democratic Party (LDP)	719,594	31.98	▼6.31	2	▼1
Komeito	293,204	13.03	▼1.77	1	0
Japanese Communist Party (JCP)	150,171	6.67	▼1.53	0	0
Social Democratic Party (SDP)	94,558	4.20	▼1.35	0	0
Happiness Realization Party (HRP)	19,507	0.87	New	0	New
Total	2,250,072	100.00		6	
Invalid votes	83,071	3.56			
Turnout	2,333,143	69.96	▲3.85		
Registered voters	3,334,875				

=== 2005 ===
2005 results in the Shikoku PR block
Party	Votes	Swing	%	Seats	+/–
Liberal Democratic Party (LDP)	821,746	38.29	▲0.06	3	0
Democratic Party of Japan (DPJ)	711,927	33.17	▲1.43	2	0
Komeito	317,575	14.80	▼1.90	1	0
Japanese Communist Party (JCP)	175,994	8.20	▲0.16	0	0
Social Democratic Party (SDP)	119,089	5.55	▲0.24	0	0
Total	2,146,331	100.00		6	
Invalid votes	85,434	3.83			
Turnout	2,231,765	66.11	▲8.48		
Registered voters	3,375,693				

=== 2003 ===
2003 results in the Shikoku PR block
Party	Votes	Swing	%	Seats	+/–
Liberal Democratic Party (LDP)	708,051	38.23	▲2.26	3	0
Democratic Party of Japan (DPJ)	587,828	31.74	▲11.08	2	▲1
Komeito	309,160	16.69	▲3.00	1	0
Japanese Communist Party (JCP)	148,953	8.04	▼2.93	0	▼1
Social Democratic Party (SDP)	98,243	5.30	▼4.77	0	0
Total	1,852,235	100.00		6	
Invalid votes	92,906	4.78			
Turnout	1,945,141	57.64	▼4.24		
Registered voters	3,374,840				

=== 2000 ===
2000 results in the Shikoku PR block
Party	Votes	Swing	%	Seats	+/–
Liberal Democratic Party (LDP)	700,719	35.97	▼5.64	3	0
Democratic Party of Japan (DPJ)	402,457	20.66	▲7.63	1	0
Komeito	266,791	13.70	New	1	New
Japanese Communist Party (JCP)	213,729	10.97	▼1.08	1	0
Social Democratic Party (SDP)	196,277	10.08	▲3.02	0	0
Liberal Party (LP)	162,700	8.35	New	0	New
Liberal League (LL)	5,316	0.27	New	0	New
Total	1,947,989	100.00		6	▼1
Invalid votes	128,824	6.20			
Turnout	2,076,813	61.87			
Registered voters	3,356,478				

=== 1996 ===
1996 results in the Shikoku PR block
Party	Votes	%	Seats
Liberal Democratic Party (LDP)	783,589	41.61	3
New Frontier Party (NFP)	455,269	24.18	2
Democratic Party (DP)	245,323	13.03	1
Japanese Communist Party (JCP)	227,014	12.06	1
Social Democratic Party (SDP)	132,868	7.06	0
New Socialist Party (NSP)	39,067	2.07	0
Total	1,883,130	100.00	7
